= Tiancunlu Subdistrict =

Tiancunlu Subdistrict 田村路街道
- Subdistrict
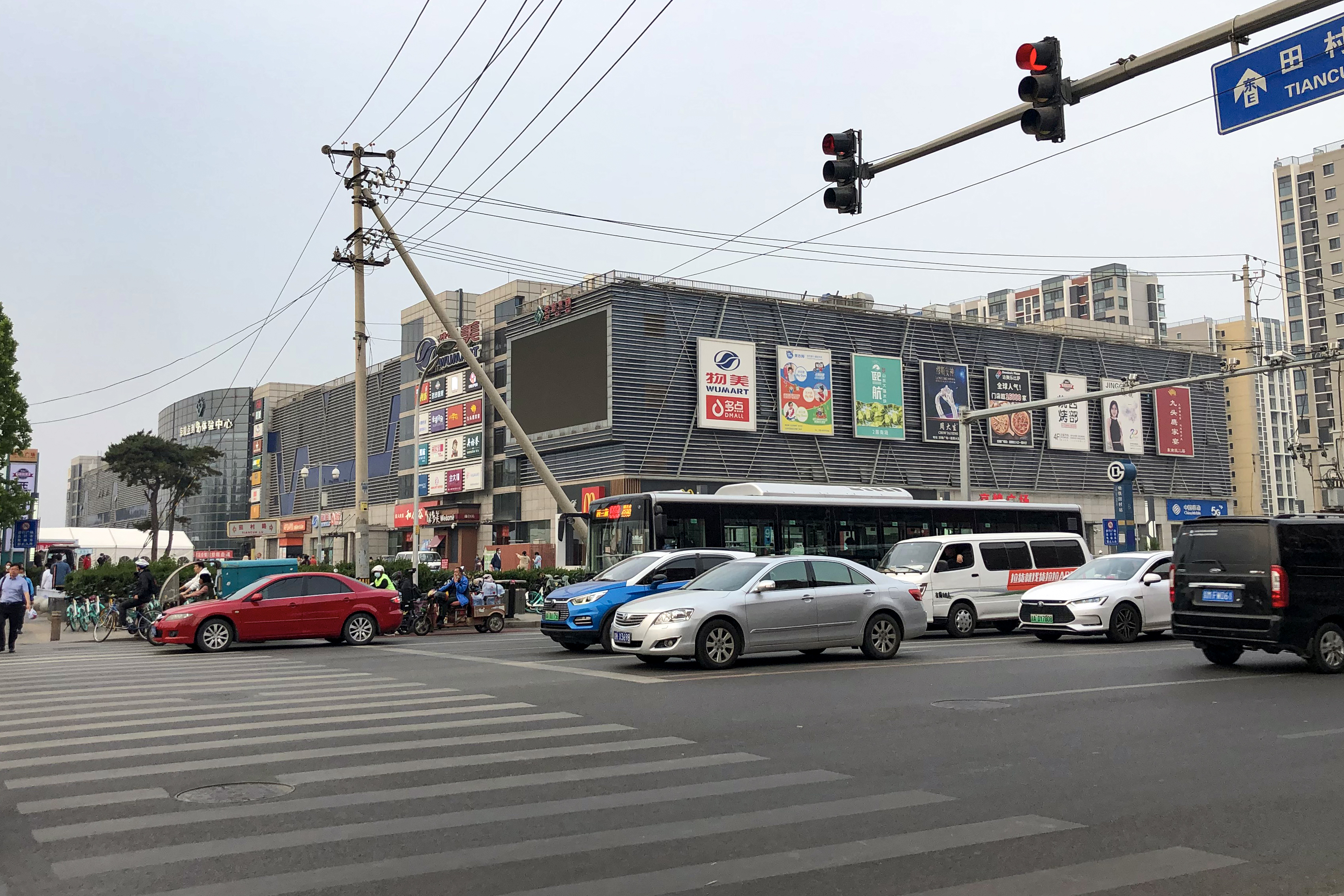
- Jingliang Plaza within the subdistrict, 2021

- Location within Beijing Location within China
- Coordinates: 39°55′42″N 116°15′25″E
- Country: China
- Municipality: Beijing
- District: Haidian
- Village-level Divisions: 27 communities

Area
  - Total: 7.58 km^{2} (2.93 sq mi)

Population (2020)
  - Total: 108,088
  - Density: 14,300/km^{2} (36,900/sq mi)
- Time zone: UTC+8 (China Standard)
- Postal code: 100143
- Area code: 010

Tiancunlu Subdistrict (Chinese: 田村路街道; pinyin: Tiáncūnlù Jiēdào) is a subdistrict on the southwest of Haidian District, Beijing, China. It borders Sijiqing Town in the north, Shuguang and Balizhuang Subdistricts in the east, Yongdinglu Subdistrict, Wanshoulu Subdistrict and Laoshan Subdistrict in the south, and Bajiao Subdistrict in the west. As of 2020 it had a population of 108,088.

The subdistrict was established in 2000, and was named for the Tiancun (Chinese: 田村; lit. 'Farmland Village') Road that passed through it.

== Administrative Divisions ==
In the year 2021, Tiancunlu Subdistrict covered a total of 27 communities:

Administrative division code	Subdivision names	Name transliteration
110108021001	西木	Ximu
110108021002	东营房	Dongyingfang
110108021003	半壁店第一	Banbidian Diyi
110108021004	半壁店第二	Banbidian Di'er
110108021005	永达	Yongda
110108021011	阜石路第一	Fushilu Diyi
110108021014	阜石路第四	Fushilu Disi
110108021015	永景园	Yongjingyuan
110108021016	玉海园一里	Yuhaiyuan Yili
110108021018	玉海园二里	Yuhaiyuan Erli
110108021020	玉海园三里	Yuhaiyuan Sanli
110108021022	玉海园五里	Yuhaiyuan Wuli
110108021023	王致和	Wangzhihe
110108021024	田村	Tiancun
110108021025	山南	Shannan
110108021028	建西苑	Jianxiyuan
110108021029	玉阜嘉园	Yufu Jiayuan
110108021030	乐府家园	Yuefu Jiayuan
110108021031	幸福	Xingfu
110108021033	兰德华庭	Lande Huating
110108021034	景宜里	Jingyili
110108021035	瑞和园	Ruiheyuan
110108021036	武颐嘉园	Wuyi Jiayuan
110108021037	玉泉北里	Yuquan Beili
110108021038	金玉府北里	Jinwangfu Beili
110108021039	金玉府南里	Jinwangfu Nanli
110108021040	玉泉嘉园	Yuquan Jiayuan

== See also ==
- List of township-level divisions of Beijing
