= Pagoda of Cishou Temple =

Pagoda in Balizhuang, China

Coordinates: 39°55′37″N 116°17′22″E

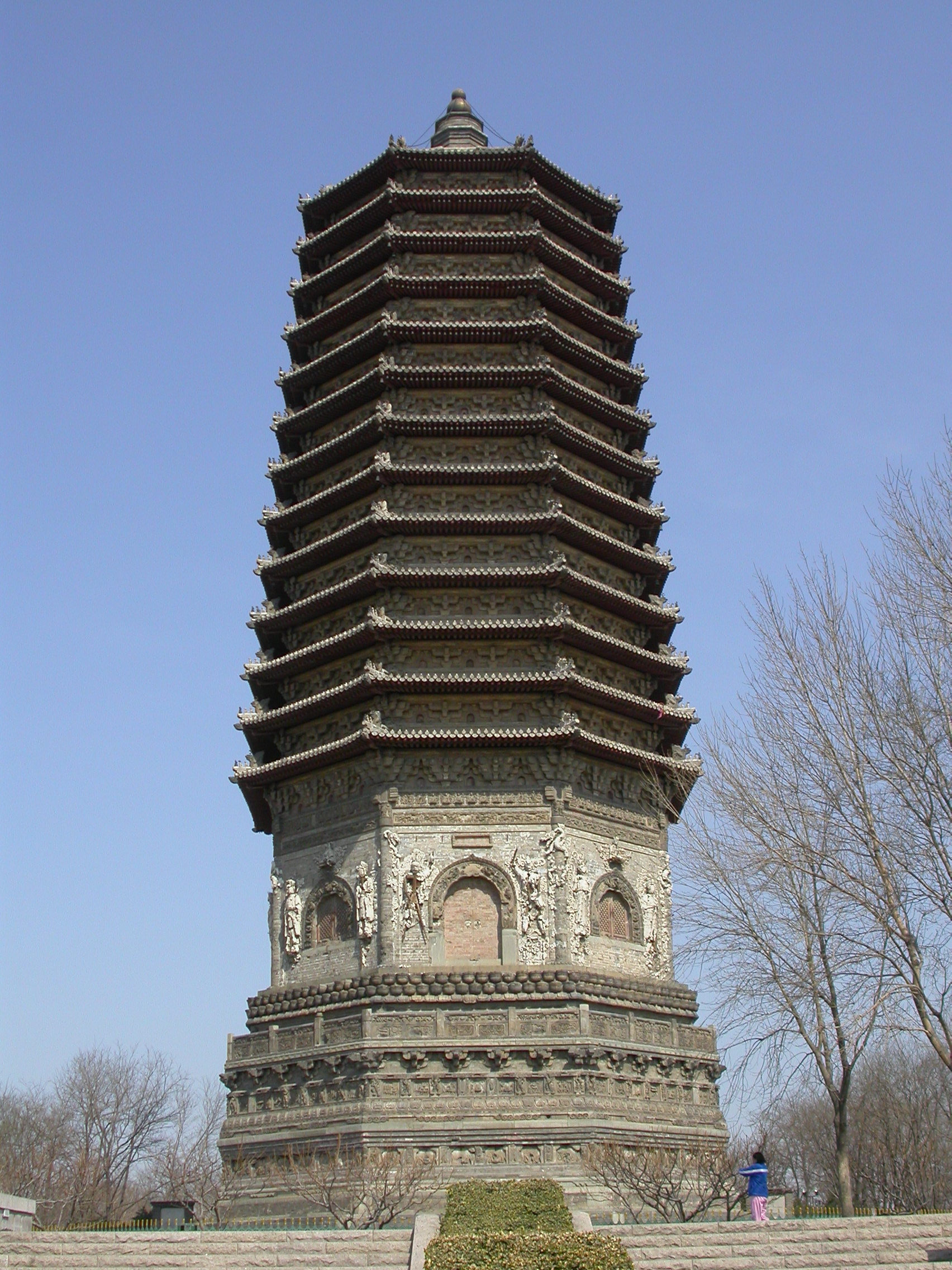
The Pagoda of Cishou Temple

The Pagoda of Cishou Temple (simplified Chinese: 慈寿寺塔; traditional Chinese: 慈壽寺塔; pinyin: Císhòu Sì Tǎ), originally known as Yong'an Wanshou Pagoda (永安万寿塔; 永安萬壽塔; Yǒng'ān Wànshòu Tǎ), is a 16th-century stone and brick Chinese pagoda located in the Buddhist Cishou Temple in Balizhuang, Haidian District, Beijing.

== Description ==
This octagonal-shaped pagoda is roughly 50 m (164 ft) tall, with elaborate ornamental carvings, thirteen tiers of eaves, and a small steeple. The Cishou Pagoda was built in 1576 during the Ming dynasty (1368–1644), commissioned by Empress Dowager Li during the reign of the Wanli Emperor (1572–1620). The Cishou Pagoda was modelled upon a similar pagoda at Tianning Temple outside Guang'anmen in Beijing. The style of eaves on the pagoda is similar to older Liao dynasty and Jin dynasty pagodas. Although the surrounding Cishou Temple has been destroyed, the original Ming pagoda of Cishou has remained unharmed except for noticeable weathering damage to the carved reliefs on its exterior facade.

The brick base of the pagoda is shaped as a sumeru pedestal and is decorated with relief carvings of the Buddha, lotus petals, and other designs. The upper portion of the pagoda features carved designs of Chinese musical instruments such as the guqin. Stylistic dougong supports—commonly found in wooden Chinese architecture—are carved in between the eaves of the pagoda.

== Transport ==
- Cishousi station, Line 6 and Line 10, Beijing Subway

== See also ==
- Chinese architecture
- Pagoda
