= Cishou Si station =

Beijing Subway interchange station

Cishou Si 慈寿寺
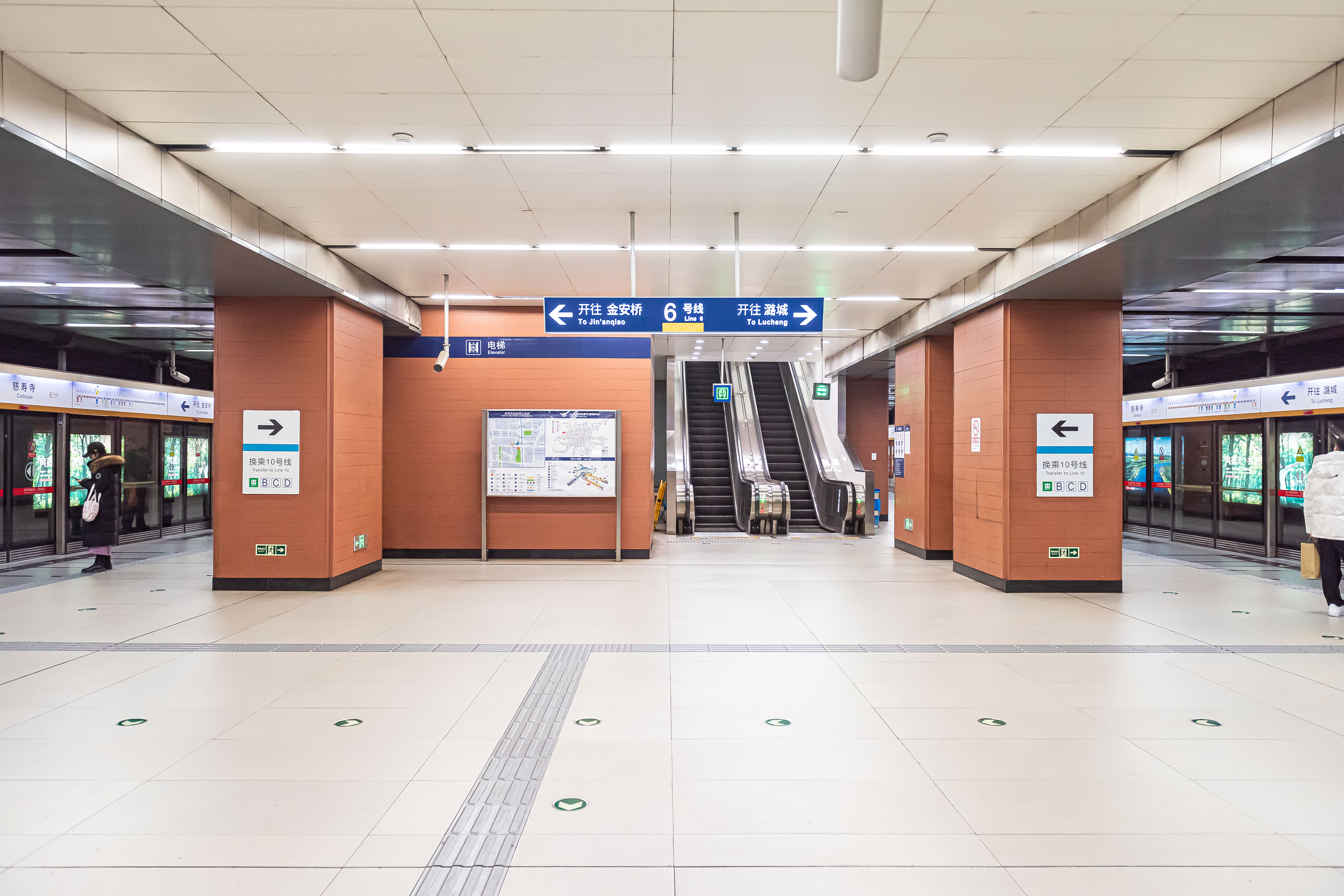
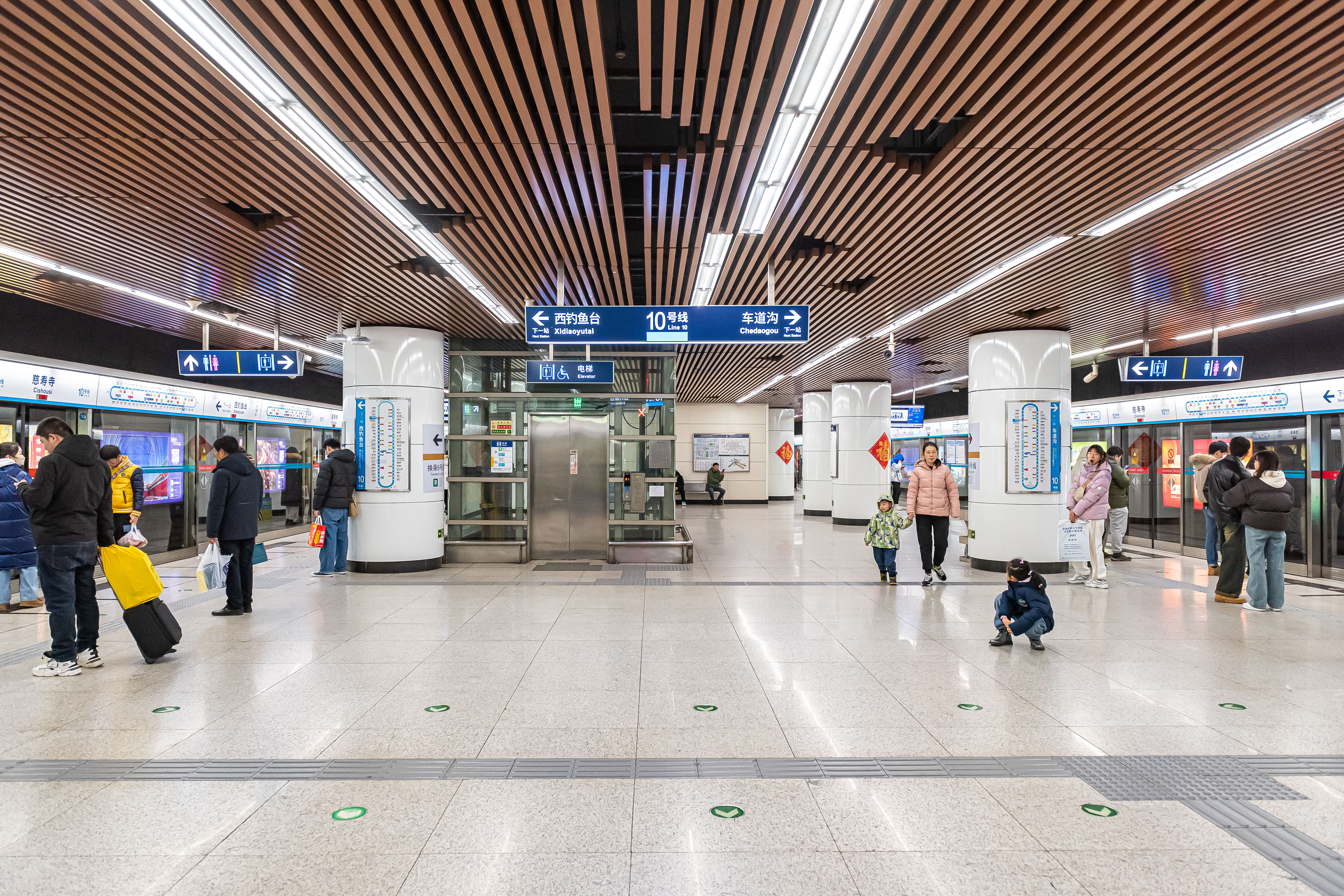
- Line 6 platform Line 10 platform

General information
- Location: Linglong Road (玲珑路) and Landianchang South Road (蓝靛厂南路); Balizhuang Subdistrict, Haidian District, Beijing; China
- Coordinates: 39.9333°N 116.2952°E
- Operator: Beijing Mass Transit Railway Operation Corporation Limited
- Lines: Line 6; Line 10
- Platforms: 4 (2 island platforms)
- Tracks: 4

Construction
- Structure type: Underground
- Accessible: Yes

History
- Opened: December 30, 2012; 13 years ago

Services
Preceding station	Beijing Subway	Following station
Haidian Wuluju towards Jin'anqiao	Line 6	Huayuan Qiao towards Luyang
Xidiaoyutai outer loop / anticlockwise	Line 10	Chedaogou inner loop / clockwise
Location
- Location within Beijing

Cishou Si station (simplified Chinese: 慈寿寺站; traditional Chinese: 慈壽寺站; pinyin: Císhòu Sì Zhàn; lit. 'Cishou Temple station') is an interchange station on Line 6 and Line 10 of the Beijing Subway. This station opened on December 30, 2012. It is named after the nearby Cishou Temple in Linglong Park.

== Station layout ==
Both the line 6 and 10 stations have underground island platforms.

== Exits ==
There are 5 exits in operation, lettered B, C1, C2, D, and I. Exits C2 and I are accessible. Two more exits, lettered A and H are under planning.

== Gallery ==
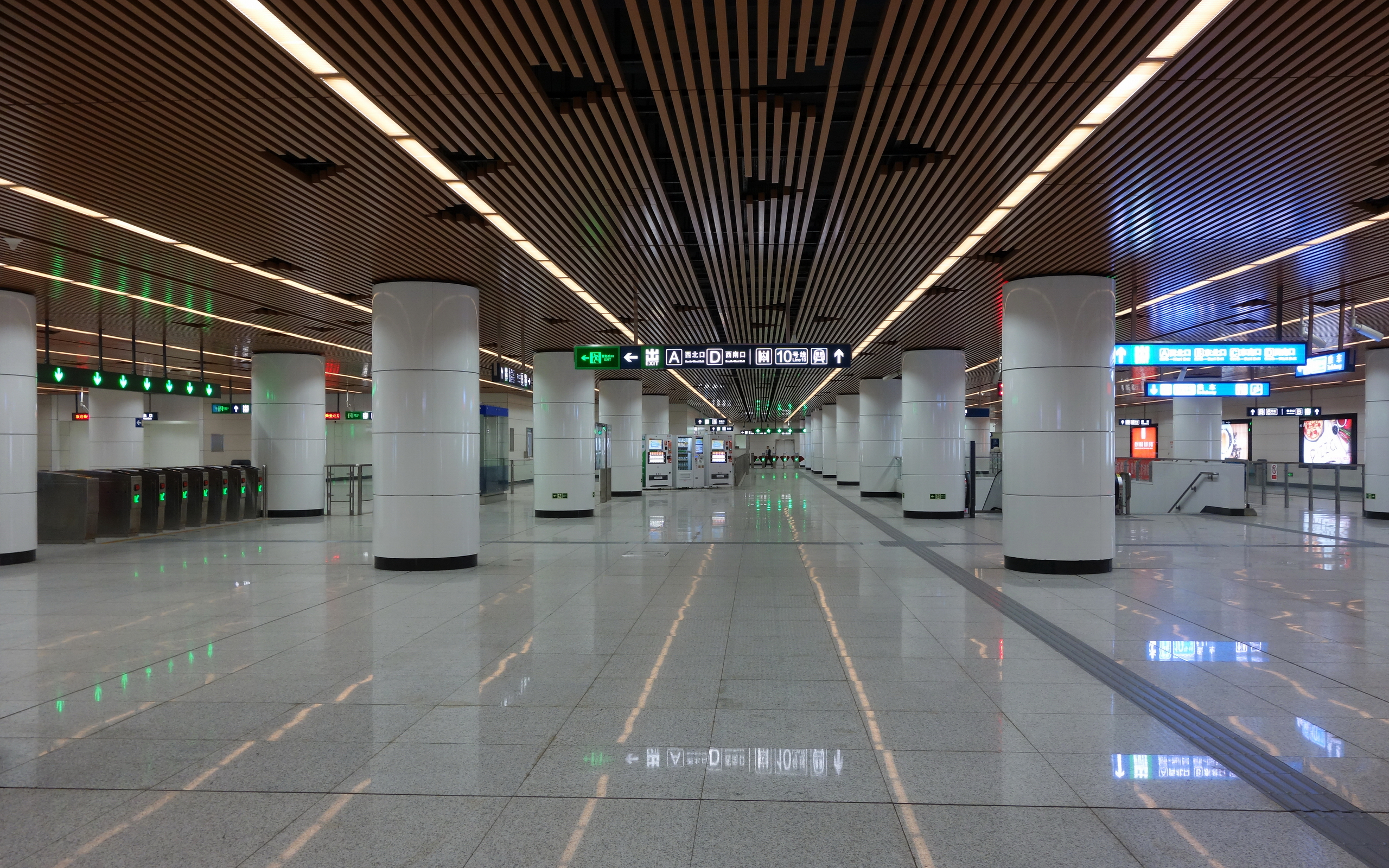
station hall of line 10

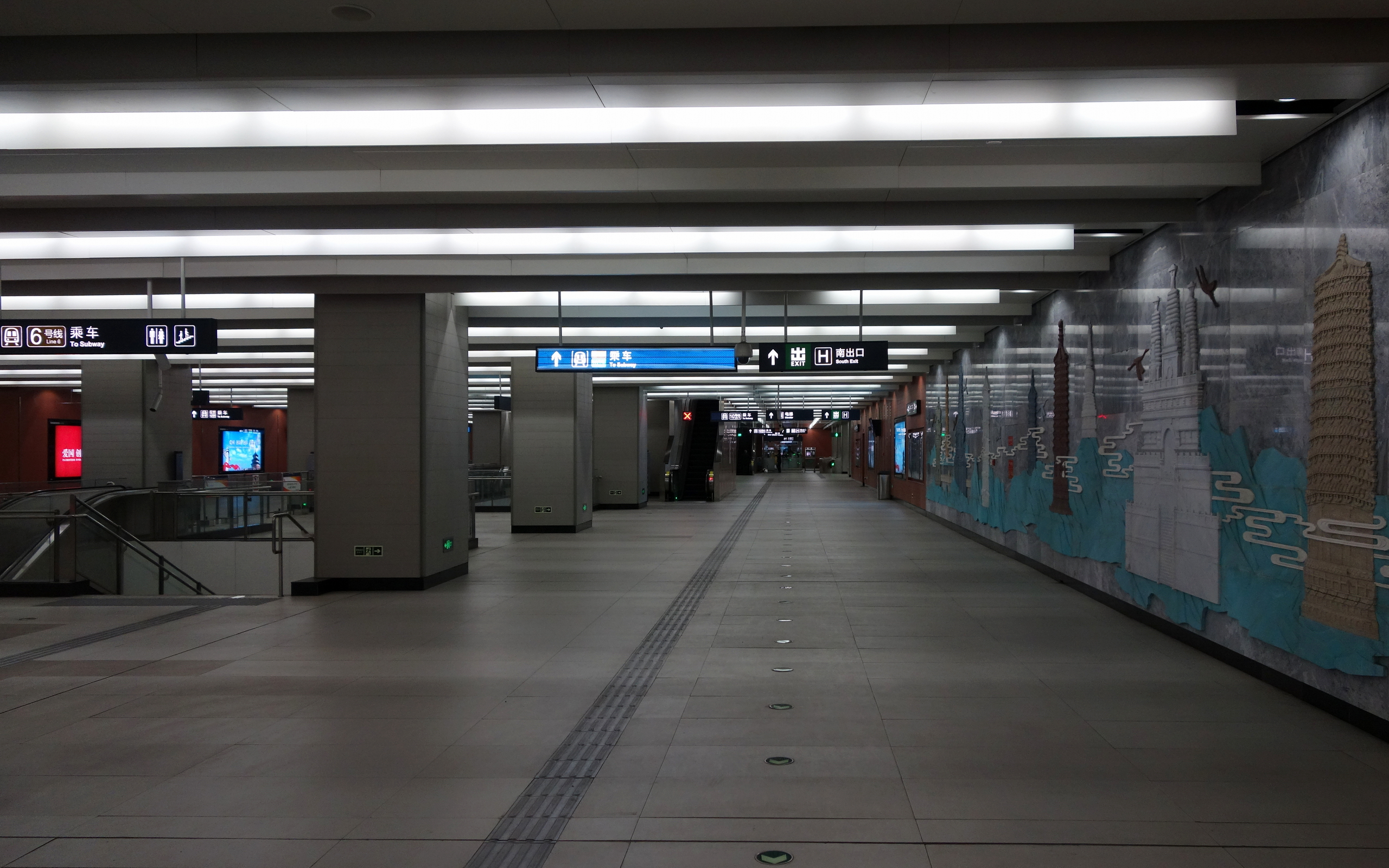
station hall of line 6

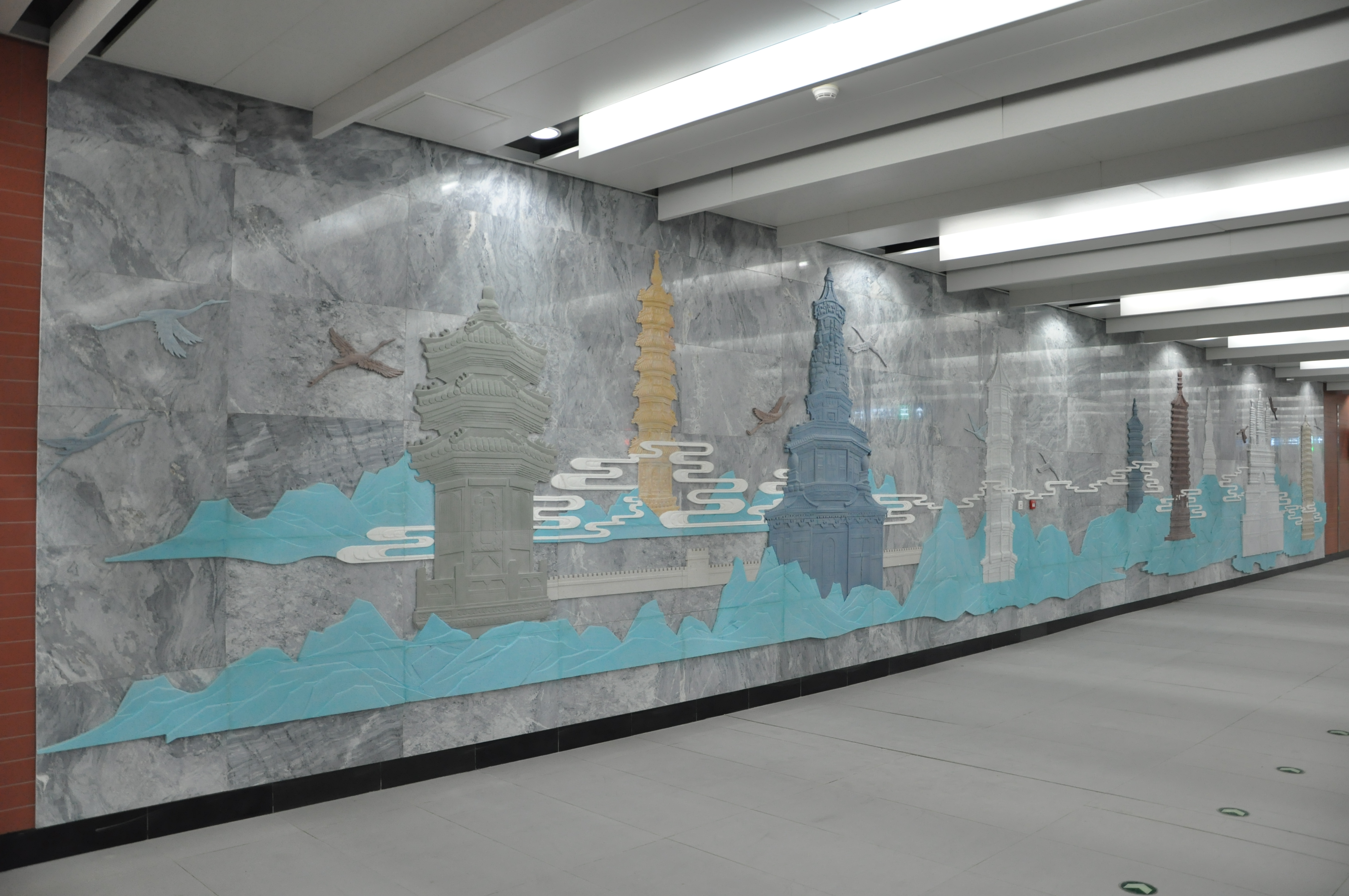
Fresco in station hall of line 6

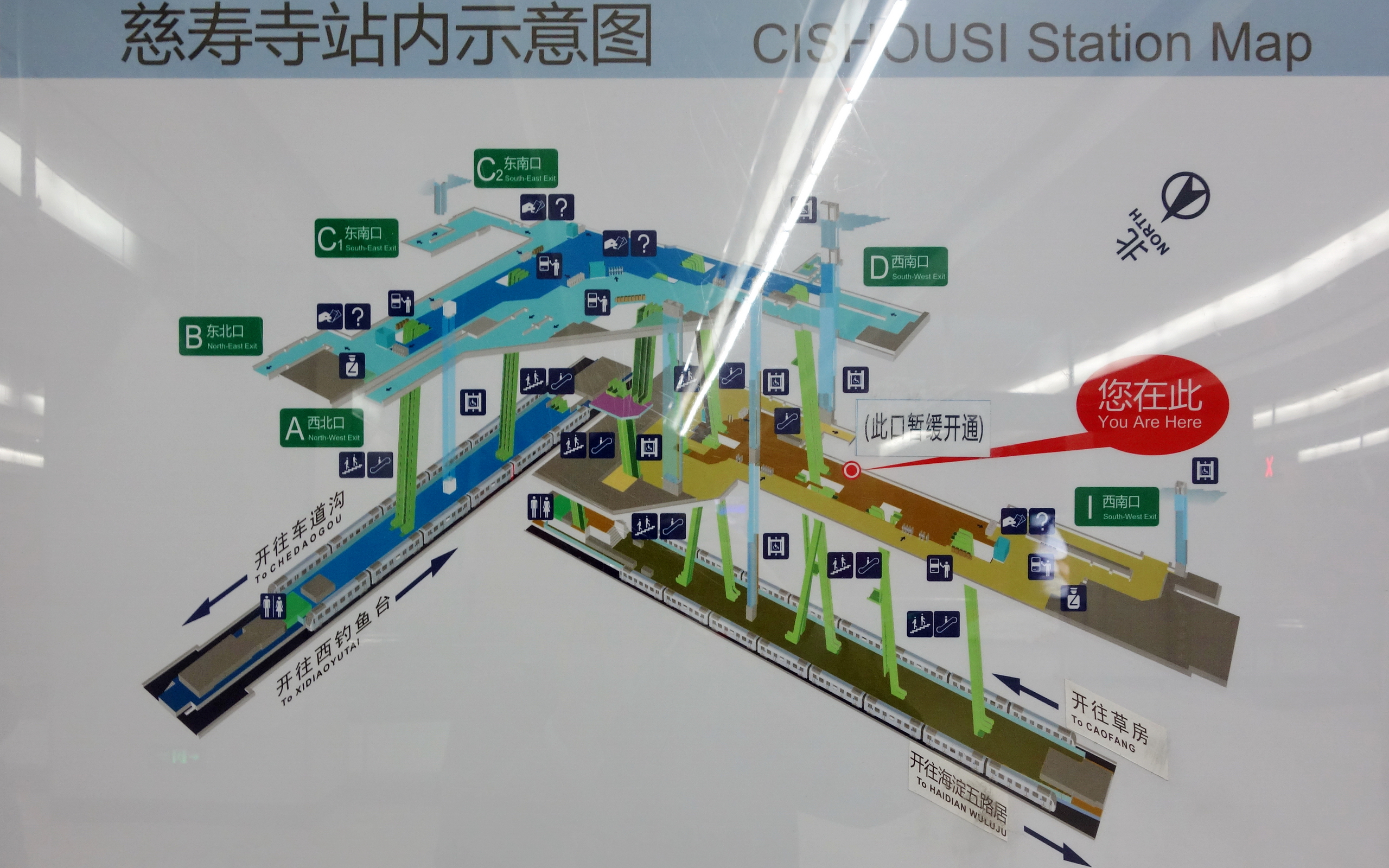
Station Layout
