= Balizhuang Subdistrict =

Balizhuang Subdistrict (八里庄街道) may refer to:

- Balizhuang Subdistrict, Chaoyang District, Beijing
- Balizhuang Subdistrict, Haidian District, Beijing
