= Tianning Temple (Beijing) =

Buddhist temple in Beijing, China

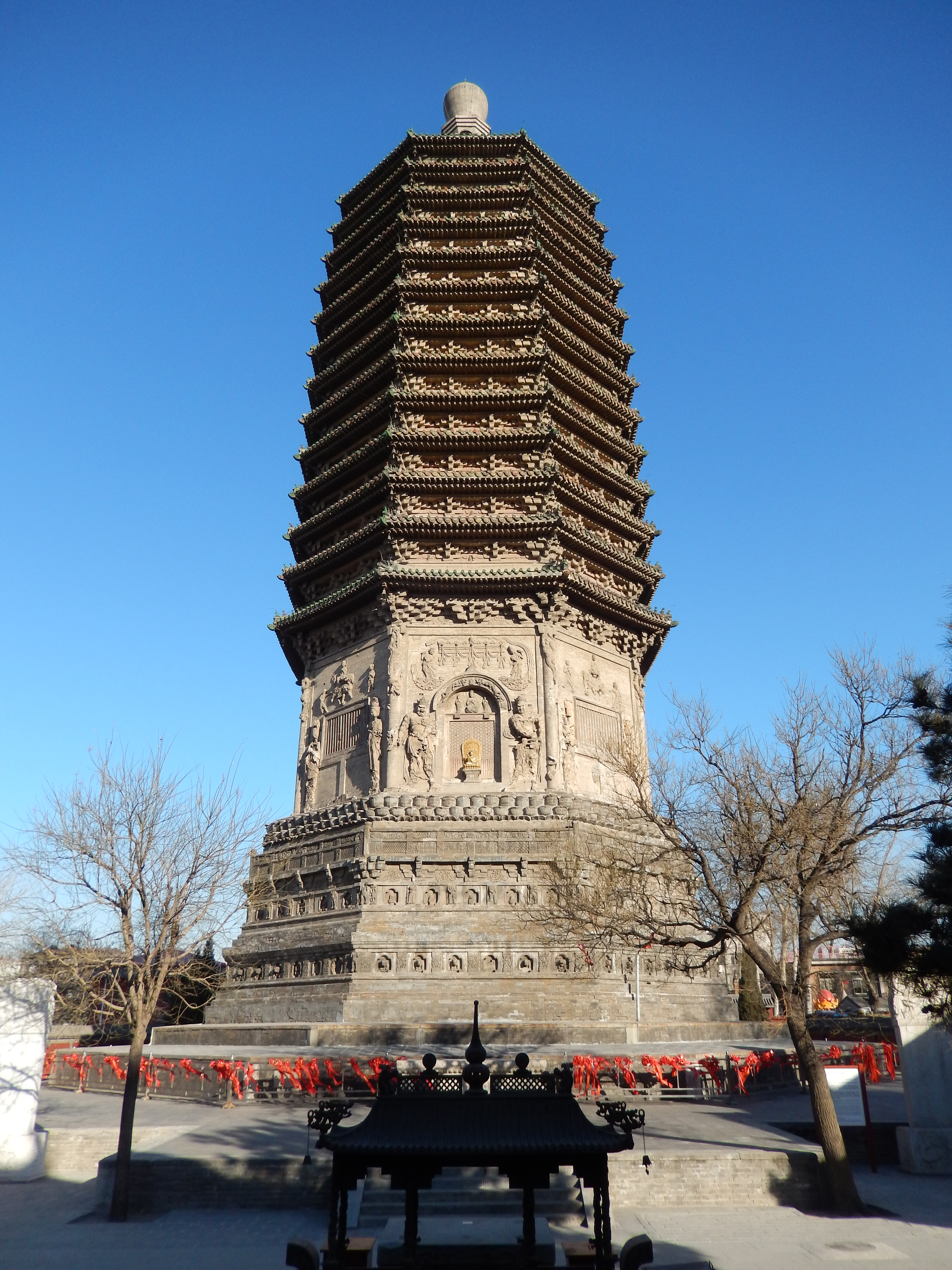
- Brick and stone pagoda of the Tianning Temple

Religion
- Affiliation: Buddhism

Location
- Location: Beijing
- Country: China
- Interactive map of Tianning Temple
- Coordinates: 39.8937°N 116.34°E

Architecture
- Completed: 1119-1120

The Tianning Temple (simplified Chinese: 天宁寺; traditional Chinese: 天寧寺; pinyin: Tiānníng Sì) is a Buddhist temple complex located in Xicheng District of Beijing, in northern China.

The temple contains the 12th-century Pagoda of Tianning Temple. The 8 sided pagoda is of the Liao dynasty, built from around 1100 to 1119 or 1120 CE, shortly before the Liao dynasty was conquered by the Jin dynasty.

== Architecture ==
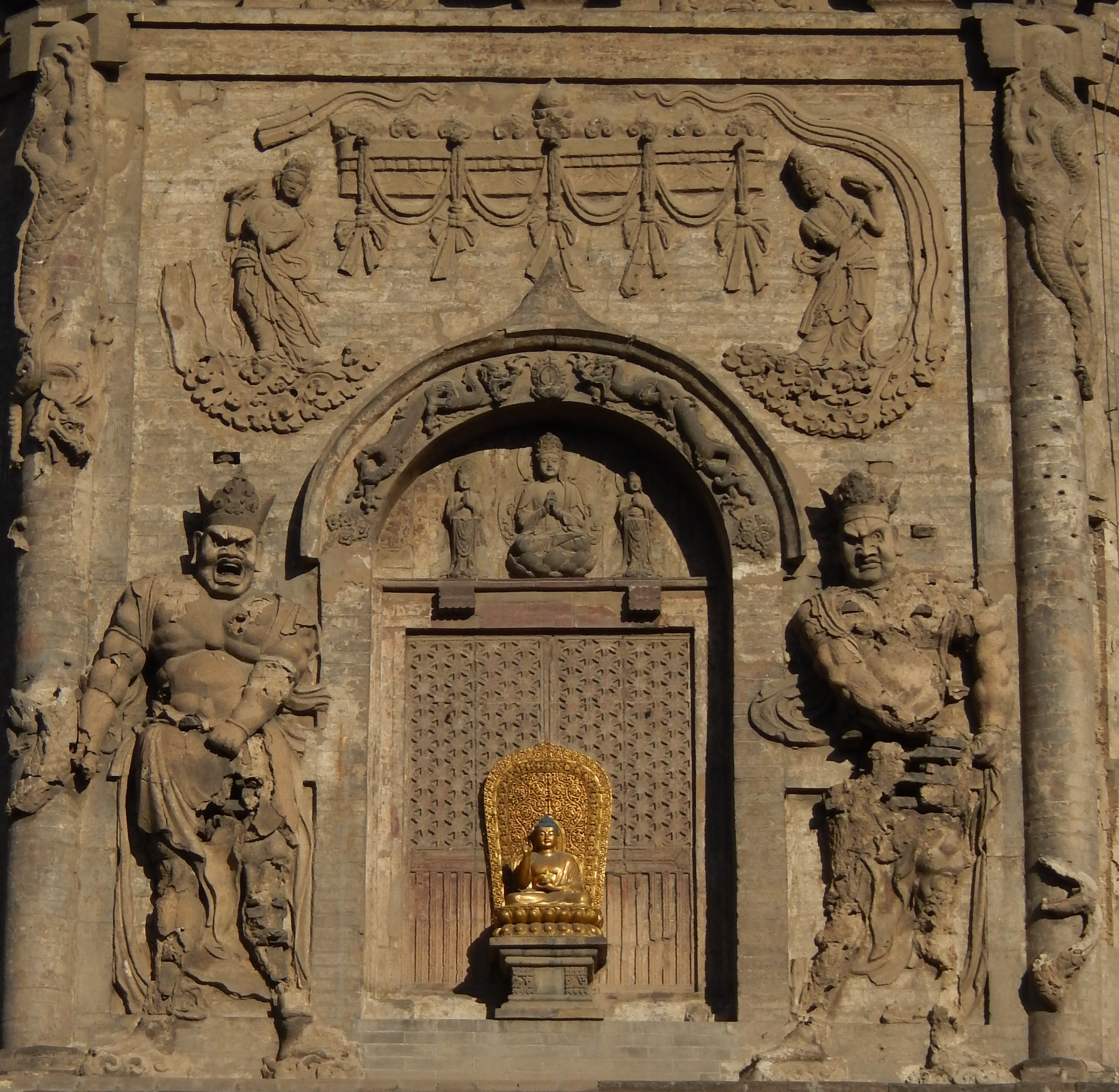
Relief sculpture on pagoda's southern facade.

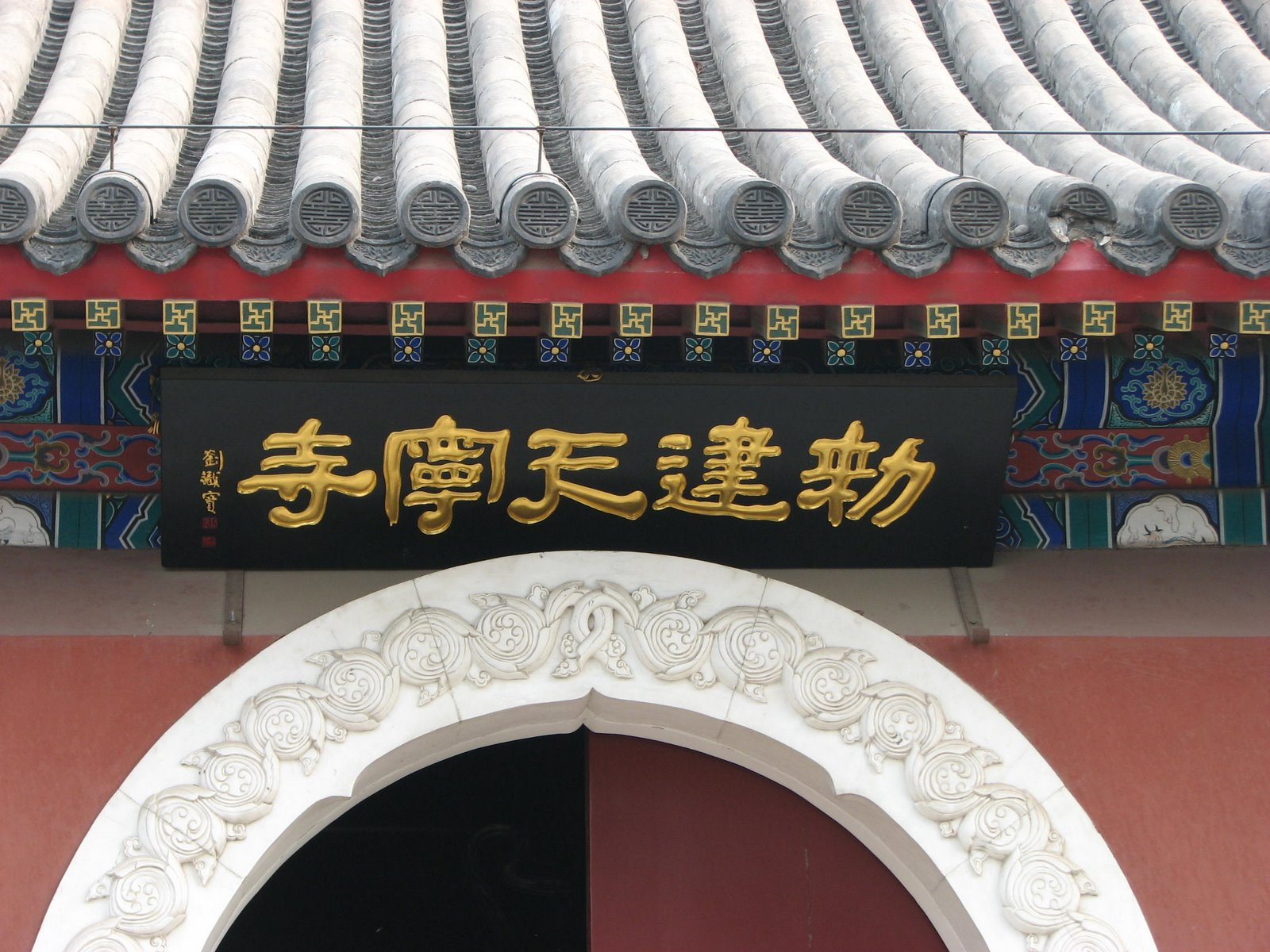
A sign−plaque over the temple's front gate.

This thirteen story, 57.8 m (189 ft) tall, octagonal-based Chinese pagoda is made of brick and stone, yet imitates the design of wooden-constructed pagodas from the era by featuring ornamental dougong (bracket supports). It rests on a large square platform, with the bottom portion of the pagoda taking on the shape of a sumeru pedestal.

The pagoda features a veranda with banisters, yet is entirely solid with no hollow inside or staircase as some pagodas feature. Other ornamental designs include arched doorways and heavenly Buddhist guardians. Its design inspired that of later pagodas, such as the similar Ming dynasty era Pagoda of Cishou Temple of Beijing built in 1576.

The structure and ornamentation have remained the same since the pagoda was built, but the 1976 Tangshan earthquake caused the original pearl-shaped steeple of the pagoda to break off and fall. It has since been restored. The temple grounds surrounding the pagoda have also been renovated and rebuilt several times over the course of the Ming and Qing dynasties. The architectural historian Liang Sicheng (1901–1972)—known for discovering and documenting the oldest existent wooden structures still standing in China—lauded the Pagoda of Tianning Temple as a pristine architectural design of antiquity.

== See also ==
- Buddhist temples in Beijing
- Liao dynasty architecture
- Song dynasty architecture
- History of Beijing
- List of tallest structures built before the 20th century
