= Yongdinglu Subdistrict =

Yongdinglu Subdistrict 永定路街道
- Subdistrict
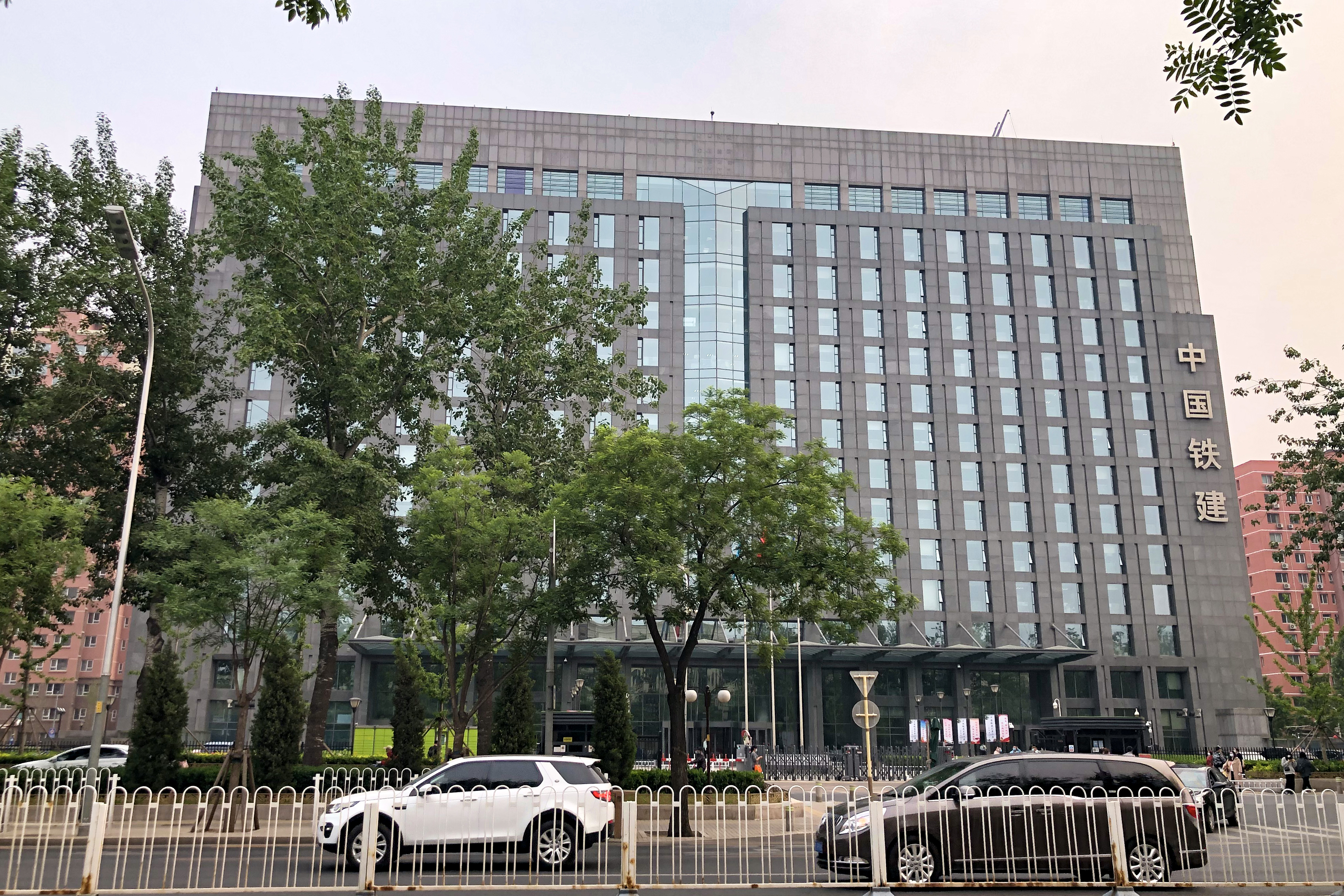
- China Railway Construction Corporation Headquarter within the subdistrict, 2021

- Location within Beijing Location within China
- Coordinates: 39°54′32″N 116°15′28″E
- Country: China
- Municipality: Beijing
- District: Haidian
- Village-level Divisions: 25 communities

Area
  - Total: 1.48 km^{2} (0.57 sq mi)

Population (2020)
  - Total: 90,879
  - Density: 61,400/km^{2} (159,000/sq mi)
- Time zone: UTC+8 (China Standard)
- Postal code: 100039
- Area code: 010

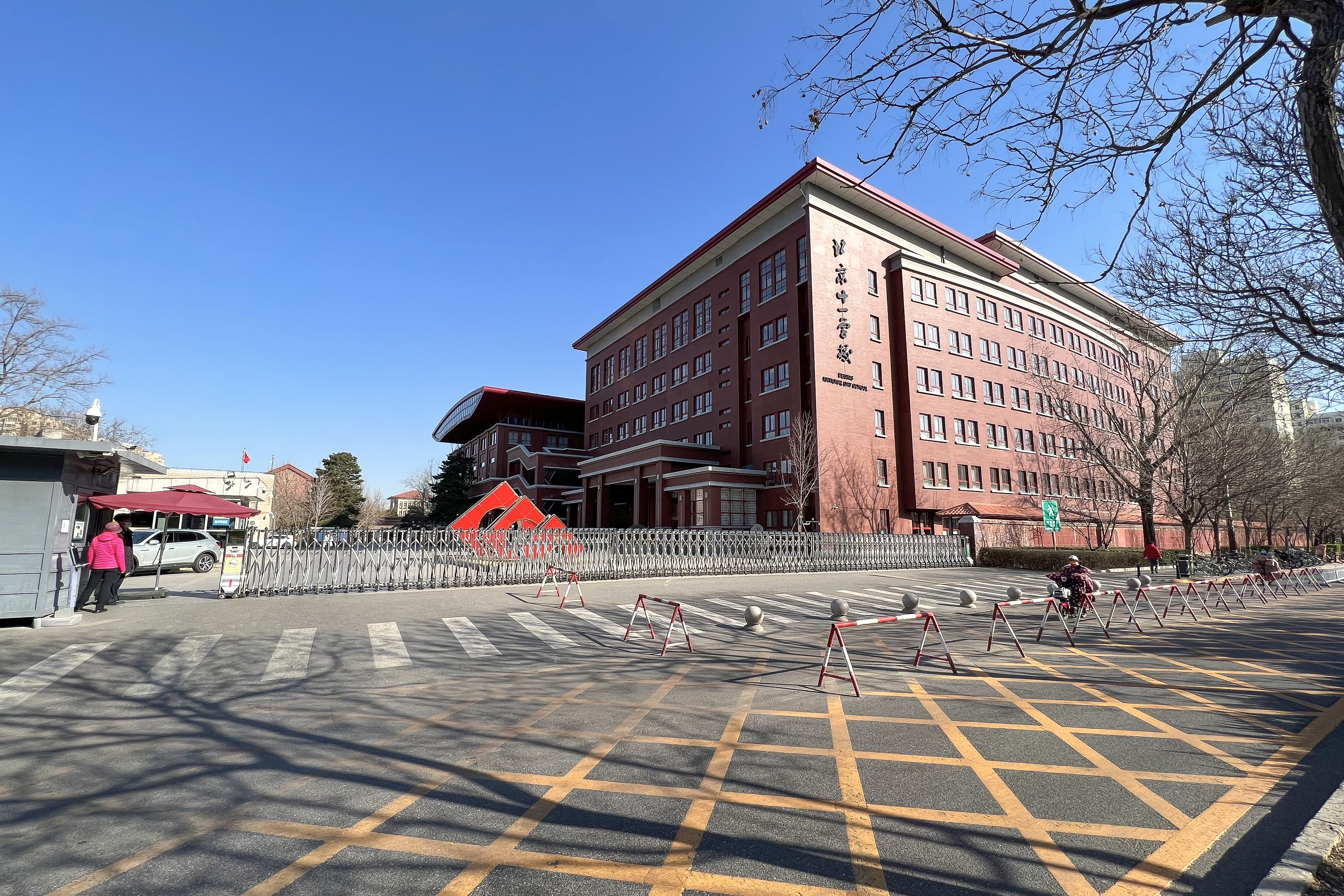
Beijing National Day School within the subdistrict, 2022

Yongdinglu Subdistrict (Chinese: 永定路街道; pinyin: Yǒngdìnglù Jiēdào) is a subdistrict situated on the south side of Haidian District, Beijing, China. It borders Tiancunlu Subdistrict in the north, Wanshoulu Subdistrict in the east and south, and Laoshan Subdistrict to the west. As of 2020, it had 90,879 people residing within it.

The subdistrict was created in June 1979, and its name came from Yongding (Chinese: 永定; lit. 'Eternal Stability') Road that runs through it.

== Administrative Divisions ==
As of 2021, Yongdinglu Subdistrict consisted of 25 communities:

Administrative division code	Subdivision names	Name transliteration
110108002001	一街坊	Yijiefang
110108002004	三街坊东	Sanjiefang Dong
110108002007	三街坊西	Sanjiefang Xi
110108002010	五街坊	Wujiefang
110108002013	七街坊	Qijiefang
110108002016	九街坊	Jiujiefang
110108002017	采石路7号	Caishilu 7 Hao
110108002018	复兴路40号	Fuxinglu 40 Hao
110108002019	复兴路83号	Fuxinglu 83 Hao
110108002020	太平路27号	Taipinglu 27 Hao
110108002021	太平路44号	Taipinglu 44 Hao
110108002022	太平路46号	Taipinglu 46 Hao
110108002023	铁家坟	Tiejiafen
110108002024	金沟河	Jingouhe
110108002025	金沟河路1号院	Jingouhe 1 Haoyuan
110108002026	永金里	Yongjinli
110108002027	永定路26号院	Yongdinglu 26 Haoyuan
110108002029	阜石路第三	Fushilu Disan
110108002030	泽丰苑	Zefengyuan
110108002032	二街坊	Erjiefang
110108002033	四街坊	Sijiefang
110108002034	六街坊	Liujiefang
110108002035	八街坊	Bajiefang
110108002036	新兴年代	Xinxing Niandai
110108002037	永定路	Yongdinglu

== See also ==
- List of township-level divisions of Beijing
