= Wanquanhe Qiao station =

Beijing Subway Line 16 station

Wanquanhe Qiao 万泉河桥
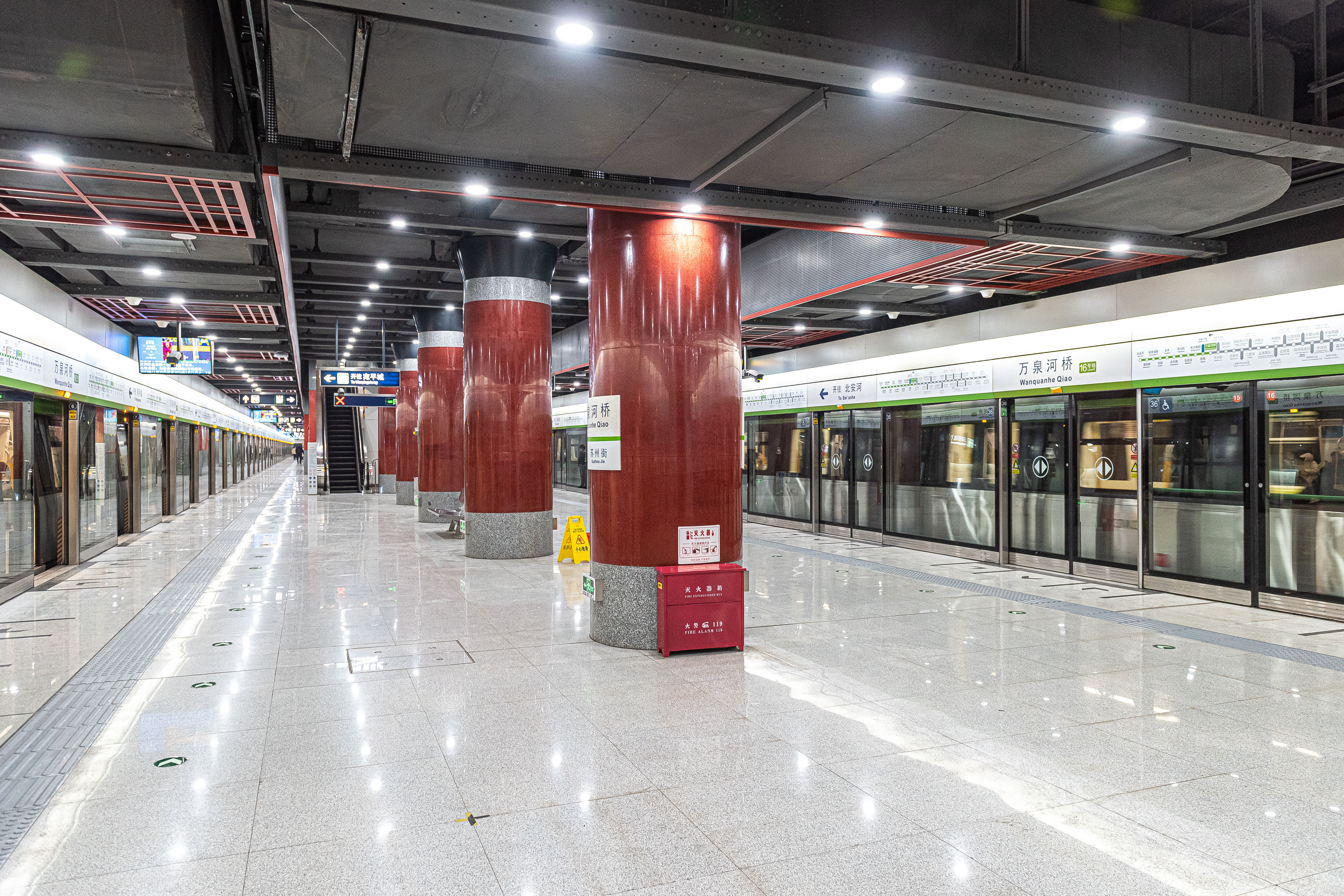
- Station platform

General information
- Location: Wanquanhe Bridge (万泉河桥); Intersection of 4th Ring Road and Wanquanhe Rd., Haidian District, Beijing; China
- Coordinates: 39°59′02″N 116°17′35″E
- Operator: Beijing MTR Metro Line 16 Corp., Ltd.
- Line: Line 16
- Platforms: 2 (1 island platform)
- Tracks: 2

Construction
- Structure type: Underground
- Accessible: Yes

History
- Opened: December 31, 2020; 5 years ago

Services
Preceding station	Beijing Subway	Following station
Xi Yuan towards Bei'anhe	Line 16	Suzhou Jie towards Wanpingcheng
Location
- Location within Beijing

Wanquanhe Qiao station (Chinese: 万泉河桥站; pinyin: Wànquánhé Qiáo zhàn) is a station on Line 16 of the Beijing Subway.

== History ==
=== Planning ===
In 2011, the original plan for line 16 was to go past Changchunyuan Park then turn south, going along Yiheyuan Road after passing Haidian Stadium, then going past Suzhoujie station. The station was originally called Haidianqiao station. However, the planned line went near Peking University, which had vibration issues with its precision instruments when Line 4 was built east of the campus. In 2011, the precision instruments was already affected by a smaller area reconstruction's vibration, and because Line 16 would only be 200 meters away from Peking University, the precision instruments would be severely affected by the line, and scientific work would be severely disrupted. Because of this, the Beijing Municipal Planning Commission studied the vibrational impact of the campus precision instruments, and NPC deputies submitted a proposal in 2012.

On August 5, 2013, the Beijing Municipal Planning Commission announced a proposal for rerouting Line 16 between Xiyuan and Suzhoujie stations. The line was to turn south, going under Haidian Town, then turning east at Haidian Park, going under Wanquanhe Bridge, then turning south at Suzhou Street. The station will be under Wanquanhe Bridge. Previous studies has shown that the line cannot meet Peking University's vibration and noise reduction measures. In December 2013, the final plan was released, which included Wanquanheqiao station.

=== Construction ===
Construction of this station started on September 6, 2014. The station was connected to Xiyuan station in March 2017. The station opened on 31 December 2020.

== Station layout ==
The station has an underground island platform. There are 3 exits, lettered A, B and C. Exit A is accessible via an elevator.
