= Haidian Wuluju station =

Beijing Subway station

Haidian Wuluju 海淀五路居
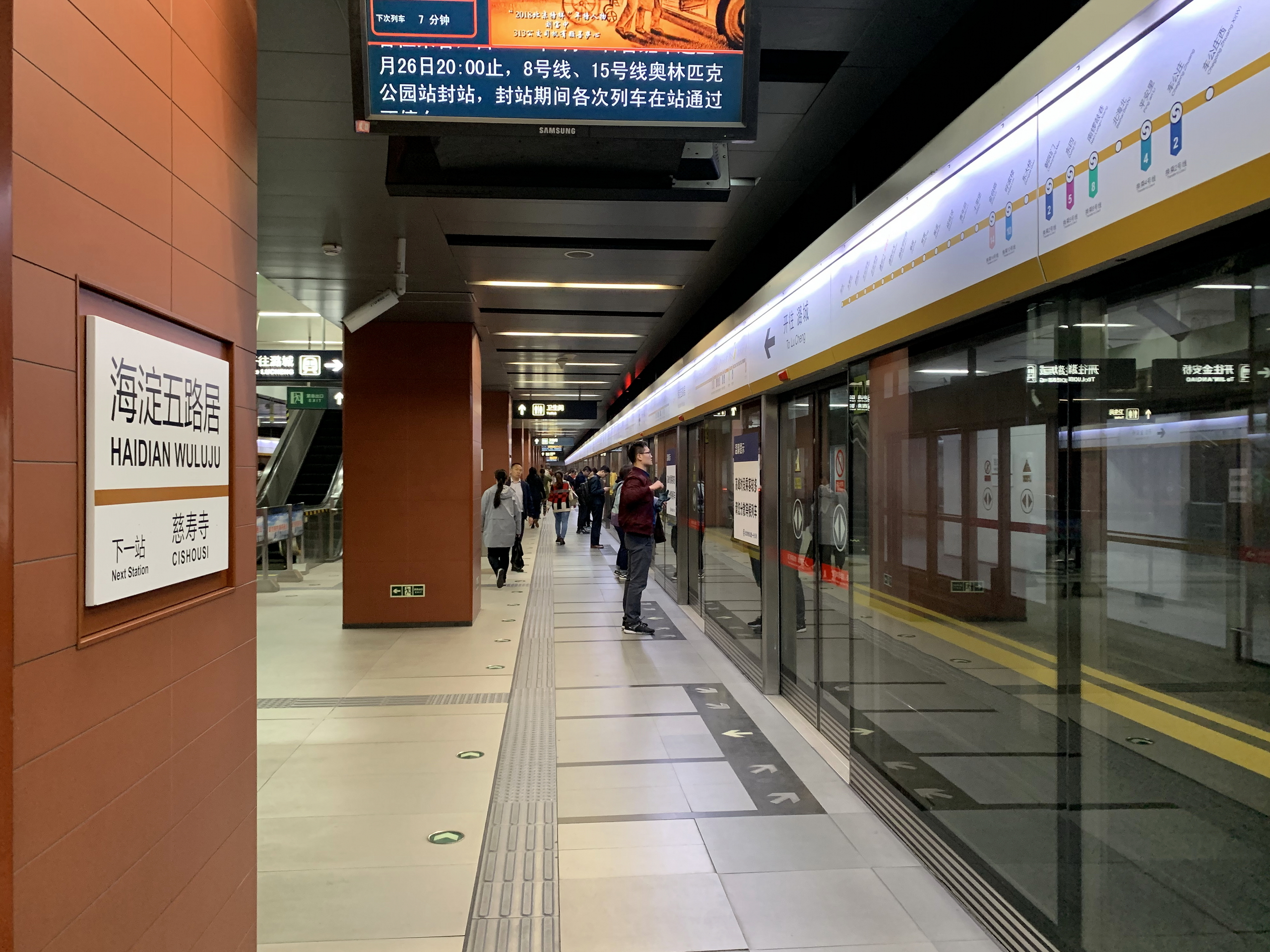
- Platform

General information
- Location: Linglong Road (玲珑路) and West 4th Ring Road North; Haidian District, Beijing; China
- Coordinates: 39°55′57″N 116°16′36″E
- Operator: Beijing Mass Transit Railway Operation Corporation Limited
- Line: Line 6
- Platforms: 4 (1 island platform and 2 side platforms, only the island platform in use)
- Tracks: 2

Construction
- Structure type: Underground
- Accessible: Yes

History
- Opened: December 30, 2012; 13 years ago

Services
Preceding station	Beijing Subway	Following station
Tiancun towards Jin'anqiao	Line 6	Cishou Si towards Luyang
Location
- Location within Beijing

Haidian Wuluju (Chinese: 海淀五路居站; pinyin: Hǎidiàn Wǔlùjū Zhàn) is a station on Line 6 of the Beijing Subway. It was opened on December 30, 2012. The station was the terminus of the line until it was extended west to Jin'anqiao on December 30, 2018.

== Station layout ==
The platform of this station is a Spanish-style platform layout. The side platforms on both sides are for passengers to get off, and the middle island platform is for passengers to get on. With the opening of the west extension of Line 6 to Jin'anqiao Station, the station only retains island platforms for getting on and off passengers, while the original two side platforms are closed.

== Exits ==
There are 4 exits, lettered A, B, C, and D. Exit D is accessible.

== Gallery ==
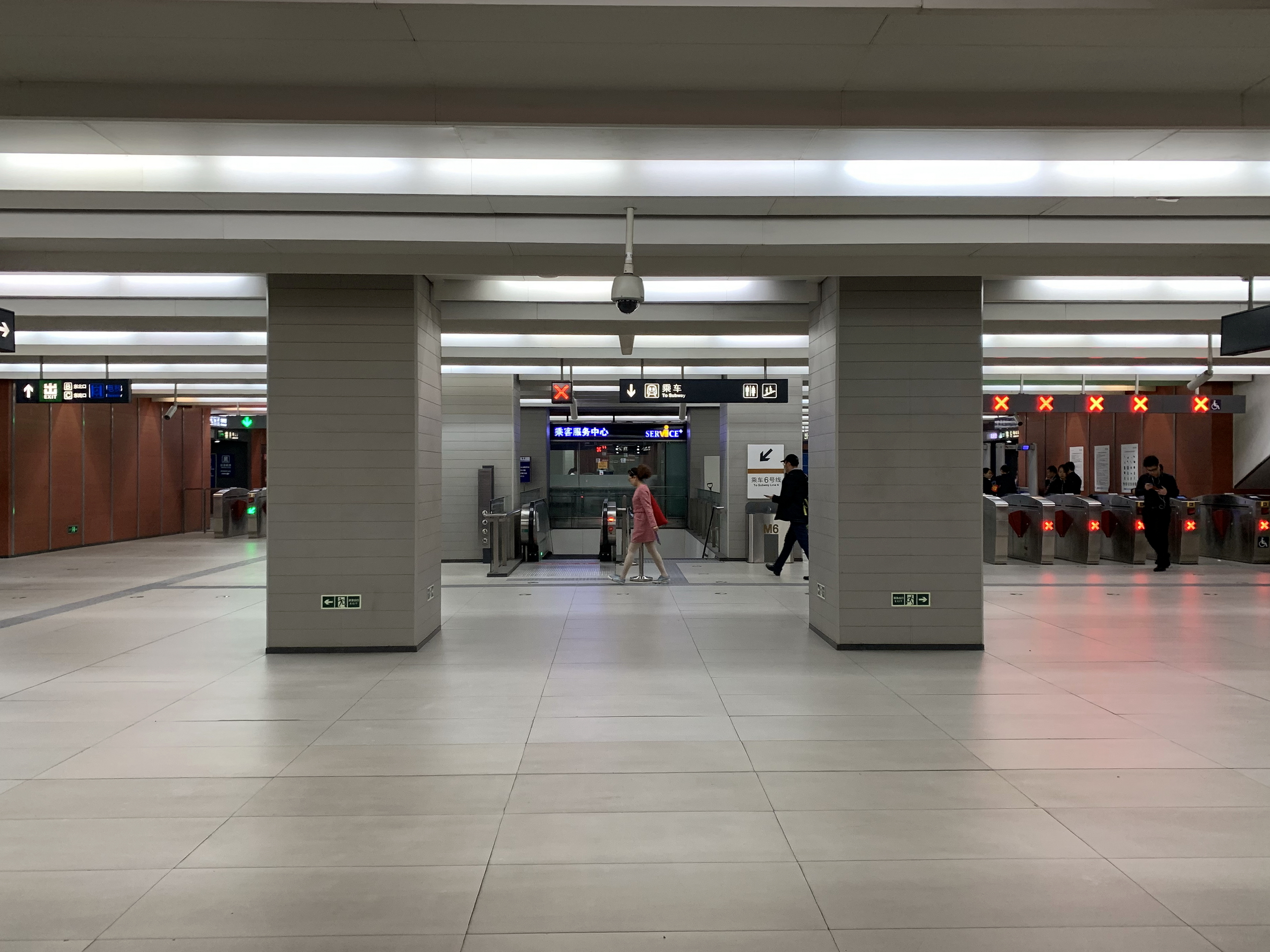
station hall

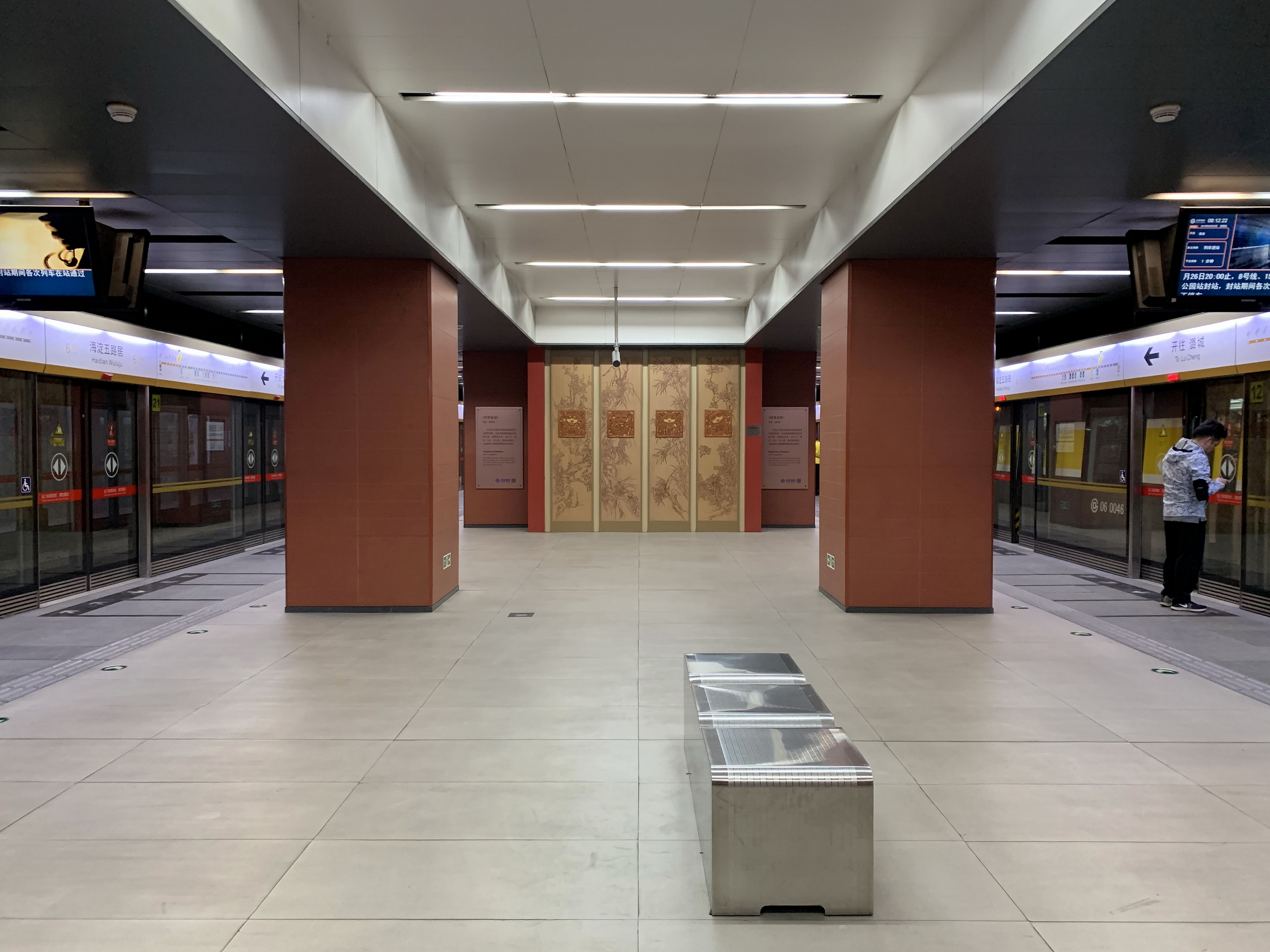
station platform

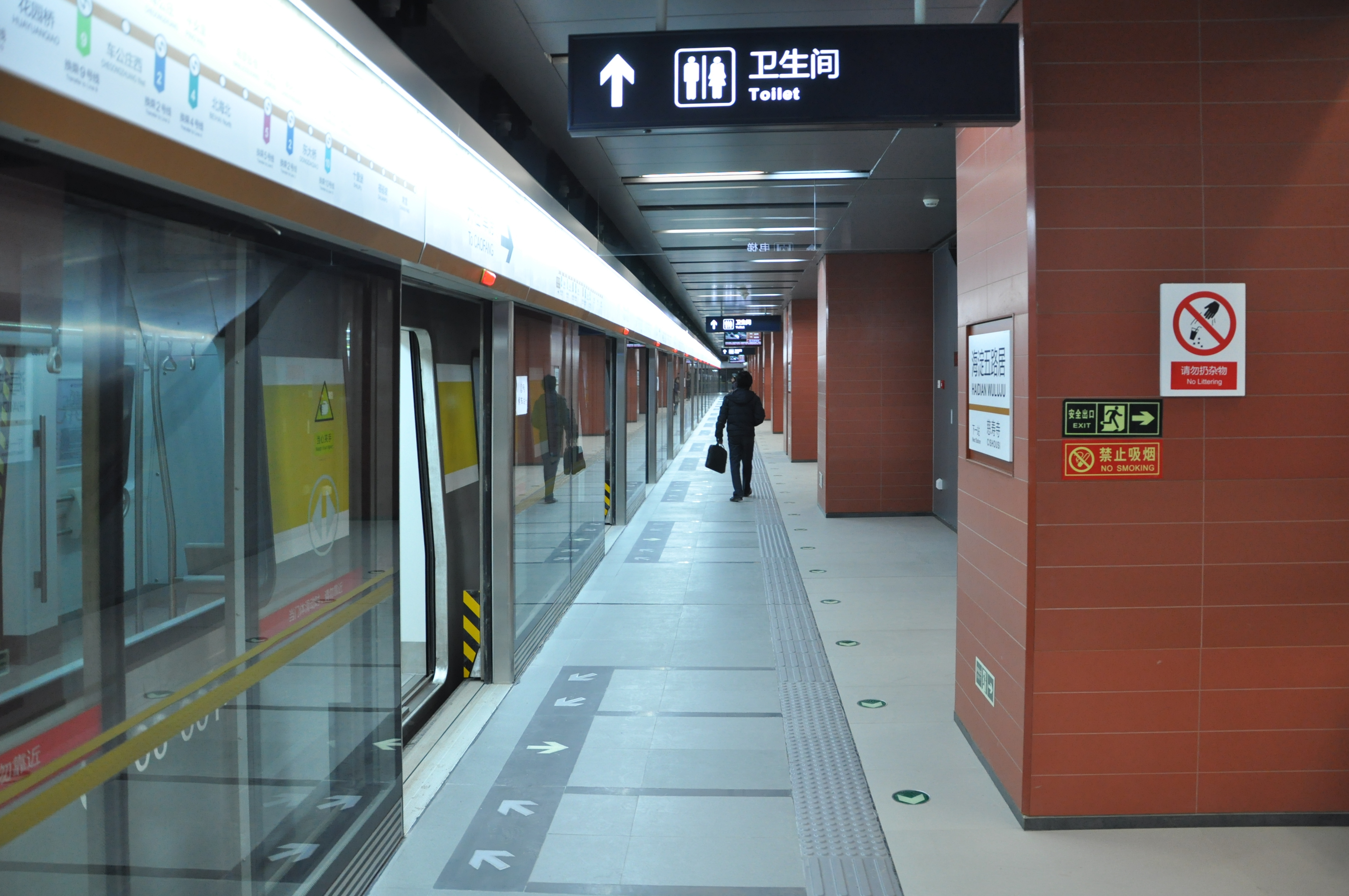
station platform
