= Haidian, Beijing =

Haidian 海淀区
- District
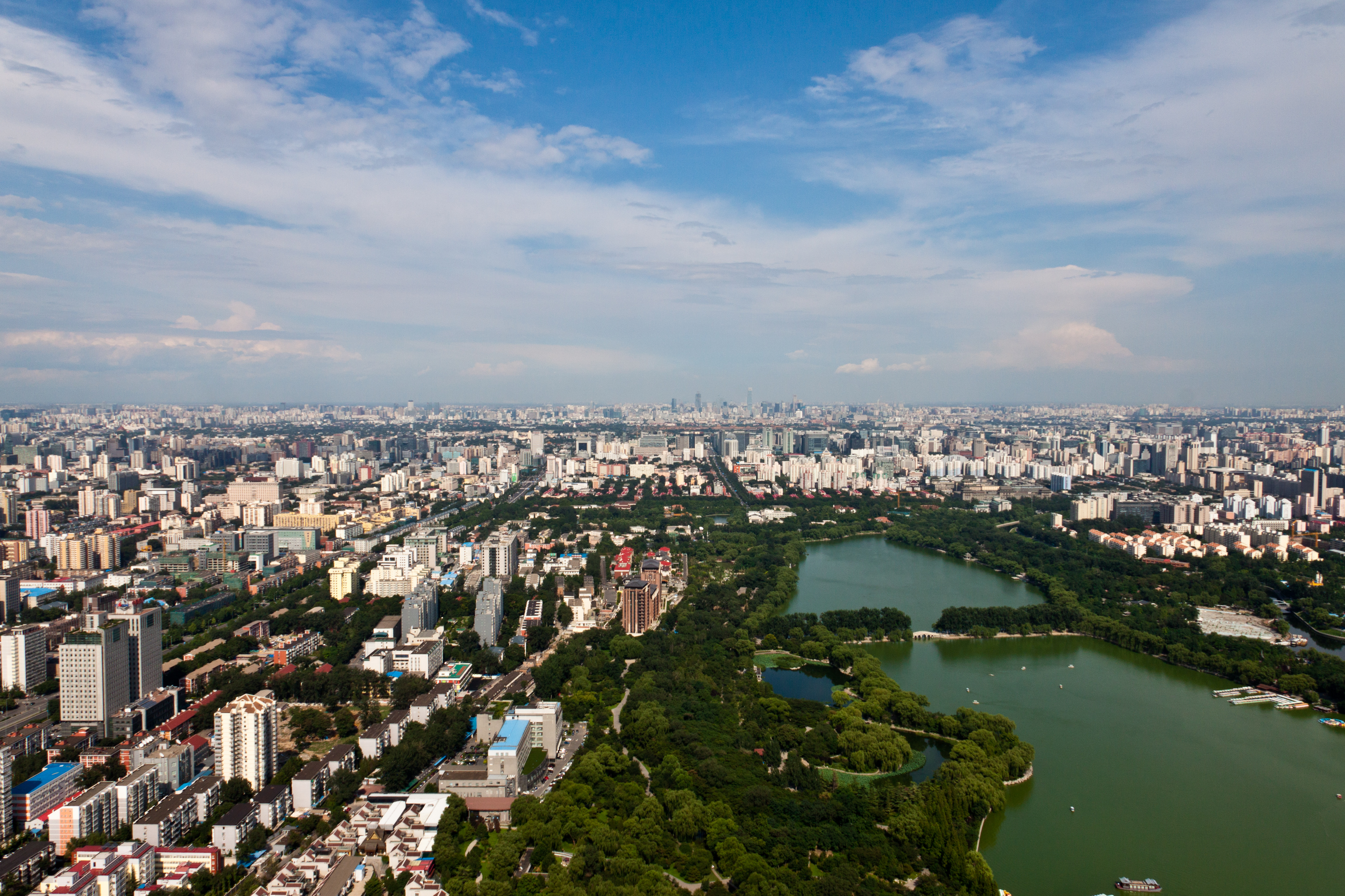
- Haidian District

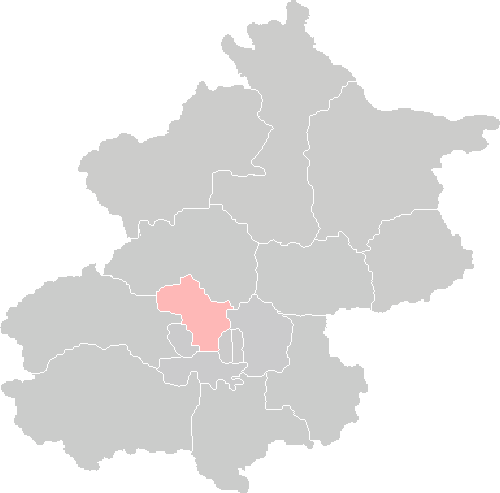
- Location of Haidian District in Beijing
- Interactive map of Haidian
- Coordinates (Haidian government): 39°57′36″N 116°17′54″E
- Country: People's Republic of China
- Municipality: Beijing
- Township-level divisions: 22 subdistricts 5 towns 2 townships

Area
  - Total: 431 km^{2} (166 sq mi)

Population (2020)
  - Total: 3,133,469
  - Density: 7,270/km^{2} (18,800/sq mi)
- Time zone: UTC+8 (China Standard)
- Postal code: 100080
- Area code: 0010
- Website: bjhd.gov.cn

Haidian (Chinese: 海淀区; pinyin: Hǎidiàn Qū) is a northwest urban district of Beijing, bordering Xicheng and Fengtai.

It is 431 km^{2} (166 sq mi) in area, making it the second-largest district in urban Beijing area (after Chaoyang), and is home to 3,133,469 inhabitants as of November 2020. According to the latest 2025 census data, the population of Haidian District is 3.122 million.

== Administrative division ==
Haidian is divided into 22 subdistricts and 7 towns.

Name	Chinese (S)	Hanyu Pinyin	Population (2020)	Area (km^{2})
Wanshoulu Subdistrict	万寿路街道	Wànshòulù Jiēdào	121,453	8.90
Yongdinglu Subdistrict	永定路街道	Yǒngdìnglu Jiēdào	90,879	0.70
Yangfangdian Subdistrict	羊坊店街道	Yángfāngdiàn Jiēdào	120,302	6.61
Ganjiakou Subdistrict	甘家口街道	Gānjiākǒu Jiēdào	117,946	6.50
Balizhuang Subdistrict	八里庄街道	Bālǐzhuāng Jiēdào	133,400	4.40
Zizhuyuan Subdistrict	紫竹院街道	Zǐzhúyuàn Jiēdào	129,367	6.23
Beixiaguan Subdistrict	北下关街道	Běixiàguān Jiēdào	146,366	6.04
Beitaipingzhuang Subdistrict	北太平庄街道	Běitàipíngzhuāng Jiēdào	163,920	5.17
Xueyuanlu Subdistrict	学院路街道	Xuéyuànlù Jiēdào	226,315	8.49
Zhongguancun Subdistrict	中关村街道	Zhōngguāncūn Jiēdào	130,672	6.23
Haidian Subdistrict	海淀街道	Hǎidiàn Jiēdào	123,191	5.00
Qinglongqiao Subdistrict	青龙桥街道	Qīnglóngqiáo Jiēdào	84,221	15.50
Qinghuayuan Subdistrict	清华园街道	Qīnghuáyuán Jiēdào	56,592	2.70
Yanyuan Subdistrict	燕园街道	Yànyuán Jiēdào	29,779	1.84
Xiangshan Subdistrict	香山街道	Xiāngshān Jiēdào	28,535	25.37
Qinghe Subdistrict	清河街道	Qīnghé Jiēdào	147,395	9.37
Huayuanlu Subdistrict	花园路街道	Huāyuánlù Jiēdào	139,362	6.30
Xisanqi Subdistrict	西三旗街道	Xīsānqí Jiēdào	157,642	8.70
Malianwa Subdistrict	马连洼街道	Mǎliánwā Jiēdào	119,022	5.50
Tiancunlu Subdistrict	田村路街道	Tiáncūnlù Jiēdào	108,088	7.70
Shangdi Subdistrict	上地街道	Shàngdì Jiēdào	67,139	9.40
Shuguang Subdistrict	曙光街道	Shǔguāng Jiēdào	86,181	9.61
Haidian Town	海淀镇	Hǎidiàn Zhèn	2,022	41.90
Dongsheng Town	东升镇	Dōngshēng Zhèn	58,151	45.20
Wenquan Town	温泉镇	Wēnquán Zhèn	69,165	33.23
Sijiqing Town	四季青(镇)地区	Sìjìqīng Zhèn	162,700	40.83
Xibeiwang Town	西北旺镇	Xīběiwàng Zhèn	164,795	51.02
Sujiatuo Town	苏家坨镇	Sūjiātuó Zhèn	78,235	84.51
Shangzhuang Town	上庄镇	Shàngzhuāng Zhèn	71,554	38.45

== History ==
According to historical accounts, the name Haidian reflects the region's water-rich geography: the character '海' (hǎi) evokes a broad, sea-like expanse, while '淀' (diàn) refers to marshes or shallow ponds, both of which were once characteristic of the area.

Haidian was originally a village outside of Beijing's Inner City. It was first built in the Yuan dynasty and became one of the eight major business areas of the capital during the Qing dynasty and was the seat of such old shops as Lotus White, Quanjude and Hongbin House. The famed Old Summer Palace and Summer Palace, two grand imperial gardens are also among its reputed features. It became a university district after the building of the Tsinghua University and Yenching University campus in the early twentieth century. It is mentioned in Lao She's novel Camel Xiangzi as an academic village for students. After the foundation of the People's Republic, it was deliberately developed as a university area, with many of the Yan'an institutions moving there. It officially became an administrative district in June 1954. Since the reform and opening up, it has become the heart of China's IT industry. In the words of Time magazine:

Like Paris' Champs-Élysées or New York's Broadway, Haidian is a celebration of a national myth: China's ability to change itself and become, once again, great among nations.

During the later half of the 1990s, out of the Beijing districts, Haidian had the highest per capita GDP. During that period the GDP of Haidian (1) District grew by double digits each year.

== Transportation ==
The northwestern stretches of the 3rd Ring Road, 4th Ring Road, 5th Ring Road and 6th Ring Road all run through the area.

=== Metro and light rail ===
Haidian is currently served by 14 metro lines of the Beijing Subway and one light rail line:

- Line 1 - Wukesong, Wanshoulu, Gongzhufen 10 , Military Museum 9
- Line 4 - Anheqiao North, Beigongmen, Xiyuan 16 , Yuanmingyuan Park, East Gate of Peking University, Zhongguancun, Haidian Huangzhuang 10 , Renmin University 12 , Weigongcun, National Library 9 16
- Line 6 - Liaogongzhuang, Tiancun, Haidian Wuluju, Cishousi 10 , Huayuanqiao, Baishiqiao South 9 , Erligou 16
- Line 8 - Yuxin, Xixiaokou, Yongtaizhuang
- Line 9 - National Library 4 16 , Baishiqiao South 6 , Baiduizi, Military Museum 1
- Line 10 - Lianhua Qiao, Gongzhufen 1 , Xidiaoyutai, Cishousi 6 , Chedaogou, Changchun Qiao 12 , Huoqiying, Bagou Xijiao , Suzhou Jie 16 , Haidian Huangzhuang 4 , Zhichunli, Zhichun Lu 13 , Xitucheng Changping , Mudanyuan 19 , Jiandemen
- Line 12 - Sijiqing Qiao, Landianchang, Changchun Qiao 10 , Suzhou Qiao 16 , Renmin Daxue 4 , Dazhong Si 13 , Jimen Qiao Changping , Beitaipingzhuang 19
- Line 13 - Dazhong Si 12 , Zhichun Lu 10 , Wudaokou, Shangdi, Qinghe railway station Changping , Xi'erqi Changping
- Line 15 - Qinghua Donglu Xikou, Liudaokou Changping , Beishatan
- Line 16 - Bei'anhe, Wenyanglu, Daoxianghulu, Tundian, Yongfeng, Yongfeng South, Xibeiwang, Malianwa 18 , Nongda Nanlu, Xiyuan 4 , Wanquanhe Qiao, Suzhou Jie 10 , Suzhou Qiao 12 , Wanshousi, Guojia Tushuguan (National Library) 4 9 , Erligou 6 , Ganjiakou, Yuyuantan Dongmen (Yuyuantan Park East Gate), Muxidi 1
- Line 18 - Malianwa 16 , Shangdi Software Park, Dongbeiwang
- Line 19 - Mudanyuan 10 , Beitaipingzhuang 12
- Changping line - Xi'erqi 13 , Qinghe railway station 13 , Zhufangbei, Qinghe Xiaoyingqiao, Xuezhiyuan, Liudaokou 15 , Xueyuanqiao, Xitucheng 10 , Jimen Qiao 12
- Xijiao line - Fragrant Hills, Botanical Garden, Wan'an, Chapeng, West Gate of Summer Palace, Bagou 10

=== Suburban Railway ===
Haidian is served by one commuter line operated by Beijing Suburban Railway (BCR).

- Huairou–Miyun line - Qinghe railway station

== Government and infrastructure ==
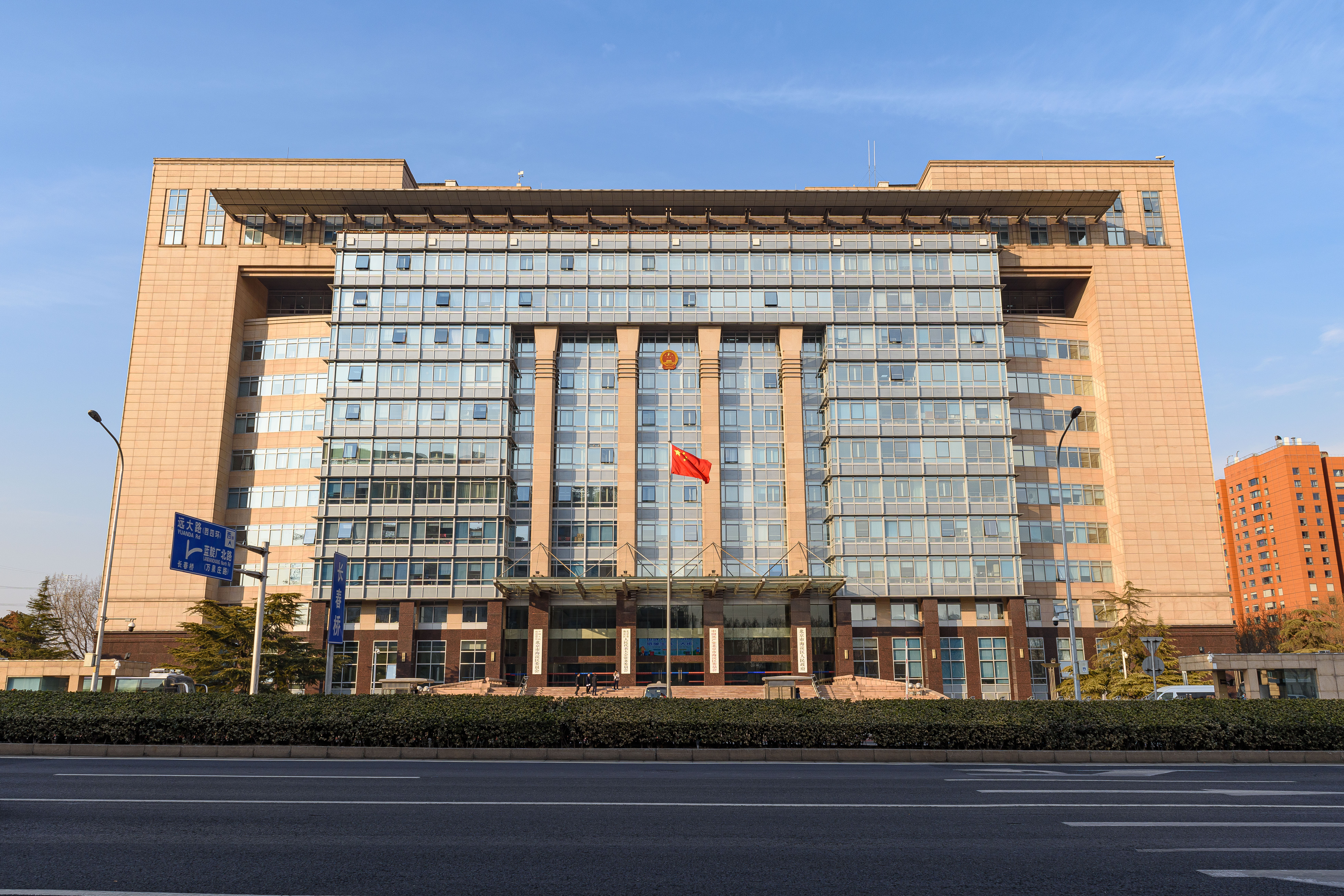
The Haidian District government headquarters

The China National Space Administration has its headquarters in the district. The Beijing Aerospace Flight Control Center which serves as the central command center for the Chinese space program is also located in the district.

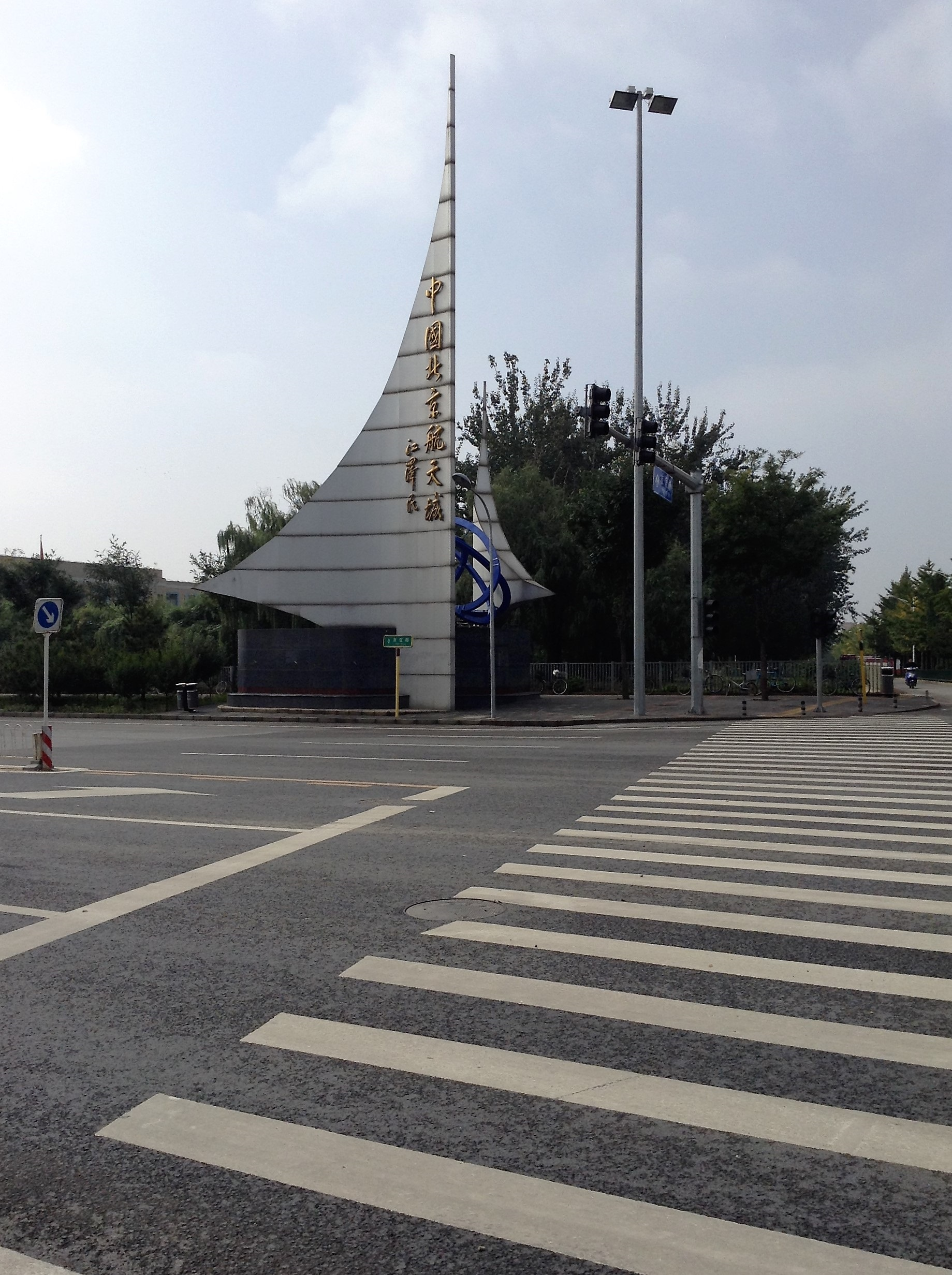
Entrance to the Beijing Aerospace Flight Control Center

The Ministry of Science and Technology is located in Yangfangdian, neighboring the China Central Television building (completed in 1986) within the district. The China National Intellectual Property Administration has its headquarters in Haidian, near Jimen Bridge. The State Administration of Foreign Experts Affairs (SAFEA) was formerly located in Zhongguancun.

The People's Liberation Army Military Music Hall is located in the district.

The Ministry of State Security has a number of major facilities in the district.

== Economy ==
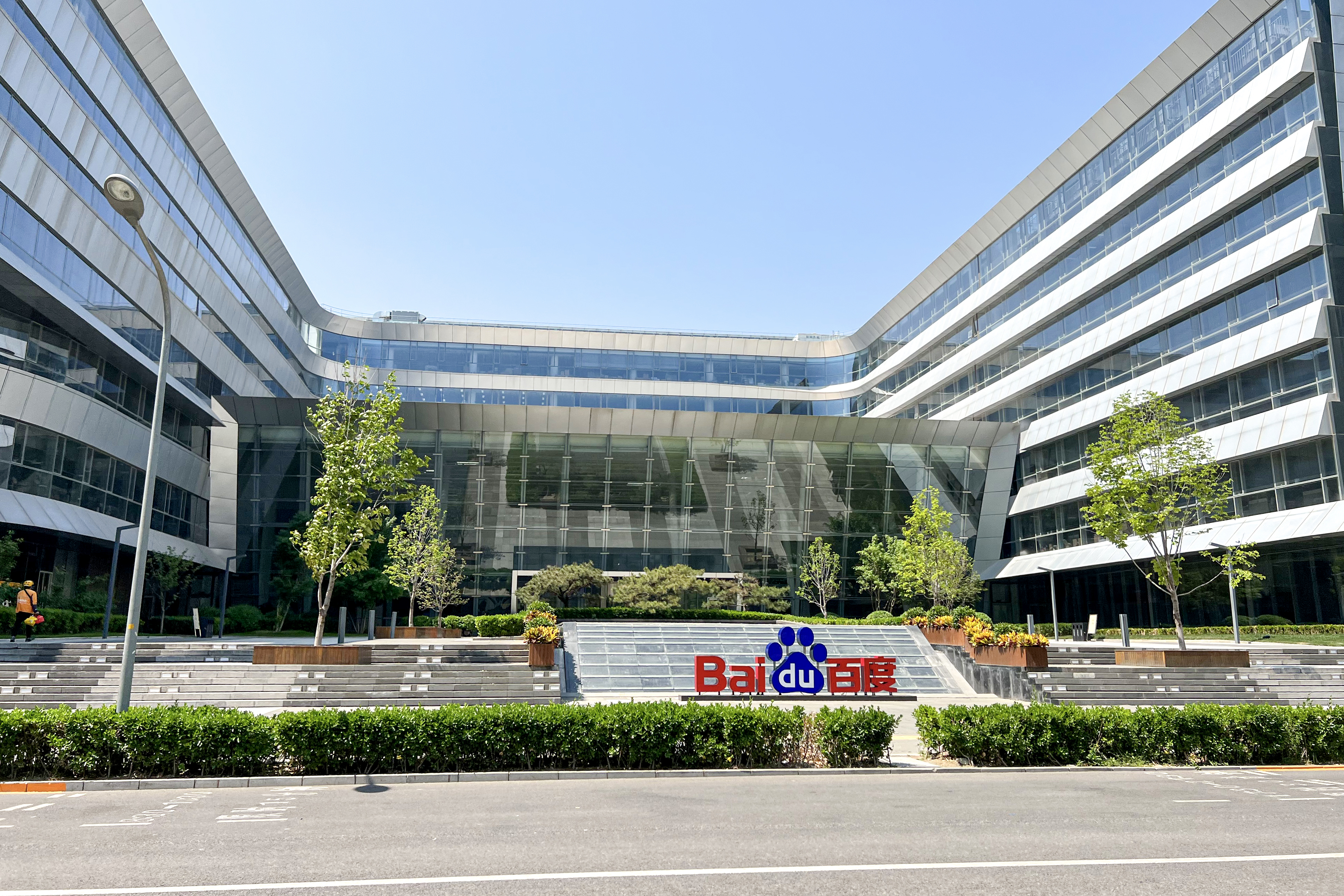
Baidu global headquarters

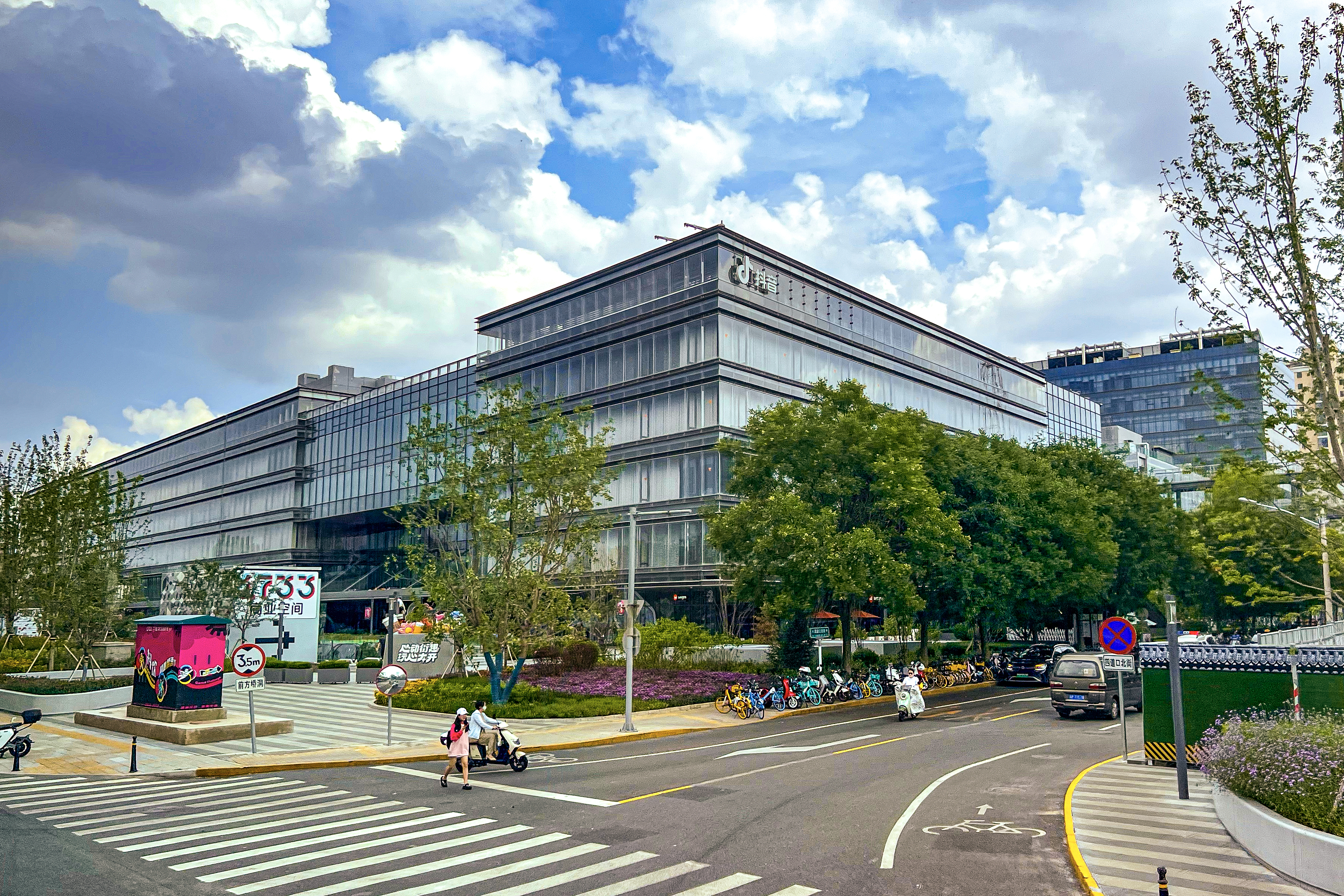
ByteDance global headquarters, Dazhongsi Square (1733 Commercial Space)

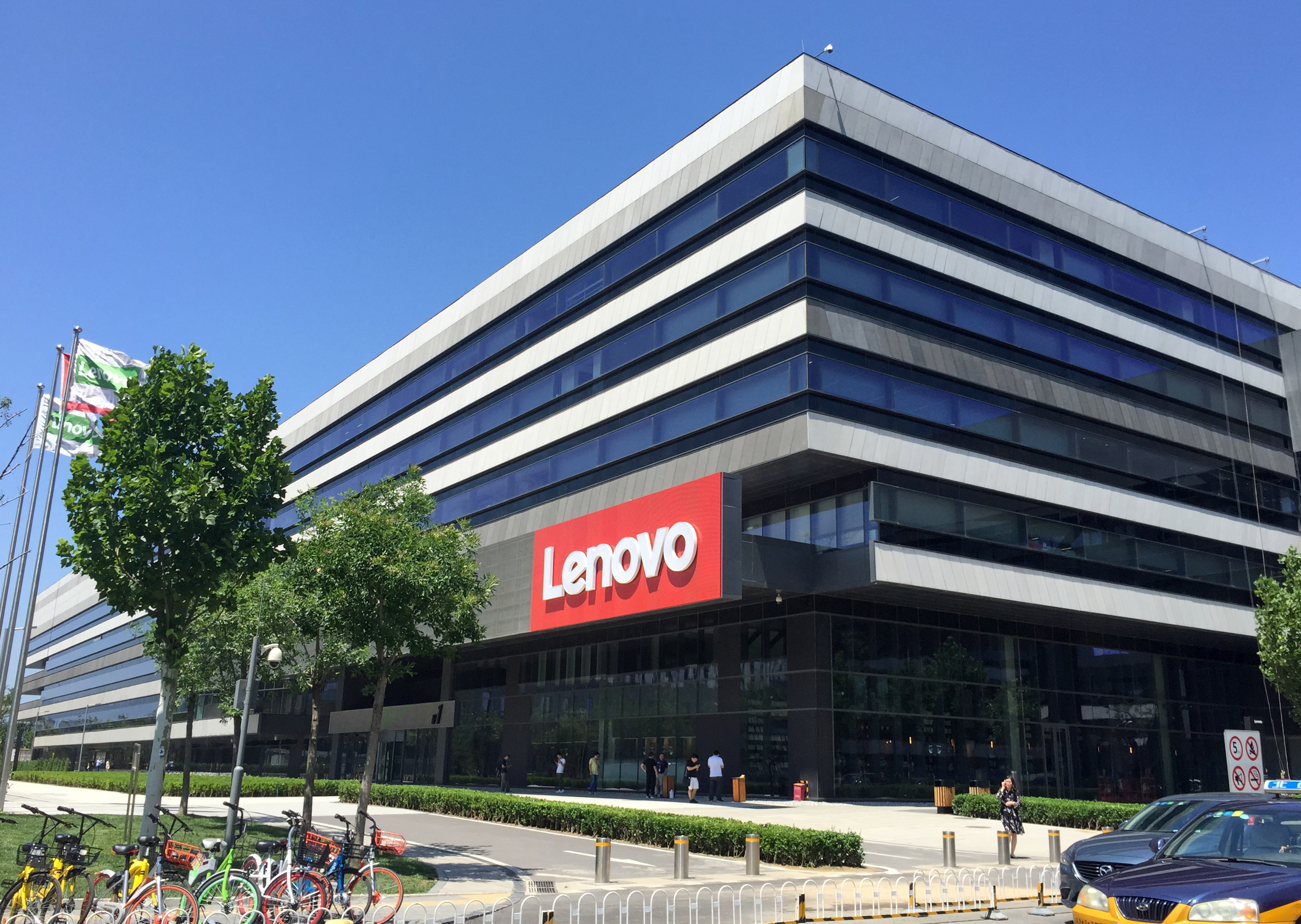
Lenovo global headquarters

In 2017, the regional GDP was 592.48 billion yuan, with a GDP per capita at 170.8 thousand yuan (25293 US dollars).

A central part of Haidian's economy, the Zhongguancun electronics district, hosts the Beijing offices of many software and computer-technology companies.

- Baidu has its headquarters in the Baidu Campus.
- ByteDance (developer of Douyin / TikTok) has its global headquarters at Dazhongsi Square, Haidian District.
- Google has its Beijing office in Tsinghua Science Park Bldg 6
- Lenovo has its global headquarters in Lenovo Campus, Haidian District.
- Sohu has its headquarters in the Sohu.com Internet Plaza.
- Sinosteel's headquarters are in the Sinosteel Plaza (中钢国际广场) in Haidian District.
- Youku has its headquarters on the fifth floor of Sinosteel Plaza.
- Wumart has its headquarters in the Wumart Commercial Building (物美商业大厦; Wù Měi Shāngyè Dàshà) in Haidian District.
- aigo's head office is in the Ideal Plaza (理想国际大厦) in the Haidian District.
- China Postal Airlines has its headquarters on the 11th through 14th floors of the Ziyu Office Building (紫玉写字楼) in Haidian District.
- Sinovac Biotech
- The Beijing Civil Aircraft Technology Research Center of COMAC (北京民用飞机技术研究中心) has its offices on the 8th floor of the Beijing Olympic Building (北京奥运大厦) in Haidian District.
- Xiaomi has its headquarters in the Huarun Wucaicheng Office Building (华润五彩城写字楼).
- Nuctech.
- New Oriental
- Everbright International has its Beijing office in the Beijing International Building (北京国际大厦) in Zhongguancun.
- Grab has its Beijing office in Raycom Infotech Park.

== Education ==
=== Higher education ===
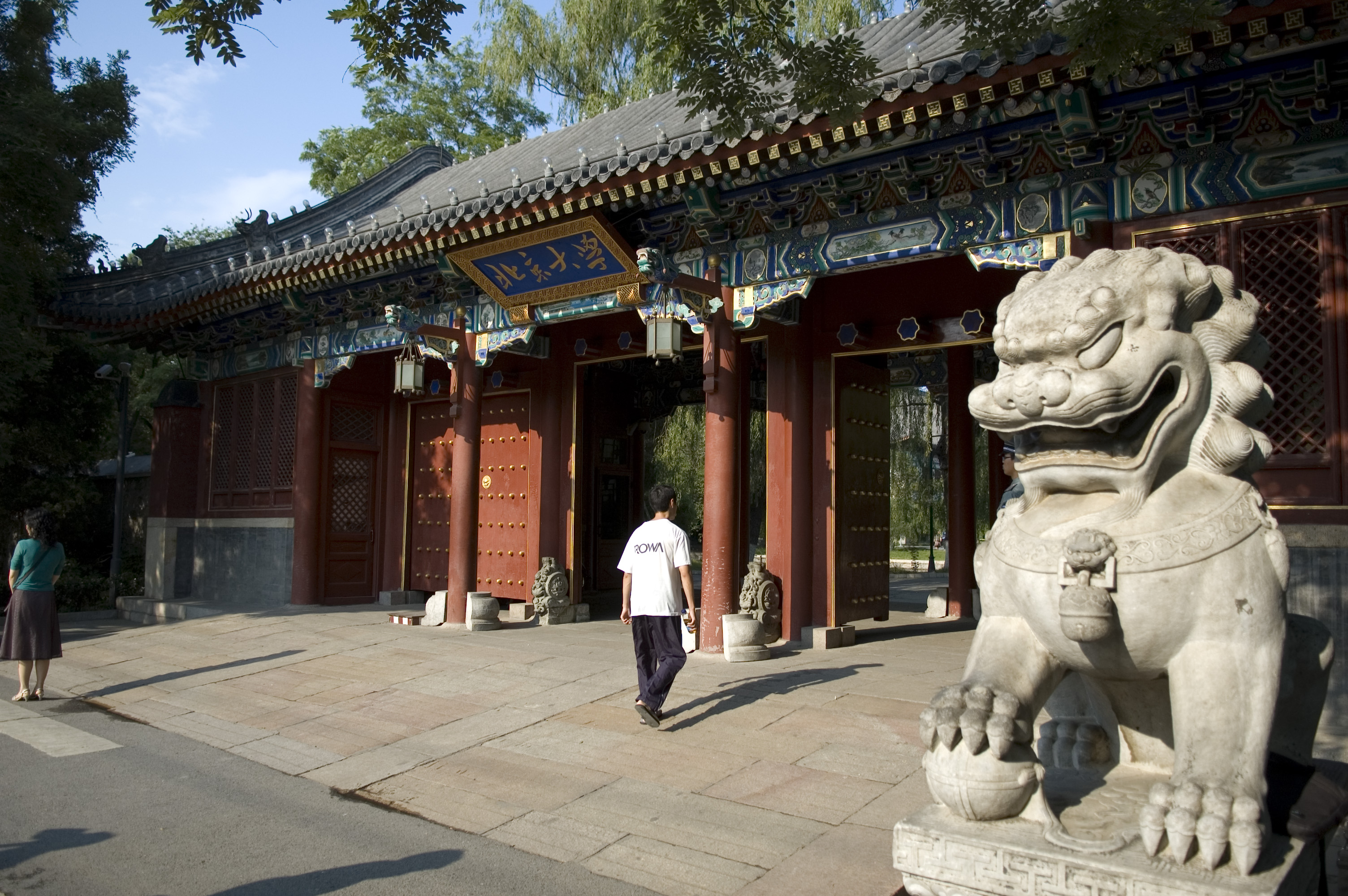
Peking University

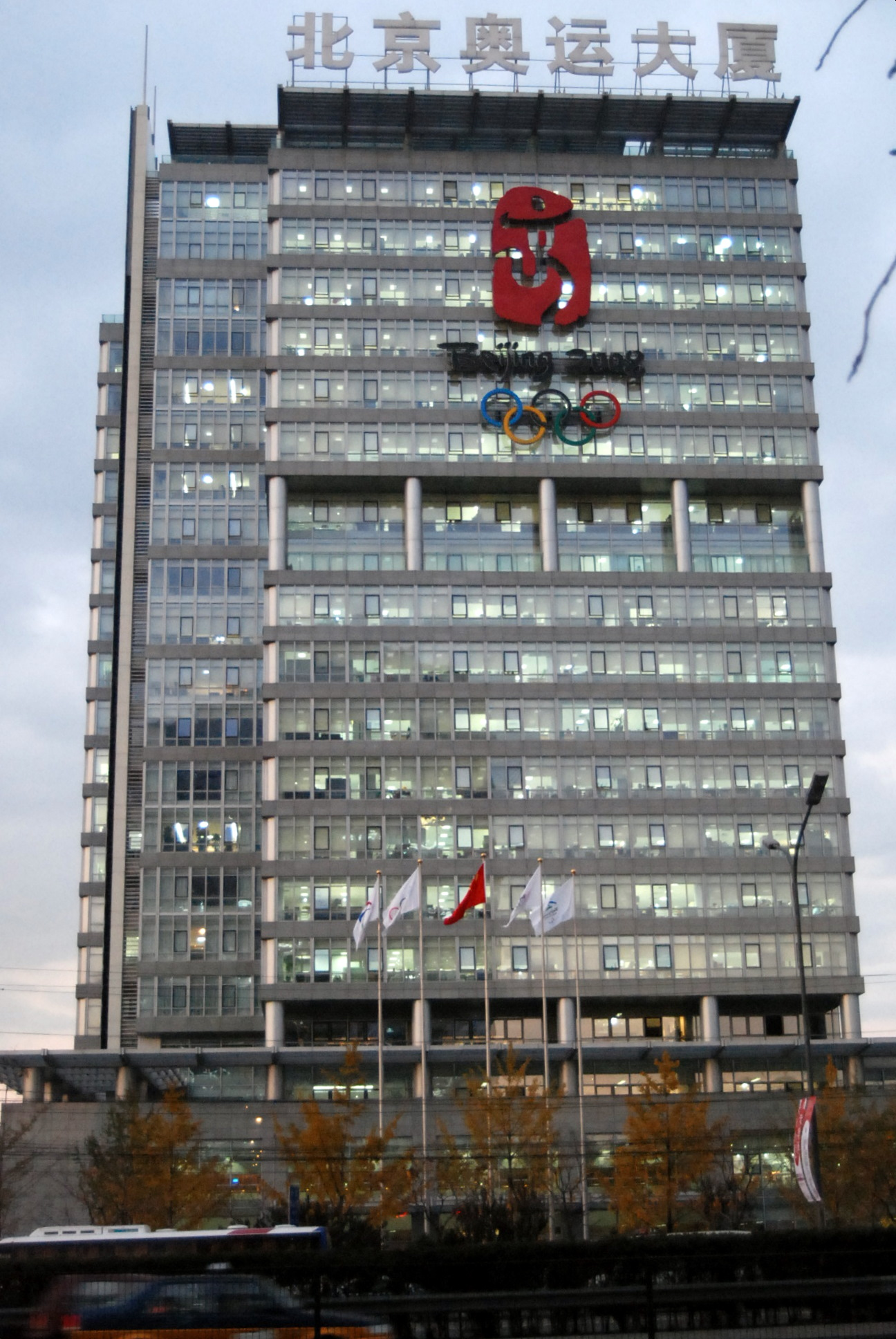
The Beijing Olympic Building, which housed the headquarters of the Beijing Municipal Commission of Education

Institutions of higher education in Haidian include:

- Beihang University (formerly Beijing University of Aeronautics and Astronautics)
- Beijing Film Academy
- Beijing Foreign Studies University
- Beijing Forestry University
- Beijing Institute of Technology
- Beijing Jiaotong University
- Beijing Language and Culture University
- Beijing Normal University
- Beijing Sport University
- Capital Normal University
- China Agricultural University
- China University of Geosciences Beijing
- China University of Political Science and Law
- Minzu University of China
- Peking University
- Renmin University of China
- Tsinghua University
- University of International Relations
- University of Science and Technology Beijing

=== Primary and secondary education ===
The Beijing Municipal Education Commission (北京市教育委员会), the local education authority, has its headquarters in the Beijing Olympic Building.

Institutions of secondary education

- Beijing Bayi School
- Beijing 101 Middle School
- Affiliated High School of Peking University
- The High School Affiliated to Renmin University of China
- Tsinghua University High School

Private schools include:

- Beijing Haidian Foreign Language Shi Yan School (elementary through senior high school)
  - Beijing Haidian International School
- Saint Paul American School

== Communities ==
- Zhongguancun
- Wudaokou
- Madian
- Xinjiangcun (demolished)

== Important areas in Haidian District ==
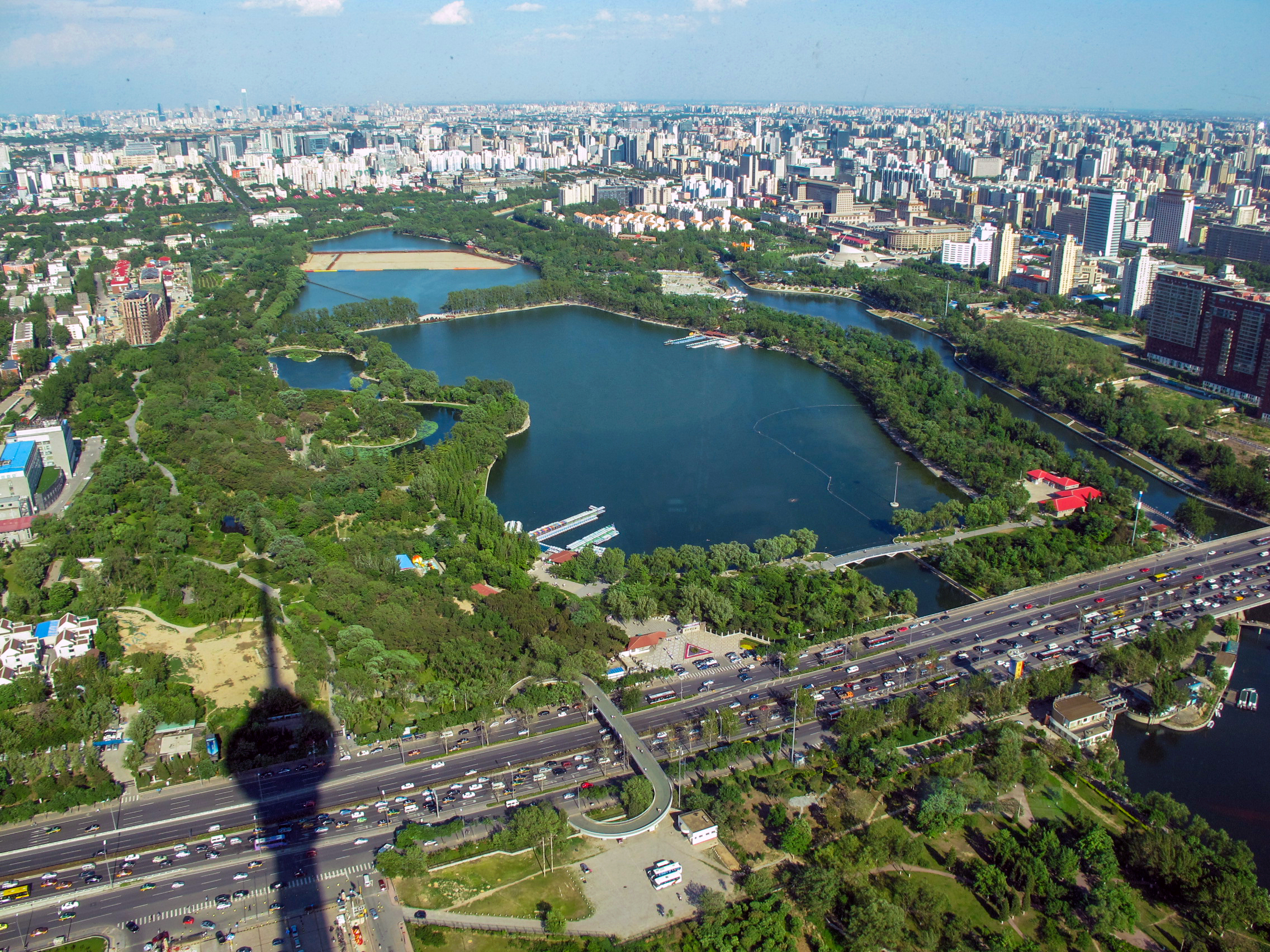
Aerial view of Yuyuantan Park from the Central Radio & TV Tower

- Old Summer Palace (Yuanmingyuan Park)
- Summer Palace (Yiheyuan)
- Fragrant Hills (Xiangshan or Jingyi Palace)
- Beijing Botanical Garden (Beijing Zhiwuyuan)
- Jade Spring Hill (Yuquanshan or Jingming Palace)
- Haidian Park
- Pagoda at the Wuta Temple
- Purple Bamboo Park (Zizhuyuan)
- Yuyuantan Park
- Diaoyutai State Guesthouse
- Baidu headquarters
- Sohu headquarters
- Sinosteel Plaza
- Youku headquarters
- Haidian Christian Church

== Sports ==
The Chinese Ice Hockey Association, which governs ice hockey and bandy in China, has its offices at 56, Zhongguacun South Street in Haidian District.

== Gallery ==
=== Haidian's Technology hubs ===
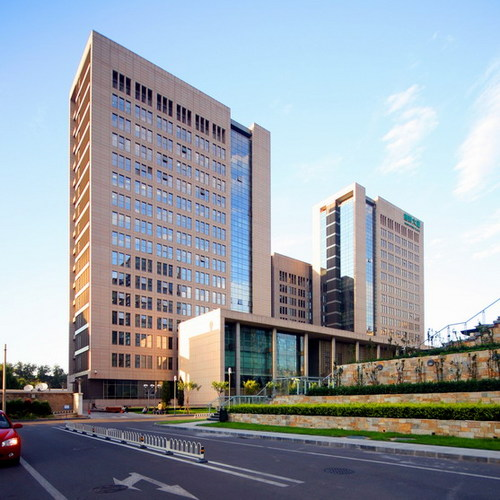

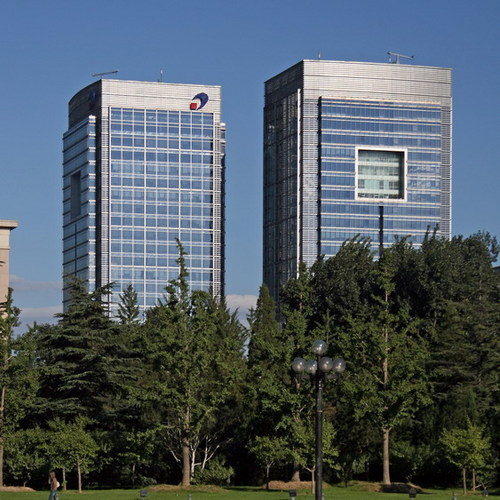

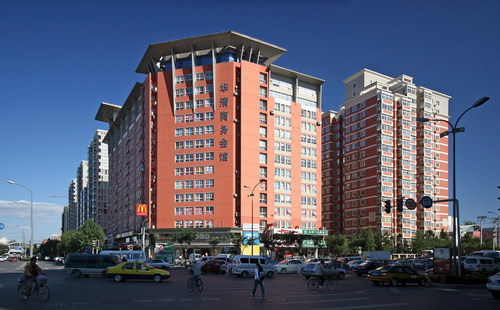

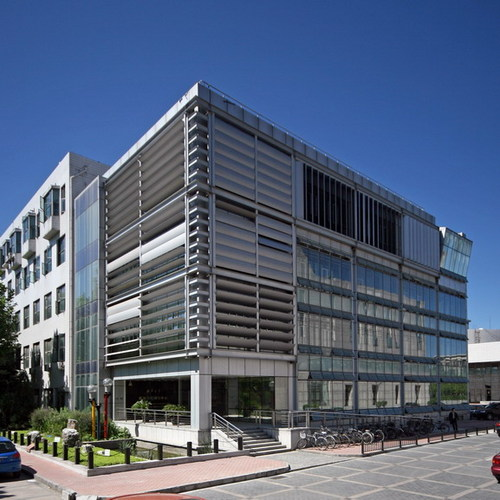

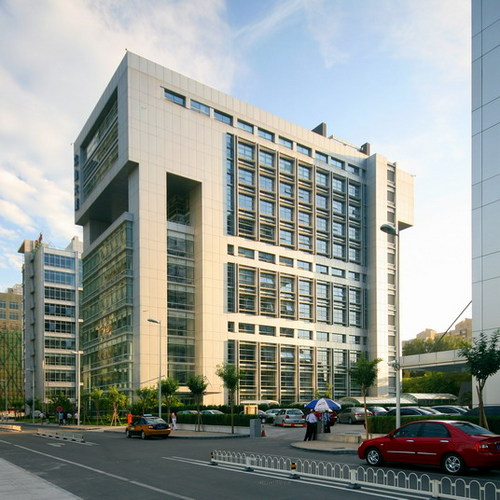

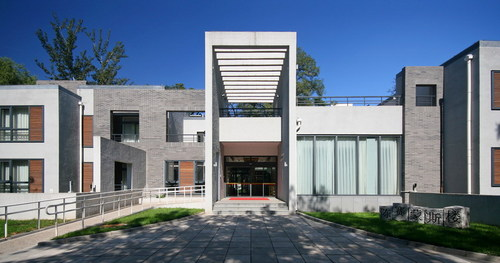

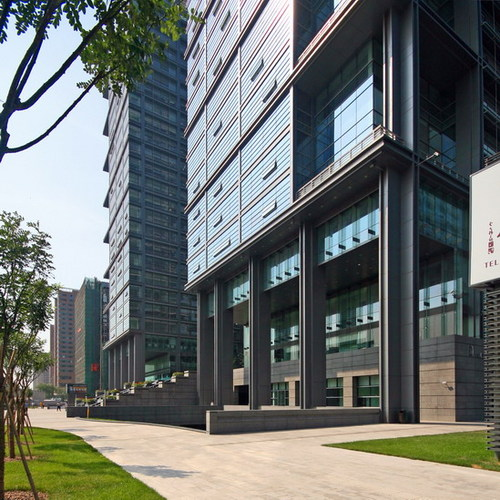

== Climate ==
Haidian has a humid continental climate (Köppen climate classification Dwa). The average annual temperature in Haidian is 12.8 °C (55.0 °F). The average annual rainfall is 557.3 mm (21.94 in) with July as the wettest month. The temperatures are highest on average in July, at around 26.5 °C (79.7 °F), and lowest in January, at around −3.2 °C (26.2 °F).

Climate data for Haidian District, elevation 46 m (151 ft), (1991–2020 normals, extremes 1961–present)
Month	Jan	Feb	Mar	Apr	May	Jun	Jul	Aug	Sep	Oct	Nov	Dec	Year
Record high °C (°F)	14.7 (58.5)	26.7 (80.1)	30.1 (86.2)	34.2 (93.6)	41.2 (106.2)	40.2 (104.4)	41.7 (107.1)	39.1 (102.4)	37.9 (100.2)	31.0 (87.8)	23.2 (73.8)	19.6 (67.3)	41.7 (107.1)
Mean daily maximum °C (°F)	2.7 (36.9)	6.5 (43.7)	13.4 (56.1)	21.3 (70.3)	27.6 (81.7)	31.0 (87.8)	32.0 (89.6)	31.2 (88.2)	26.8 (80.2)	19.5 (67.1)	10.6 (51.1)	4.0 (39.2)	18.9 (66.0)
Daily mean °C (°F)	−2.7 (27.1)	0.6 (33.1)	7.4 (45.3)	15.1 (59.2)	21.2 (70.2)	25.1 (77.2)	26.9 (80.4)	25.9 (78.6)	20.8 (69.4)	13.3 (55.9)	4.9 (40.8)	−1.1 (30.0)	13.1 (55.6)
Mean daily minimum °C (°F)	−7.1 (19.2)	−4.3 (24.3)	1.8 (35.2)	8.8 (47.8)	14.8 (58.6)	19.7 (67.5)	22.6 (72.7)	21.6 (70.9)	15.9 (60.6)	8.3 (46.9)	0.3 (32.5)	−5.2 (22.6)	8.1 (46.6)
Record low °C (°F)	−20.2 (−4.4)	−19.5 (−3.1)	−10.7 (12.7)	−4.5 (23.9)	3.4 (38.1)	9.6 (49.3)	15.8 (60.4)	13.9 (57.0)	4.0 (39.2)	−3.6 (25.5)	−12.7 (9.1)	−18.9 (−2.0)	−20.2 (−4.4)
Average precipitation mm (inches)	2.1 (0.08)	5.6 (0.22)	9.6 (0.38)	21.6 (0.85)	34.7 (1.37)	84.8 (3.34)	209.5 (8.25)	119.7 (4.71)	53.3 (2.10)	27.8 (1.09)	15.1 (0.59)	2.5 (0.10)	586.3 (23.08)
Average precipitation days (≥ 0.1 mm)	1.3	2.3	2.8	4.5	6.1	10.3	13.1	11.0	7.5	5.0	3.0	1.5	68.4
Average snowy days	2.4	2.2	1.1	0.1	0	0	0	0	0	0	1.5	2.4	9.7
Average relative humidity (%)	43	42	41	43	48	60	72	73	67	62	56	46	54
Mean monthly sunshine hours	183.1	183.6	220.2	233.1	250.5	203.2	170.2	186.9	194.8	188.8	166.0	169.9	2,350.3
Percentage possible sunshine	61	60	59	58	56	45	38	44	53	55	56	59	54
Source: China Meteorological Administration

== Sister cities ==
Since 1992, Haidian District has signed official papers and established Sister City relationship with 14 cities and districts from 10 countries of 4 continents. Some sister cities are shown below:

South America

- Santa Fe, Argentina (May 2010)
- La Falda, Cordoba, Argentina (10 September 2009)

North America

- Cambridge, Massachusetts, United States (8 February 2008)
- Harrisburg, Pennsylvania, United States (15 April 1998)

Europe

- Savonlinna, Finland (9 March 2016)
- Olympia, Peloponnesus, Greece (28 February 2008)
- Groningen, Netherlands (19 October 2004)
- Bures-sur-Yvette, Massy, Palaiseau, in Paris Region, France (4 October 1994)

East Asia

- Seodaemun-gu, Seoul, South Korea (27 September 1995)
- Nerima, Tokyo, Japan (13 October 1992)
