= Wanshoulu Subdistrict =

Wanshoulu Subdistrict 万寿路街道
- Subdistrict
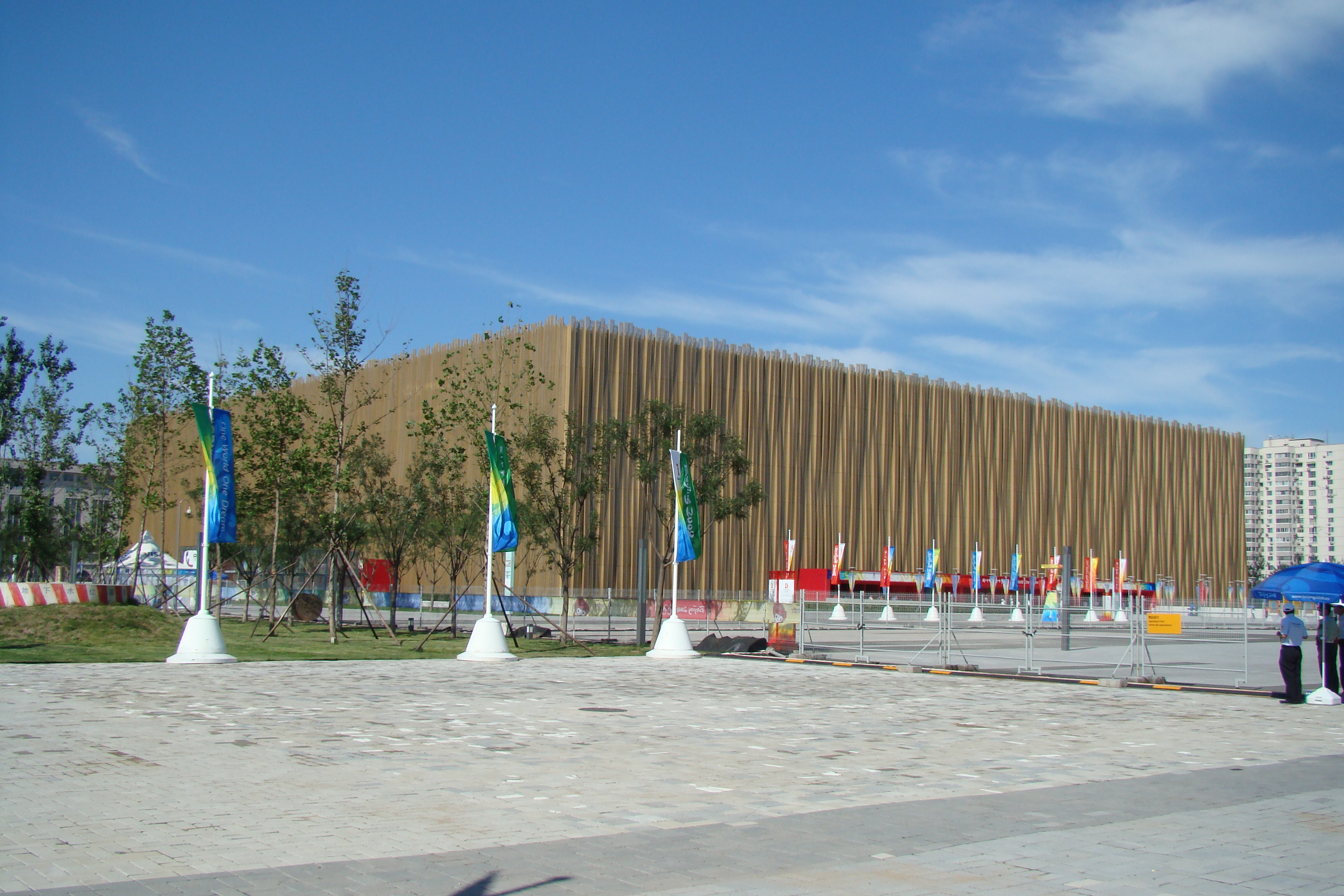
- Wukesong Arena within the subdistrict, 2007

- Location within Beijing Location within China
- Coordinates: 39°54′18″N 116°15′17″E
- Country: China
- Municipality: Beijing
- District: Haidian
- Village-level Divisions: 27 communities

Area
  - Total: 8.86 km^{2} (3.42 sq mi)

Population (2020)
  - Total: 121,453
  - Density: 13,700/km^{2} (35,500/sq mi)
- Time zone: UTC+8 (China Standard)
- Postal code: 100039
- Area code: 010

Wanshoulu Subdistrict (Chinese: 万寿路街道; pinyin: Wànshòulù Jiēdào) is a subdistrict which lies on the southwestern of Haidian District, Beijing, China. It borders Yongding Road, Tiancun Road and Balizhuang Subdistrict to the north, Yangfangdian Subdistrict to the east, Liuliqiao Subdistrict to the south, Babaoshan and Laoshan Subdistricts to the west. Its population was 121,453 as of 2020. The subdistrict was named after Wanshou (Chinese: 万寿; lit. 'Longevity') Road within it.

== History ==
Timeline of Wanshoulu Subdistrict
Year	Status
1937	Part of Xinshi District
1945	Part of Suburban District of Beijing
1949	Part of the 16th District
1950	Part of the 13th District
1952	Part of Haidian District
1957	Established as Shawo Subdistrict, administered area also included today's Yongdinglu Subdistrict
1958	Part of Yuyuantan People's Commune
1962	Restored as a Subdistrict
1979	Northwestern section was split away to form Yongdinglu Subdistrict

== Administrative Divisions ==
In 2021, Wanshoulu Subdistrict was composed of 27 communities:

Administrative division code	Subdivision names	Name transliteration
110108001001	翠微路	Cuiweilu
110108001002	翠微路21号	Cuiweilu 21 Hao
110108001003	复兴路20号	Fuxinglu 20 Hao
110108001004	翠微南里	Cuiwei Nanli
110108001005	翠微中里	Cuiwei Zhongli
110108001006	翠微北里	Cuiwei Beili
110108001007	翠微西里	Cuiwei Xili
110108001008	万寿路	Wanshoulu
110108001009	万寿路28号	Wanshoulu 28 Hao
110108001010	复兴路22号	Fuxinglu 22 Hao
110108001011	复兴路61号	Fuxinglu 61 Hao
110108001012	万寿路8号	Wanshoulu 8 Hao
110108001013	朱各庄10号	Zhugezhuang 10 Hao
110108001014	万寿路甲15号	Wanshoulu Jia 15 Hao
110108001015	朱各庄	Zhugezhuang
110108001016	万寿路1号	Wanshoulu 1 Hao
110108001018	万寿路西街16号	Wanshoulu Xijie 16 Hao
110108001019	复兴路24号	Fuxinglu 24 Hao
110108001020	复兴路26号	Fuxinglu 26 Hao
110108001021	复兴路28号	Fuxinglu 28 Hao
110108001022	今日家园	Jinri Jiayuan
110108001024	太平路24号	Taipinglu 24 Hao
110108001025	太平路22号	Taipinglu 22 Hao
110108001028	复兴路32号	Fuxinglu 32 Hao
110108001029	永定路东里	Yongdinglu Dongli
110108001030	永定路西里	Yongdinglu Xili
110108001038	五棵松紫金长安	Wukesong Zijin Chang'an

== See also ==
- List of township-level divisions of Beijing
