= Balizhuang Subdistrict, Haidian District =

Balizhuang Subdistrict 八里庄街道
- Subdistrict
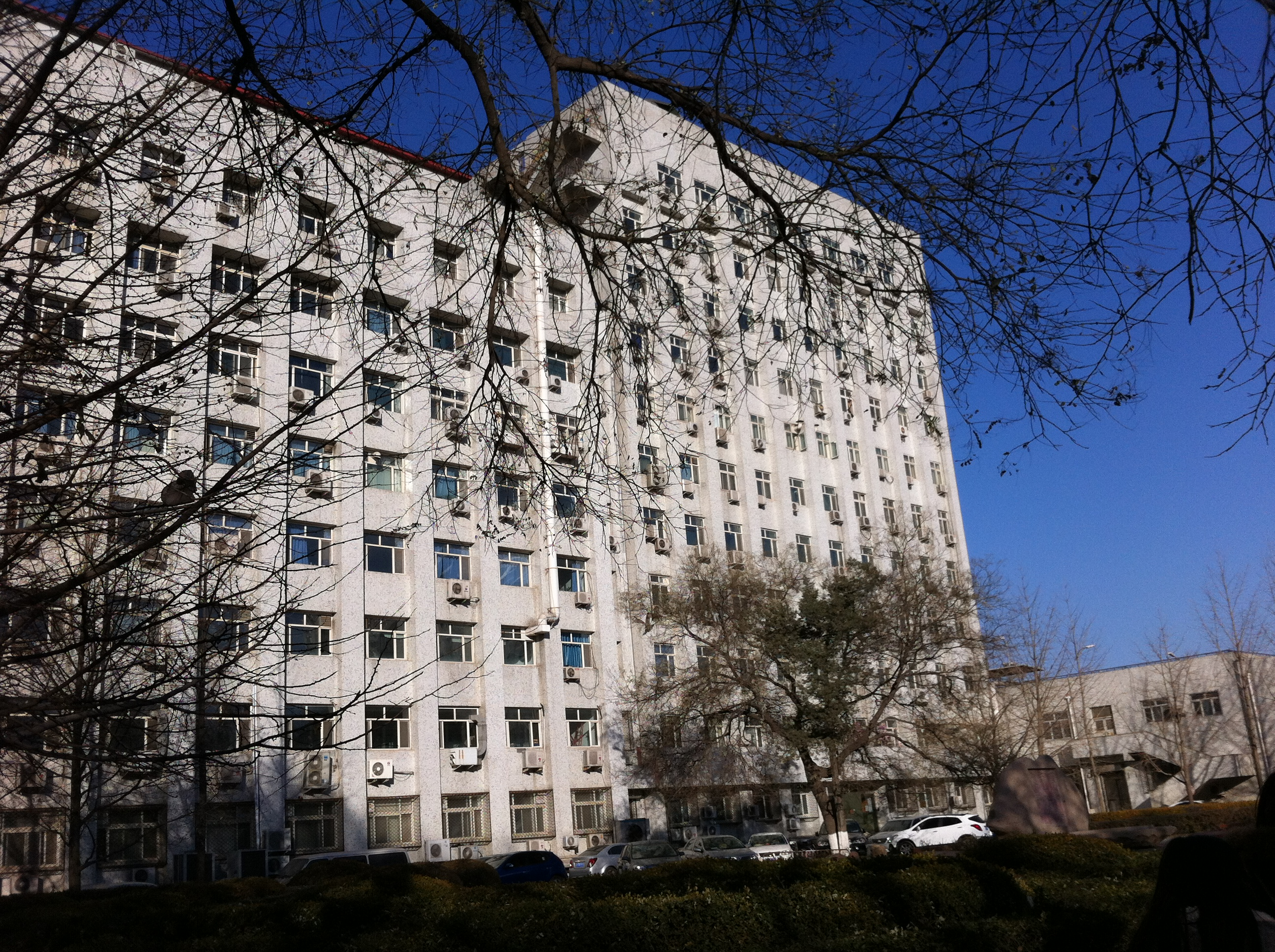
- The laboratory building of Capital Normal University within the subdistrict, 2013

- Location within Beijing Location within China
- Coordinates: 39°55′37″N 116°16′29″E
- Country: China
- Municipality: Beijing
- District: Haidian
- Village-level Divisions: 32 communities

Area
  - Total: 6.49 km^{2} (2.51 sq mi)

Population (2020)
  - Total: 133,400
  - Density: 20,600/km^{2} (53,200/sq mi)
- Time zone: UTC+8 (China Standard)
- Postal code: 100048
- Area code: 010

Balizhuang Subdistrict (Chinese: 八里庄街道; pinyin: Bālǐzhuāng Jiēdào) is a subdistrict on the south of Haidian District, Beijing, China. It borders Shuguang and Zizhuyuan Subdistricts in its north, Ganjiakou Subdistrict in its east, Wanshou Road Subdistrict in its south, and Tiancun Road Subdistrict in its west. In 2020 it had a total population of 133,400. The subdistrict was created in 1963.

== Administrative Divisions ==
In 2021, Balizhuang Subdistrict consisted of 32 communities:

Administrative division code	Subdivision names	Name transliteration
110108005001	核二院	He'eryuan
110108005002	核情报所	Heqingbaosuo
110108005003	三零四医院	Sanlingsi Yiyuan
110108005004	水文	Shuiwen
110108005005	东八里	Dongbali
110108005006	首师大	Shoushida
110108005007	北洼路第三	Beiwalu Disan
110108005008	首师大北校园	Shoushida Beixiaoyuan
110108005010	北玲珑巷	Bei Linglongxiang
110108005012	中海雅园	Zhonghai Yayuan
110108005013	鼎力	Dingli
110108005014	双紫园	Shuangziyuan
110108005015	八宝庄	Babaozhuang
110108005016	肿瘤医院	Zhongliu Yiyuan
110108005018	中化	Zhonghua
110108005019	定慧东里	Dinghui Dongli
110108005022	西八里	Xibali
110108005023	八里庄北里	Balizhuang Beili
110108005025	恩济里	Enjili
110108005027	定慧北里第一	Dinghui Beili Diyi
110108005028	定慧北里第二	Dinghui Beili Di'er
110108005029	恩济庄	Enjizhuang
110108005031	永安东里	Yong'an Dongli
110108005033	徐庄	Xuzhuang
110108005034	五路	Wulu
110108005035	美丽园	Meiliyuan
110108005036	北京印象	Beijing Yinxiang
110108005037	世纪新景园	Shiji Xinjingyuan
110108005038	裕泽园	Yuzeyuan
110108005039	颐慧佳园	Yihui Jiayuan
110108005040	定慧西里	Dinghui Xili
110108005041	五福玲珑居	Wufu Linglongju

== See also ==
- List of township-level divisions of Beijing
