= Yushuzhuang station =

Beijing Subway Line 16 station

Yushuzhuang 榆树庄
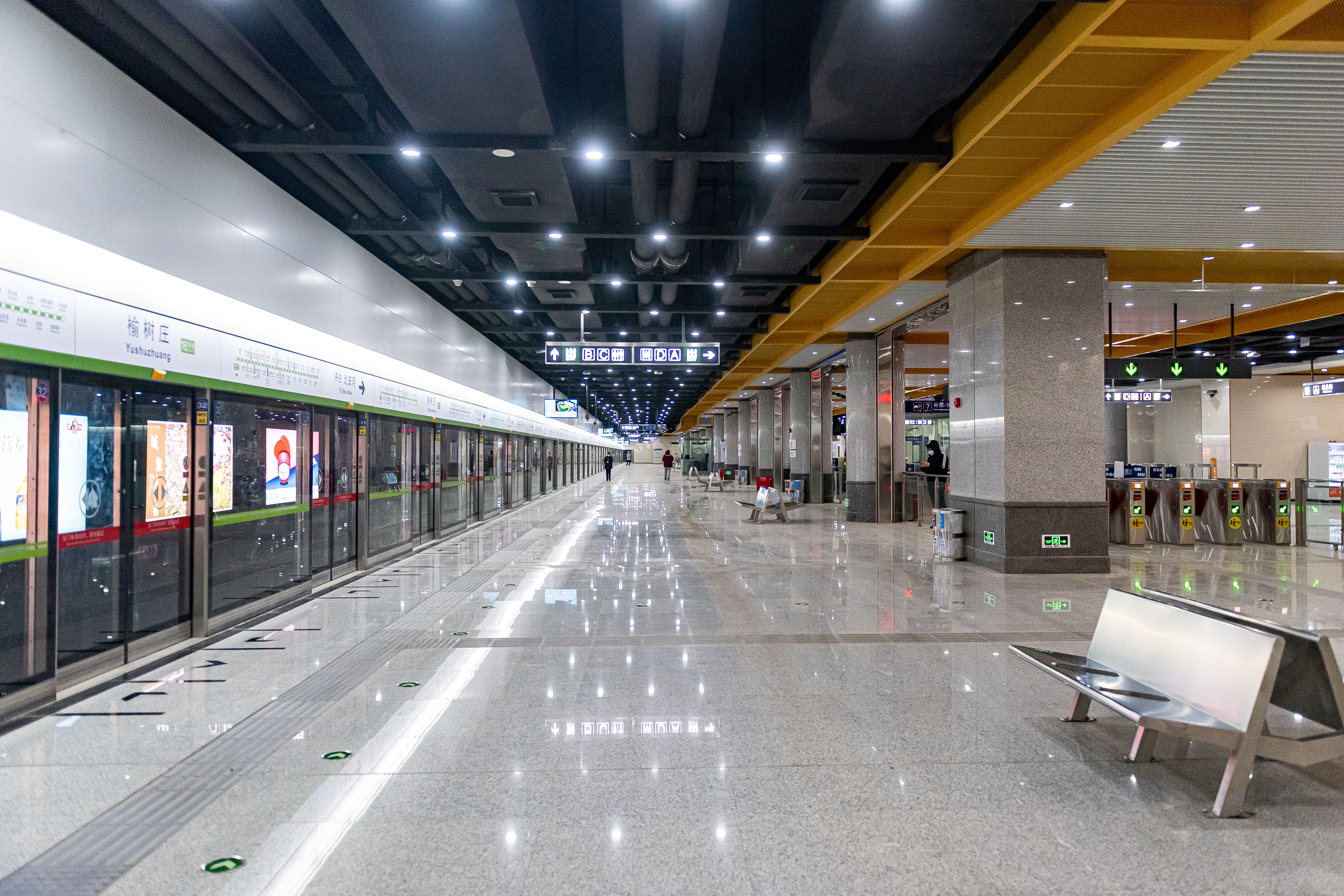

General information
- Location: Intersection of Kandan Rd. and Hongtai Rd., Fengtai District, Beijing; China
- Coordinates: 39°50′15″N 116°15′10″E
- Operator: Beijing MTR Metro Line 16 Corp., Ltd.
- Line: Line 16
- Platforms: 2 (2 side platforms)
- Tracks: 2

Construction
- Structure type: Underground
- Accessible: Yes

History
- Opened: December 31, 2022; 3 years ago

Services
Preceding station	Beijing Subway	Following station
Kandan towards Bei'anhe	Line 16	Hongtaizhuang towards Wanpingcheng
Location

Yushuzhuang station (Chinese: 榆树庄站; pinyin: Yúshùzhuāng zhàn) is a station on Line 16 of the Beijing Subway. The station opened on 31 December 2022, and was the southern terminus of the line until it extended to Wanpingcheng on 30 December 2023.

== Station layout ==
The station has 2 underground side platforms. There are 4 exits, lettered A, B, C and D. Exits B and D are accessible via elevators.
