= Suzhou Qiao station =

Beijing Subway Line 12 and Line 16 station

Suzhou Qiao 苏州桥
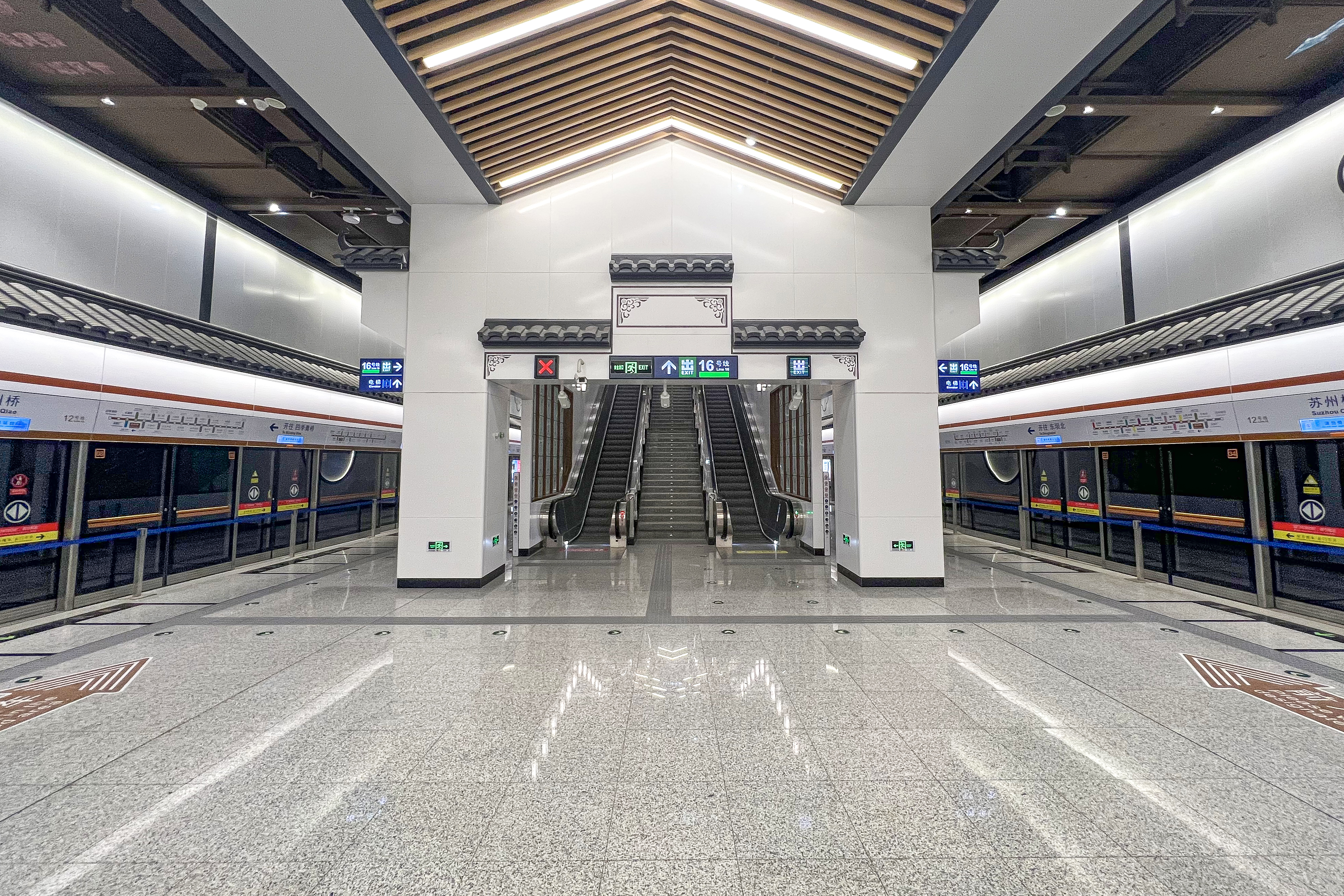
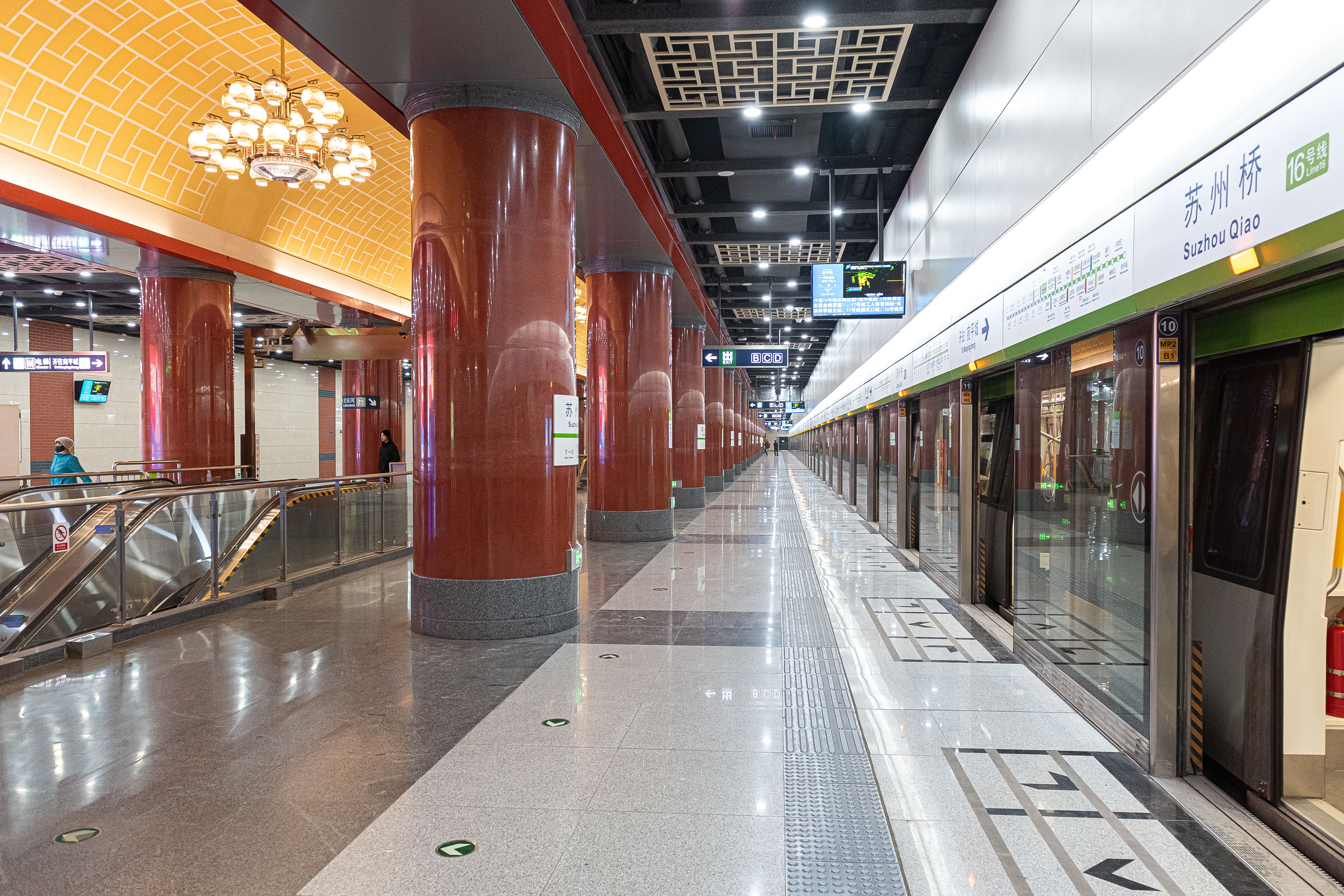
- Line 12 platform Line 16 southbound platform

General information
- Location: Suzhou Bridge (苏州桥); Intersection of West 3rd Ring Rd. (N) and Changchunqiao Rd., Haidian District, Beijing; China
- Coordinates: 39°57′37″N 116°18′06″E
- Operator: Beijing Mass Transit Railway Operation Corporation Limited; Beijing MTR Metro Line 16 Corp., Ltd.
- Lines: Line 12; Line 16
- Platforms: 4 (2 side platforms and 1 island platform)
- Tracks: 4

Construction
- Structure type: Underground
- Accessible: Yes

History
- Opened: Line 16: December 31, 2020; 5 years ago; Line 12: December 15, 2024; 20 months ago

Services
Preceding station	Beijing Subway	Following station
Changchun Qiao towards Sijiqing Qiao	Line 12	Renmin Univ. towards Dongbabei
Suzhou Jie towards Bei'anhe	Line 16	Wanshou Si towards Wanpingcheng
Location
- Location within Beijing

Suzhou Qiao station (Chinese: 苏州桥站; pinyin: Sūzhōu Qiáo zhàn) is an interchange station between lines 12 and 16 of the Beijing Subway.

== History ==
Construction of the Line 16 station started on May 18, 2014, and construction of the Line 12 station started on December 28, 2015. The Line 16 section opened on December 31, 2020, and the Line 12 station opened on December 15, 2024.

== Station layout ==
The line 12 station has an underground island platform. Due to limited space, the Line 16 station utilizes a stacked platform configuration, similar to Qilizhuang station. The upper level platform serves southbound trains, and the lower level platform serves northbound trains.

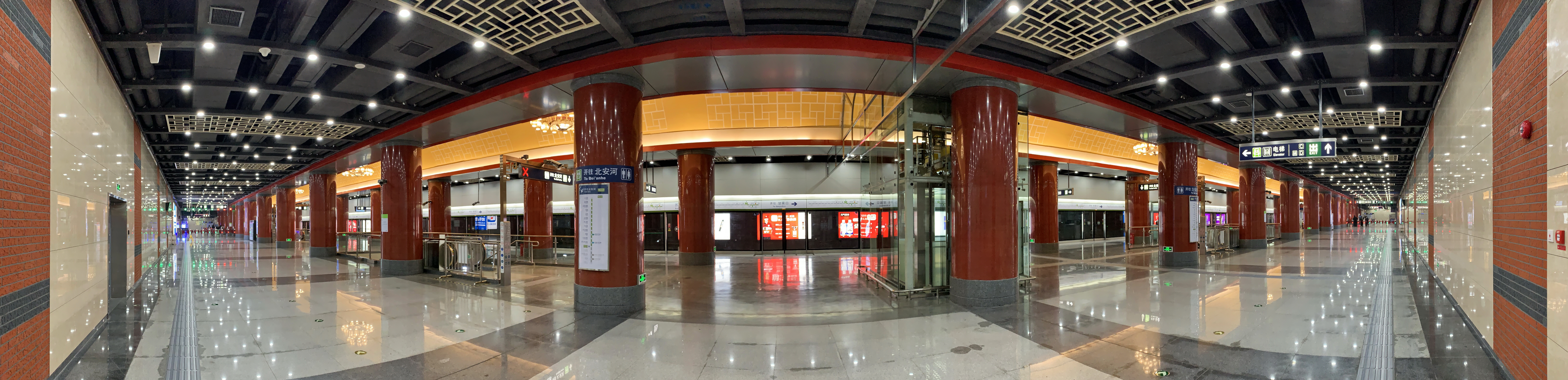
Southbound platform panorama of L16 Suzhou Qiao Station
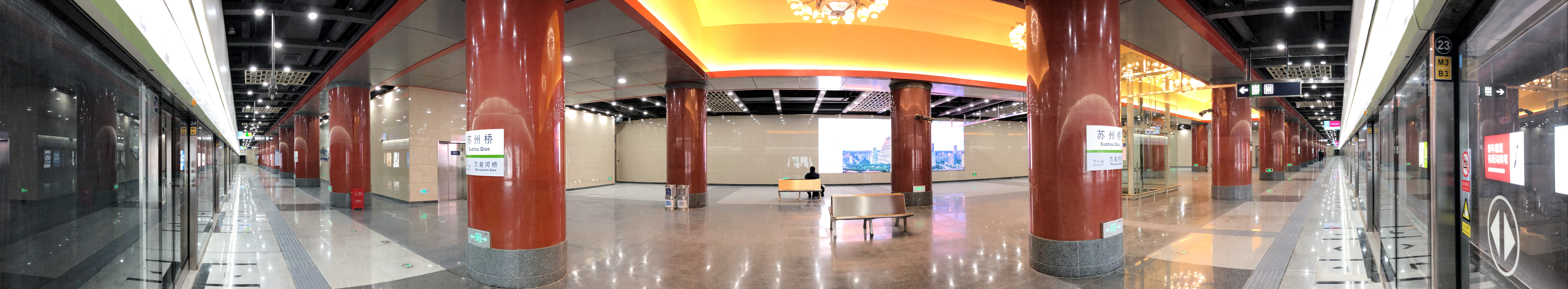
Northbound platform panorama of L16 Suzhou Qiao Station

== Gallery ==
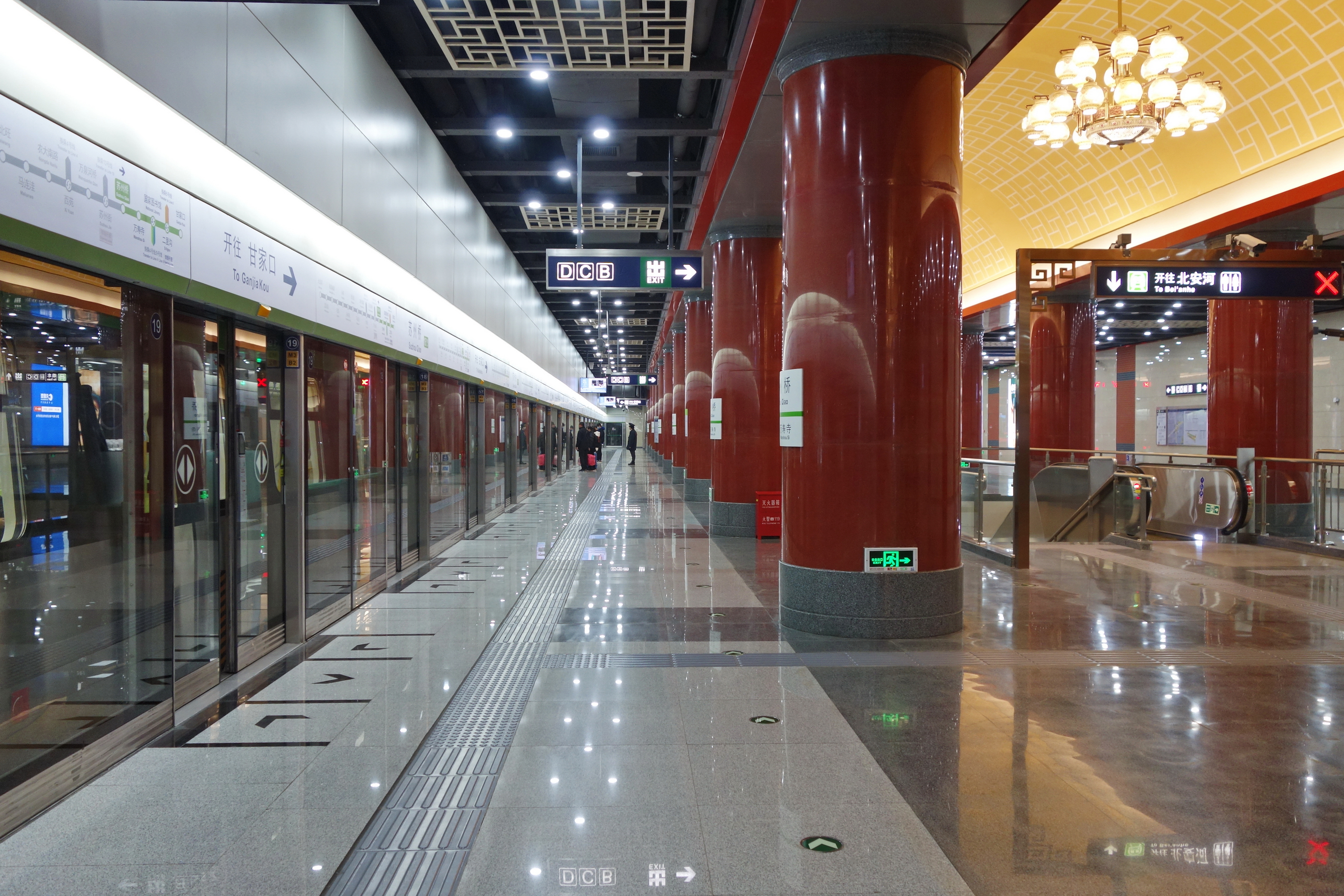
Line 16 southbound platform

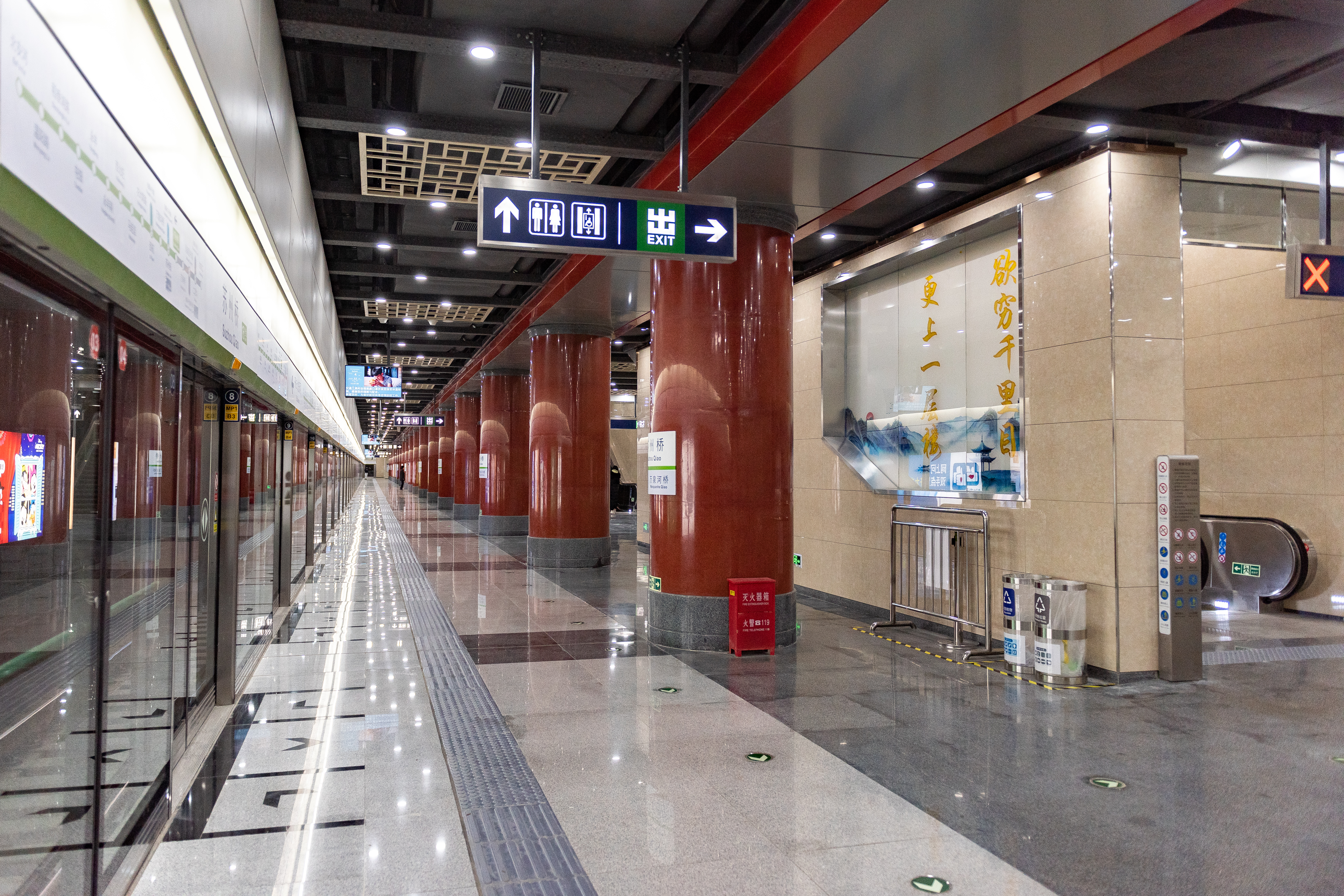
Line 16 northbound platform

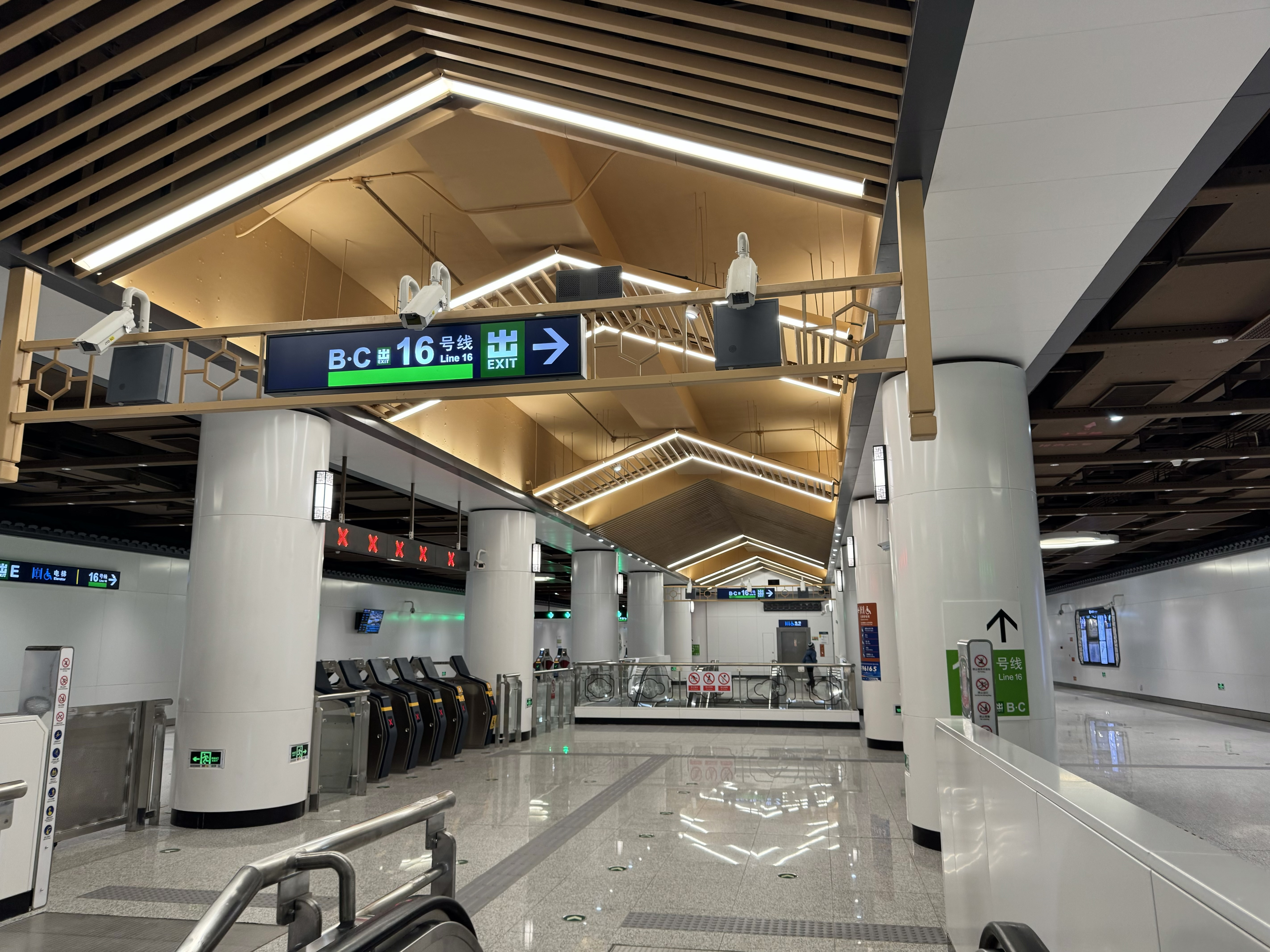
Line 12 concourse

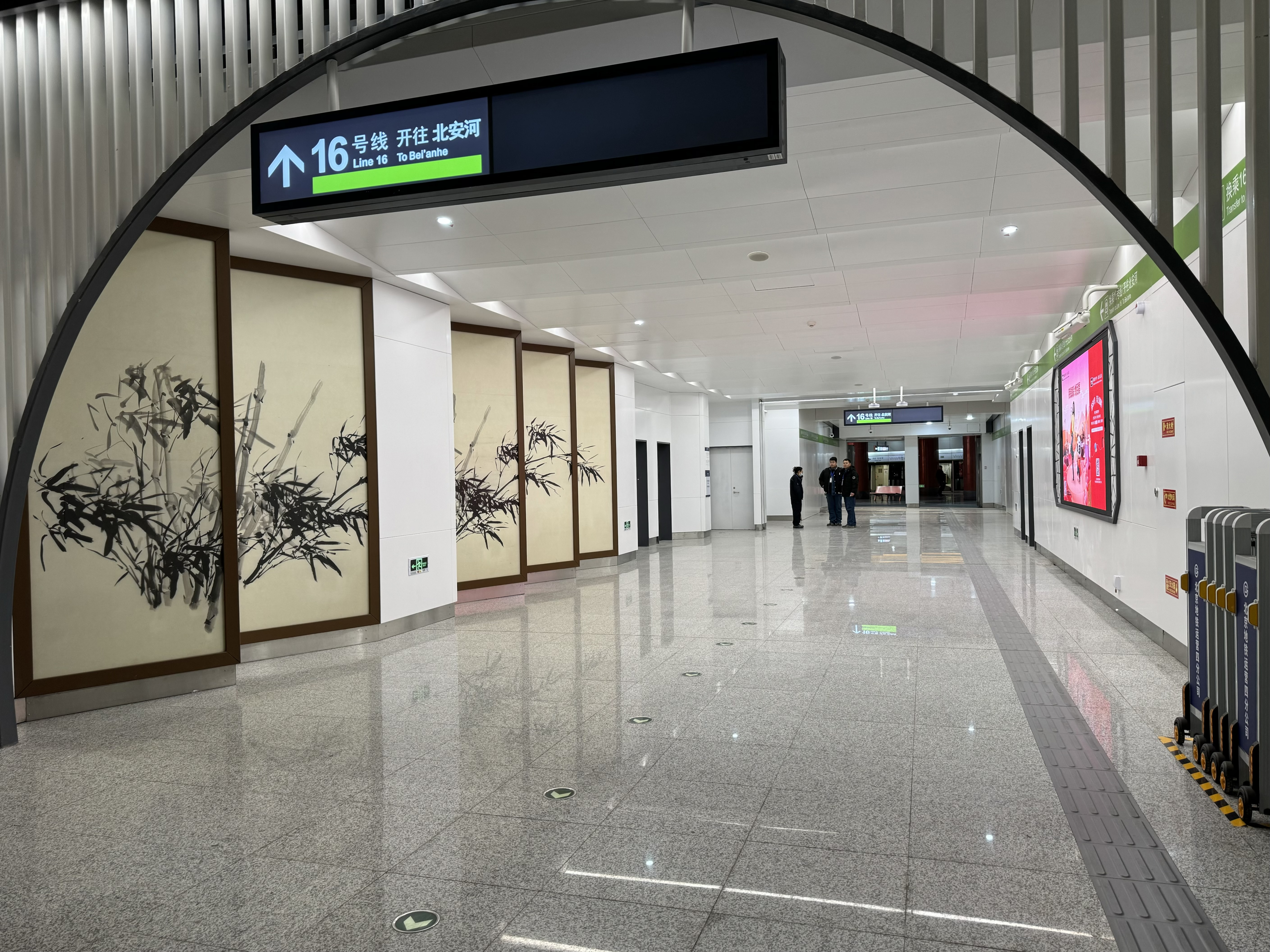
Interchange passage from Line 12's concourse to Line 16's Northbound platform
