= Suzhou Jie station =

Beijing Subway Line 10 and Line 16 station

Suzhou Jie 苏州街
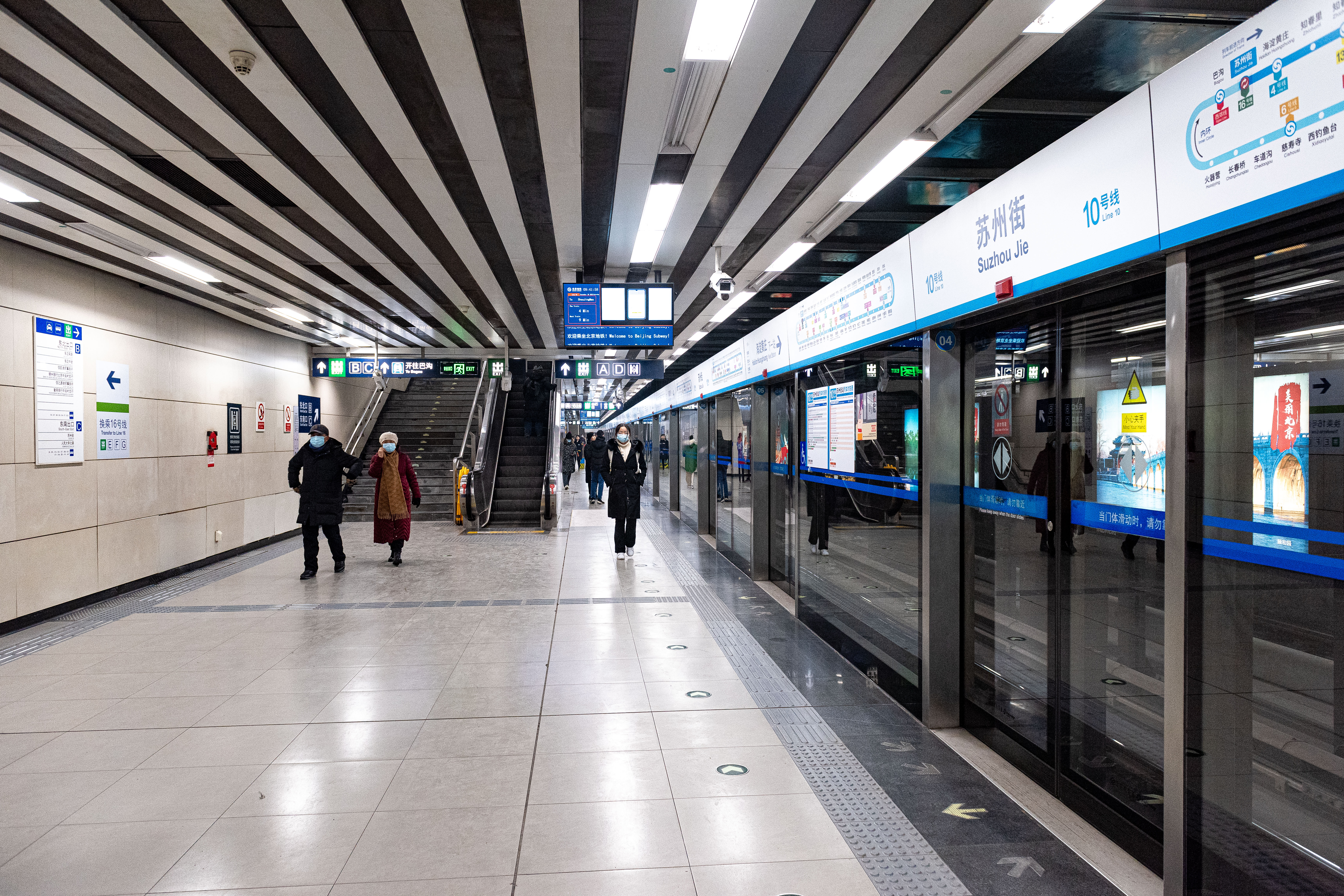
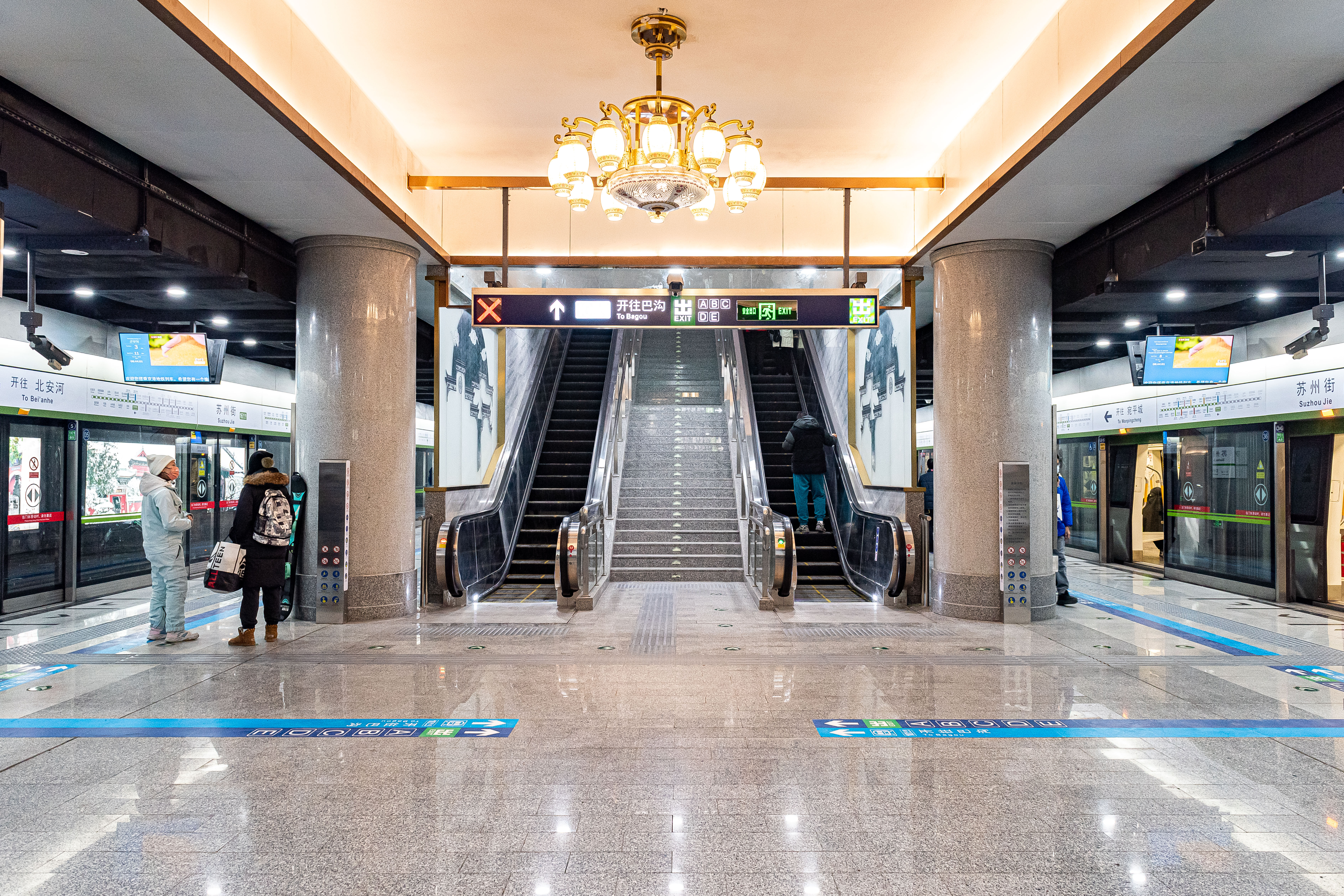
- Line 10 clockwise platform Line 16 platform

General information
- Location: Haidian South Road and Suzhou Street; Haidian Subdistrict, Haidian District, Beijing; China
- Coordinates: 39.975642°N 116.306332°E
- Operator: Beijing Mass Transit Railway Operation Corporation Limited (Line 10); Beijing MTR (Line 16)
- Lines: Line 10; Line 16
- Platforms: 4 (2 side platforms and 1 island platform)
- Tracks: 4

Construction
- Structure type: Underground
- Accessible: Yes

History
- Opened: Line 10: July 19, 2008; 18 years ago; Line 16: December 30, 2023; 2 years ago

Services
| Preceding station | Beijing Subway | Following station |
|---|---|---|
| Bagou outer loop / anticlockwise | Line 10 | Haidian Huangzhuang inner loop / clockwise |
| Wanquanhe Qiao towards Bei'anhe | Line 16 | Suzhou Qiao towards Wanpingcheng |
Location
- Location within Beijing

Suzhou Jie station (simplified Chinese: 苏州街站; traditional Chinese: 蘇州街站; pinyin: Sūzhōujiē zhàn; lit. 'Suzhou Street station') is a subway station on Line 10 and Line 16 of the Beijing Subway. Line 10 opened on 19 July 2008. Line 16 opened on 30 December 2023.

== Station layout ==
The line 10 station has 2 underground side platforms. The line 16 station has an underground island platform.

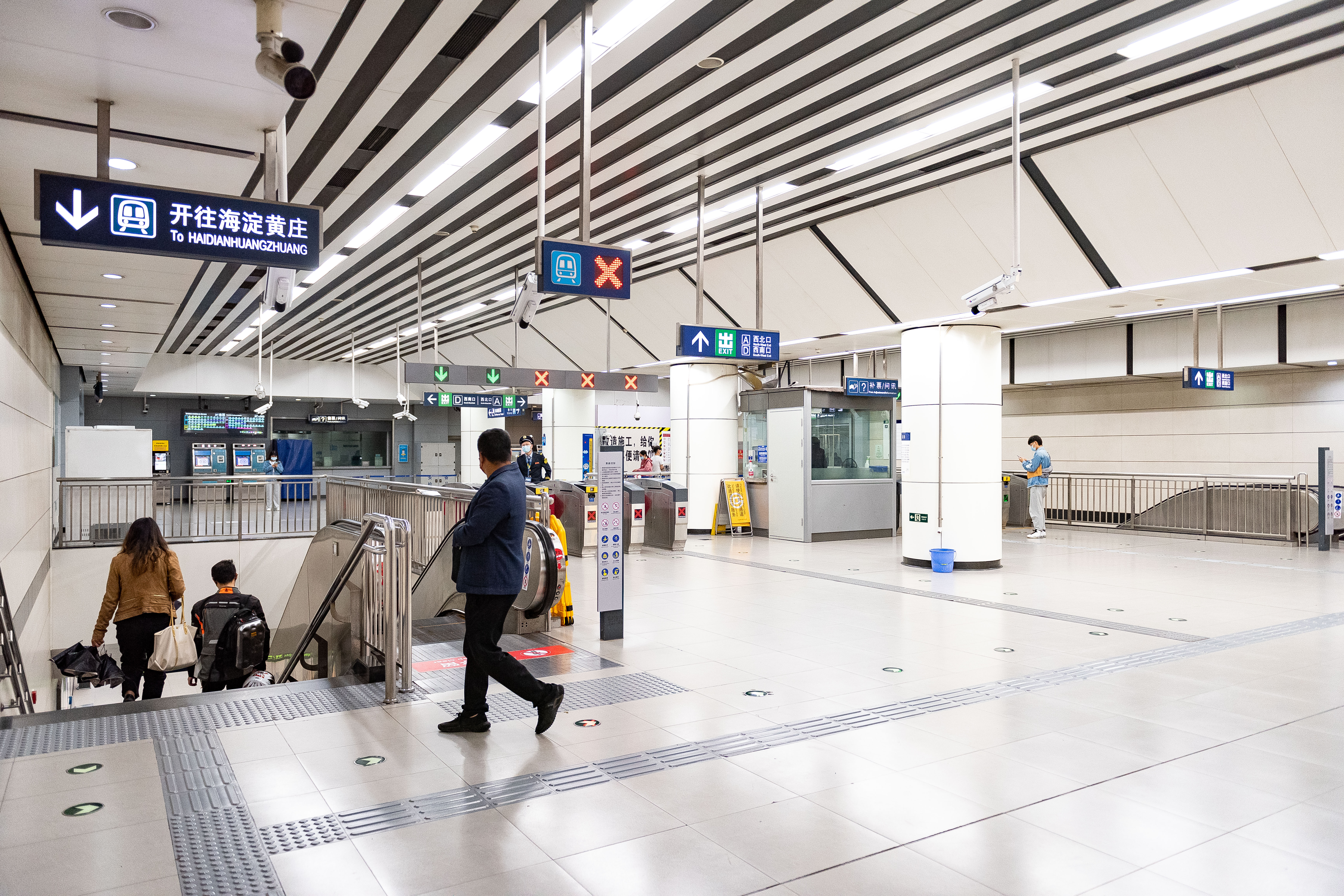
Line 10 west concourse

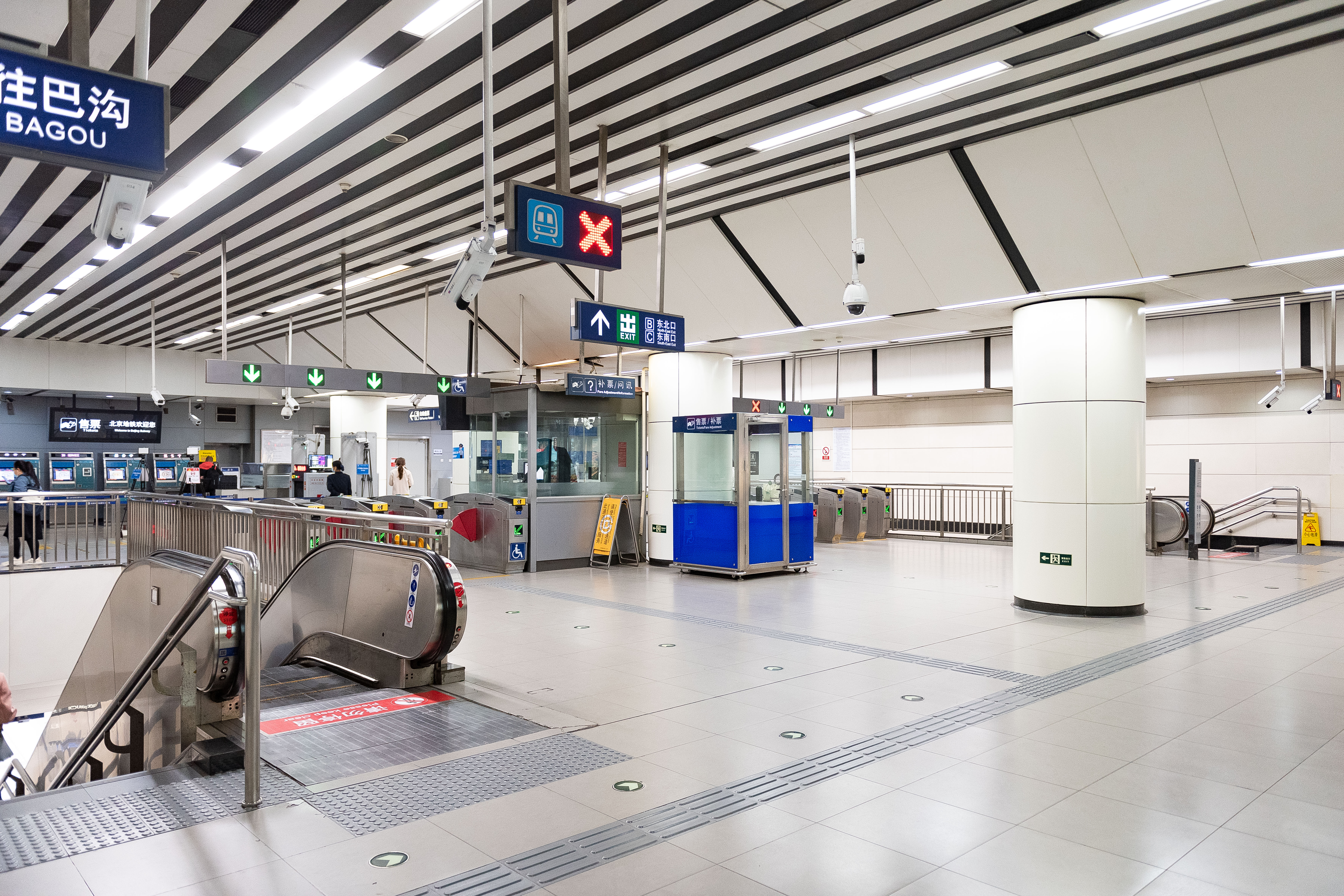
Line 10 east concourse

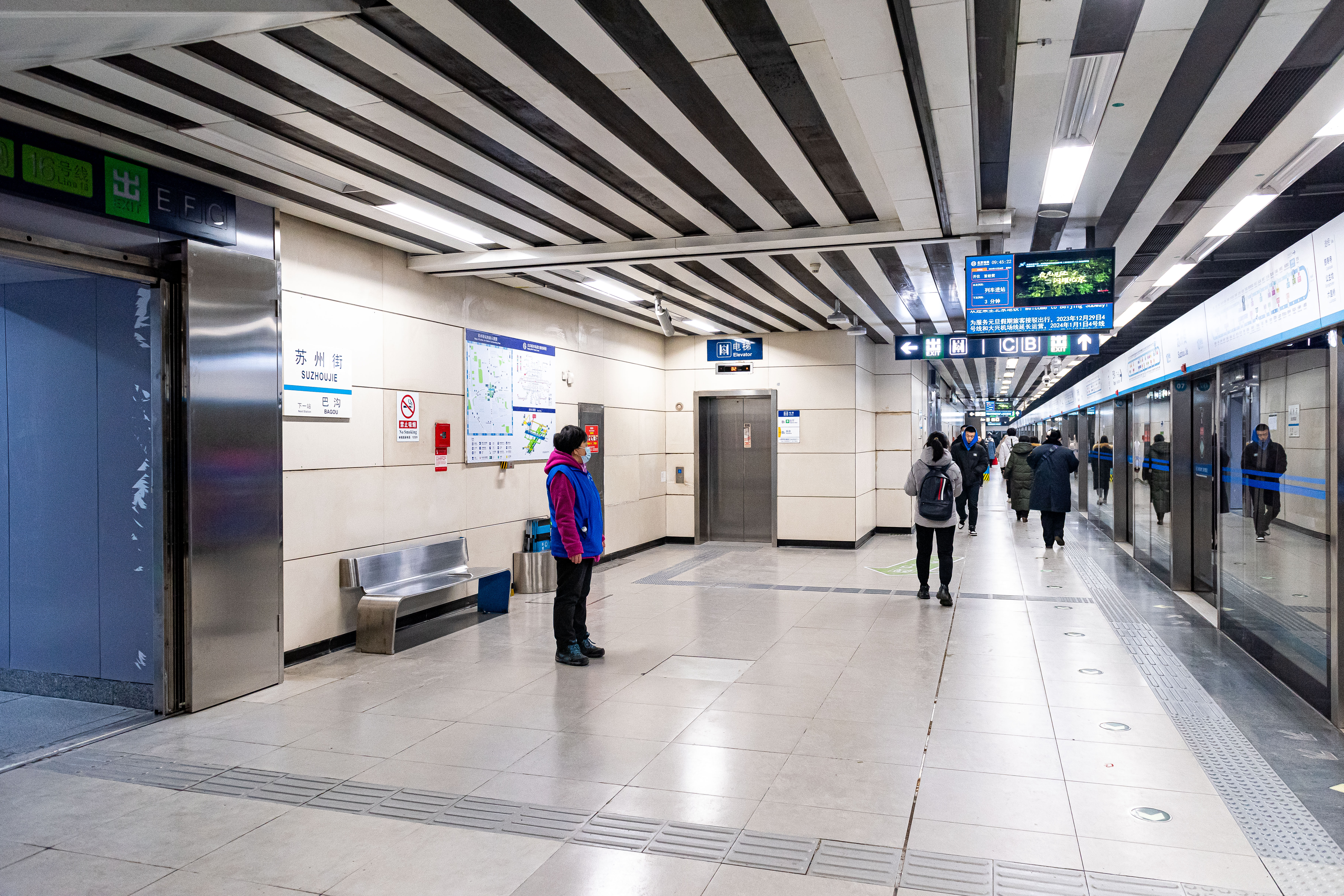
Line 10 counter-clockwise platform

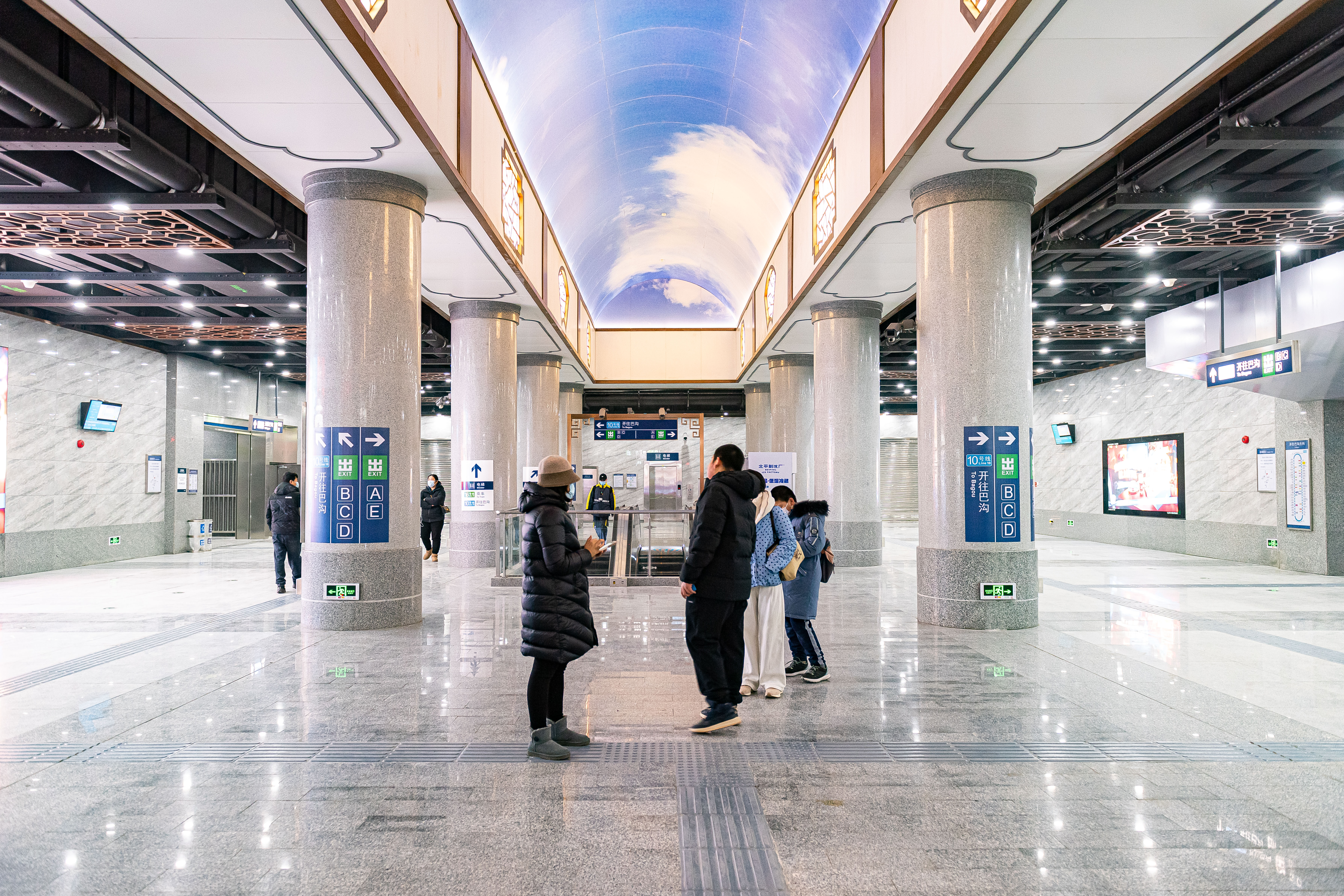
Line 16 north concourse

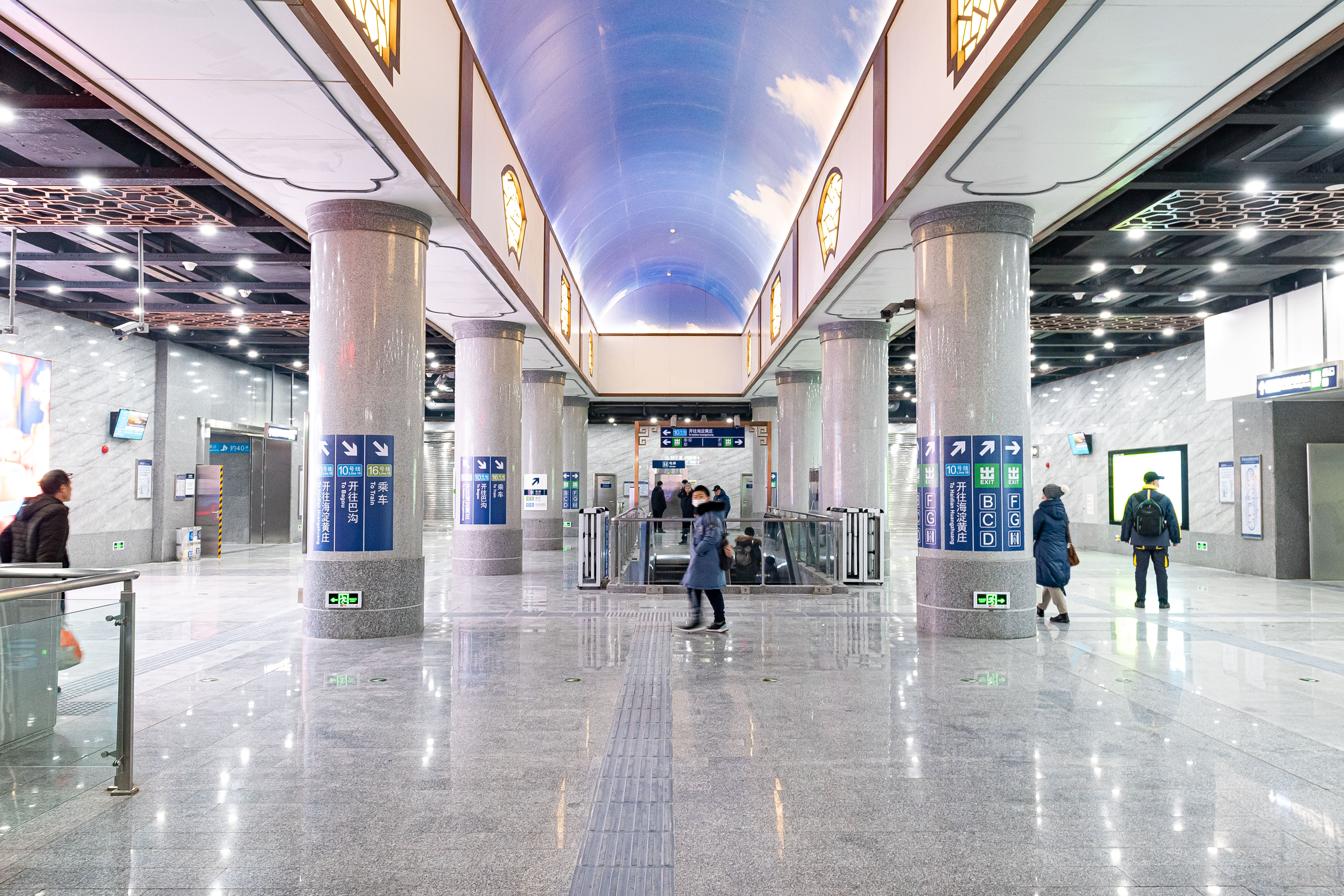
Line 16 south concourse

== Exits ==
There are 7 exits, lettered A, B, C, D, E, F and G. Exits A and F are accessible.
