= Nongda Nanlu station =

Beijing Subway station

Nongda Nanlu 农大南路
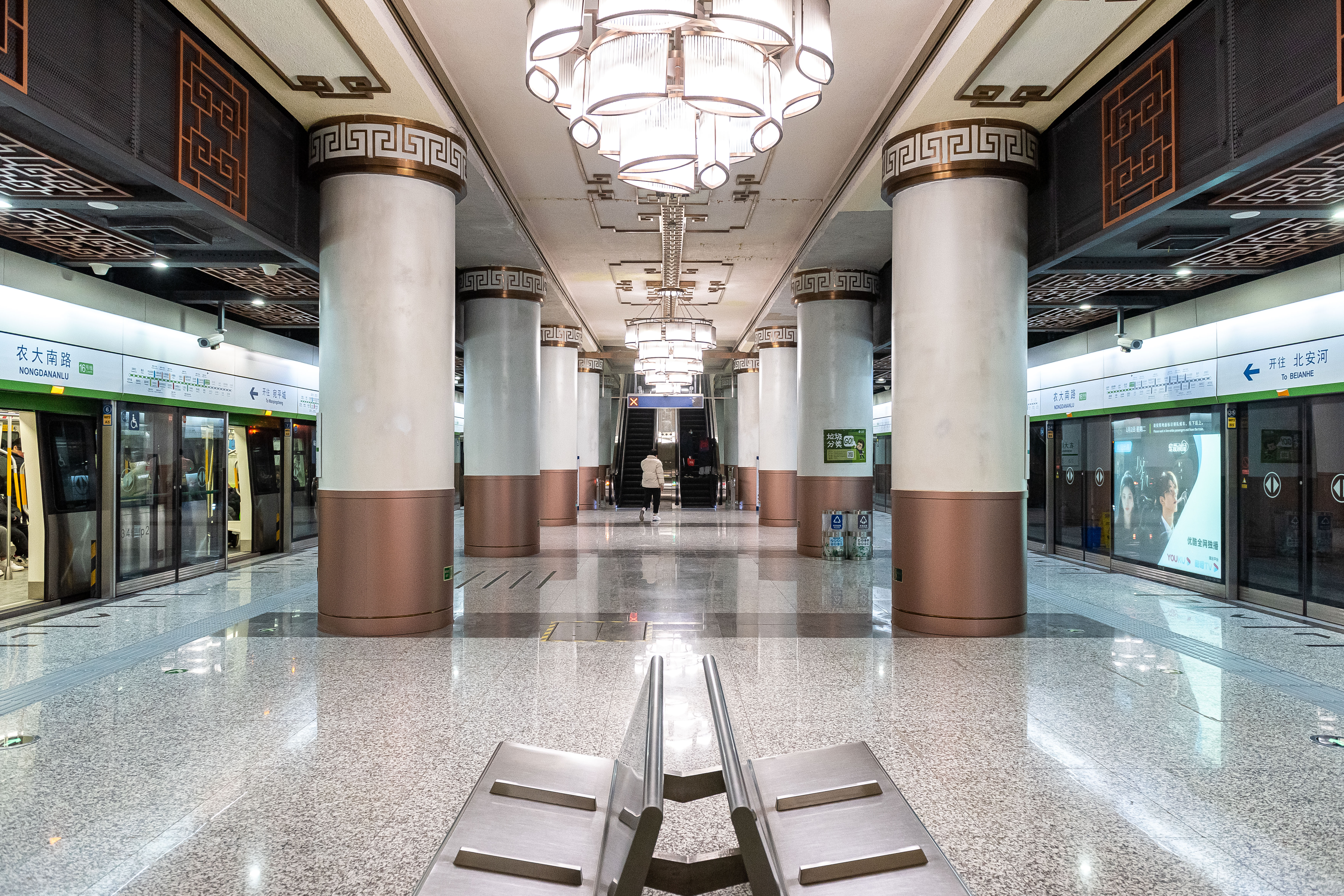
- Platform in January 2024

General information
- Location: Yuanmingyuan West Road (圆明园西路) and Tianxiu Road (天秀路)/Nongda South Road (农大南路); Haidian District, Beijing; China
- Coordinates: 40°01′17″N 116°16′56″E
- Operator: Beijing MTR Metro Line 16 Corp., Ltd.
- Line: Line 16
- Platforms: 2 (1 island platform)
- Tracks: 2

Construction
- Structure type: Underground
- Accessible: Yes

History
- Opened: December 30, 2017

Services
Preceding station	Beijing Subway	Following station
Malianwa towards Bei'anhe	Line 16	Xiyuan towards Wanpingcheng
Location
- Location within Beijing

Nongda Nanlu station (simplified Chinese: 农大南路站; traditional Chinese: 農大南路站; pinyin: Nóngdà Nánlù Zhàn; lit. 'Nongda (Agricultural University) South Road station') is a station on the Line 16 of the Beijing Subway, located southwest of the west campus of China Agricultural University. It was opened on 30 December 2017.

== Station layout ==
The station has an underground island platform.

== Exits ==
There are 4 exits, lettered A, B, C, and D. Exit D is accessible.
