= Hongtaizhuang station =

Beijing Subway Line 16 station

Hongtaizhuang 洪泰庄
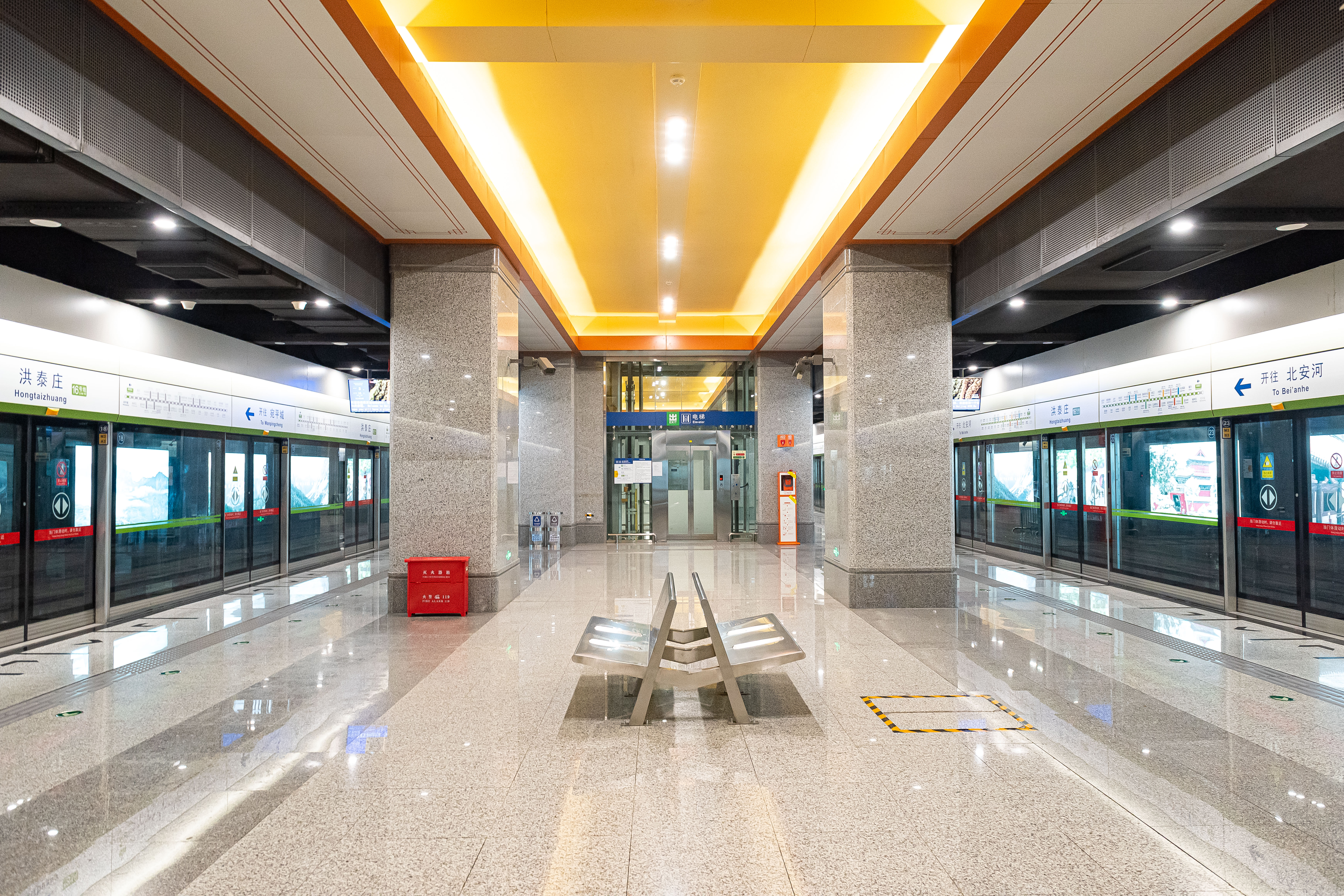
- Platform

General information
- Location: Intersection of Fengyu Road (丰裕路) and Liuzhuangzi Road (刘庄子路), Hongtaizhuang Village, Fengtai District, Beijing; China
- Coordinates: 39°50′46″N 116°14′36″E
- Operator: Beijing MTR Metro Line 16 Corp., Ltd.
- Line: Line 16
- Platforms: 2 (1 island platform)
- Tracks: 2

Construction
- Structure type: Underground
- Accessible: Yes

History
- Opened: December 30, 2023; 2 years ago

Services
Preceding station	Beijing Subway	Following station
Yushuzhuang towards Bei'anhe	Line 16	Wanpingcheng Terminus
Location

Hongtaizhuang station (Chinese: 洪泰庄站; pinyin: Hóngtàizhuāng zhàn) is a station on Line 16 of the Beijing Subway. It opened on December 30, 2023.

== History ==
In April 2020, the Beijing Municipal Commission of Development and Reform decided to build Yushuzhuang North station. On September 1, 2022, the station was renamed as Hongtaizhuang station. On November 1, 2022, the station was officially named as Hongtaizhuang.

== Station layout ==
The station has an underground island platform. There are 2 exits, lettered A and D. Both exits lead to Liuzhuangzi Road. Exit A is accessible.
