= Xi Yuan station =

Beijing Subway interchange station

Xi Yuan 西苑
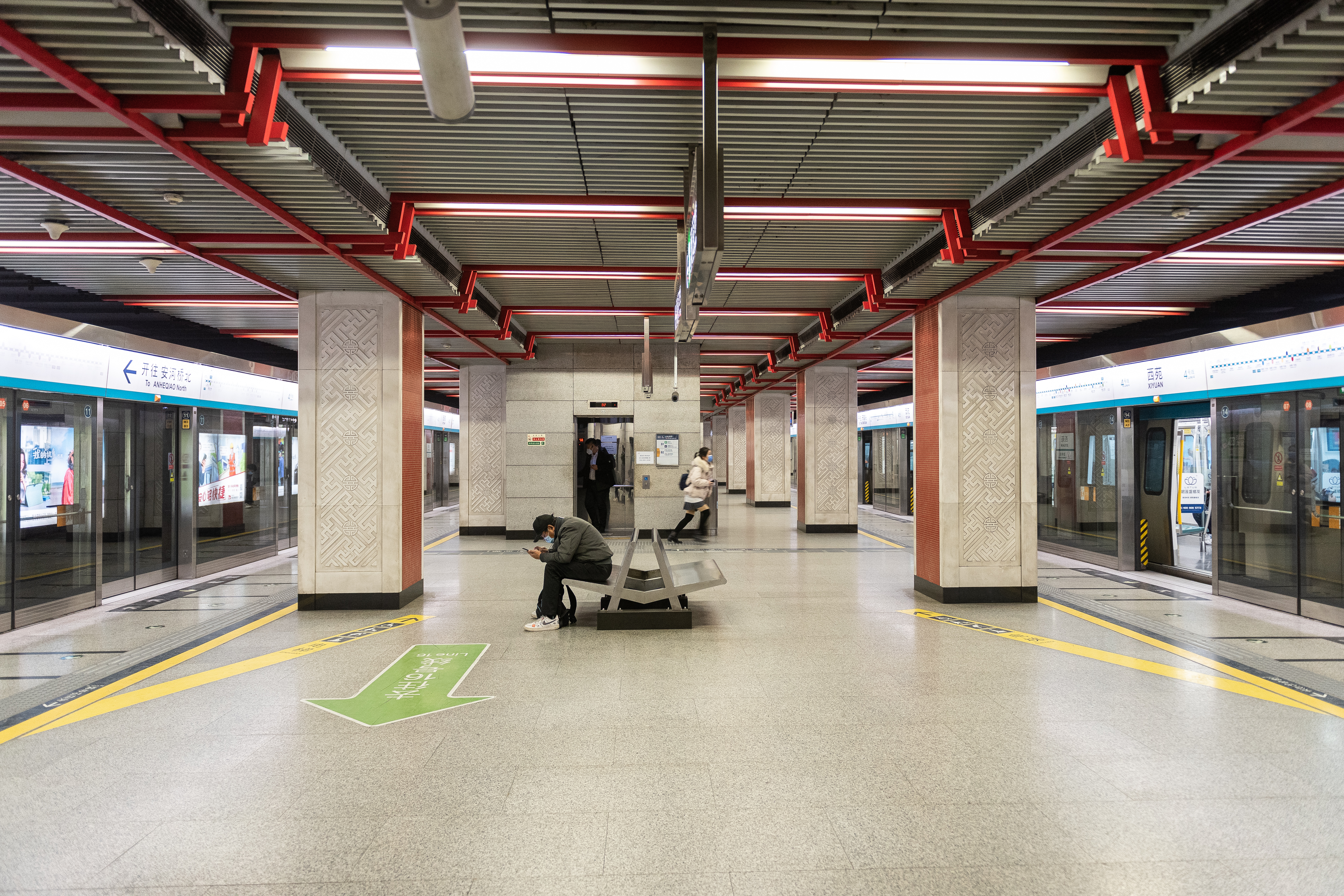
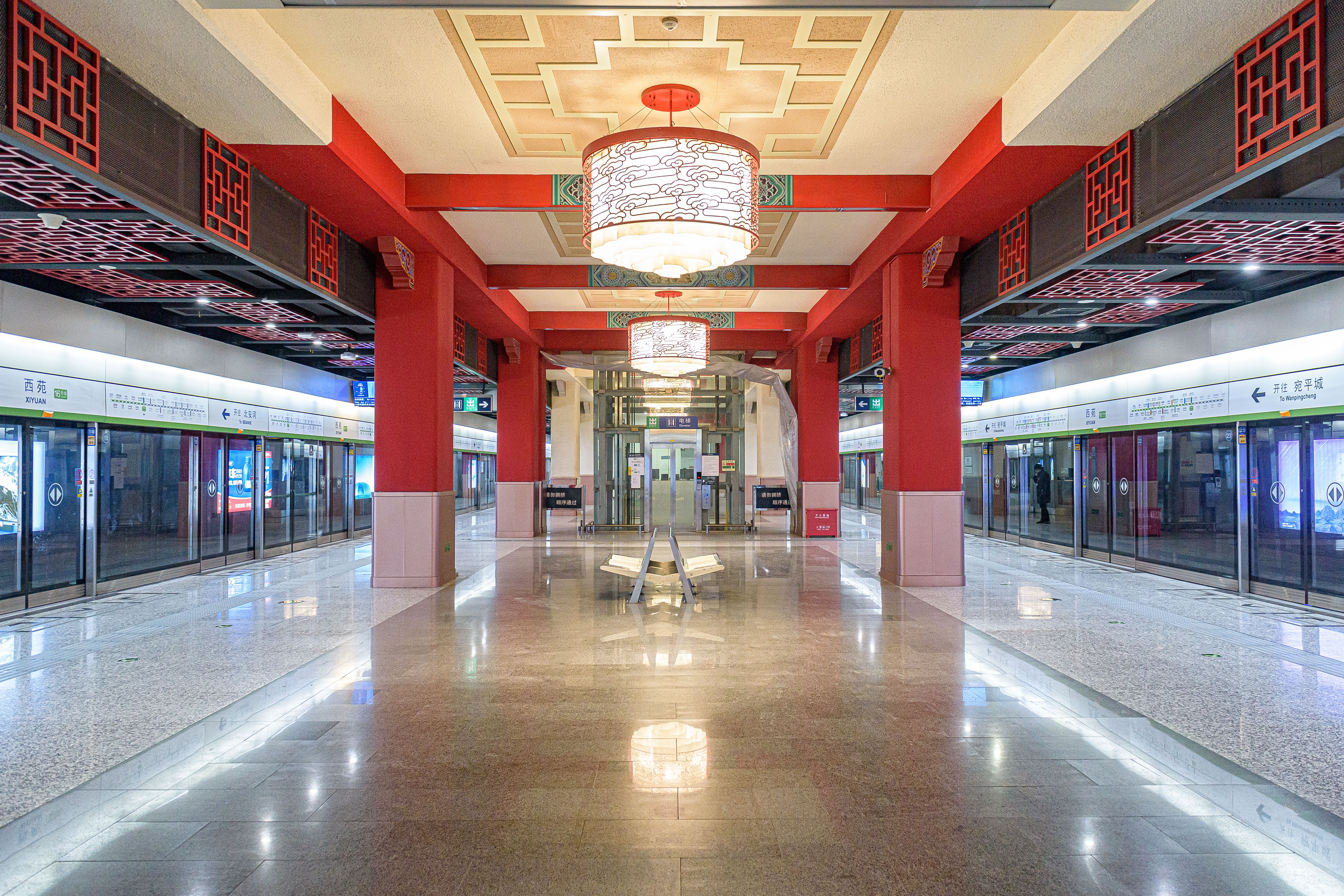
- Line 4 platform Line 16 platform

General information
- Location: Qinglongqiao Subdistrict, Haidian District, Beijing; China
- Coordinates: 39°59′49″N 116°17′05″E
- Operator: Beijing MTR Corporation Limited; Beijing MTR Metro Line 16 Corporation Limited
- Lines: Line 4 Line 16
- Platforms: 4 (2 island platforms)
- Tracks: 4

Construction
- Structure type: Underground
- Accessible: Yes

History
- Opened: September 28, 2009; 16 years ago (Line 4); December 31, 2016; 9 years ago (Line 16)
- Former names: Yiheyuan

Services
Preceding station	Beijing Subway	Following station
Beigongmen towards Anheqiaobei	Line 4	Yuanmingyuan Park towards Tiangong Yuan
Nongda Nanlu towards Bei'anhe	Line 16	Wanquanhe Qiao towards Wanpingcheng
Location
- Location within Beijing

Xi Yuan station (Chinese: 西苑站; pinyin: Xī Yuàn Zhàn) is an interchange station between Line 4 and Line 16 of the Beijing Subway. The station originally opened on September 28, 2009, along with the rest of Line 4. Line 16 was opened on December 31, 2016, and the station served as the southern terminus of Line 16 until December 31, 2020, when it was extended south to Ganjia Kou.

== Station layout ==
Both the Line 4 and Line 16 stations have underground island platforms. The lines are connected through a 120m long Y-shaped walkway, allowing transfers without leaving platform level.

There is enough space to build another platform in between the Line 4 and Line 16 platforms for a potential Line 15 westward extension.

== Exits ==
There are 5 exits, lettered A, B1, B2, C1, and C2. Exit A is accessible.

== Gallery ==
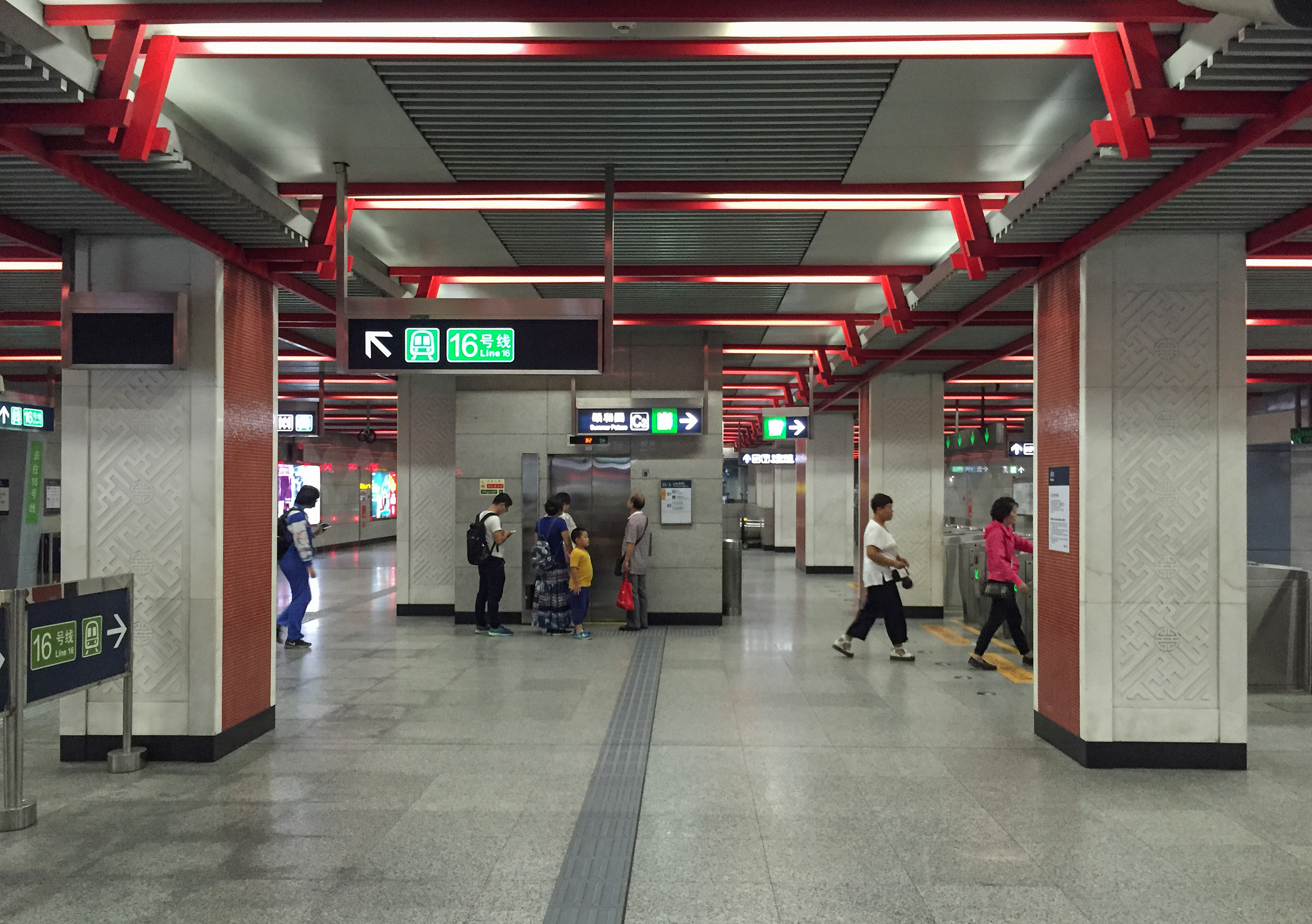
Line 4 Concourse

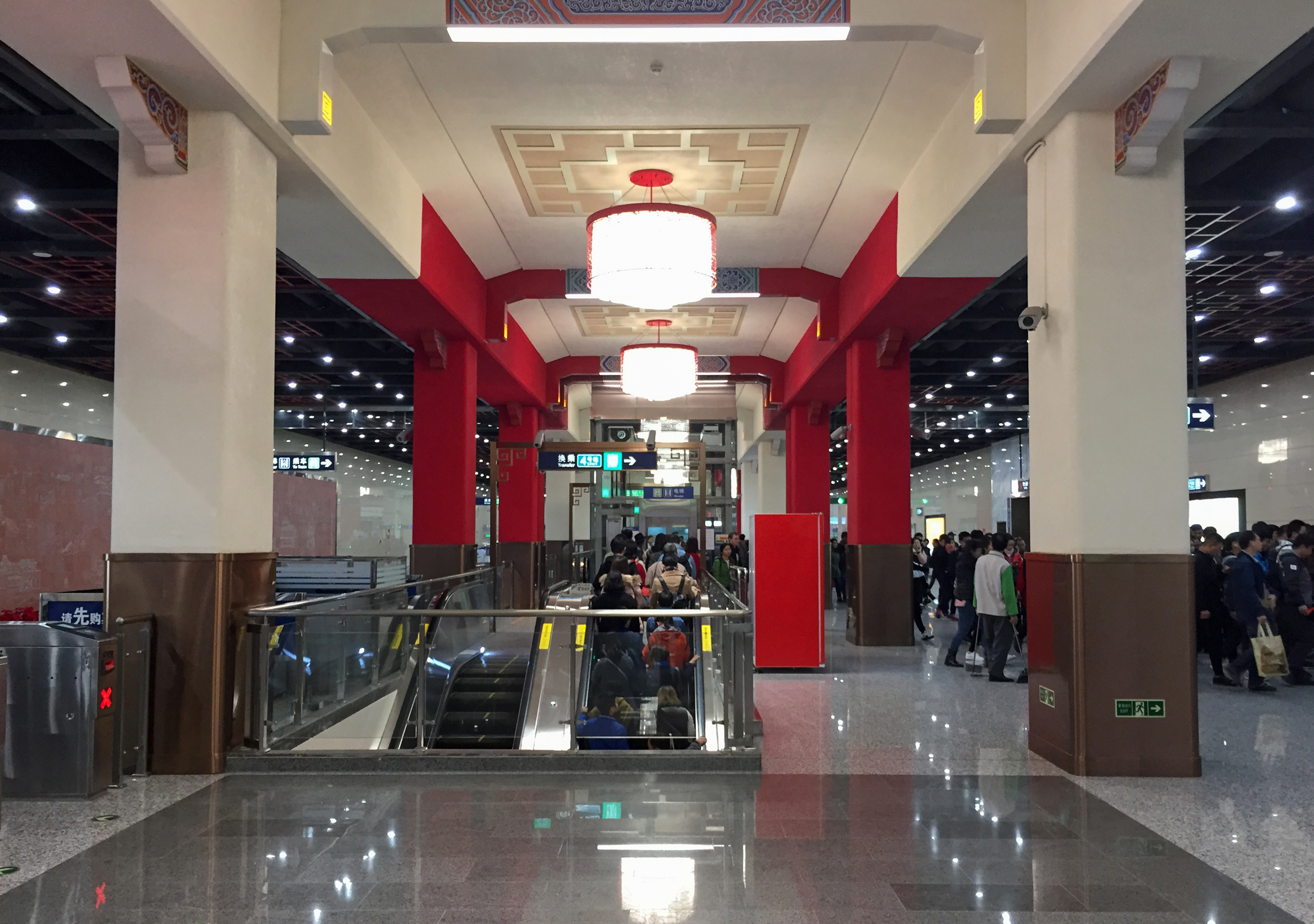
Line 16 Concourse
