= Malianwa station =

Beijing Subway Line 16 and Line 18 station

Malianwa 马连洼
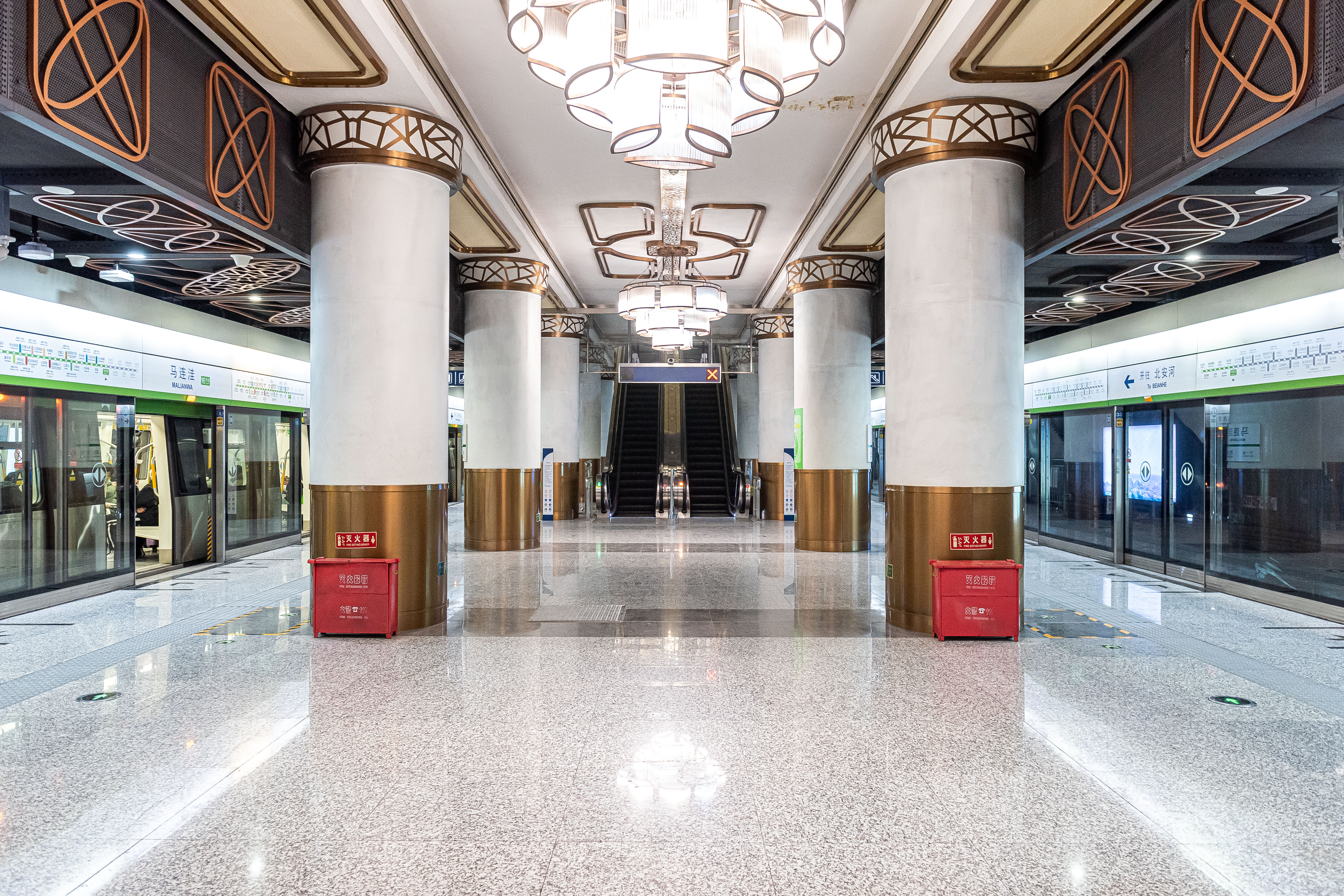
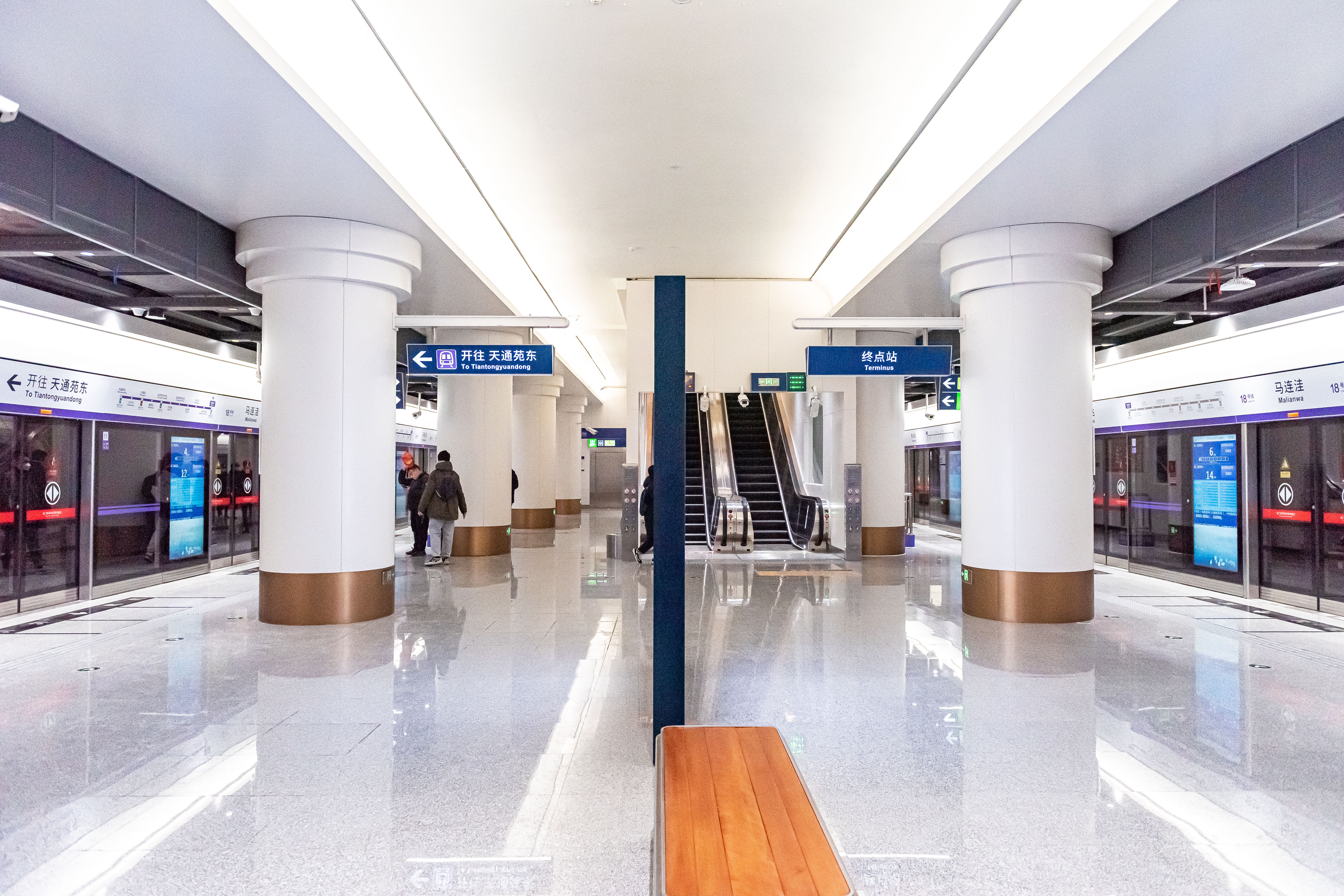
- Line 16 platform Line 18 platform

General information
- Location: Yuanmingyuan West Road (圆明园西路) and Malianwa North Road (马连洼北路); Haidian District, Beijing; China
- Coordinates: 40°01′57″N 116°16′21″E
- Operator: Beijing MTR Metro Line 16 Corp., Ltd.
- Lines: Line 16; Line 18
- Platforms: 4 (2 island platforms)
- Tracks: 4

Construction
- Structure type: Underground
- Accessible: Yes

History
- Opened: Line 16: December 31, 2016; 9 years ago; Line 18: December 27, 2025; 7 months ago

Services
Preceding station	Beijing Subway	Following station
Xibeiwang towards Bei'anhe	Line 16	Nongda Nanlu towards Wanpingcheng
Terminus	Line 18	Shangdi Software Park towards Tiantongyuandong
Location
- Location within Beijing

Malianwa station (simplified Chinese: 马连洼站; traditional Chinese: 馬連窪站; pinyin: Mǎliánwā zhàn) is an interchange station between Line 16 and Line 18 of the Beijing Subway. Line 16 opened at this station on December 31, 2016. Line 18 opened at this station on December 27, 2025, and serves as its western terminus.

== Schedule ==
As of December 2016:

Destination	First Train	Last Train
Line 16
to Bei'anhe	6:02 am	11:41 pm
to Wanpingcheng	5:34 am	10:55 pm

== Station features ==
The station has underground island platforms for both Line 16 and Line 18.

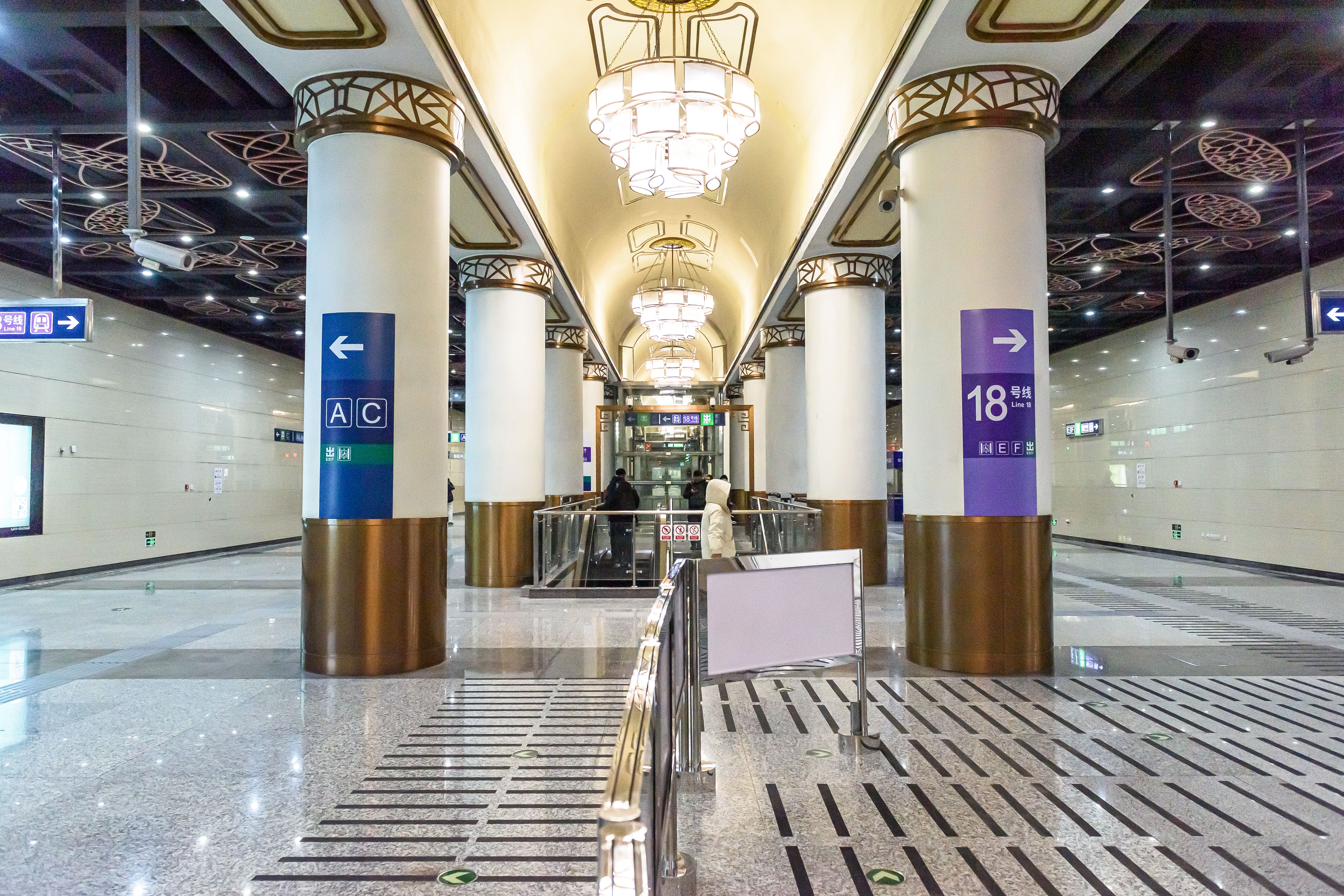
Line 16 concourse

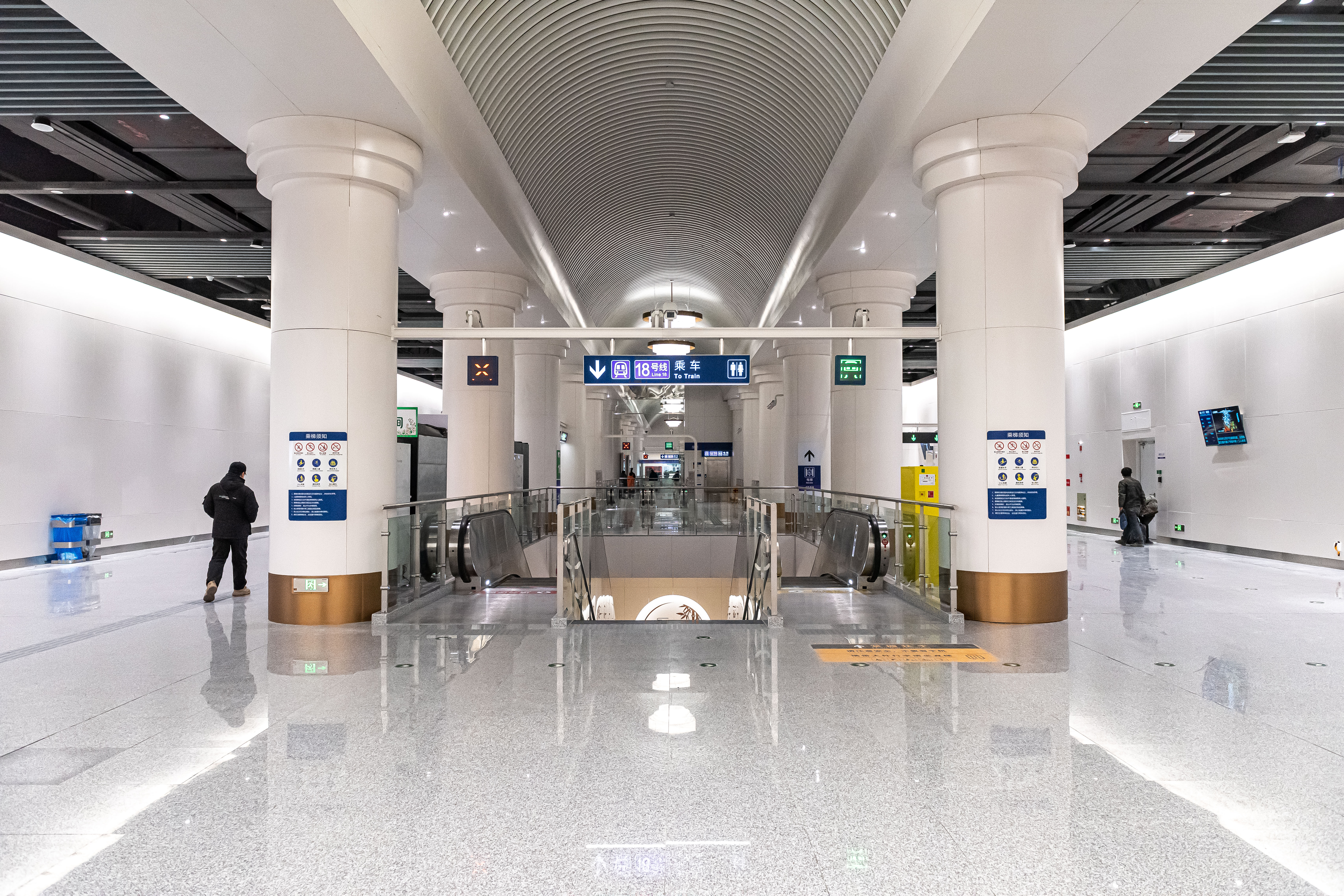
Line 18 concourse

=== Exits ===
There are 4 exits, lettered A, C, E and F. Exits A and F are accessible via elevators.

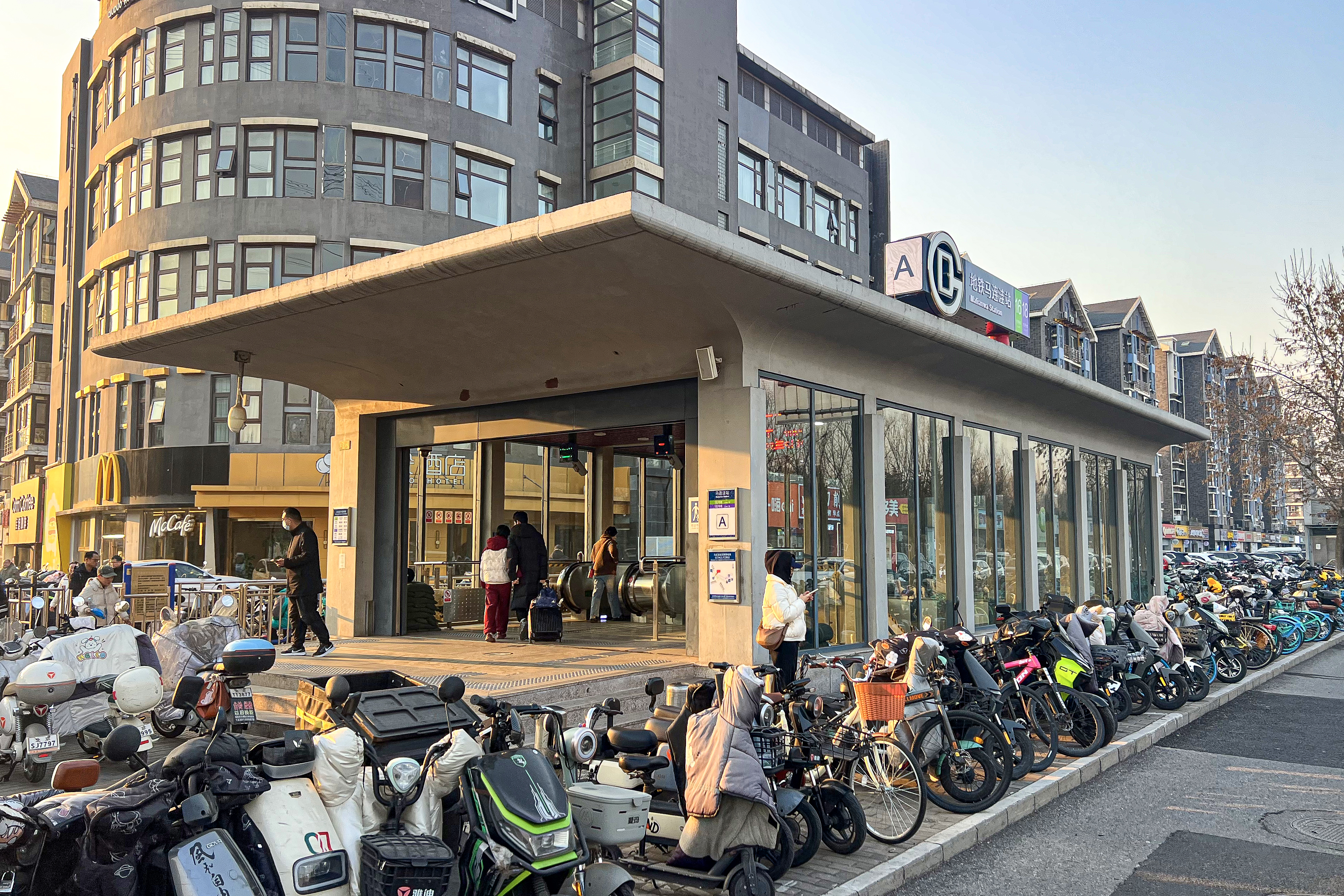
Exit A, Line 16

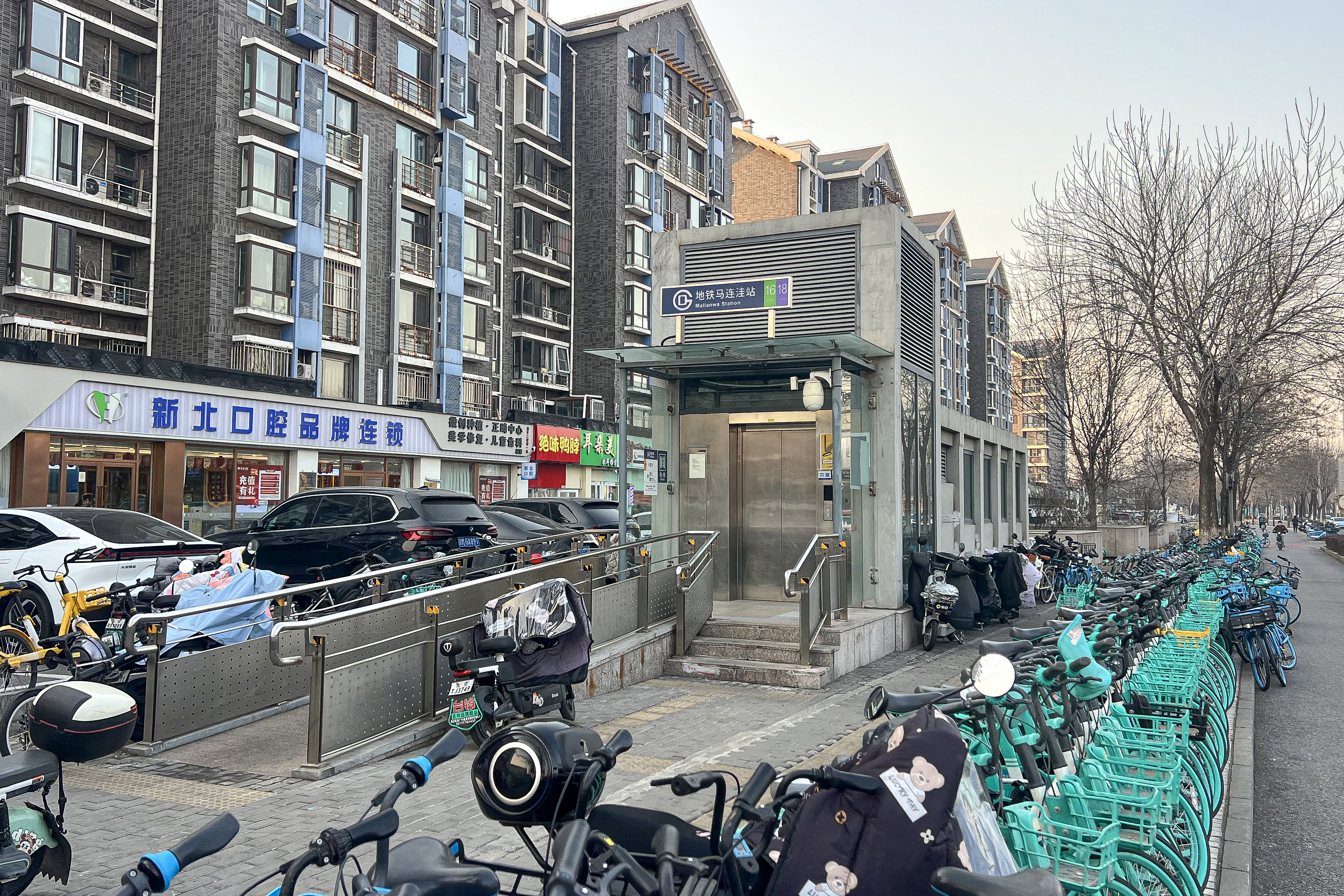
Exit A (elevator exit)

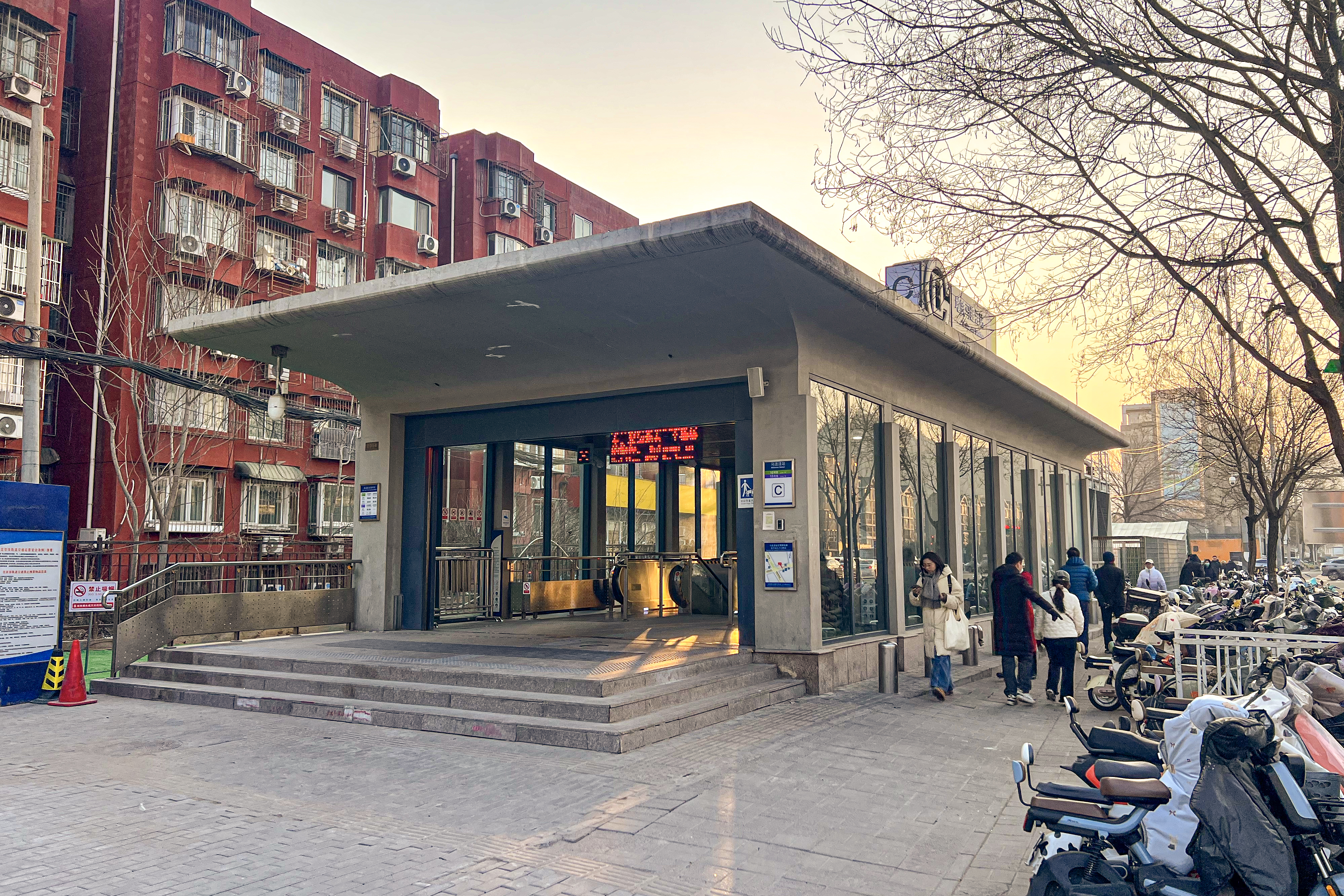
Exit C, Line 16

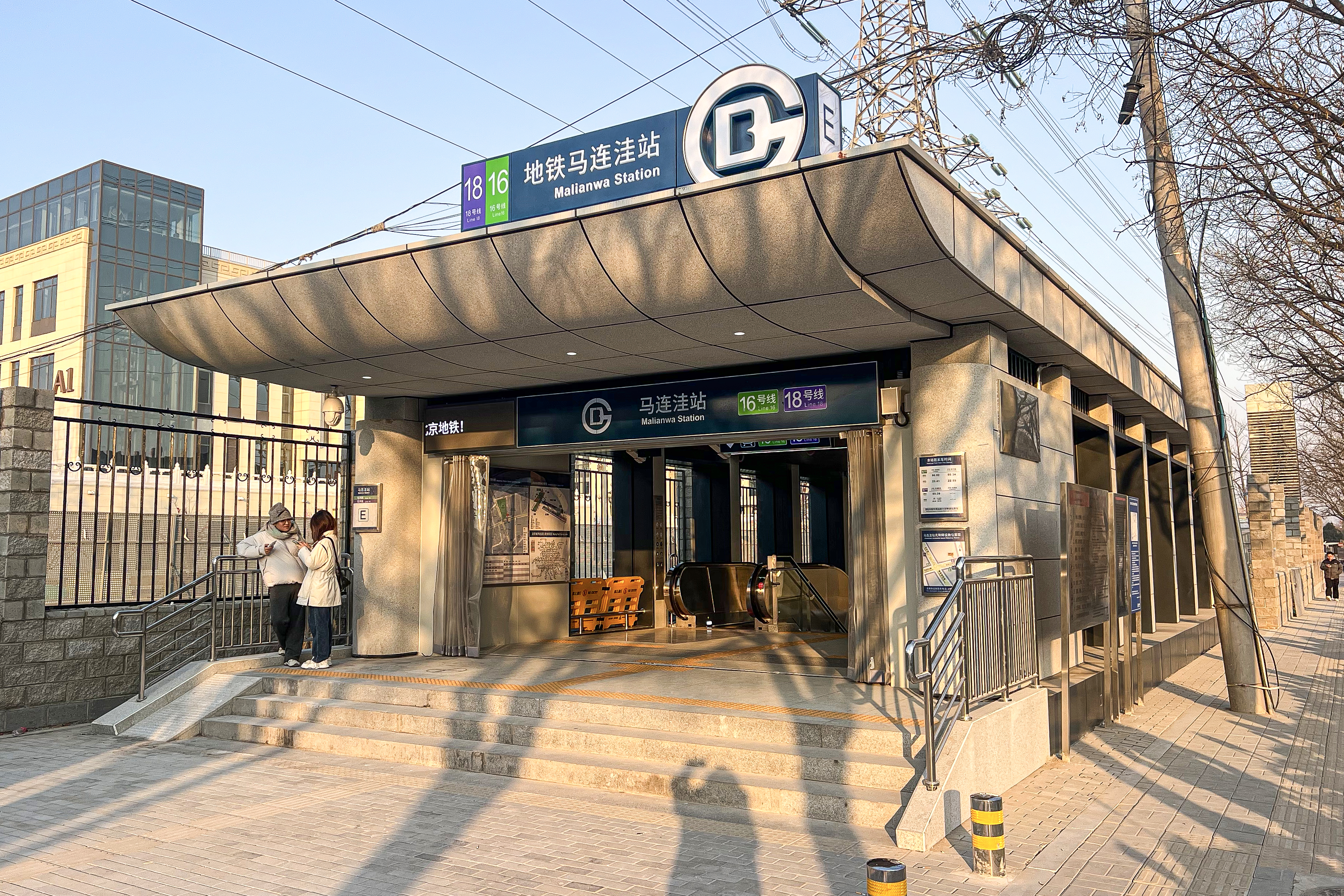
Exit E, Line 18

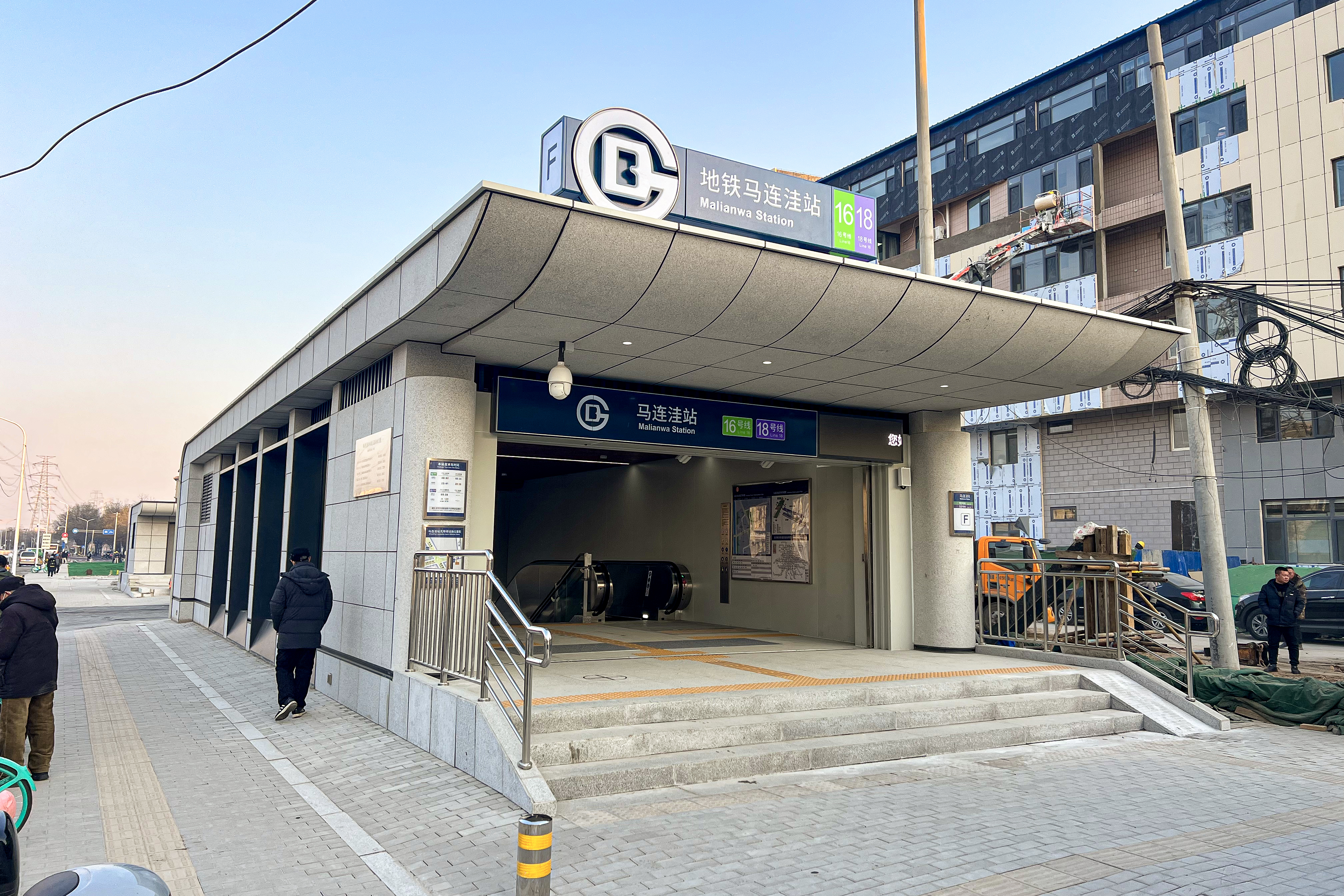
Exit F, Line 18

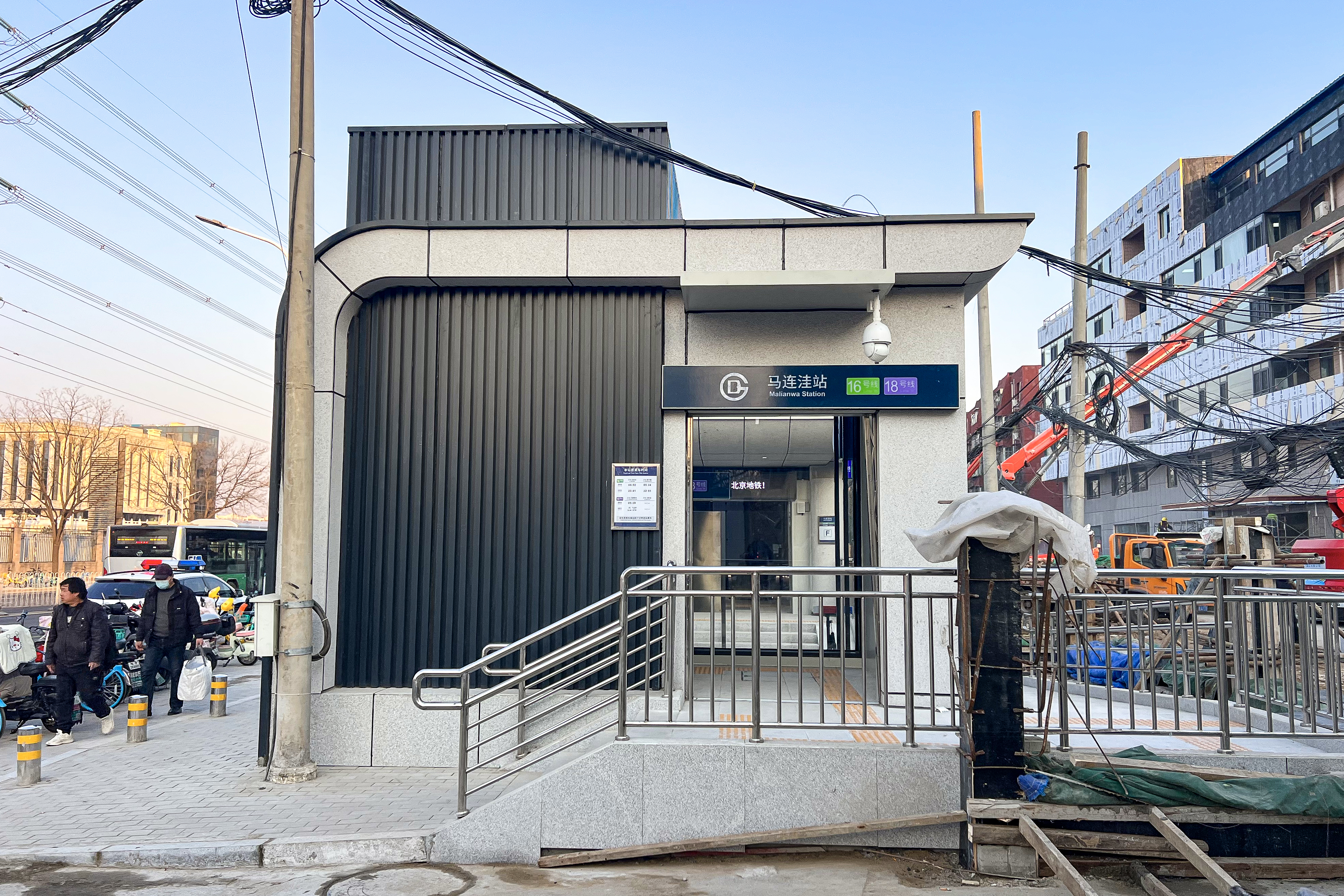
Exit F (elevator exit)

== Future development ==
The Line 18 station initially opened on December 27, 2025, as a part of Line 13 split project. In December 2027, the station will be transferred to become part of the new Line 13.
