= Line 16 (Beijing Subway) =

Metro line in Beijing, China

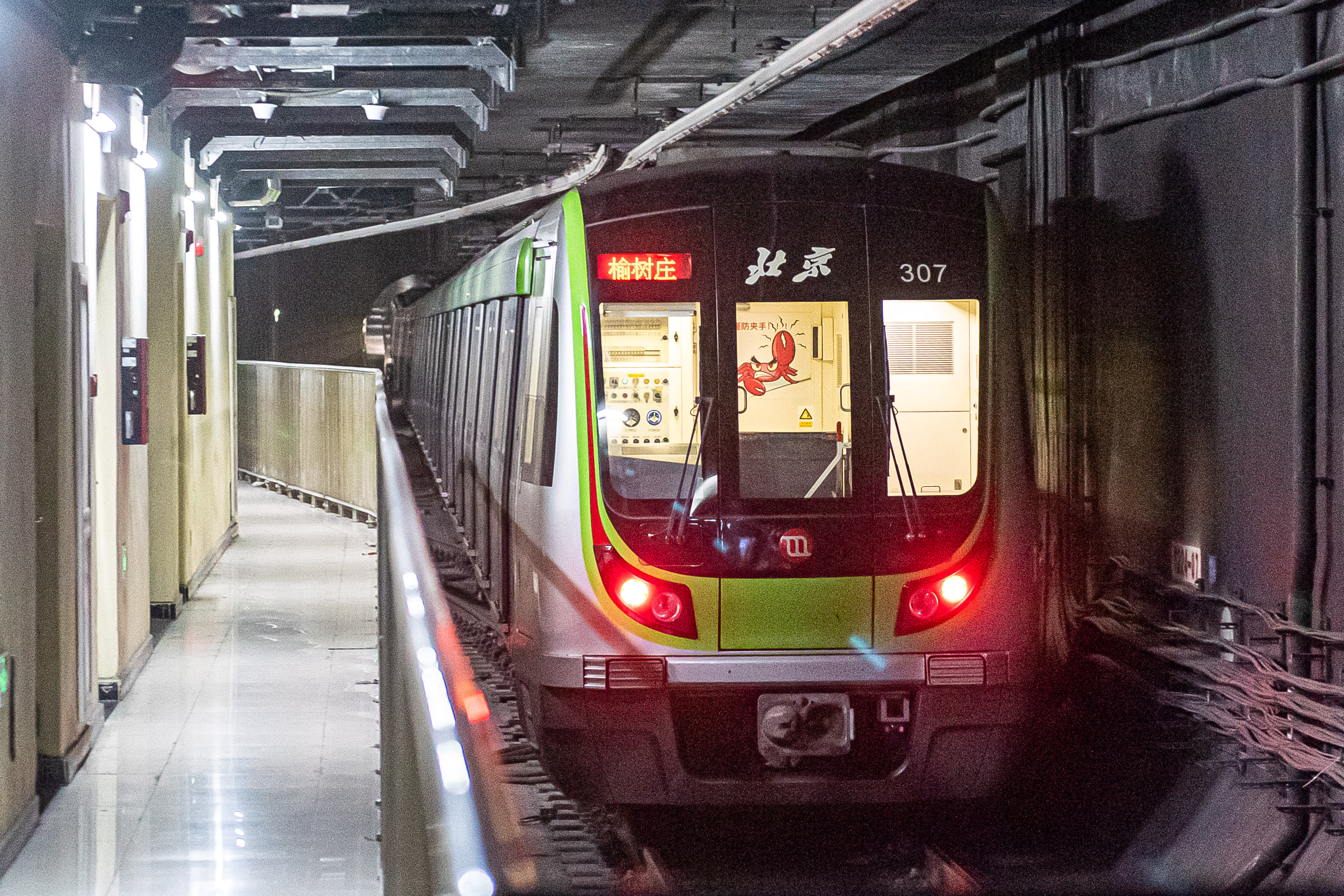
- Line 16 train leaving Fengtai railway station

Overview
- Other name: M16 (planned name)
- Status: Operational
- Locale: Fengtai, Xicheng and Haidian District; Beijing
- Termini: Bei'anhe; Wanpingcheng
- Stations: 30

Service
- Type: Rapid transit
- System: Beijing Subway
- Operator: Beijing MTR Metro Line 16 Corp., Ltd.
- Depot(s): Bei'anhe and Yushuzhuang
- Rolling stock: 8-car Type A (DKZ93, SFM40)
- Daily ridership: 292,000 (2024 Avg.)

History
- Opened: 31 December 2016; 9 years ago

Technical
- Line length: 48.9 km (30.4 mi) (not including depot access lines); 49.8 km (30.9 mi) (including depot access lines)
- Character: Underground
- Track gauge: 1,435 mm (4 ft 8 1/2 in) standard gauge
- Electrification: 1,500 V DC from overhead catenary
- Operating speed: 80 km/h (50 mph)

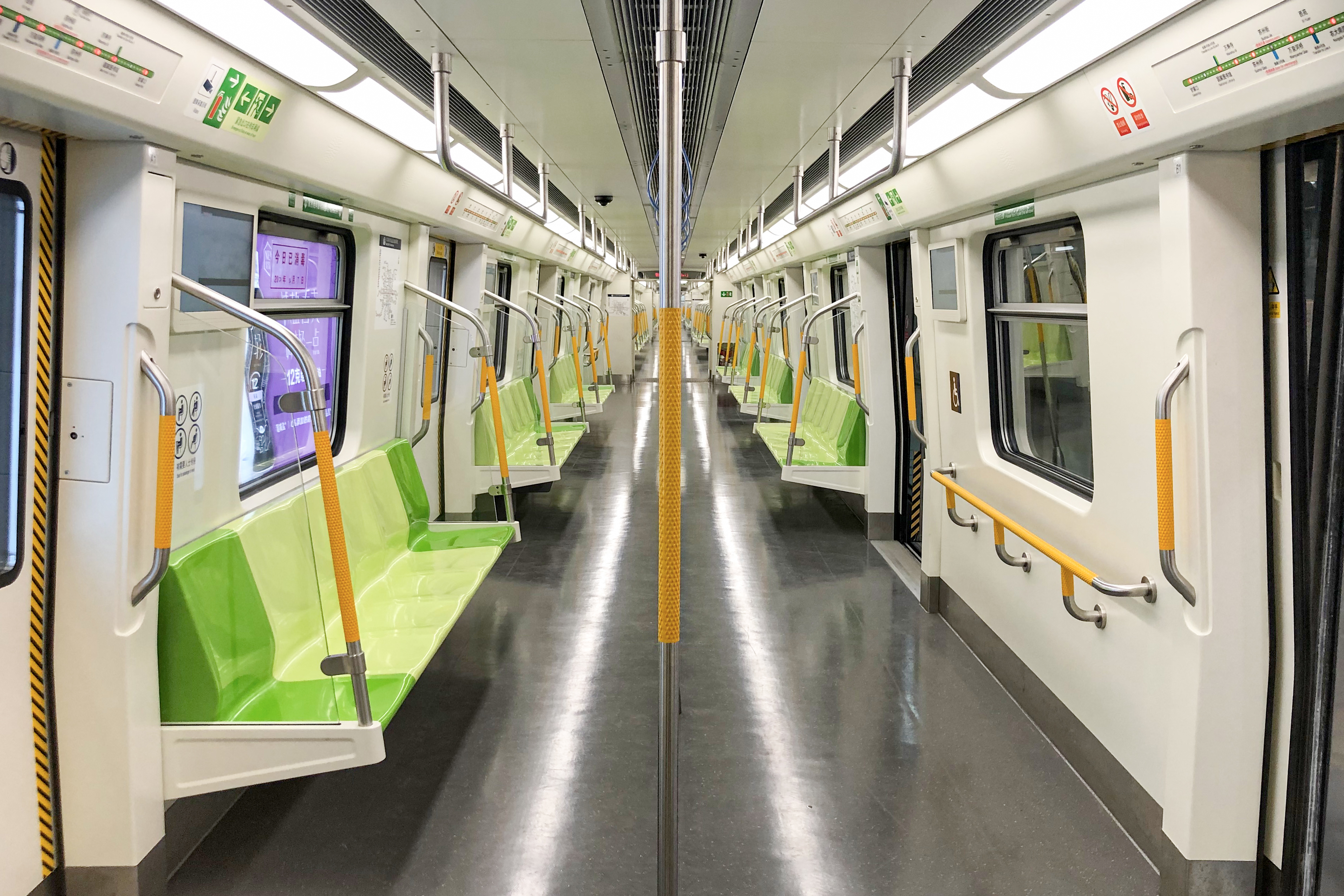
Inside Line 16 trains

Line 16 of the Beijing Subway (Chinese: 北京地铁16号线; pinyin: běijīng dìtiě shíliù hàoxiàn) is a rapid transit line in Beijing. It is 48.9 km (30.4 mi) in length with 30 stations. The line is fully underground.

Construction began in December 2013. The northern section, from Bei'anhe to Xiyuan, was opened on 31 December 2016. An infill station, Nongda Nanlu, was opened on 30 December 2017. It extended to Ganjiakou on 31 December 2020, and extended to Yuyuantan East Gate on 31 December 2021. The southern section to Yushuzhuang opened on 31 December 2022. The remainder of the line to Wanpingcheng opened on 30 December 2023.

The line is operated by the Beijing MTR Corporation Limited and uses CNR Changchun DKZ93 and CSR Sifang SFM40 eight-car high-capacity wide-body Type A trains. Line 16's color is dark-moderate green.

== Route ==
The line starts at the west end of Beiqing Road (北清路), just outside of the 6th Ring Road, and follows the road east to Yongfeng Road (永丰路) where it turns south towards the city. Line 16 follows Yongfeng Road south to Xiyuan, then continues south to the National Library and Yuyuantan Dongmen (Yuyuantan Park East Gate). It then continues south, passing through Muxidi, Daguanying, and turns west through Fengtai railway station, then west-southwest through Yushuzhuang before traversing slightly west north-west to end at Wanpingcheng.

== History ==
In 2009, Line 16 was among the 198 major urban planning projects listed by Beijing's development and reform commission. At that time, Line 16 was slated to run about 35 km (21.7 mi), from Huilongguan in Changping District to Huaxiang in Fengtai District.

According to the June 2010 plans, the northern section of Line 16 will replace the originally planned Line 4 northern extension and run 48 km (29.8 mi) from Bei'anhe in Haidian District, south to Xiaoyueyuan, near the Lugou Bridge in Fengtai District. The line would begin near Bei'anhe, and provide access to parts of Haidian, north of the foothills the Western Hills that extend into Haidian District. For this reason, that section of the line was also referred to as the Haidian Shanhou (literal translation: Haidian Back Mountain) Line because it begins on the backside of the low-lying range that extends from the Fragrant Hills to the Summer Palace. Points of interest that the line may pass along the route to Xiaoyueyuan in the south include the Summer Palace, Haidian Gymnasium, National Library, Purple Bamboo Park, Beijing Zoo, Chegongzhuang West Road, Sanlihe, Wanshou Temple, Lize Shangwuqu (Lize Business District), and the Beijing Fengtai railway station. The proposal was scaled back with the removal of the Haidian Shanhou section in December 2010, reducing the line to just 23 km (14.3 mi), from Suzhou Jie to Wanpingcheng. But the northern section was subsequently restored months later, bringing the line length 49 km (30.4 mi).

The Beijing Municipal Commission of Urban Planning released the plans for several subway stations in 2013. Construction of the line began in December 2013.

On 28 November 2015, the Concession Agreement for Line 16 was signed by the Beijing Municipal Government and BJMTR. Line 16 is a PPP project and BJMTR would participate in the investment, operations and maintenance of the new line. Under the Concession Agreement, BJMTR would undertake the operations and maintenance of Line 16 for a term of 30 years. The Beijing Municipal Government is responsible for the investment and construction of Part A (tunnels, station structure etc.), while BJMTR invested 14.5 billion RMB and is responsible for investing in and constructing Part B of the Line 16 project (rolling stocks, signaling systems, ticket machines etc.).

The northern section, from Bei'anhe to Xiyuan, except for Nongda Nanlu, opened on 31 December 2016. Nongda Nanlu opened on 30 December 2017. In April 2020, the Beijing Municipal Commission of Development and Reform decided to build an infill station on the southern section of Line 16: Yushuzhuang North (now renamed to Hongtaizhuang).

On 31 December 2020, the middle section from Xiyuan to Ganjiakou opened. (Suzhou Jie and Erligou stations were not opened)

On 31 December 2021, a one-station extension to Yuyuantan Dongmen (Yuyuantan Park East Gate) opened.

On 31 December 2022, the southern section of Line 16 (from Yuyuantan Dongmen (Yuyuantan Park East Gate) to Yushuzhuang) opened. (Lize Shangwuqu station was not opened)

On 18 March 2023, Erligou station started operation.

On 30 December 2023, the extension from Yushuzhuang to Wanpingcheng, and the infill station Suzhou Jie, started operation.

On 19 January 2025, Lize Shangwuqu station opened.

Segment	Commencement	Length	Station(s)	Name
Bei'anhe — Xi Yuan	31 December 2016	19.6 km (12.18 mi)	9	Northern section
Nongda Nanlu	30 December 2017	Infill station	1	Northern section
Xi Yuan — Ganjia Kou	31 December 2020	10.929 km (6.79 mi)	5	Middle section
Ganjia Kou — Yuyuantan Park East Gate	31 December 2021	0.97 km (0.60 mi)	1	Middle section
Yuyuantan Park East Gate — Yushuzhuang	31 December 2022	14.234 km (8.84 mi)	9	Southern section
Erligou	18 March 2023	Infill station	1	Middle section
Yushuzhuang — Wanpingcheng	30 December 2023	2.7 km (1.7 mi)	2	Southern section
Suzhou Jie	30 December 2023	Infill station	1	Middle section
Lize Shangwuqu	19 January 2025	Infill station	1	Southern section

== List of stations ==
List of stations from north to south.

Station Name		Connections	Nearby Bus Stops	Distance km		Location
English	Chinese	Connections	Nearby Bus Stops	Distance km		Location
Bei'anhe	北安河		昌72 专16 专54 专99	0.000	0.490	Haidian
Wenyang Lu	温阳路		330 642 651 902 908 920 快速直达专线46 快速直达专线49 专54	2.653	3.143	Haidian
Daoxianghu Lu	稻香湖路		448 448区 543 642 902 快速直达专线153 专54	2.310	5.453	Haidian
Tundian	屯佃		303 512 543 575 902 快速直达专线202 快速直达专线203	2.352	7.805	Haidian
Yongfeng	永丰		446 512 543 575 902 快速直达专线32 快速直达专线153 快速直达专线202 快速直达专线203	1.960	9.765	Haidian
Yongfengnan	永丰南		365 384 438 575 623 902 908 专151	1.315	11.080	Haidian
Xibeiwang	西北旺		333 384 438 575 623 902 908 快速直达专线67 专143 专220	2.108	13.188	Haidian
Malianwa	马连洼	18	305 328 333 362 438 449 476 509 518 575 623 651 932	2.195	15.383	Haidian
Nongda Nanlu	农大南路		305 333 362 393 437 438 476 509 575 608 636 651 688 快速直达专线67	1.517	16.900	Haidian
Xi Yuan	西苑	4	129 303 331 332 333 346 384 393 394 432 437 438 476 508 534 563 579 584 601 610 636 644 671 686 688 夜8	2.690	19.590	Haidian
Wanquanhe Qiao	万泉河桥		56 400 528 982 快速直达专线177	1.980	21.570	Haidian
Suzhou Jie	苏州街	10	26 56 302 307 361 386 424 450 528 613 630 634 644 671 688 快速直达专线26 快速直达专线37 快速直达专线126 快速直达专线127 快速直达专线177 快速直达专线204	1.486	23.056	Haidian
Suzhou Qiao	苏州桥	12	26 56 74 323 355 361 365 368 425 450 563 610 614 634 651 688 921 夜30	1.497	24.553	Haidian
Wanshou Si	万寿寺		74 300 323 362 368 394 450 534 603 610 634 645 夜30	1.610	26.163	Haidian
Guojia Tushuguan (National Library)	国家图书馆	4 9	56 86 92 129 305 320 332 481 609 653 658 695 夜8	1.721	27.884	Haidian
Erligou	二里沟	6	4 102 103 114 118 320 693 夜3	1.589	29.473	Haidian / Xicheng
Ganjia Kou	甘家口		10 61 101 102 103 114 121 320 612 686 夜13	1.046	30.519	Haidian / Xicheng
Yuyuantan Dongmen (Yuyuantan Park East Gate)	玉渊潭东门		13 21 32 68 94 114 320 专138	0.970	31.489	Haidian / Xicheng
Muxidi	木樨地	1 (Note: Requires an out-of-system interchange.)	1 1区 21 32 52 68 78 85 94 114 308 320 夜1 夜8	0.565	32.054	Haidian
Daguanying	达官营	7	6 38 45 46 53 57 69 76 80 85 109 122 133 137 390 410 477 夜7 专27 专138 专154 专191	2.004	34.058	Xicheng
Honglian Nanlu	红莲南路		26 30 45 80 89 414 通医专线1	1.552	35.610	Xicheng
Lize Shangwuqu	丽泽商务区	14	74 83 458 629 958 977 997	1.241	36.851	Fengtai
Dongguantounan	东管头南	Fangshan	49 67 483 629 678 692 845 912 夜7 夜30	1.803	38.654	Fengtai
Fengtai railway station	丰台站	10 FTP	夜7 专4 专149	1.794	40.448	Fengtai
Fengtai Nanlu	丰台南路	9	69 351 353 602 627 845 专149	1.420	41.868	Fengtai
Fufengqiao	富丰桥		83 137 323 353 354 387 395 400 400快 470 477 480 546 840 967 969 快速直达专线10 快速直达专线25 快速直达专线107 快速直达专线161 快速直达专线175 夜36 专63 专68 专149	1.187	43.055	Fengtai
Kandan	看丹		678 快速直达专线161 专68	1.226	44.281	Fengtai
Yushuzhuang	榆树庄		349 678 快速直达专线161 专68	1.442	45.723	Fengtai
Hongtaizhuang	洪泰庄		349 678	1.681	47.404	Fengtai
Wanpingcheng	宛平城		77 97 133 309 310 329 339 452 458 459 624 683 843 896 952 快速直达专线161 专17	1.713	49.117	Fengtai

== Rolling stock ==
Model	Image	Manufacturer	Year built	Amount in service	Fleet numbers	Depot
DKZ93		CRRC Changchun Railway Vehicles	2016	35	301–335	Beianhe
SFM40		CRRC Qingdao Sifang	2016	29	336–364	Beianhe

Formation

	← Bei'anhe Yushuzhuang →							
Car No.	1	2	3	4	5	6	7	8
Designation	Tc1	Mp1	M1	Mp3	M3	M2	Mp2	Tc2

== Sources ==
"北京地铁16号线工程环境影响报告信息公告". 铁道第三勘察设计院集团有限公司. 8 April 2011. Archived from the original on 31 October 2013.

"北京地铁16号线工程环境影响报告书简本". 铁道第三勘察设计院集团有限公司. 26 October 2012.

"地铁下月开工16号线". 京华时报、京华网. 17 February 2013. Archived from the original on 17 November 2013.

"北京地铁十六号线二期（原海淀山后线）工程环境影响评价信息二次公示". 铁道第三勘察设计院集团有限公司. 10 December 2013. Archived from the original on 12 December 2013.
