= Bei'anhe station =

Beijing Subway station

Coordinates: 40°04′05″N 116°07′50″E

Bei'anhe 北安河
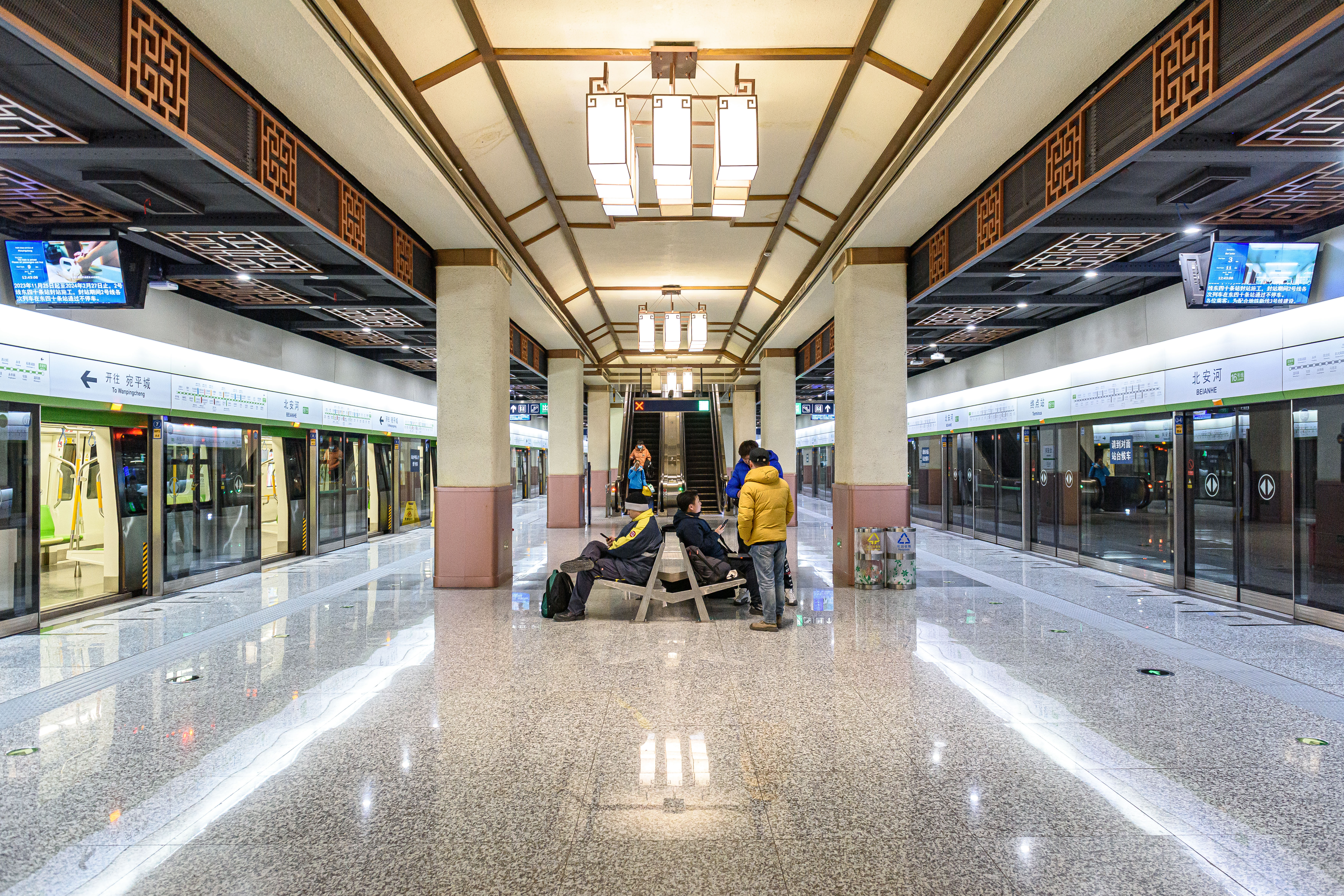
- Platform

General information
- Location: Beiqing Road (北清路); Sujiatuo, Haidian District, Beijing; China
- Operator: Beijing MTR Metro Line 16 Corp., Ltd.
- Line: Line 16
- Platforms: 2 (1 island platform)
- Tracks: 2

Construction
- Structure type: Underground
- Accessible: Yes

History
- Opened: December 31, 2016

Services
Preceding station	Beijing Subway	Following station
Terminus	Line 16	Wenyang Lu towards Wanpingcheng
Location
- Location within Beijing

Bei'anhe station (Chinese: 北安河站; pinyin: Běi'ānhé Zhàn) is a station on the Line 16 of the Beijing Subway. The station opened on December 31, 2016.

== Station layout ==
The station has an underground island platform.

== Exits ==
There are 4 exits, lettered A, B, C, and D. Exits A and C are accessible.

== Transport connections ==
=== Rail ===
Schedule as of December 2016:

Destination	First Train	Last Train
Line 16
to Wanpingcheng	5.13am	10.34pm
