= Kornai =

Kornai is a surname. Notable people with the surname include:

- Josef (József) Kornai (1889–1989), Hungarian painter
- János Kornai (Kornhauser) (1928–2021), Jewish Hungarian economist, noted for his analysis and criticism of the command economies of Eastern European communist states
  - András Kornai (born 1957), Hungarian mathematical linguist
    - Kornai-Liptak Decomposition
