= Wan'an station (Beijing Subway) =

Beijing Subway light rail station

Wan'an 万安
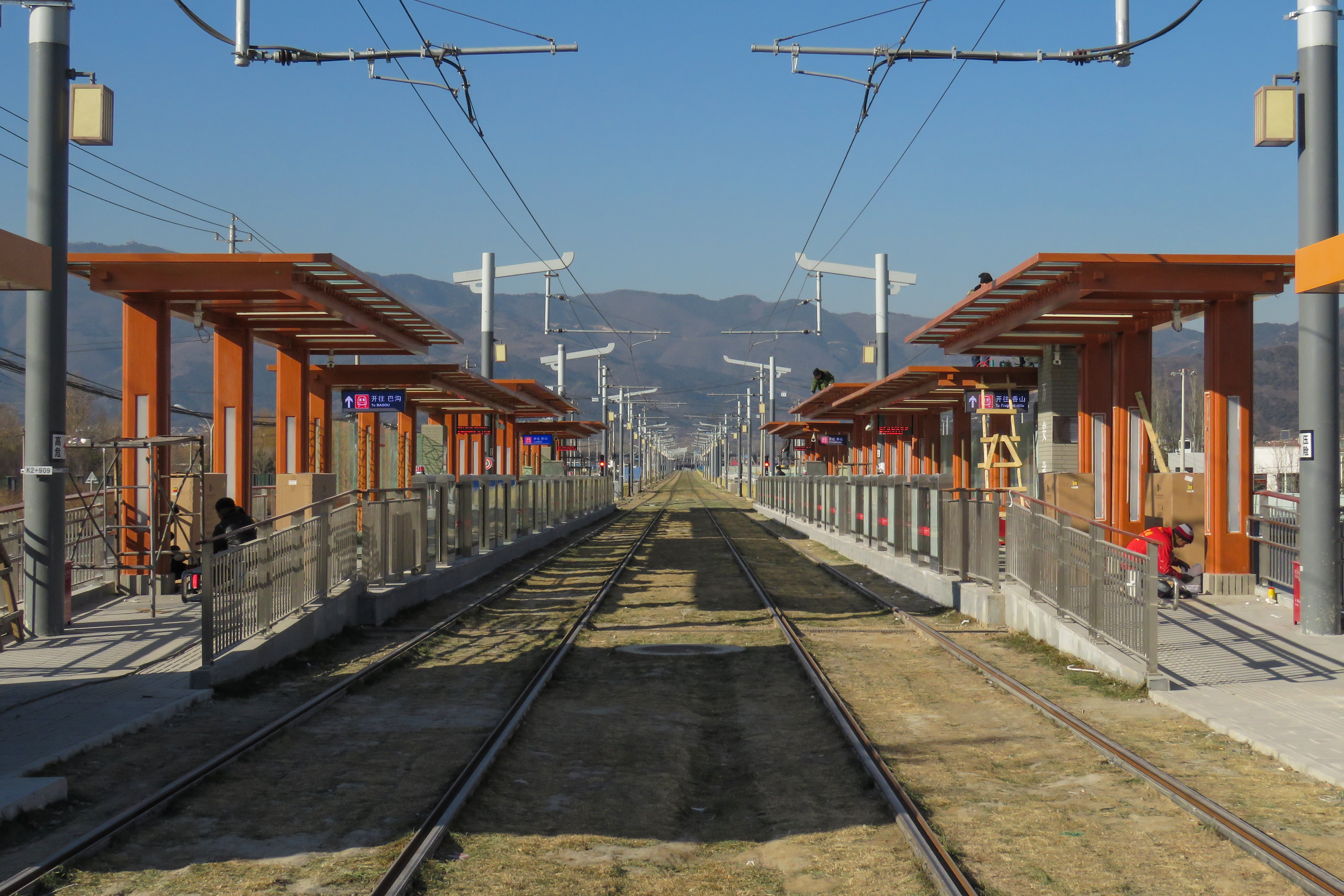
- Platform

General information
- Location: Hanhe Road (旱河路); Haidian District, Beijing; China
- Coordinates: 39°59′02″N 116°13′55″E
- Operator: Beijing Public Transit Tramway Co., Ltd.
- Line: Xijiao line
- Platforms: 2 (2 side platforms)
- Tracks: 2

Construction
- Structure type: At-grade
- Accessible: Yes

History
- Opened: 30 December 2017

Services
Preceding station	Beijing Subway	Following station
Guojia Zhiwuyuan (National Botanical Garden) towards Fragrant Hills	Xijiao line	Chapeng towards Bagou
Location
- Location within Beijing

Wan'an station (simplified Chinese: 万安站; traditional Chinese: 萬安站; pinyin: Wàn'ān Zhàn) is a station on Xijiao line (light rail) of the Beijing Subway. It was opened on 30 December 2017.

== Station layout ==
The station has 2 at-grade side platforms.
