= Chenggang Xu =

Chinese economist at Stanford University

- Born: December 31, 1950 (age 75); China Hangzhou, Zhejiang Province

Academic background
- Education: Tsinghua University; Harvard University (PhD)
- Thesis: Innovation, Productivity, and Labor Mobility in Socialist Economies (1991)
- Doctoral advisor: Eric Maskin, Janos Kornai, Dwight Perkins
- Other advisors: Andreu Mas-Colell, Dwight Perkins

Academic work
- School or tradition: New Institutional Economics
- Institutions: Stanford University
- Website: https://sites.google.com/view/cgxu/chenggang-xu

Chenggang Xu (born December 31, 1950) is a senior research scholar at the Stanford Center on China's Economic and Institutions, a visiting fellow at the Hoover Institution at Stanford University, and a visiting professor at the department of finance, Imperial College London, and a research fellow of the Centre for Economic Policy Research (CEPR).

== Life ==
Xu was born in Hangzhou in 1950 and grew up in Beijing, where he studied at Xiangshan Charity School and Tsinghua University Middle School. His father, Xu Liangying, was labeled a rightist in 1957, and his “crimes” were published in major media such as People's Daily and Guangming Daily. He was forced to leave his job and work as a farmer in the countryside. Xu's mother was expelled from the Communist Party and demoted from her post as a result of the incident. Before the Cultural Revolution, Xu, a committed communist in his youth, served as the deputy leader for the Young Pioneers junior squadron at Tsinghua University Middle School.

Following the outbreak of the Cultural Revolution in 1966, when Xu was a second-year student at Tsinghua University Middle School, Xu began to research communism after becoming interested in the idea of class struggle. From 1967 to 1969, in order to better understand China's class relations and rural reality, he applied to go to the state-run farm in Heilongjiang. While there, he studied Das Kapital, wrote a number of papers, and developed the idea of writing a book analyzing the socialist system and the Cultural Revolution. Because of his frequent discussions with local villagers and his classmates in Tsinghua via letters, he was branded as a counter-revolutionary in early 1970 and detained for more than a year for “organizing an inter-provincial counter-revolutionary group” and then forced to work for more than five years. During this time, he was forced to suspend the study and exploration of political economy until the end of the Cultural Revolution.

In 1982, Xu received a master's degree in mechanical engineering from Tsinghua University. In 1991 he earned his PhD in economics, completing a dissertation titled Innovation, productivity, and labor mobility in socialist economies. He has held several prestigious teaching positions, serving as the Chung Hon-Dak Professor of Economics at the University of Hong Kong, a Special-term Professor of Economics at Tsinghua University, a World-Class University Professor of Economics at Seoul National University, and a Reader in Economics at London School of Economics (LSE). He was an inaugural recipient of the China Economics Prize (2016) and a recipient of the Sun Yefang Economics Prize (2013).

== Research ==
Xu’s primary research interests include political economy, institutional economics, law and economics, development economics, and transition economics, with a particular focus on the political economy of China.

Institutional Genes

Xu introduces a conceptual framework "Insitutional Genes" to explain the mechanisms of path dependence. In his 2025 book, Institutional Genes: Origins of China's Institutions and Totalitarianism, he characterizes the People's Republic of China as totalitarian in nature. This book explores the origins and evolution of China's institutions as well as communist totalitarianism more broadly, arguing that contemporary China's fundamental institutional structure is rooted in communist totalitarianism.

By introducing the concept of “institutional genes” (IGs), the book examines how the IGs of Soviet Russia merged with those of the Chinese imperial system, creating a durable totalitarian regime with Chinese characteristics – Regionally Administered Totalitarianism (RADT). Institutional Genes are fundamental institutional elements that self-replicate and guide institutional changes and are empirically identifiable. By analyzing the origins and evolution of these institutional genes across key historical epochs—including their roots in Europe and Russia, the Chinese Empire, the Chinese Communist Revolution, the Great Leap Forward, the Cultural Revolution, and post-Mao reforms—the book elucidates the rise and progression of communist totalitarianism in China. The ascent of communist China echoes Ludwig von Mises' warning that early efforts to halt totalitarianism have failed; reversing this trend, Xu argues, necessitates a thorough and rigorous understanding of totalitarian mechanisms.

RADT, Economic Reform and Economic Slowdown

Chenggang Xu defines Regionally Administered Totalitarianism (RADT) as a distinctive form of communist totalitarianism with Chinese characteristics. In his framework, RADT represents the institutional evolution of the Chinese Communist Party (CCP) from a Soviet-style centralized system into a more adaptable, regionally administered model that has endured to the present day. Under the RADT system, political power is absolutely centralized, while administration and enforcement are regionally organized. The CCP monopolizes all political authority, ideology, and personnel control, but delegates economic management and policy implementation to regional governments. These regions function as extensions of the central regime, responsible for executing central directives, maintaining social control, and fulfilling performance targets. Unlike the Soviet model of centralized command planning, RADT relies on regional bureaucratic competition and administrative mobilization rather than independent markets or rule-based institutions.

According to Xu, the RADT system emerged when China departed from the Soviet model during the Great Leap Forward (1958), as Mao Zedong devolved most centrally managed enterprises to local governments to bypass the technocratic bureaucracy, effectively dismantling Soviet-style planning. Local officials competed to meet political targets such as steel and grain production, generating massive economic waste, falsified statistics, and catastrophic famine. During the Cultural Revolution (1966–1976), the collapse of central ministries further empowered regional authorities, creating self-sufficient provincial economies under the Party’s ideological monopoly—a structure Xu identifies as the institutional foundation of RADT. Ultimately, he traces the roots of this system back to China’s imperial governance traditions of centralized rule with local administration, as well as the CCP’s wartime “liberated-area” system, which combined political obedience with economic autonomy.

In Xu’s framework, the economic reforms initiated after 1978 did not represent a fundamental political transformation, but rather a strategic adjustment essential for the CCP’s survival. Confronted with economic stagnation and a severe legitimacy crisis, the Party shifted its core objective from class struggle to economic growth. Under the RADT structure, local governments were encouraged to compete and experiment to drive development, attract investment, and promote innovation, while the CCP retained its absolute monopoly over ideology, personnel, and political power. This arrangement transformed regional competition into a powerful engine for growth, enabling pragmatic experiments such as rural household contracting, township and village enterprises, and special economic zones. Xu terms this relatively loosened phase Regionally Decentralized Authoritarianism (RDA)—a temporary period within the broader RADT system characterized by expanded local autonomy, flourishing private enterprise, and the re-emergence of limited civil-society activity. However, because the underlying institutions of RADT—such as state ownership, soft-budget constraints, and the absence of rule of law—remained intact, this RDA phase was inherently unstable and conditional.

Following the 2008 global financial crisis, these structural weaknesses—combined with rising CCP fears of a "color revolution" and social unrest—triggered a gradual re-centralization of power. The central government tightened its grip on finance, state-owned enterprises, media, and ideology, while simultaneously curtailing local discretion and strengthening political surveillance. Since the 2010s, China has reverted from RDA back to a consolidated RADT system, restoring comprehensive Party authority and reinforcing totalitarian governance while retaining the regional administrative mechanisms that once fueled its economic rise.

Xu argues that this unique RADT governance structure explains why the CCP’s totalitarian regime has proven more resilient than other historical communist systems. Yet, he also emphasizes that totalitarian regimes do not peacefully evolve into constitutional democracies; instead, they typically collapse before genuine systemic change can occur. Ultimately, Xu concludes that without a fundamental transformation of the political regime, sustained economic growth under totalitarian rule is impossible due to the systemic constraints of state ownership and the absolute absence of legal and institutional accountability.

== Selected publications ==
- Xu C. Institutional Genes: Origins of China’s Institutions and Totalitarianism. Cambridge University Press; 2025
- Xu, Chenggang (December 2011). "The Fundamental Institutions of China's Reforms and Development". Journal of Economic Literature. 49 (4): 1076–1151. doi:10.1257/jel.49.4.1076. hdl:10722/153452.
- Xu, Chenggang (2022). "The Origin of China's Communist Institutions: from Part II - 1950 to the Present". In Ma, Debin; von Glahn, Richard (eds.). The Cambridge Economic History of China. pp. 531–564. doi:10.1017/9781108348485. ISBN 978-1-108-34848-5.
- Xu, Chenggang (2012). "Institutional Foundations of China's Structural Problems". The Chinese Economy. pp. 272–290. doi:10.1057/9781137034298_13. ISBN 978-1-137-03428-1.
- Xu, Chenggang (March 2017). "Capitalism and Socialism: A Review of Kornai's Dynamism, Rivalry, and the Surplus Economy". Journal of Economic Literature. 55 (1): 191–208. doi:10.1257/jel.20151282.
- Xu, Cheng-Gang (December 2014). Political and Economic Institutions of China and Their Influences (Report). SSRN 2554395.
- Xu, Chenggang (March 2019). "The pitfalls of a centralized bureaucracy". Acta Oeconomica. 69 (1): 1–16. doi:10.1556/032.2019.69.1.1.
- Maskin, Eric; Qian, Yingyi; Xu, Chenggang (2000). "Incentives, Information, and Organizational Form". The Review of Economic Studies. 67 (2): 359–378. doi:10.1111/1467-937X.00135. hdl:10722/138702. JSTOR 2566987.
- Qian, Yingyi; Xu, Chenggang (June 1993). "Why China's economic reforms differ: the M-form hierarchy and entry/expansion of the non-state sector". Economics of Transition. 1 (2): 135–170. doi:10.1111/j.1468-0351.1993.tb00077.x.
- Qian, Yingyi; Roland, Gérard; Xu, Chenggang (2006). "Coordination and Experimentation in M-Form and U-Form Organizations". Journal of Political Economy. 114 (2): 366–402. doi:10.1086/501170. JSTOR 10.1086/501170.
- Weitzman, Martin L.; Xu, Chenggang (April 1994). "Chinese Township-Village Enterprises as Vaguely Defined Cooperatives". Journal of Comparative Economics. 18 (2): 121–145. doi:10.1006/jcec.1994.1020. hdl:10722/153477.
- Qian, Yingyi; Xu, Chenggang (April 1993). "The M-form hierarchy and China's economic reform". European Economic Review. 37 (2–3): 541–548. doi:10.1016/0014-2921(93)90043-A.
- Huang, Haizhou; Xu, Chenggang (March 1998). "Soft Budget Constraint and the Optimal Choices of Research and Development Projects Financing". Journal of Comparative Economics. 26 (1): 62–79. doi:10.1006/jcec.1997.1508.
- Qian, Yingyi; Xu, Chenggang (January 1998). "Innovation and Bureaucracy Under Soft and Hard Budget Constraints". Review of Economic Studies. 65 (1): 151–164. doi:10.1111/1467-937X.00039.
- Qian, Yingyi; Roland, Gérard; Xu, Chenggang (April 1999). "Why is China different from Eastern Europe? Perspectives from organization theory". European Economic Review. 43 (4–6): 1085–1094. doi:10.1016/S0014-2921(98)00116-0.
- Qian, Yingyi; Roland, Gérard; Xu, Chenggang (2007). "Coordinating Reforms in Transition Economies". The Economics of Transition: The Fifth Nobel Symposium in Economics. Palgrave Macmillan UK. pp. 518–546. doi:10.1057/978-1-349-74092-5_15 (inactive 9 November 2025). ISBN 978-1-349-74092-5.
- Maskin, Eric; Xu, Chenggang (2001). "Soft budget constraint theories: From centralization to the market". Economics of Transition. 9: 1–27. doi:10.1111/1468-0351.00065. SSRN 264383.
- Gan, Jie; Guo, Yan; Xu, Chenggang (October 2018). "Decentralized Privatization and Change of Control Rights in China". The Review of Financial Studies. 31 (10): 3854–3894. doi:10.1093/rfs/hhx100.
- Huang, Haizhou; Xu, Chenggang (April 1999). "Financial institutions and the financial crisis in East Asia". European Economic Review. 43 (4–6): 903–914. doi:10.1016/S0014-2921(98)00103-2.
- Huang, Haizhou; Xu, Chenggang (1999). "Institutions, Innovations, and Growth". The American Economic Review. 89 (2): 438–444. doi:10.1257/aer.89.2.438. JSTOR 117150.
- Huang, Haizhou; Xu, Chenggang (August 2003). "Financial syndication and R&D". Economics Letters. 80 (2): 141–146. doi:10.1016/S0165-1765(03)00087-9.
- Pistor, Katharina; Xu, Chenggang (2005). "Governing Stock Markets in Transition Economies: Lessons from China". American Law and Economics Review. 7 (1): 184–210. doi:10.1093/aler/ahi008. JSTOR 42705473.
- Katharina Pistor and Chenggang Xu, “Managers’ Fiduciary Duty and the Enforcement of Incomplete Corporate Law,” in (Curtis Milhaupt ed.), Global Markets, Domestic Institutions, New York: Columbia University Press, July 2003. pp.77-106.
- Pistor, Katharina; Xu, Chenggang (2005). "Governing Stock Markets in Transition Economies: Lessons from China". American Law and Economics Review. 7 (1): 184–210. doi:10.1093/aler/ahi008. JSTOR 42705473.
- Pistor, Katharina; Xu, Chenggang (January 2005). "Governing Emerging Stock Markets: legal vs administrative governance". Corporate Governance. 13 (1): 5–10. doi:10.1111/j.1467-8683.2005.00398.x.
- Pistor, Katharina; Xu, Chenggang (2003). "Incomplete Law". NYU Journal of International Law and Politics. 35: 931–1013.
- Guo, Di; Jiang, Kun; Kim, Byung-Yeon; Xu, Chenggang (May 2014). "Political economy of private firms in China". Journal of Comparative Economics. 42 (2): 286–303. doi:10.1016/j.jce.2014.03.006. hdl:10722/198585.
- Guo, Di; Huang, Haizhou; Jiang, Kun; Xu, Chenggang (April 2021). "Disruptive innovation and R&D ownership structures". Public Choice. 187 (1–2): 143–163. doi:10.1007/s11127-020-00850-1.
- Xu, Di Guo & Chenggang (12 December 2022). "Is Today's China Yesterday's Soviet Union?". Project Syndicate.
- Guo, Di; Jiang, Kun; Xu, Chenggang; Yang, Xiyi (September 2020). "Clustering, growth and inequality in China". Journal of Economic Geography. 20 (5): 1207–1239. doi:10.1093/jeg/lbz038.
- Guo, Di; Jiang, Kun; Xu, Chenggang; Yang, Xiyi (June 2022). "Industrial clustering, income and inequality in rural China". World Development. 154 105878. doi:10.1016/j.worlddev.2022.105878.
- Andrianova, Svetlana; Demetriades, Panicos; Xu, Chenggang (May 2011). "Political Economy Origins of Financial Markets in Europe and Asia". World Development. 39 (5): 686–699. doi:10.1016/j.worlddev.2010.10.001. hdl:10722/153453.
- Chenggang Xu and Xiaobo Zhang, “The Evolution of Chinese Entrepreneurial Firms: Township-Village Enterprises Revisited,” in Wu and Yao (eds.), Reform and Development in China, London and New York: Routledge, 2010; and in Ronald Coase (ed.), China’s Economic Transformation.
- James Kung, Chenggang Xu and Feizhou Zhou, “From Industrialization to Urbanization: The Social Consequences of Changing Fiscal Incentives on Local Governments’ Behavior,” in Joseph E. Stiglitz (ed.), Institutional Design for China’s Evolving Market Economy.
- Du, Julan; Xu, Chenggang (April 2009). "Which Firms went Public in China? A Study of Financial Market Regulation". World Development. 37 (4): 812–824. doi:10.1016/j.worlddev.2008.07.012.
- Julan Du and Chenggang Xu, “Market Socialism or Capitalism? Evidence from Chinese Financial Market Development,” in Janos Kornai and Yingyi Qian (eds.), Market and Socialism (the International Economic Association Conference Volume No. 146), New York and London, Palgrave Macmillan, 2008, 88-109
