= China National Botanical Garden station =

Beijing Subway light rail station

China National Botanical Garden 国家植物园
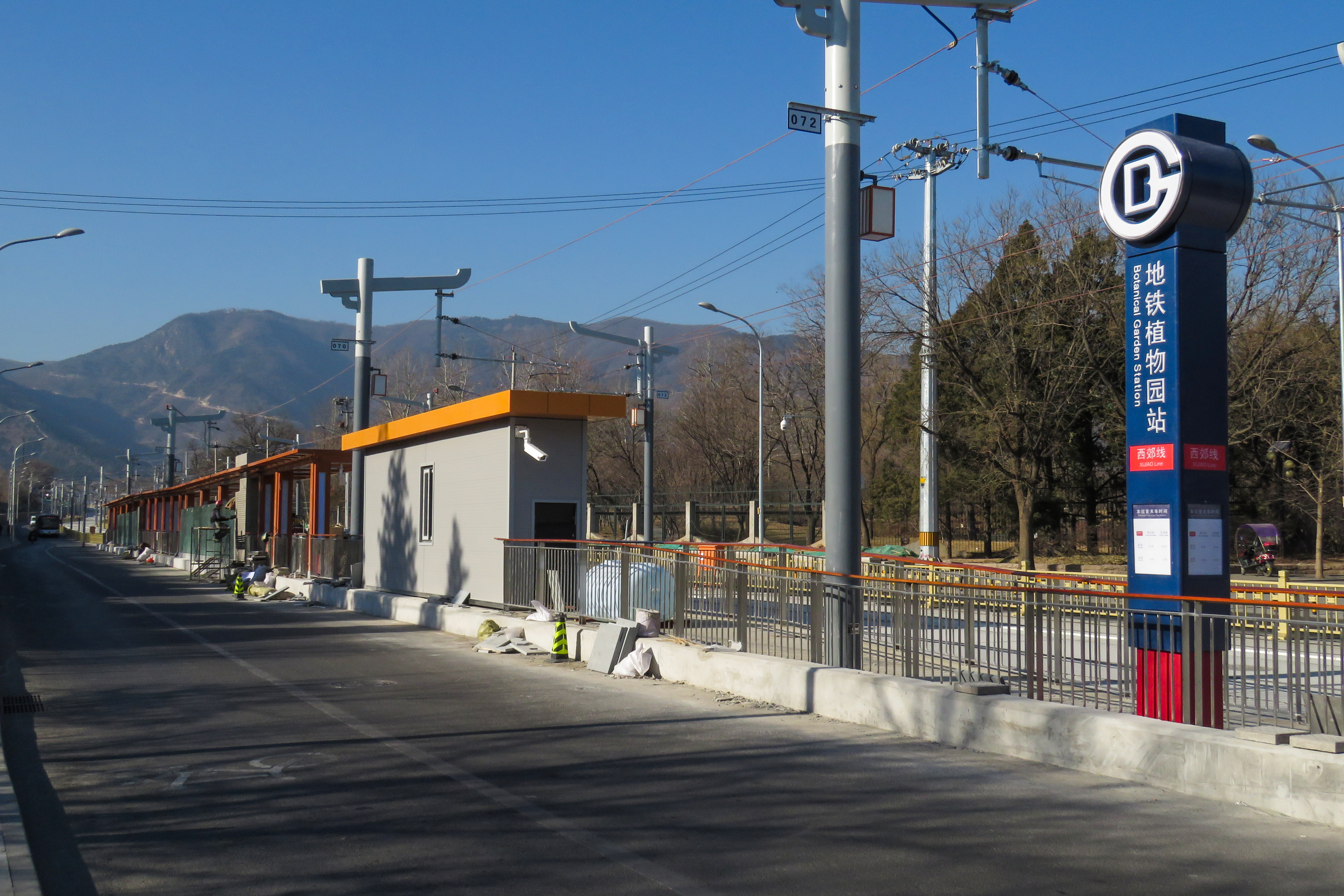
- Eastbound platform in December 2017

General information
- Location: Xiangshan Road (香山路); Xiangshan Subdistrict, Haidian District, Beijing; China
- Coordinates: 39°59′37″N 116°12′53″E
- Operator: Beijing Public Transit Tramway Co., Ltd.
- Line: Xijiao line
- Platforms: 2 (2 side platforms)
- Tracks: 2

Construction
- Structure type: At-grade
- Accessible: Yes

History
- Opened: 30 December 2017
- Former names: Botanical Garden (植物园)

Services
Preceding station	Beijing Subway	Following station
Fragrant Hills Terminus	Xijiao line	Wan'an towards Bagou
Location
- Location within Beijing

China National Botanical Garden station (simplified Chinese: 国家植物园站; traditional Chinese: 國家植物園站; pinyin: Guójiā Zhíwùyuán Zhàn), formerly known as Botanical Garden station (simplified Chinese: 植物园站; traditional Chinese: 植物園站; pinyin: Zhíwùyuán Zhàn), is a station on Xijiao line (light rail) of the Beijing Subway. It was opened on 30 December 2017. On 18 April 2022, following the renaming of China National Botanical Garden, the station was renamed to current name.

== Station layout ==
The station has 2 at-grade side platforms.

== See also ==
- China National Botanical Garden
