= Summer Palace West Gate station =

Beijing Subway light rail station

Summer Palace West Gate 颐和园西门
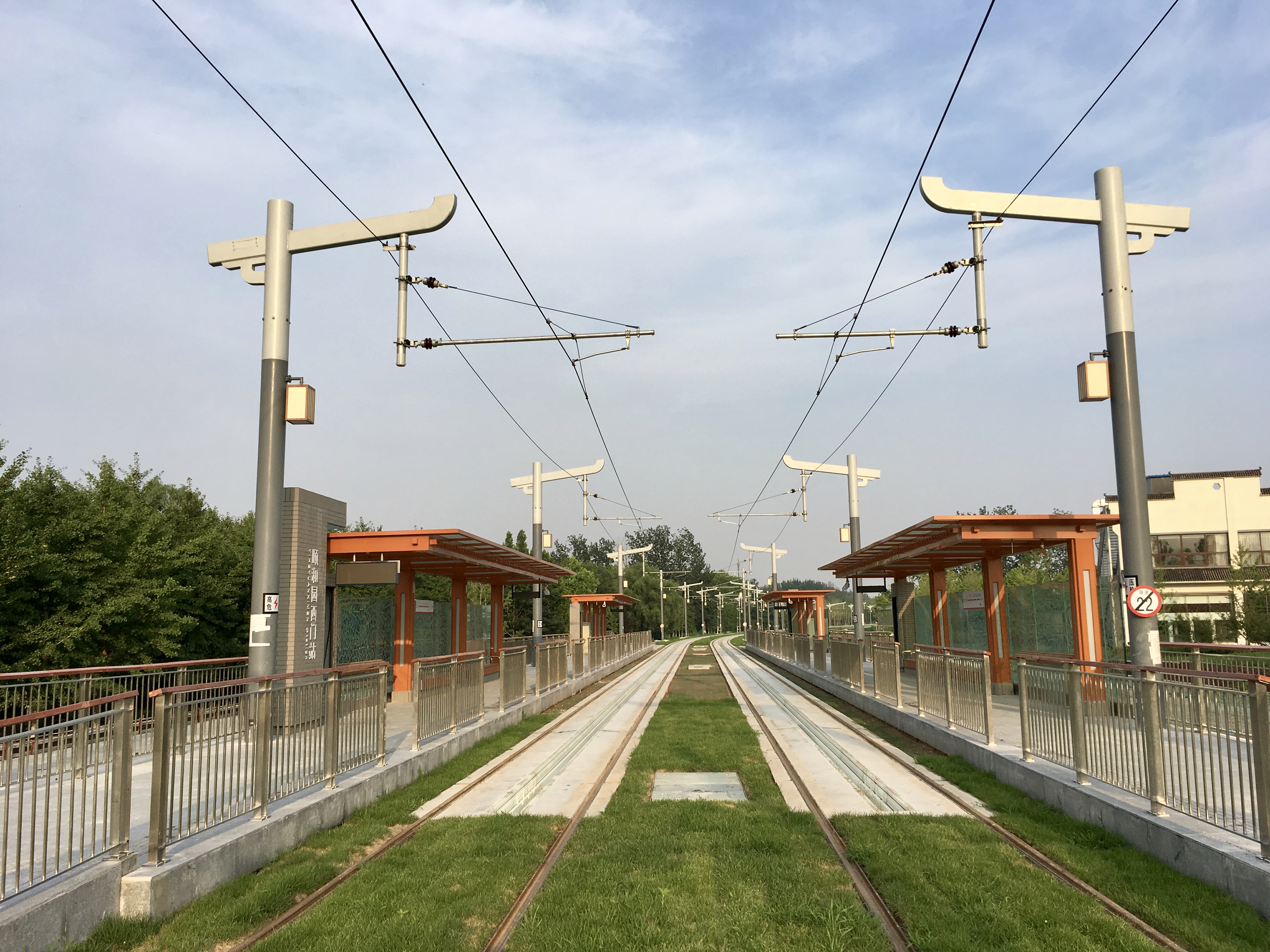
- Platform in July 2017

General information
- Location: Haidian District, Beijing; China
- Coordinates: 39°59′09″N 116°15′48″E
- Operator: Beijing Public Transit Tramway Co., Ltd.
- Line: Xijiao line
- Platforms: 2 (2 side platforms)
- Tracks: 2

Construction
- Structure type: At-grade
- Accessible: Yes

History
- Opened: 30 December 2017

Services
Preceding station	Beijing Subway	Following station
Chapeng towards Fragrant Hills	Xijiao line	Bagou Terminus
Location
- Location within Beijing

Summer Palace West Gate station (simplified Chinese: 颐和园西门站; traditional Chinese: 頤和園西門站; pinyin: Yíhéyuán Xīmén Zhàn) is a station on Xijiao line (light rail) of the Beijing Subway. It opened to the public on 30 December 2017.

== Station layout ==
The station has 2 at-grade side platforms.
