= Chapeng station =

Beijing Subway light rail station

Chapeng 茶棚
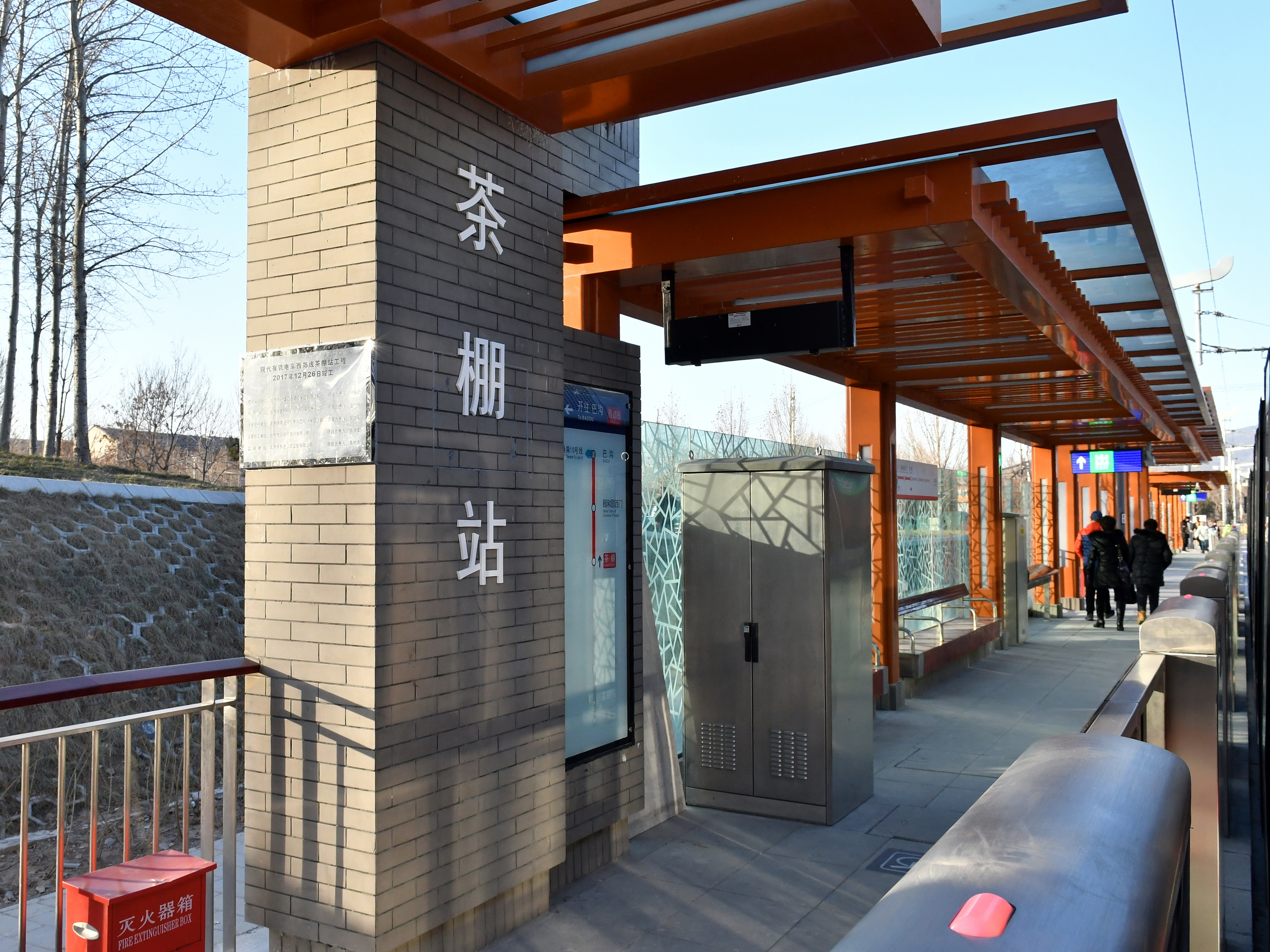
- Eastbound platform

General information
- Location: Haidian District, Beijing; China
- Coordinates: 39°58′56″N 116°14′53″E
- Operator: Beijing Public Transit Tramway Co., Ltd.
- Line: Xijiao line
- Platforms: 2 (2 side platforms)
- Tracks: 2

Construction
- Structure type: At-grade
- Accessible: Yes

History
- Opened: 30 December 2017

Services
| Preceding station | Beijing Subway | Following station |
|---|---|---|
| Wan'an towards Fragrant Hills | Xijiao line | Summer Palace West Gate towards Bagou |
Location
- Location within Beijing

Chapeng station (Chinese: 茶棚站; pinyin: Chápéng Zhàn) is a station on Xijiao line (light rail) of the Beijing Subway. It opened on 30 December 2017.

== Station layout ==
The station has 2 at-grade side platforms.
