= Hitachi Sirio =

Japanese-Italian low-floor tram type

The Hitachi Sirio (Italian for Sirius, formerly sold as the AnsaldoBreda Sirio) is a low-floor tram built by Hitachi Rail Italy (formerly AnsaldoBreda), a Japanese-Italian manufacturer of trains, trams and light-rail vehicles. It can be ordered as either one-directional or bi-directional and with a variety of track gauges.

== Operators ==
=== Italy ===
==== Milan ====
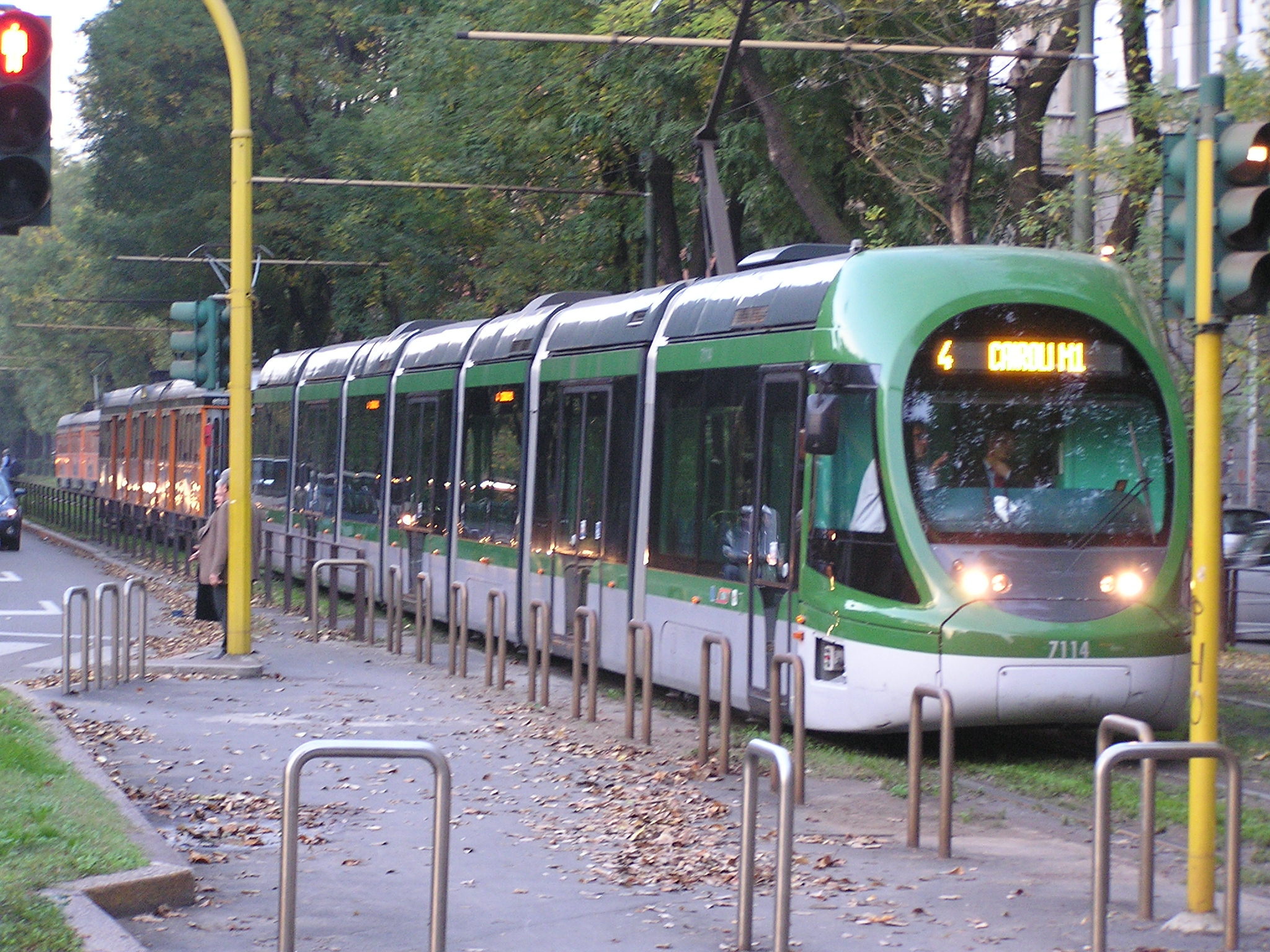
A Sirio of ATM in Milan.

Azienda Trasporti Milanesi (ATM), the city transport company of Milan, has bought numerous one-directional Sirios. In 2002, the first carriages were delivered. The ATM has 48 seven section Sirios (7100 series) with a length of 35.35 metres (116 ft 0 in); these trams can hold a capacity of 285 people, of which 71 can sit. The ATM has also 35 + 33 five section Sirietto (literally "little Sirio": 7500-7600 series) with a length of 25.15 metres (82 ft 6 in); these trams have a capacity of 206 people, of which 54 can sit. The 7600 is different from the 7500 series because of the internal seating arrangement.

Both types of Sirios have a width of 2.40 metres (7 ft 10 in) and have been built for the unusual track gauge of 1,445 mm (4 ft 8 7/8 in). The maximum speed is 70 km/h (43 mph).

Since 2022, all Sirios and Siriettos in Milan have the white-yellow livery analogue to the rest of the rolling stock.

==== Bergamo ====
Tramvie Elettriche Bergamasche (TEB) has bought 14 bi-directional Sirios composed of 5 sections for the T1 line Bergamo - Albino. The exterior design of the trams was made by Pininfarina.

==== Florence ====
Gestore Sistema Tranviario (GEST), owned partly by RATP DEV and the local transport company ATAF Gestioni bought 46 bi-directional Sirios composed of 5 sections.

==== Naples ====
Azienda Napoletana Mobilità (ANM) bought 22 bi-directional Sirios composed of 3 units.

==== Sassari ====
The Sardinian transport company, Azienda Regionale Sarda Trasporti (ARST) bought 4 bi-directional Sirios composed of 5 units.

=== Sweden ===
==== Gothenburg ====
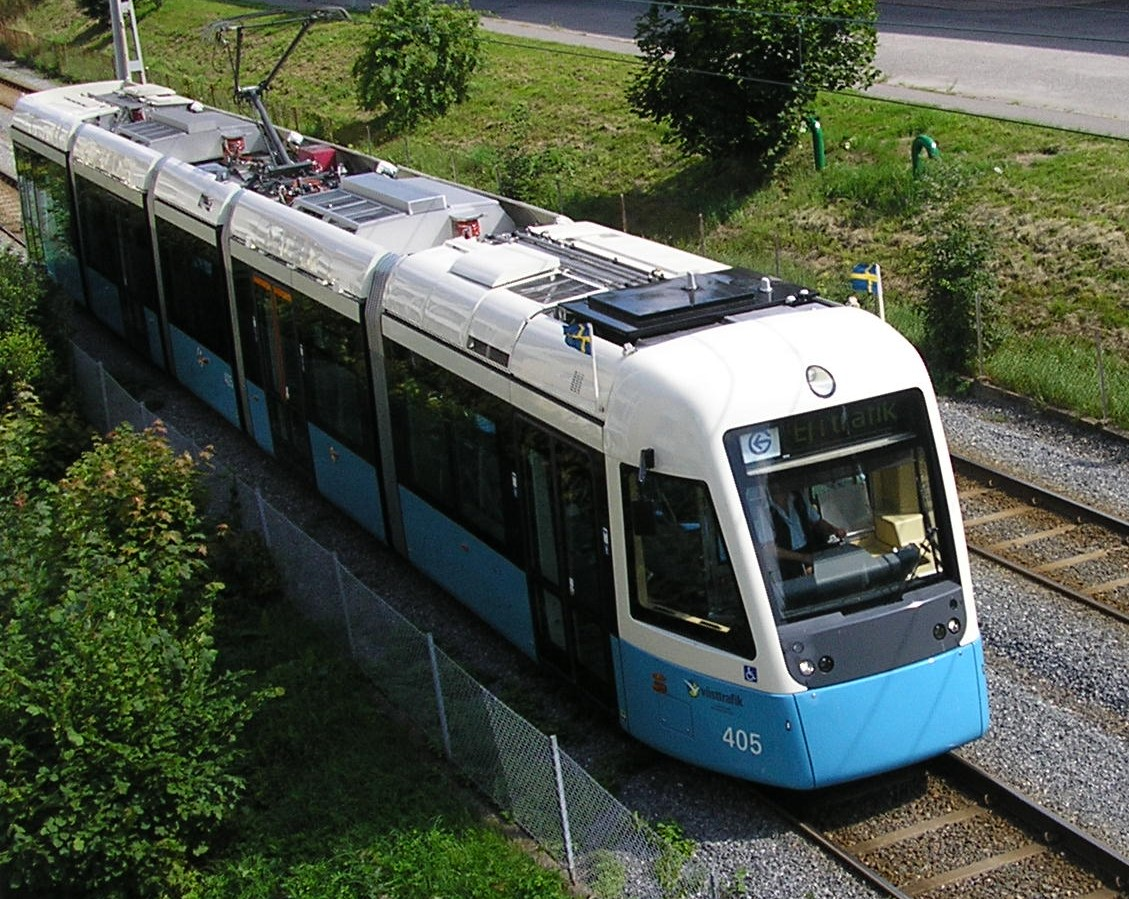
M32 tram out for a test run in August 2006

The city of Gothenburg, Sweden, ordered 40 one-directional Sirio trams, known as the M32 class, which were to be put into service on the Gothenburg tram network during 2005 and onwards. The trams were delivered late and functioned poorly when put into traffic. Among reported problems were excessive track damage caused by the trams, malfunctioning air conditioners inside the trams, and poor ride quality. The City of Gothenburg therefore withheld a large part of the payment for a delivered tram until fully operational.

On December 3, 2009, the city authorities exercised their option for a further 25 trams of the same design at a cost of €61 million.

In February 2013, 38 out of the total 40 trams delivered in the first series were taken out of service due to extensive corrosion on the chassis. Repairing the rusted chassis and moldy passenger floors is expected to be completed by 2017, at a cost of an extra €10 million for the Gothenburg council, according to the revised contract, though Ansaldobreda bears the majority of the cost for these deficiencies. .

Due to further delays on the part of Ansaldobreda with corrosion repairs and substandard quality in completed works, the council of Gothenburg cancelled the contract for corrosion repairs in November 2015. The investigation launched into the matter found, that the trams were jerry-built, . It was also discovered, that the badly built trams have resulted in extensive track damage that will be very costly to repair, adding to the "fiasco" of the Gothenburg Ansaldobreda tram affair.

In August 2017, an arbitration outside the courts awarded Gothenburg municipality 12 million euro in damages. The municipality was to compensate Ansaldobreda for a breach of contract as the municipality had annulled the contract on the grounds of late delivery of often faulty trams, while Ansaldobreda was to compensate the municipality for their extra expenses and the inability of the trams deliver the promised logistic capacity.

=== Greece ===
==== Athens ====
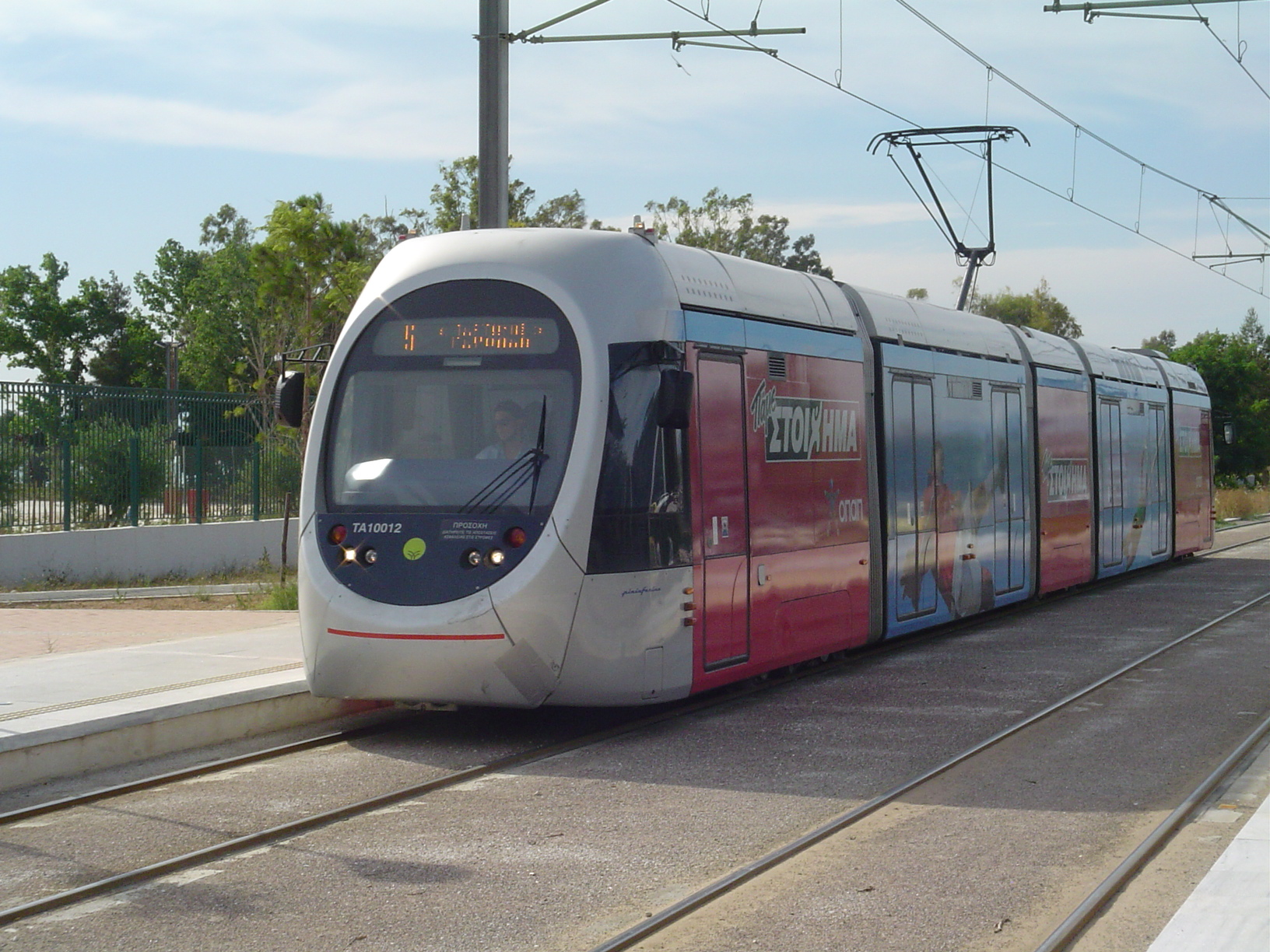
A Sirio in Athens.

Athens Tram operates a fleet of 35 bi-directional Sirio vehicles, styled by Pininfarina.

=== Turkey ===
==== Samsun ====
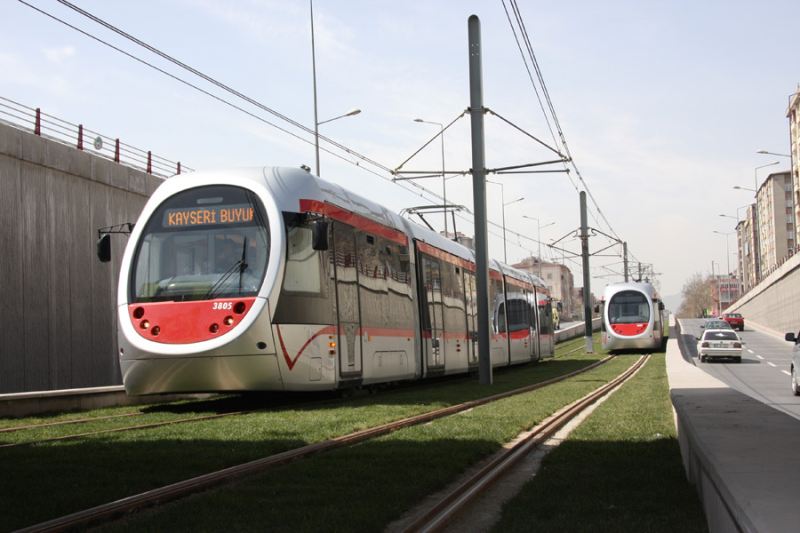
AnsaldoBreda Sirio tram in Kayseri.

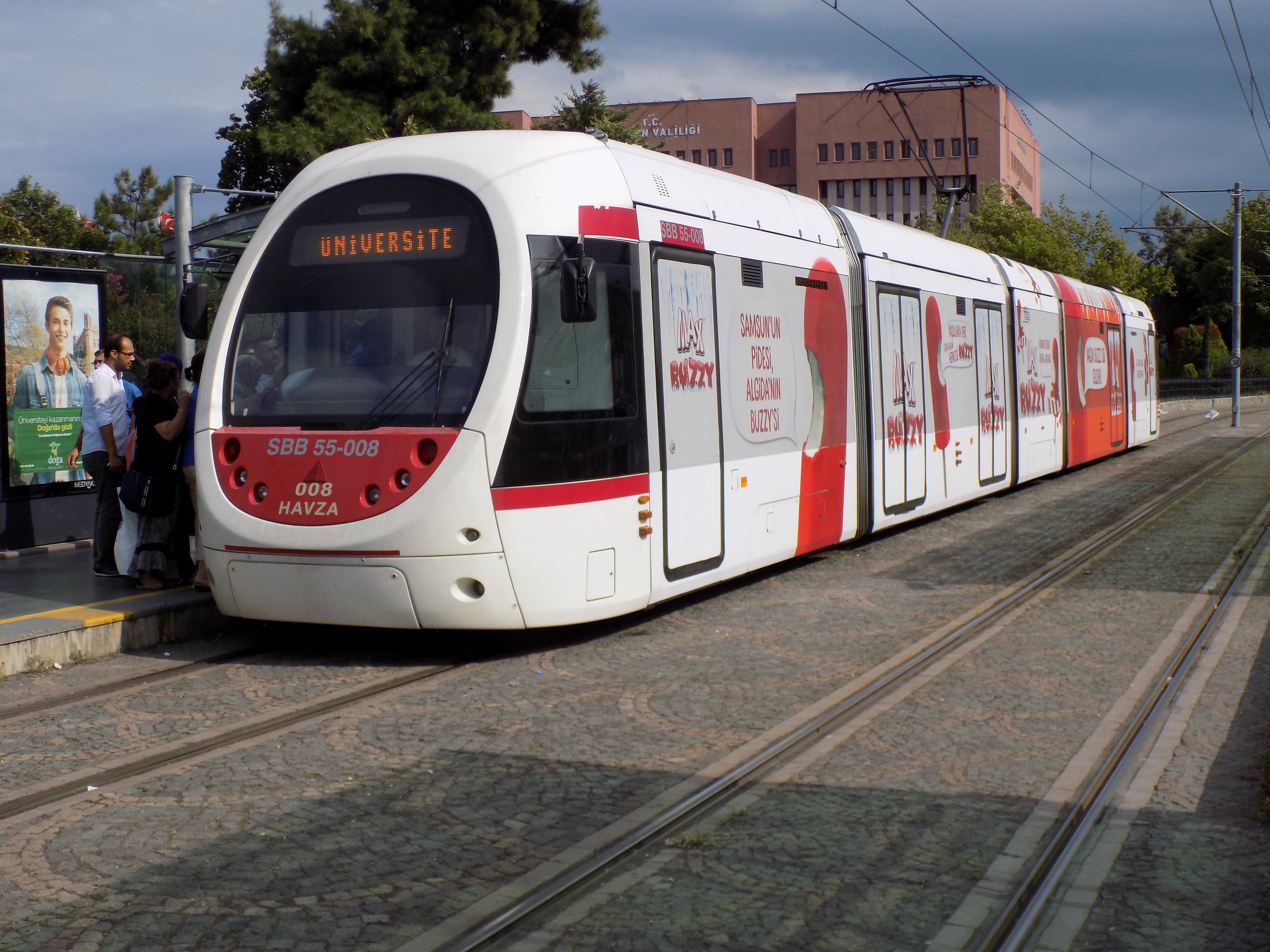
AnsaldoBreda Sirio in Samsun

The Samsun Tram uses 16 trams.

==== Kayseri ====
80 trams are utilized. Operated by Kayseray. It has a network of 46 kilometers, 75 stations, and 4 lines.

=== China ===
==== Zhuhai ====
Zhuhai Tram Line 1, opening November 2014, trams built by CRRC Dalian.

==== Beijing ====
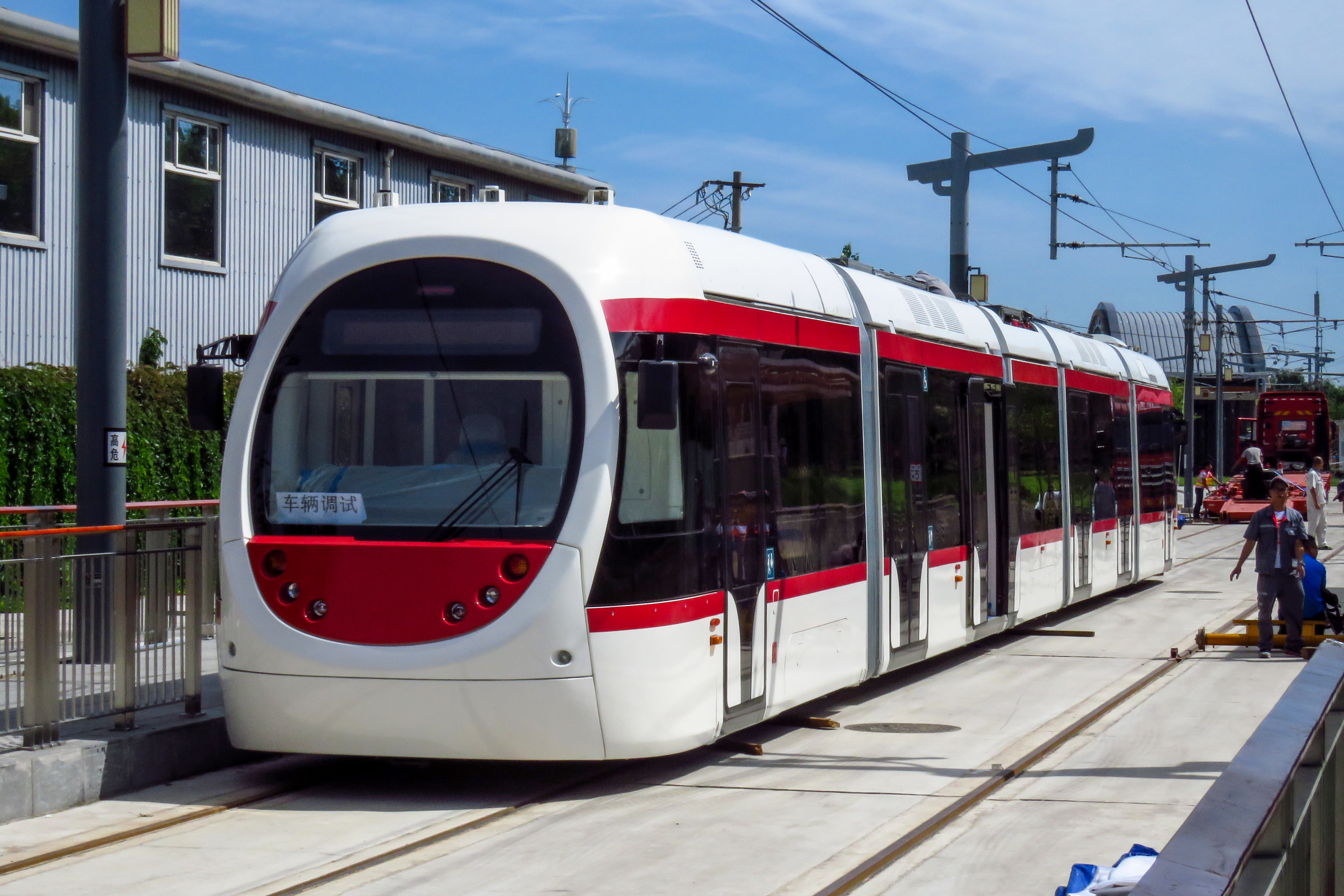
A Sirio built by CRRC Dalian at Chapeng Station, Xijiao line, Beijing

Xijiao line, trams built by CRRC Dalian.
