= Dwight H. Perkins =

Dwight H. Perkins may refer to:

- Dwight H. Perkins (architect) (1867–1941), American architect and planner
- Dwight H. Perkins (economist) (born 1934), American economist
