= Welfare, Choice and Solidarity in Transition =

Welfare, Choice and Solidarity in Transition: reforming the health sector in Eastern Europe was written by János Kornai and Karen Eggleston, published in 2001.

This book focused on ten post-socialist Eastern European countries, including Albania, Bulgaria, Croatia, Czech Republic, Hungary, Republic of Macedonia, Poland, Romania, Slovakia, and Slovenia.

In 2007, (according to the definition of the World Bank) in these ten countries, Albania is a lower-middle-income economy; the Czech Republic and Slovenia are high-income economies; and others belong to upper-middle-income economies.

== See also ==
- János Kornai
- Healthcare system reform in the People's Republic of China

Kornai, János; Karen Eggleston (2001). Welfare, Choice and Solidarity in Transition. Cambridge University Press. ISBN 0-521-79036-0.
