= Institutional Genes: Origins of China's Institutions and Totalitarianism =

Institutional Genes: Origins of China's Institutions and Totalitarianism is a 2025 book by Chinese-American economist and political scientist Chenggang Xu(許成鋼), a senior research scholar at Stanford University's Freeman Spogli Institute for International Studies. Published by Cambridge University Press, the work introduces the concept of "institutional genes" (IGs) — fundamental, self-replicating institutional elements — to explain the historical origins and persistence of communist totalitarianism in China. Xu argues that the fusion of Soviet Russian institutional genes with China's imperial traditions created a unique system he terms "Regionally Administered Totalitarianism" (RADT), which has shaped China's political trajectory from the imperial era through the Communist Revolution, Maoist campaigns, and post-Mao reforms.

The book builds on Xu's decades of research in institutional economics and draws on comparative historical analysis, contrasting China's path with Japan, Russia, and Western constitutional developments. A Chinese-language edition was published in November 2024 by National Taiwan University Press as part of the NTU & HYI Academic Book Series.

== Background and content ==
Xu, who lived through the Cultural Revolution as a sent-down youth, uses the "institutional genes" framework to analyze path dependence in institutions. Key elements include centralized power structures, imperial monopoly on property rights, bureaucratic personnel systems (such as the imperial examination), and ideological consensus. The book traces how these merged with Bolshevik-style totalitarianism imported from Soviet Russia, enabling rapid industrialization and economic growth under reforms while resisting democratization.

Chapters examine the rise of totalitarian ideology in Europe, its adaptation in Russia and China, major historical events like the Great Leap Forward and Cultural Revolution, and the limits of post-Mao economic liberalization. Xu contends that China's current system is not mere authoritarianism but a durable totalitarian regime with Chinese characteristics, and that superficial reforms cannot overcome its encoded institutional DNA.

== Reception ==
Political scientist Minxin Pei, in his February 2026 review "The Totalitarian Gene" for ''China Books Review'', called the work an "instant classic." Pei praised Xu's "theoretical originality and empirical richness," arguing that the book convincingly shows totalitarianism is "institutionally encoded" in China's nation-state and cannot be reformed through gradual changes. He noted that Xu's analysis illuminates why the Chinese Communist Party (CCP) is "not a garden-variety dictatorship" and stated that "history is on his(xu) side."

Andrew J. Nathan highlighted Xu's "sweeping comparative and historical analysis" of China's political institutions and the "institutional genes" metaphor, which underscores their resistance to change and potential for economic stagnation. While acknowledging the book's challenge to assumptions about CCP stability, Nathan critiqued the framework for not fully explaining why institutions "cannot be reformed," suggesting a post-CCP regime might prove even more unstable for the West.

Li-Hsuan Cheng (鄭力軒), Professor of Sociology at National Chengchi University recommended the book to Taiwanese readers, noting its strong rebuttal to the long-held illusion that economic liberalization would naturally lead to political reform, and its warning that China not only lacks the institutional genes for constitutional democracy but is actively attempting to erode those of Taiwan through influence operations on media, campuses, judiciary, and elections. Cheng concluded that the book is “a good book worth reading by everyone in Taiwan today,” both for comprehending the limits of China’s system and for vigilance toward preserving Taiwan’s own democratic institutional foundations.
