= Mehrdad Vahabi =

Iranian economist

- Born: June 19, 1963 (age 63)

Academic background
- Education: University of Chicago, University of Paris
- Theses: Les modes de coordination et les institutions: vers une approche dynamique (1997); La pensée économique de János Kornai (1955-1984) : de la réforme de l'économie socialiste à la théorie de l'économie de pénurie (1993)
- Doctoral advisor: Wladimir Andreff, Bernard Chavance
- Influences: Janos Kornai, Karl Polanyi, Jean-Baptiste Say, Max Weber

Academic work
- School or tradition: New Institutional Economics
- Institutions: Sorbonne Paris North University, French National Centre for Scientific Research، University Paris 8
- Website: https://cepn.univ-paris13.fr/mehrdad-vahabi-2/

Mehrdad Vahabi (Persian: مهرداد وهابی; born 1963) is an Iranian professor of Economics at Université Sorbonne Paris Nord (Paris) and director of Centre d'Economie Paris Nord-CEPN.

== Biography ==
Vahabi was born in 1963 in Tehran. He completed his higher education first in the United States and then in France. In 1981 he received his Bachelor from University of Chicago, and then in October 1993 he received his PhD in Economics from Paris 7 University on La pensée économique de János Kornai (1955-1984) : de la réforme de l'économie socialiste à la théorie de l'économie de pénurie. After that he received his Habilitation à Diriger des Recherches (HDR) from Université Paris 1 on Les modes de coordination et les institutions: vers une approche dynamique. He is currently a professor of Economics in Sorbonne Paris North University (Paris 13) and the director of Centre d'Economie Paris Nord-CEPN, an affiliation of French National Centre for Scientific Research.

== Works ==
In his book The Political Economy of Predation (2016), which stands at the crossroad of Public Choice and New institutional Economics, Vahabi relies on the concept of predation to revisit the analysis of the genesis of the state, states conflict and the transition from autocracy to democracy.

His subsequent work, Destructive Coordination, Anfal and Islamic Political Capitalism: A New Reading of Contemporary Iran (2023), is a study of Islamic public finance that describes how ideology and politics enable institutions to emerge that contribute to perpetual crises. With focus on Iran, and a specific institution, Anfal.

=== Books ===
- Vahabi, Mehrdad (2025). The Legacy of Janos Kornai: Collected Economic Essays on Janos Kornai. Palgrave Macmillan Cham. ISBN 978-3-031-83239-0.
- Vahabi, Mehrdad (2023). Destructive Coordination, Anfal and Islamic Political Capitalism: A New Reading of Contemporary Iran. Palgrave Macmillan Cham. doi:10.1007/978-3-031-17674-6. ISBN 978-3-031-17676-0.
- Vahabi, Mehrdad (2016). The Political Economy of Predation: Manhunting and the Economics of Escape. Cambridge University Press. doi:10.1017/CBO9781316460139. ISBN 9781316460139.
- Vahabi, Mehrdad (2004). The Political Economy of Destructive Power. Edward Elgar Publishing. doi:10.4337/9781845421724. ISBN 9781845421724.
