= Xijiao line =

Tram line in Beijing, China

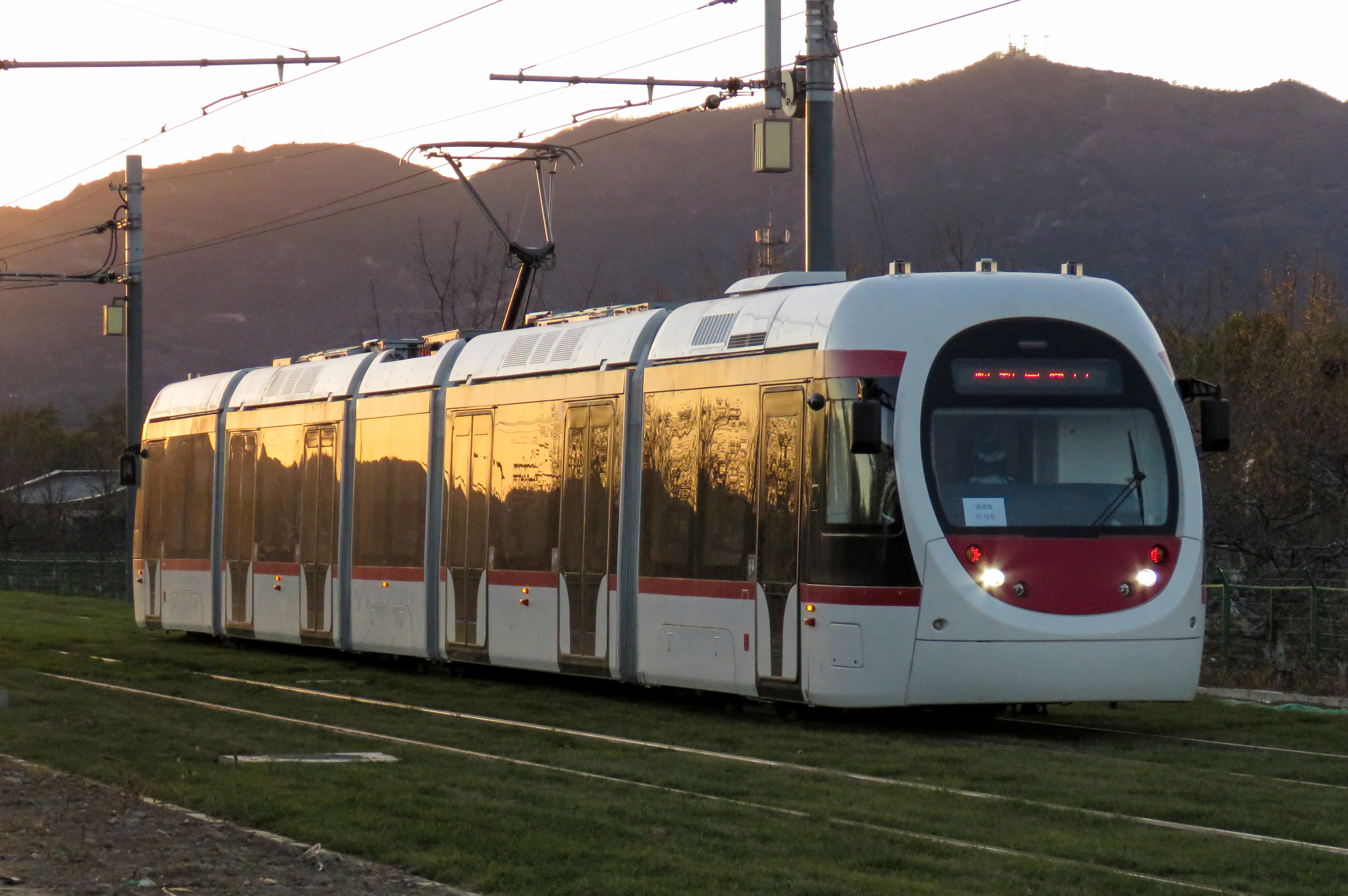
- A Xijiao Line tram approaching Chapeng station

Overview
- Other name(s): Western Suburban Line; Western Suburb Branch Line
- Native name: 西郊线
- Status: Operational
- Locale: Haidian District; Beijing
- Termini: Bagou; Fragrant Hills
- Stations: 6

Service
- Type: Light rail
- System: Beijing Subway
- Operator: Beijing Public Transit Tramway Co., Ltd.
- Depot: Bagou
- Rolling stock: 31 × CRRC Dalian–Hitachi Rail Italy Sirio

History
- Opened: 30 December 2017; 8 years ago

Technical
- Line length: 8.8 km (5.5 mi)
- Character: At-grade, Underground
- Track gauge: 1,435 mm (4 ft 8 1/2 in) standard gauge
- Electrification: 750 V DC overhead catenary
- Operating speed: Maximum: 70 km/h (43 mph) Operational: 20 km/h (12 mph)

Xijiao line
- Traditional Chinese: 西郊線
- Simplified Chinese: 西郊线
- Literal meaning: Western Suburbs Line
Transcriptions
Standard Mandarin
- Hanyu Pinyin: Xījiāo Xiàn

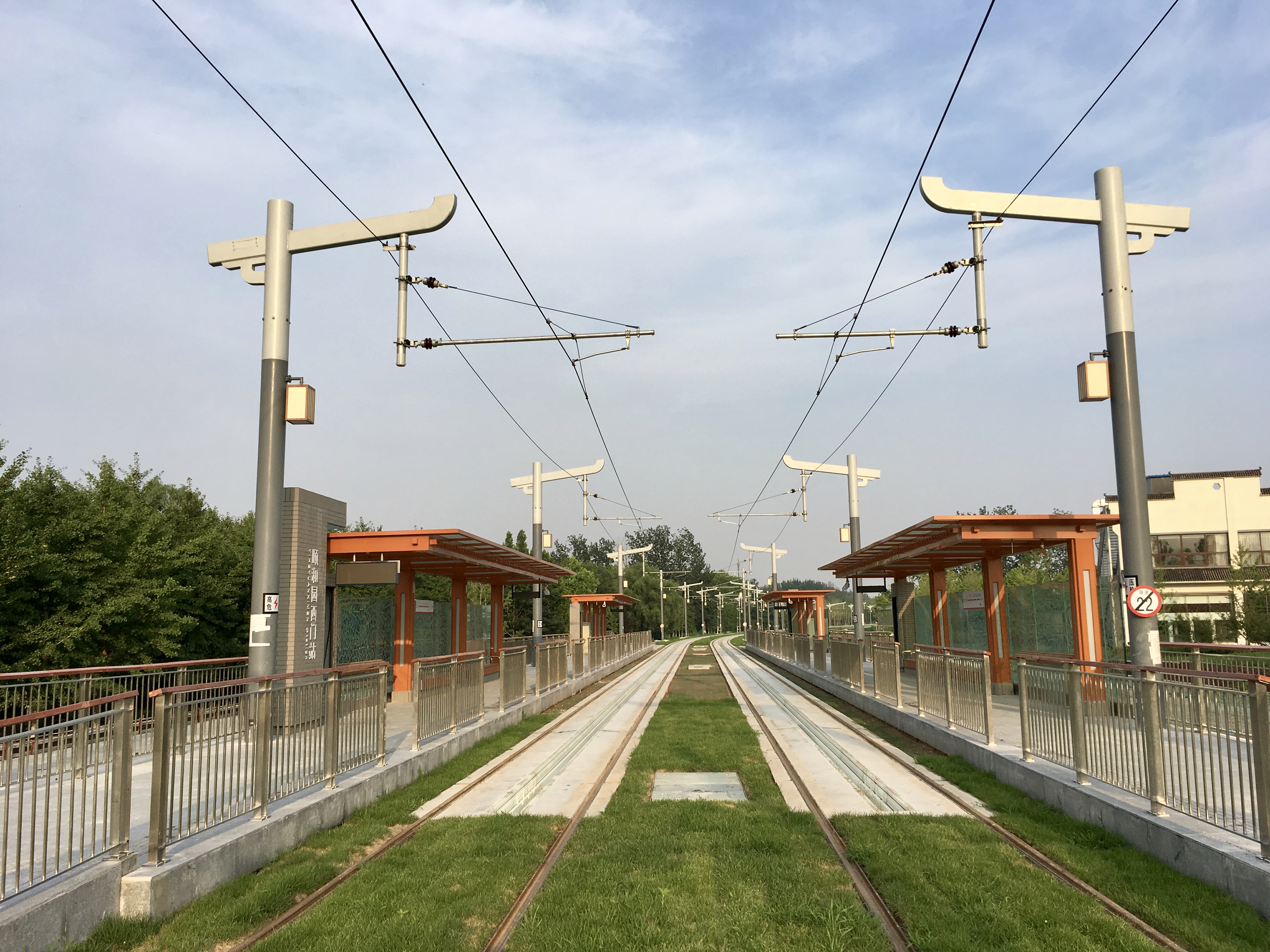
Summer Palace West Gate station platform

The Xijiao Line of the Beijing Subway, also called Line 29 (simplified Chinese: 北京地铁西郊线; traditional Chinese: 北京地鐵西郊線; pinyin: běijīng dìtiě xījiāo xiàn), is a light rail line in Haidian District of Beijing. It runs southeast-northwest from Bagou station on Line 10 to the Fragrant Hills station, marking a total length of 8.8 km (5.47 mi). It entered service on December 30th, 2017. The line is operated by Beijing Public Transit Tramway Co. Ltd. a subsidiary of Beijing Public Transport Holdings, Ltd. which also operates Beijing's Buses.

== Fares ==
The Xijiao Line, despite being situated in the suburbs of Beijing, still constitutes as the city's public transportation; hence, it uses the same fare system as other subway lines. Ticket prices for the first 6 kilometers on the line (inbound up to the Summer Palace West Gate station, outbound up to the Wan'an station) are 3 RMB, though it rises up to 4 RMB for the rest of the route (inbound to the Bagou station, outbound to the Fragrant Hills station).

In-station transfer is, however, not available at the inbound terminus of Bagou. Passengers would need to exit the station after disembarking Line 10, then re-enter to take the Xijiao Line.

== History ==
Starting November 24, 2008, construction websites in Beijing began pitching bids for the construction of the 1st phase of the new Xijiao Line.

At the 15th Capital Urban Planning and Construction Design Conference (December 11, 2008), the Beijing City Planning Committee unveiled plans to construct 4 new subway lines for the suburban Fangshan, Shunyi, and Changping districts. The Committee also announced that they would strive to build two of the four lines by 2010. One of those lines was eventually nominated the Xijiao Line.

On January 6, 2009, the Haidian District government announced that they would begin construction of the Xijiao Line that very year, though engineering details such as the exact route, whether the line would be below grade or above the surface, and the number of stations, were still being decided. By the 15th, the City Planning Committee unveiled the first five stations along the route. By August of the same year, authorities changed plans for the Line, adapting it from a metro to a tourist tram line with an operating speed of 20 km/h (12 mph). The new project planned 9.3 km (5.78 mi) of rail, under a total estimated cost of 1 billion RMB.

The recommencement of construction was set for 2010, but it was not until March 14, 2012, that the new route map and planning program were announced. Actual construction lasted five more years, finishing on October 20, 2017. Trial operations begin afterwards accordingly. By December 30th, the Xijiao Line was ready for use.

== Route ==
All stations are located in Haidian District.

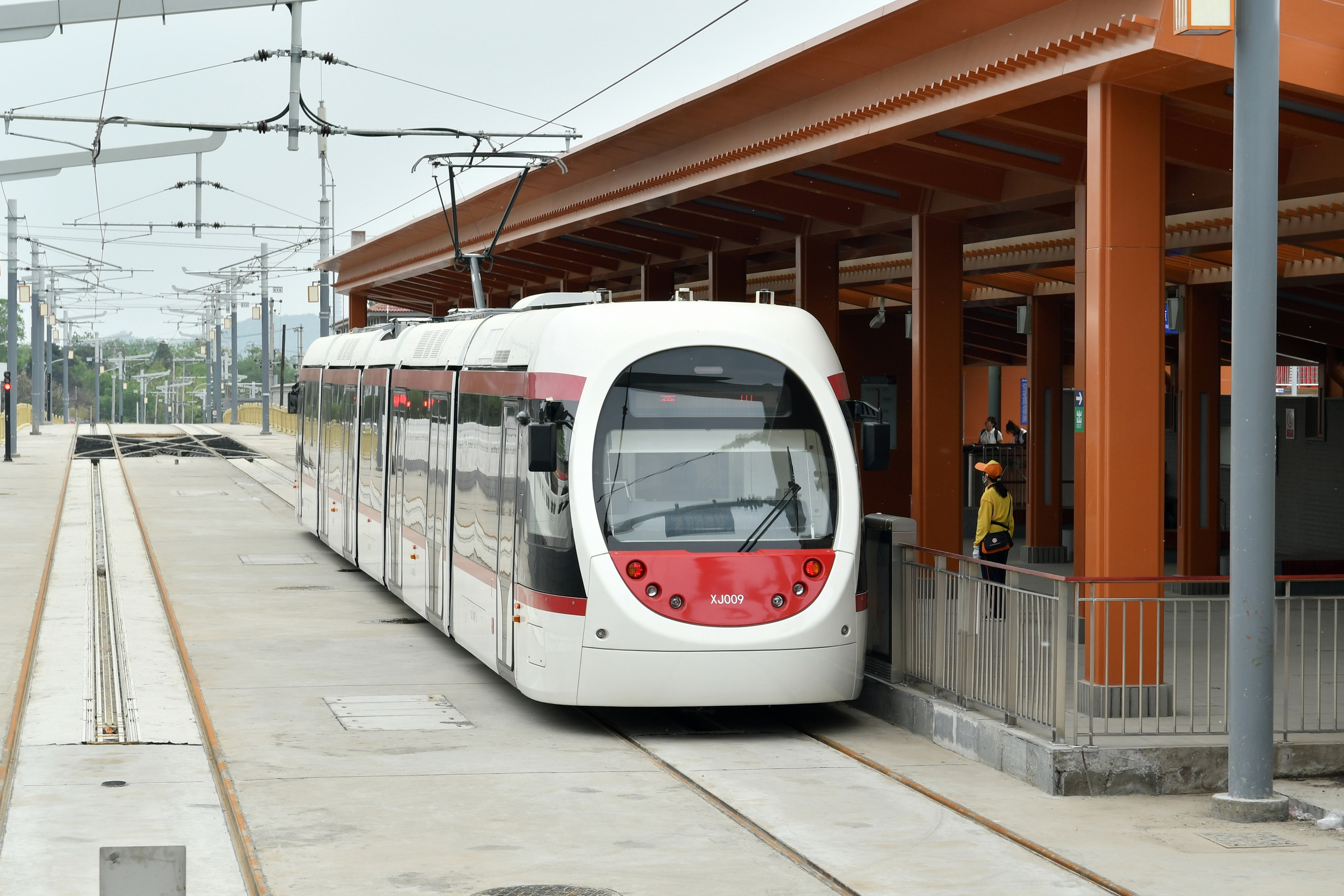
Rolling stock at Fragrant Hills Station

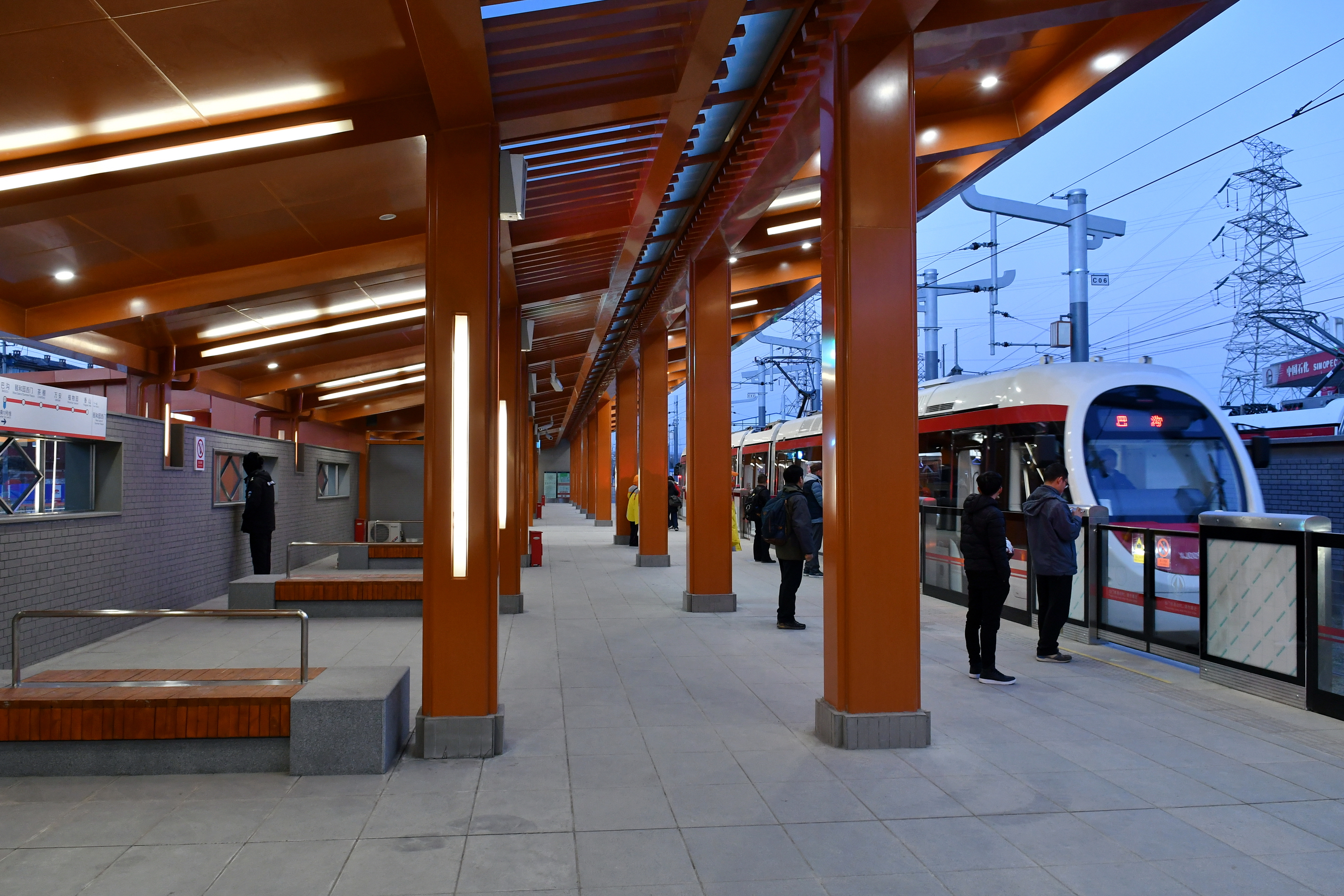
Platform of Bagou Station (Xijiao Line)

Station Name		Connections	Nearby Bus Stops	Distance (in km)	
English	Chinese	Connections	Nearby Bus Stops	Distance (in km)	
Fragrant Hills	香山		318 360 360快 505 563 698 932	0.000	0.000
China National Botanical Garden	国家植物园		318 360 360快 505 563 698 932	0.983	0.983
Wan'an	万安		630	1.733	2.716
Chapeng	茶棚		469 专129	1.550	4.266
Summer Palace West Gate	颐和园西门		469 539 专129	1.505	5.771
Bagou	巴沟	10	74 302 307 361 386 424 534 539 613 614 630 644 快速直达专线26 通医专线6	2.922	8.693

== Rolling stock ==
The line uses 31 low-floor 5-segment Hitachi Sirio trams built on license by CRRC Dalian. Single vehicles are normally used but can be coupled to form two-car trains when necessary.

== Accidents and incidents ==
On 1 January 2018, tram XJ003 derailed after a malfunction when departing from Fragrant Hills station at 2:36 PM with no passengers on board. The tram slid down the tracks with its control lever still at traction position after being lifted back on to the tracks later that day. Xiangshan station stopped service until 1 March 2018.

The involved set XJ003 was taken out of service since the incident and stored in the Bagou Depot.
