= Xiangshan Subdistrict, Beijing =

Xiangshan Subdistrict 香山街道
- Subdistrict
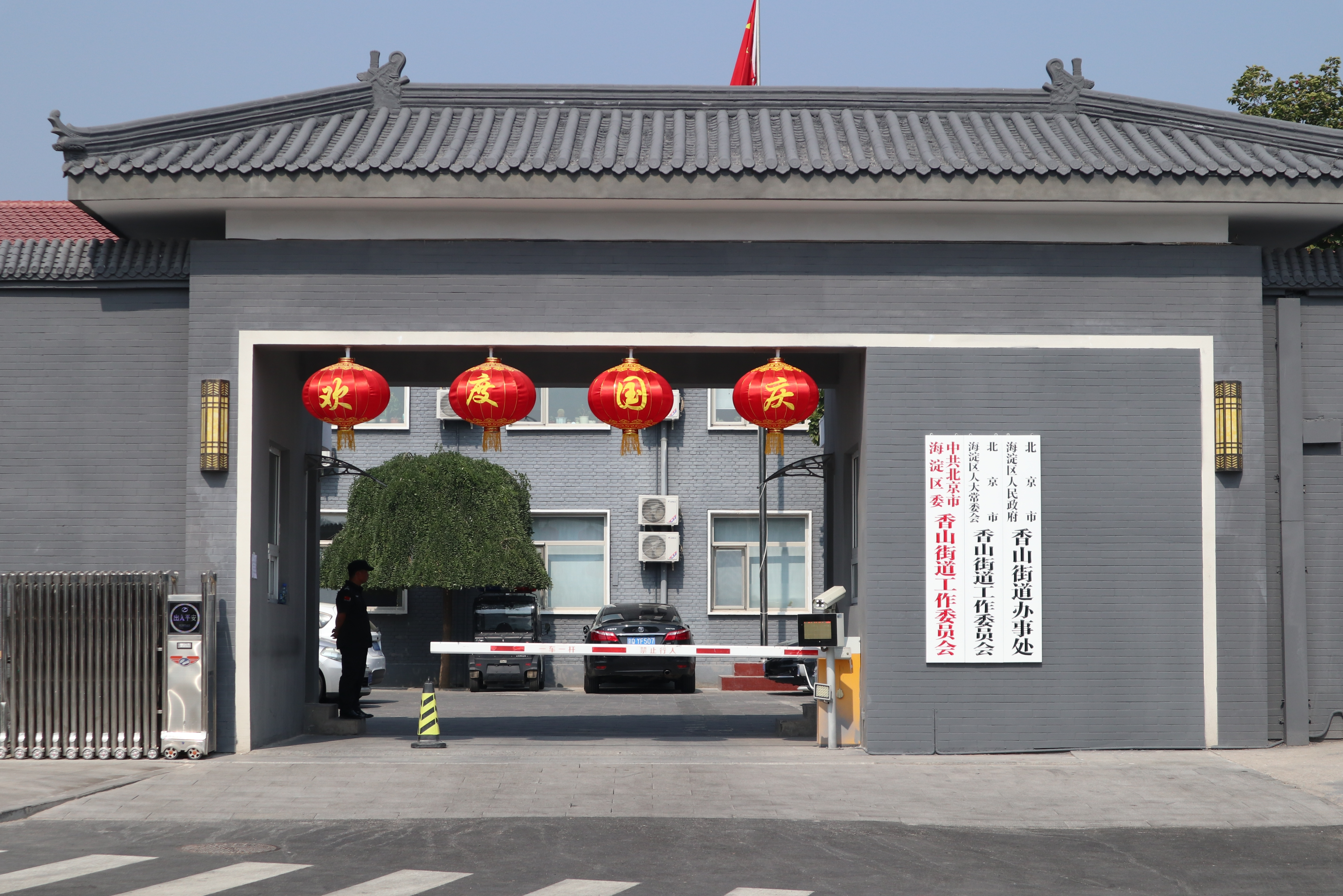
- Government office of Xiangshan Subdistrict, 2019

- Location within Beijing Location within China
- Coordinates: 39°59′34″N 116°12′00″E
- Country: China
- Municipality: Beijing
- District: Haidian
- Village-level Divisions: 6 communities

Area
  - Total: 20.3 km^{2} (7.8 sq mi)

Population (2020)
  - Total: 27,614
  - Density: 1,360/km^{2} (3,520/sq mi)
- Time zone: UTC+8 (China Standard)
- Postal code: 100093
- Area code: 010

Xiangshan Subdistrict (Chinese: 香山街道; pinyin: Xiāngshān Jiēdào) is a subdistrict situated at the western portion of Haidian District, Beijing, China. It borders Wenquan and Xibeiwan Towns in its north, Qinglongqiao Subdistrict in its east, Sijiqing Town and Wulituo Subdistrict in its south, and Junzhuang Town in its west. In 2020, it had 27,614 inhabitants under its administration.

This subdistrict got its name from Xiangshan (Fragrant Hills) (Chinese: 香山; pinyin: Xiāngshān) in the subdistrict. The name derives from the highest peak of Fragrant Hills, Xianglu Feng (Incense Burner Peak), a 557-meter (1,827 ft) hill with two large stones resembling incense burners at the top.

== History ==
Timetable of Xiangshan Subdistrict
Year	Status	
1949	Split into northern and southern portions. Northern part formed into a township in early 1949	Split into northern and southern portions. Southern part formed into a township in late 1949
1953	Transformed into Xiangshan Nonglinmu Production Cooperative	Transformed into Yuxiang Cooperative
1956	Combined into Xiangshan Cooperative	
1958	Incorporated into Mentoucun Work Station, under Sijiqing People's Commune	
1960	Formed Xiangshan Production Team, still under Sijiqing	
1985	Separated from Sijiqing and formed Xiangshan Subdistrict	
2005	Two communities, Mentoucun and Jushan Jiayuan, were transferred to Sijiqing Town	

== Administrative Divisions ==
As of 2021, there were 6 residential communities in Xiangshan Subdistrict:

Administrative division code	Subdivision names	Name transliteration
110108016001	香山第一	Xiangshan Diyi
110108016002	香山第二	Xiangshan Di'er
110108016003	四王府	Siwangfu
110108016005	六号院	Liuhaoyuan
110108016006	北炮	Beipao
110108016008	南植	Nanzhi

== Transport ==
- Fragrant Hills station
- China National Botanical Garden station

== See also ==
- List of township-level divisions of Beijing
