= János Kornai =

Hungarian economist (1928–2021)

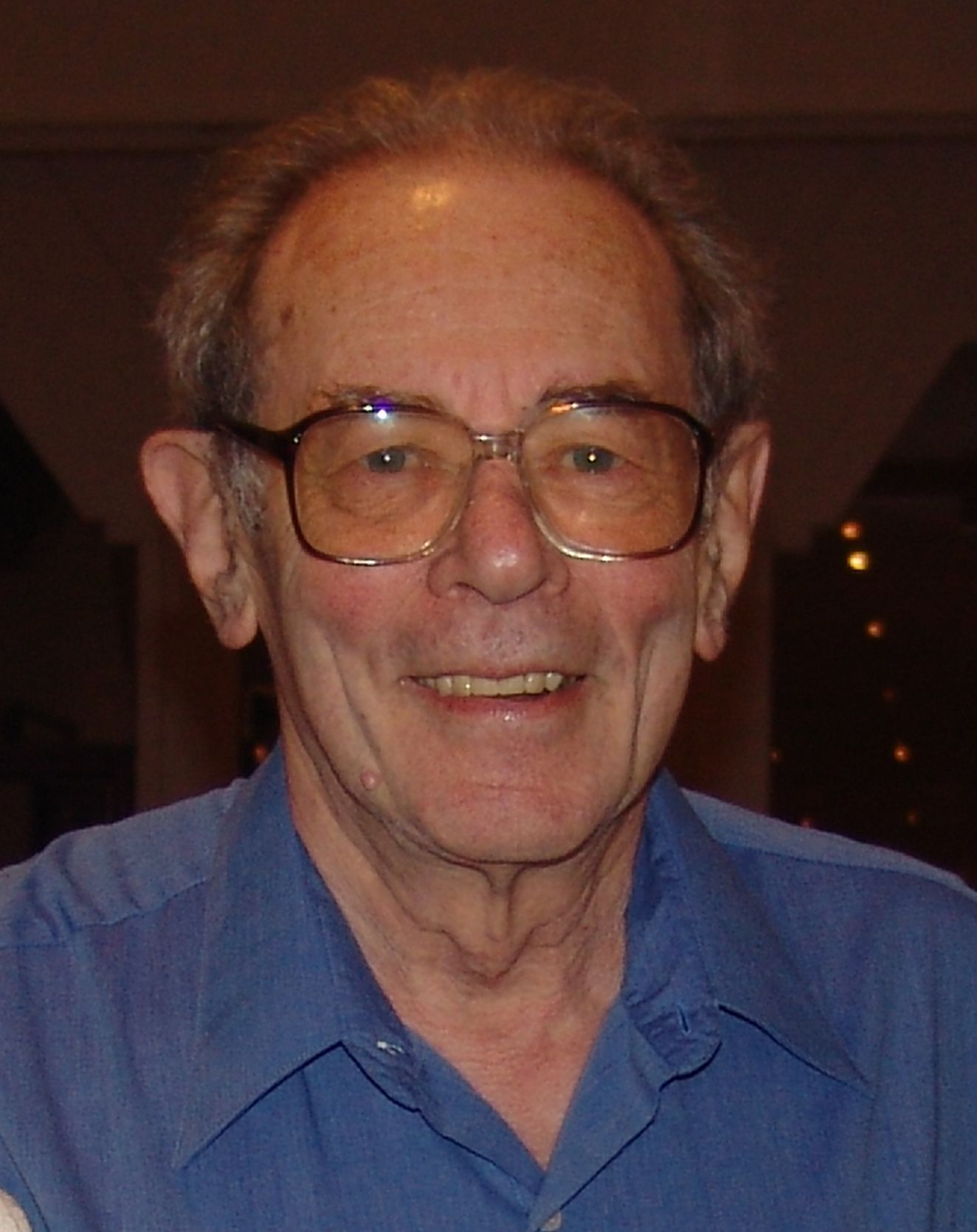
- Kornai in 2005
- Born: János Kornhauser; 21 January 1928; Budapest, Hungary
- Died: 18 October 2021 (aged 93); Budapest, Hungary
- Spouse: Teréz Laky (m. 1952; died 2005)
- Children: András Kornai

Academic background
- Influences: Mehrdad Vahabi, Chenggang Xu

Academic work
- School or tradition: Institutional economics
- Notable ideas: Theory of two-level planning Shortage economy
- Website: Information at IDEAS / RePEc

János Kornai (21 January 1928 – 18 October 2021) was a Hungarian economist noted for his analysis and criticism of the command economies of Eastern European communist states. He also covered macroeconomic aspects in countries undergoing post-Soviet transition. He was emeritus professor at both Harvard University and Corvinus University of Budapest. Kornai was known to have coined the term shortage economy to reflect perpetual shortages of goods in the centrally-planned command economies of the Eastern Bloc.

== Biography ==
Kornai was born János Kornhauser on 21 January 1928 in Budapest in a well-to-do Hungarian-Jewish family. The family spent time in an internment camp during the Nazi occupation of Hungary. His father was sent for slave labour and later killed at Auschwitz. Kornai studied philosophy for two years at Pázmány Péter University (now Eötvös Loránd University) in Budapest.

Kornai gained his knowledge of economics on his own, and later held a candidate degree in the field from the Hungarian Academy of Sciences. He wrote that he chose to be an economist after reading Marx's Das Kapital. He started working on Szabad Nép, the Hungarian Communist Party newspaper, and rose to be editor for news related to the economy, but he was fired for lack of Communist convictions in April 1955.

From 1958 onwards, Kornai received many invitations to visit foreign institutions, but was denied a passport by the Hungarian authorities and forbidden to travel until 1963, after political restrictions had begun to ease.

From 1967 to 1992, Kornai was a research professor at the Institute of Economics, Hungarian Academy of Sciences. He became a corresponding member (1976), then a full member (1982) of the Hungarian Academy of Sciences. Kornai joined the faculty of Harvard University in Cambridge, Massachusetts, in 1986 and was named the Allie S. Freed Professor of Economics in 1992.

Retiring from Harvard in 2002, he remained a Distinguished Research Professor at Central European University, and later became a Professor Emeritus at Corvinus University of Budapest. He was a member of the board of the Hungarian National Bank (central bank) until 2001. In 2018, the Corvinus University of Budapest organized a full-day conference in honour of his 90th birthday. In 2018, he was elected an honorary member of the Széchenyi Academy of Literature and Art.

János Kornai died on 18 October 2021 in Budapest, aged 93.

== Work ==
In the late 1950s, he was among those who initiated the use of mathematical methods in economic planning. He elaborated the theory of two-level planning with Tamás Lipták and directed the first large-scale, economy-wide, multi-level planning project. Professor Kornai's early work Overcentralization (1956) created a stir in the West and conveyed for the first time his disillusionment with communist central planning.

His 1971 book Anti-Equilibrium criticizes neoclassical economics, particularly general equilibrium theory. His 1980 book Economics of Shortage is perhaps his most influential work. It argues that the chronic shortages seen throughout Eastern Europe in the late 1970s and continuing in the 1980s were not the consequences of planners' errors or wrong pricing, but of systemic flaws. In his 1988 book The Socialist System, The Political Economy of Communism, he argued that the command economy based on unchallenged control by a Marxist–Leninist communist party leads to a predominance of bureaucratic administration of state firms, through centralized planning and management, and the use of administrative pricing to eliminate the effects of the market. This brings individual responses to the incentives of the system, culminating in observable and inescapable economic phenomena known as the shortage economy. Kornai remained highly sceptical of efforts to create market socialism. His later works, including The Road to a Free Economy (1990), Highway and Byways (1995), Struggle and Hope (1997) and Welfare in Transition (2001), deal with macroeconomic aspects and the interaction between politics and economic policy in the period of economic transition in Eastern Europe. He later led a comprehensive research project, Honesty and Trust in the Light of Post-Socialist Transition at Collegium Budapest.

Kornai was a member of the Royal Swedish Academy of Sciences. In 2016 he was elected as a foreign associate of the National Academy of Sciences.

In 2007 Kornai published a book of memoirs, By Force of Thought, covering his research and the social and political environments in which he did his work. New editions of some of Kornai's major works appeared in Hungarian from a Bratislava publisher in 2012.

== See also ==
- Welfare, Choice and Solidarity in Transition
- Anti-equilibrium theory
- Stanisław Gomułka
- Socialist economies in theory
- Shortage economy
