= Dwight H. Perkins (economist) =

Academic, economist, sinologist (born 1934)

Dwight Heald Perkins II (born in Chicago, Illinois, in 1934) is an American academic, economist, sinologist, and professor at Harvard University.

== Early life and education ==
Dwight Perkins was born to architect Lawrence Bradford Perkins and Margery Blair Perkins. Perkins graduated from Evanston Township High School in 1952 and later attended Cornell University, earning an undergraduate degree in 1956, where he began studying China and the Chinese language. Following graduation and two years of service in the US Navy, Perkins resumed his studies as a graduate student at Harvard, earning a degree in economics in 1961 and a Ph.D in economics in 1964.

His doctoral thesis was Price Formation in Communist China, and his academic interests focused on socialist China, primarily on four topics:

- China's economy under socialist planning (1949–1976).
- Quantitative and political economic history of China.
- The transition from socialist planning to a hybrid system.
- The post-1978 growth spurt.

Perkins' academic study and naval background later made him of interest in China's transforming economy (and other nations) in the late 20th century.

== Academic career ==
Perkins began his academic career at Harvard University as a graduate student and continued teaching there until 2006. He later served as a research professor and became professor emeritus. Perkins was a faculty member in the Department of Economics within the Faculty of Arts and Sciences and also served at Harvard's Kennedy School of Government.

He was a Phi Beta Kappa Visiting Scholar in 1992–1993. Throughout his career, he authored 25 books and published more than 150 articles on economic development, with a focus on the economic history and development of China, Korea, and Southeast Asia.

== Economic advisory and planning career ==
He first visited China in 1974 as a consultant to the Permanent Subcommittee on Investigations of the U.S. Senate, accompanying Senator Henry M. Jackson. He joined Jackson on additional trips to China in 1978 and 1979, meeting with Deng Xiaoping and other senior officials. In 1975, he led a delegation from the Committee on Scholarly Communications with the People's Republic of China (CSCPRC) to study rural industry. In 1979, he participated in the first CSCPRC economics delegation to China. He has made over 80 trips to China, lectured at various universities, and was named an honorary professor/researcher at the Shanghai Academy of Social Sciences and the Central China University of Science and Technology. He received the Chang Peigang Award in 2010 for contributions to development economics and was the first Cornelius Van der Starr Distinguished Fellow of the China Development Research Foundation in 2008 - 2009.

In 1975–1976, Perkins served as acting director of Harvard's Fairbank Center for East Asian Research. A year later, he became chairman of the department of economics at Harvard University, and from 1980 through 1995, he served as director of the Harvard Institute for International Development (HIID). Later, he also became director of Harvard's Asia Center (ref Who's Who in America,1994, p. 2684, "cv"). During his tenure as director of HIID, the Institute had resident advisors on macroeconomics, government management and legal reform, environmental regulation, maternal and child health, and education in the relevant ministries in 27 countries in Asia, Africa, Latin America, and Eastern Europe (Dwight H. Perkins, Richard Pagett, Michael Roemer, Donald Snodgrass, and Joseph Stern, Assisting Development in a Changing World: The Harvard Institute for International Development, 1980-1995 (Cambridge: Harvard University Press, 1997); and HIID biannual reports.

Prior to becoming director, Perkins served as an advisor to the Economic Planning Unit of the Government of Malaysia in 1968-69 and later led a team advising the Malaysian government on civil service reform (2004–2007). In 1972, he served as an advisor to the Korea Development Institute (KDI) in Seoul during its first year and subsequently worked with KDI to jointly manage and help write research, which produced more than fifteen books on the Korean economy and society, five of which he co-authored.

In 1989, he led a team to Vietnam to explore working with the Vietnamese government on its transition from a command to a market economy and continued to lecture in Vietnam and work with the government on market reforms in subsequent years. In 1995, as part of that effort, together with Thomas Vallely of HIID and others, he helped establish the Fulbright Economic Teaching Program in Ho Chi Minh City, a year-long program of economics training for government officials and private economics personnel. He then taught two semesters in that program (1997–98) and lectured and oversaw the program until 2009, first through HIID and subsequently via the Kennedy School (Assisting Development in a Changing World, and various issues of The Fulbright Economics Teaching Program: Guide to Programs and Courses).

He served on an advisory committee to the Prime Minister of Papua New Guinea in 1991–92, was inducted into the American Philosophical Society in 2002 and was a member of the International Advisory Group of the Privatization Commission and Prime Minister of Papua New Guinea in 2000–2002.(cv).

== Personal life ==
Perkins is the grandson of Dwight Heald Perkins. He married Julie Rate Perkins in 1957, and they have three children.

== Selected works ==
In a statistical overview derived from writings by and about Dwight H. Perkins, the OCLC/WorldCat database encompasses roughly 100 works in over 250 publications in 7 languages and is held by 6,900+ libraries.

- Market Control and Planning in Communist China (1966)
- China, Asia's Next Economic Giant (1986)
- Agricultural Development in China, 1368-1968 (1969)
- China's Modern Economy in Historical Perspective: sponsored by the Social Science Research Council (1975)
- Rural Development in China (1984)
- Reforming Economic Systems in Developing Countries (1991)
- The Economics of Development (1st edition 1983, 7th edition 2013)
- East Asian Development. Harvard University Press. 2013. ISBN 9780674725300.
- Perkins, Dwight H. (2015). The Economic Transformation of China. World Scientific Publishing. doi:10.1142/9201. ISBN 978-981-4612-37-1.
- "A 'Hard Landing' or Secular Stagnation in China's Future: False Alarm or Real Threat?" China Economic Review, October 2019.
- "Structural Challenges to Sustained Economic Growth in China" China and World Economy, January–February 2023.
