= Bagou station =

Beijing Subway interchange station

Bagou 巴沟
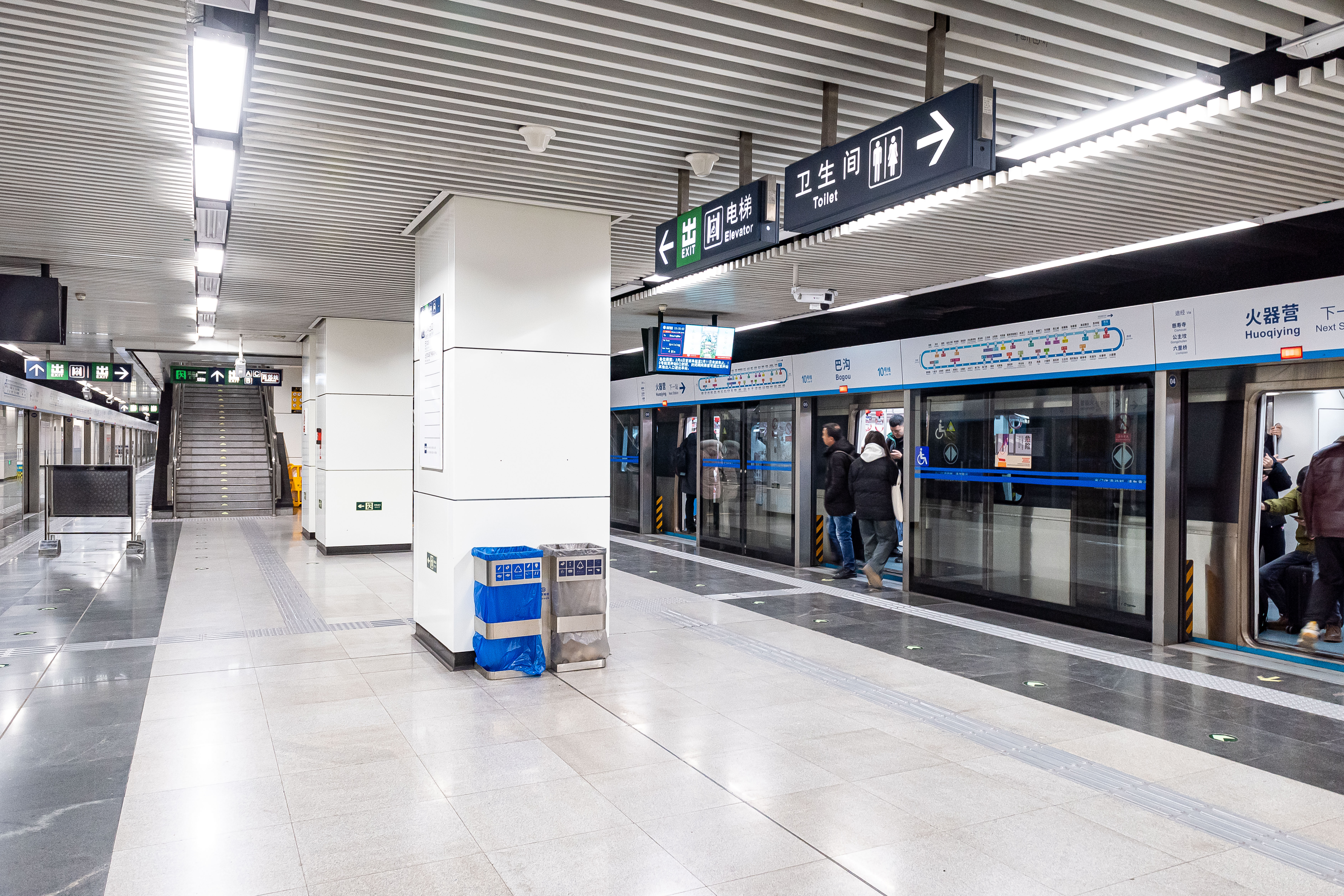
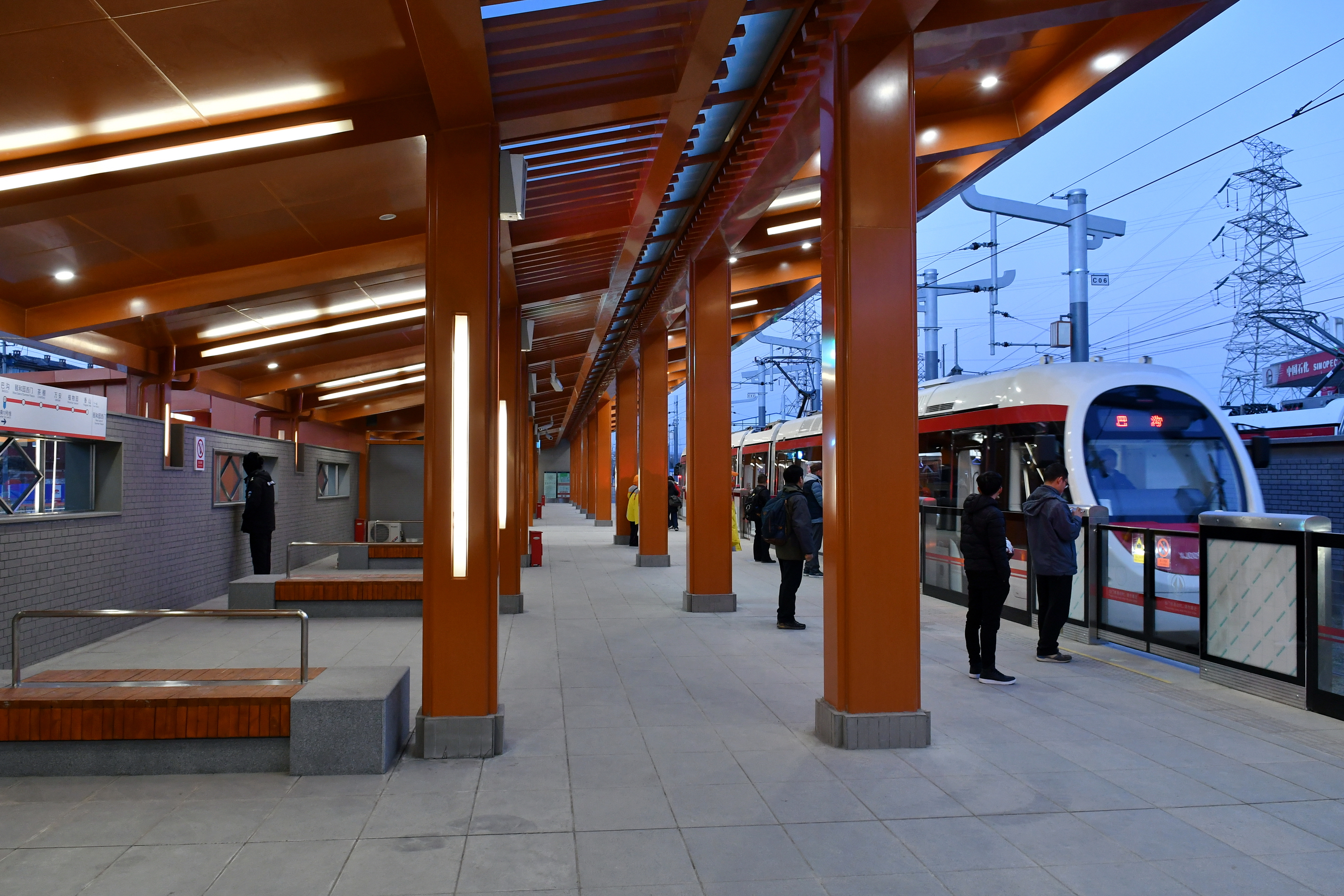
- Line 10 counter-clockwise platform Xijiao Line platform

General information
- Location: Bagou Road; Haidian District, Beijing; China
- Coordinates: 39.974179°N 116.293727°E
- Operator: Beijing Mass Transit Railway Operation Corporation Limited (Line 10); Beijing Public Transit Tramway Corporation Limited (Xijiao line)
- Lines: Line 10; Xijiao line
- Platforms: 5 (2 island platforms for Line 10, 1 side platform for Xijiao line)
- Tracks: 5

Construction
- Structure type: Underground (Line 10); At-grade (Xijiao line)
- Accessible: Yes

History
- Opened: July 19, 2008; 18 years ago (Line 10); December 30, 2017; 8 years ago (Xijiao line)

Services
Preceding station	Beijing Subway	Following station
Huoqiying outer loop / anticlockwise	Line 10	Suzhou Jie inner loop / clockwise
Summer Palace West Gate towards Fragrant Hills	Xijiao line	Terminus
Location
- Location within Beijing

Bagou station (simplified Chinese: 巴沟站; traditional Chinese: 巴溝站; pinyin: Bāgōu zhàn) is a station on Line 10 and Xijiao line (light rail) of the Beijing Subway. It opened July 19, 2008. It was the northwestern terminus of Line 10 until phase two of expansion completed the Line 10 loop.

== Station layout ==
The Line 10 station has underground dual-island platforms. The Xijiao line station has a single-sided platform.

== Exits ==
There are 5 exits, lettered A, B, C1, C2, and C3. Exits A and B are accessible.

== Gallery ==
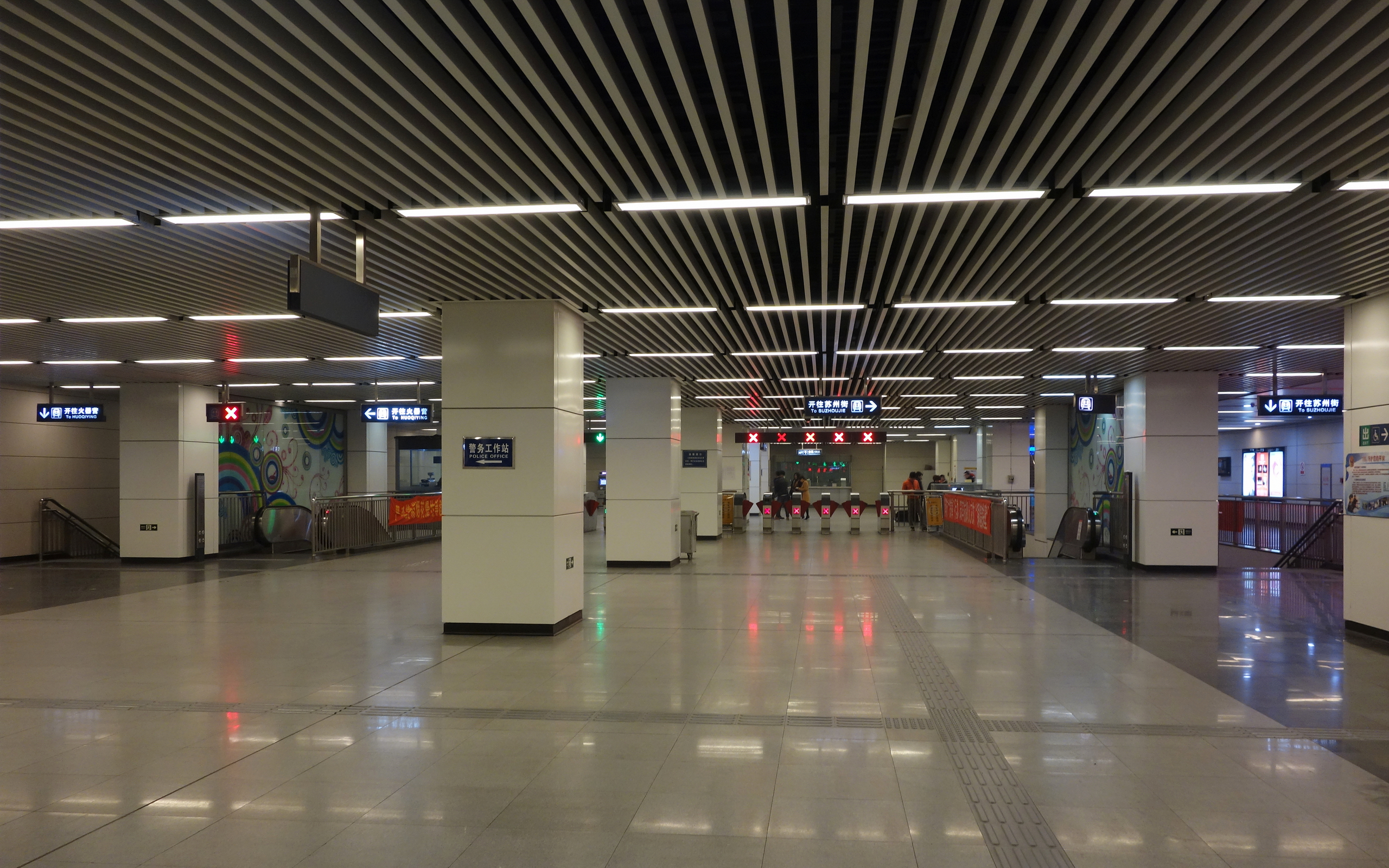
Line 10 concourse (February 2014)

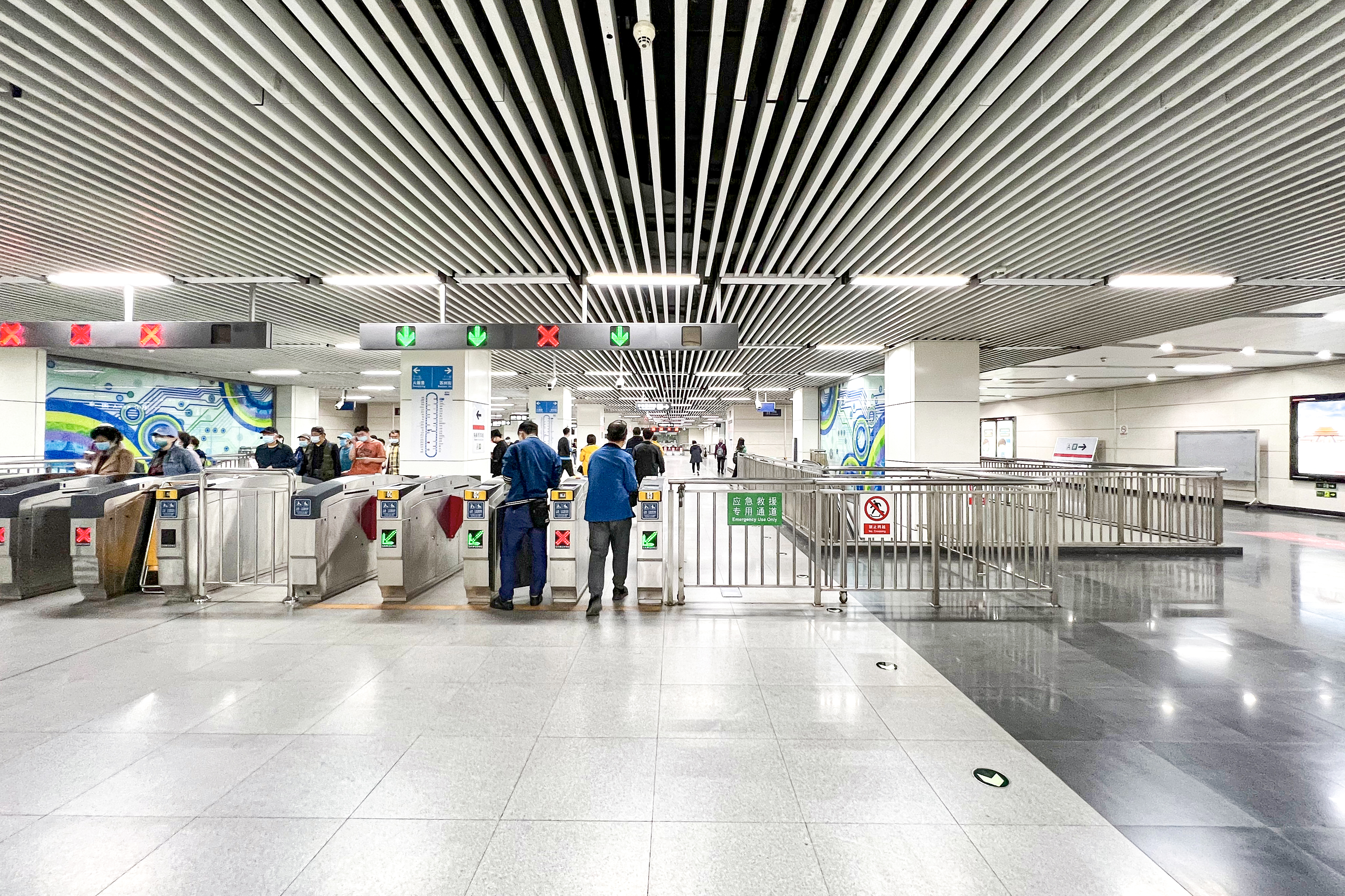
Line 10 concourse (April 2022)

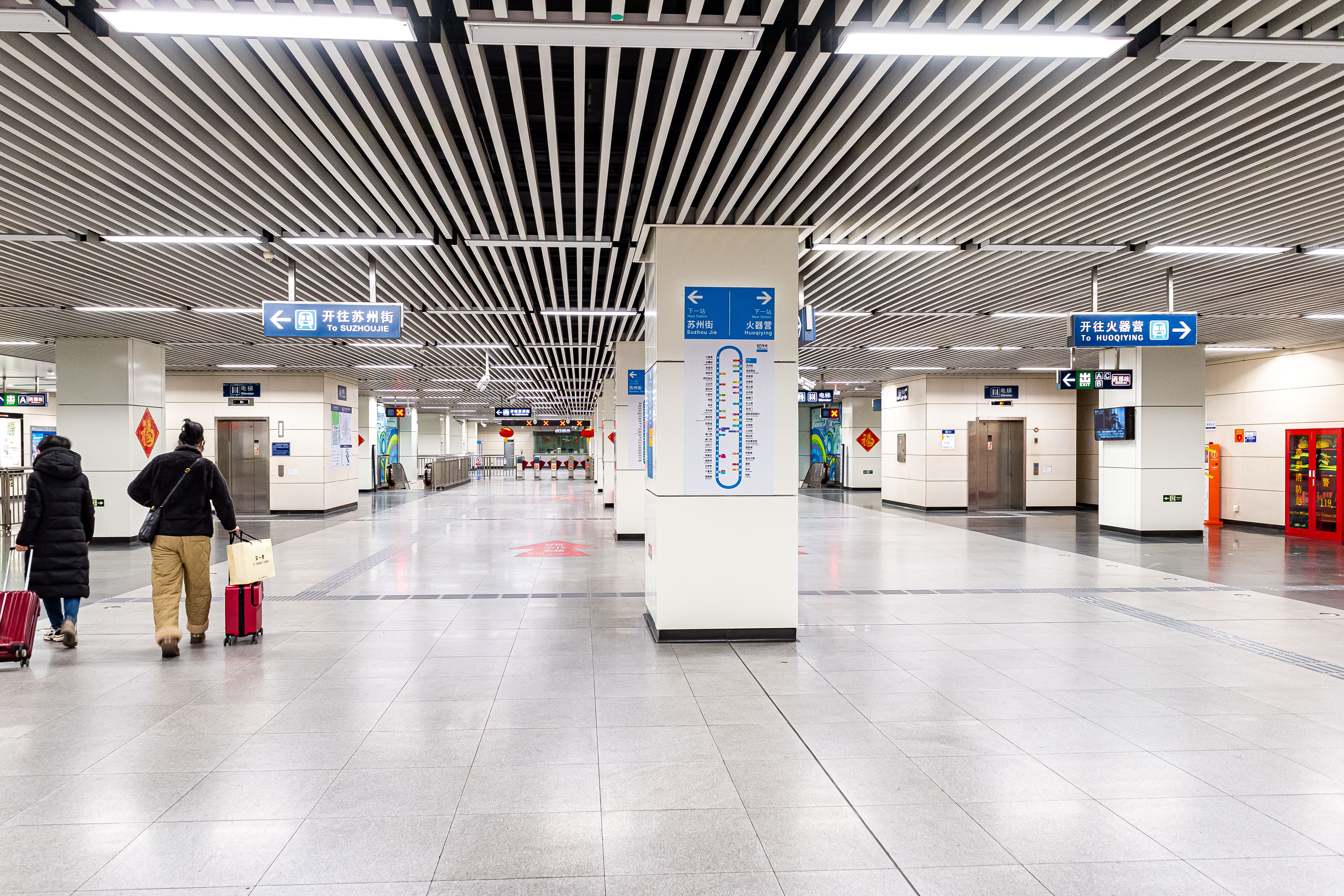
Line 10 concourse (February 2024)

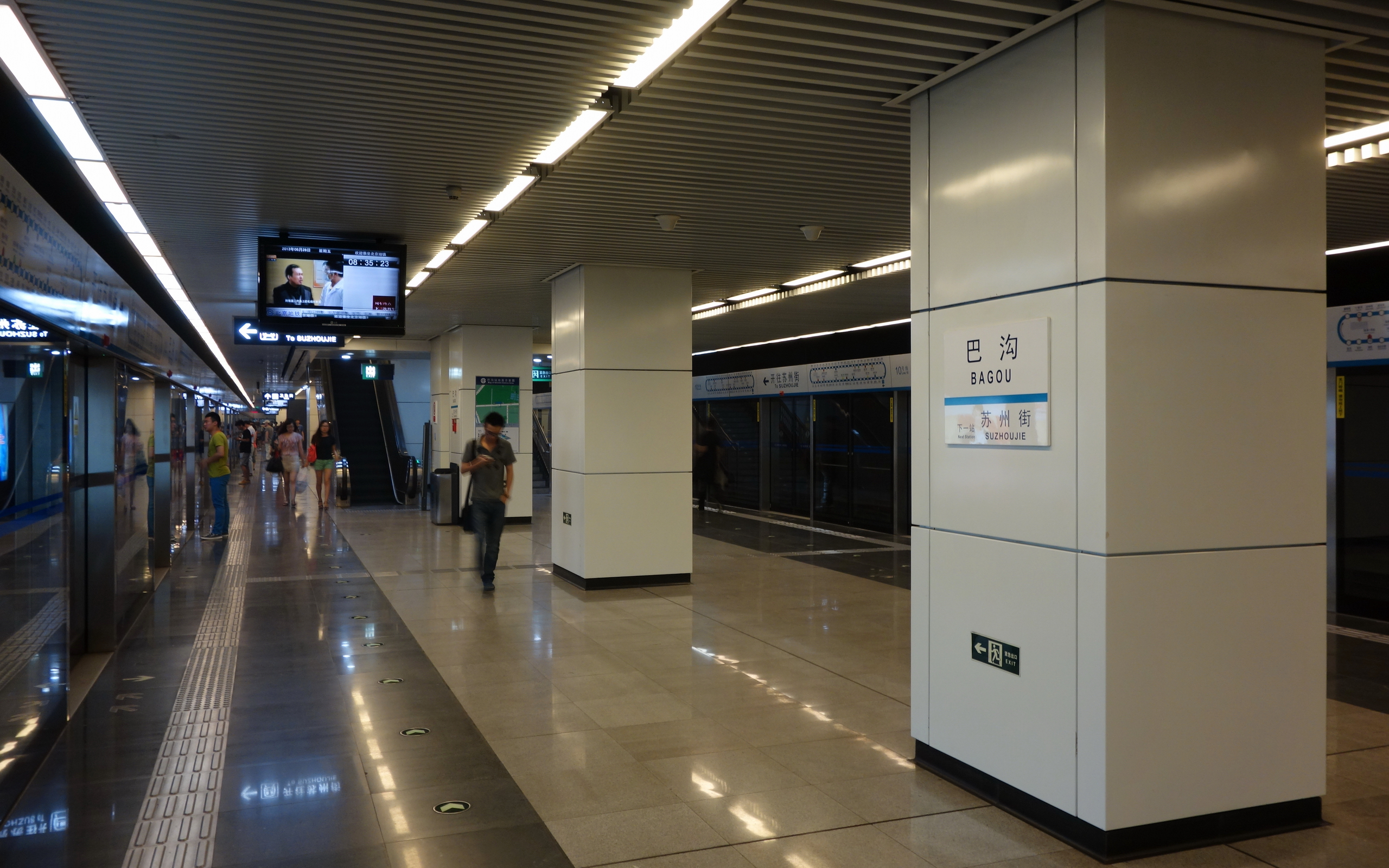
Line 10 clockwise platform

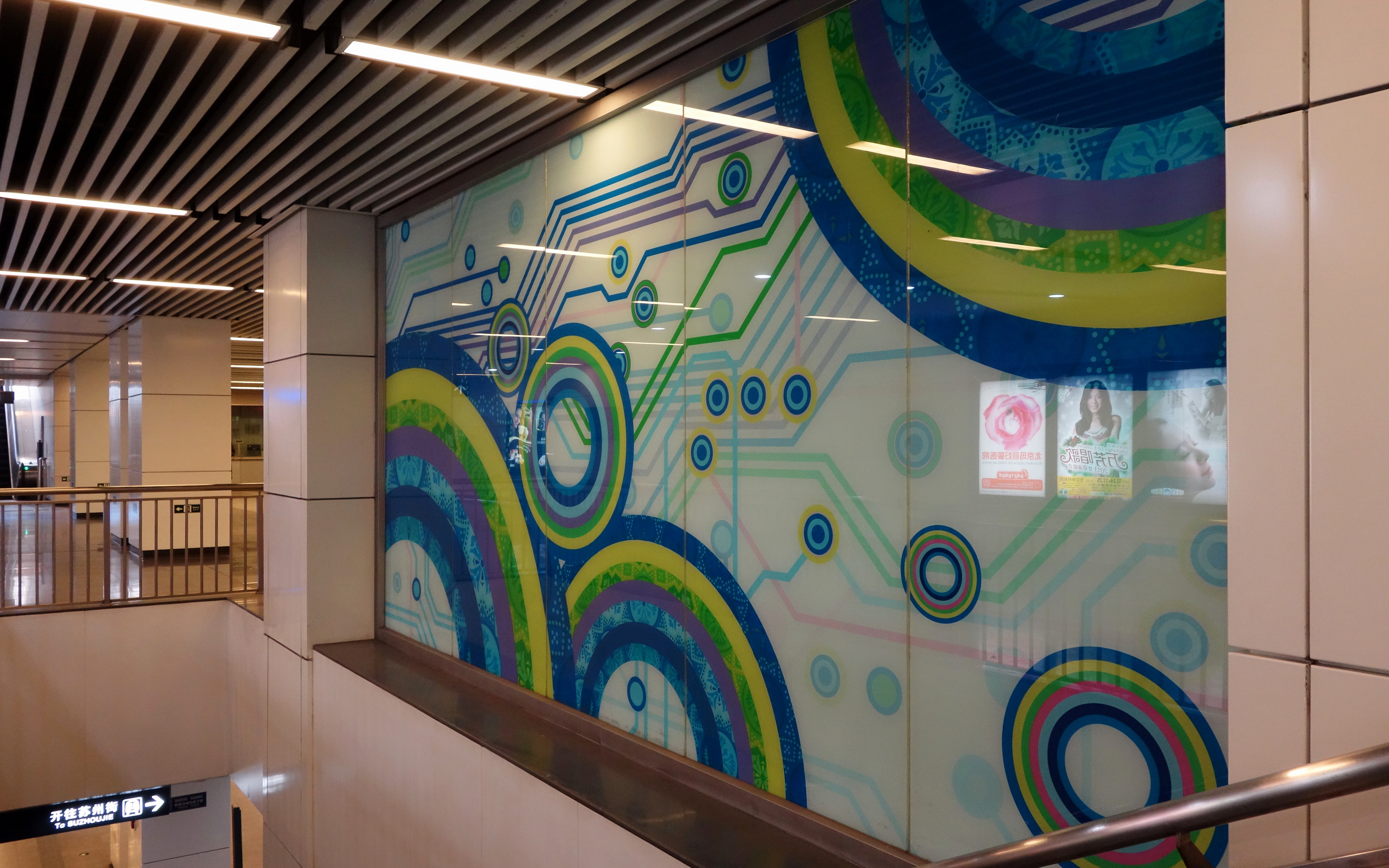
Station Art

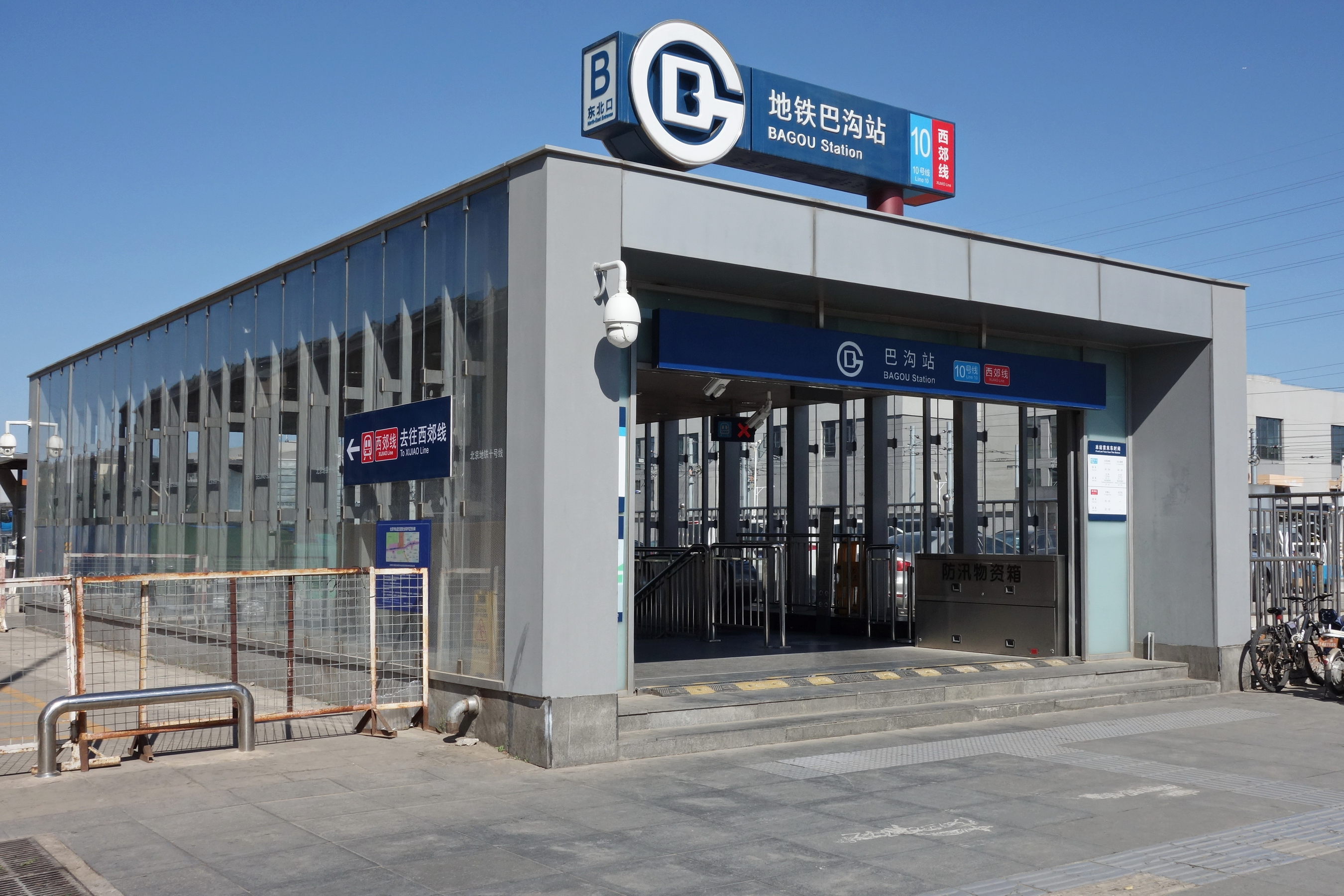
Exit B
