= Fragrant Hills station =

Beijing Subway light rail station

Fragrant Hills 香山
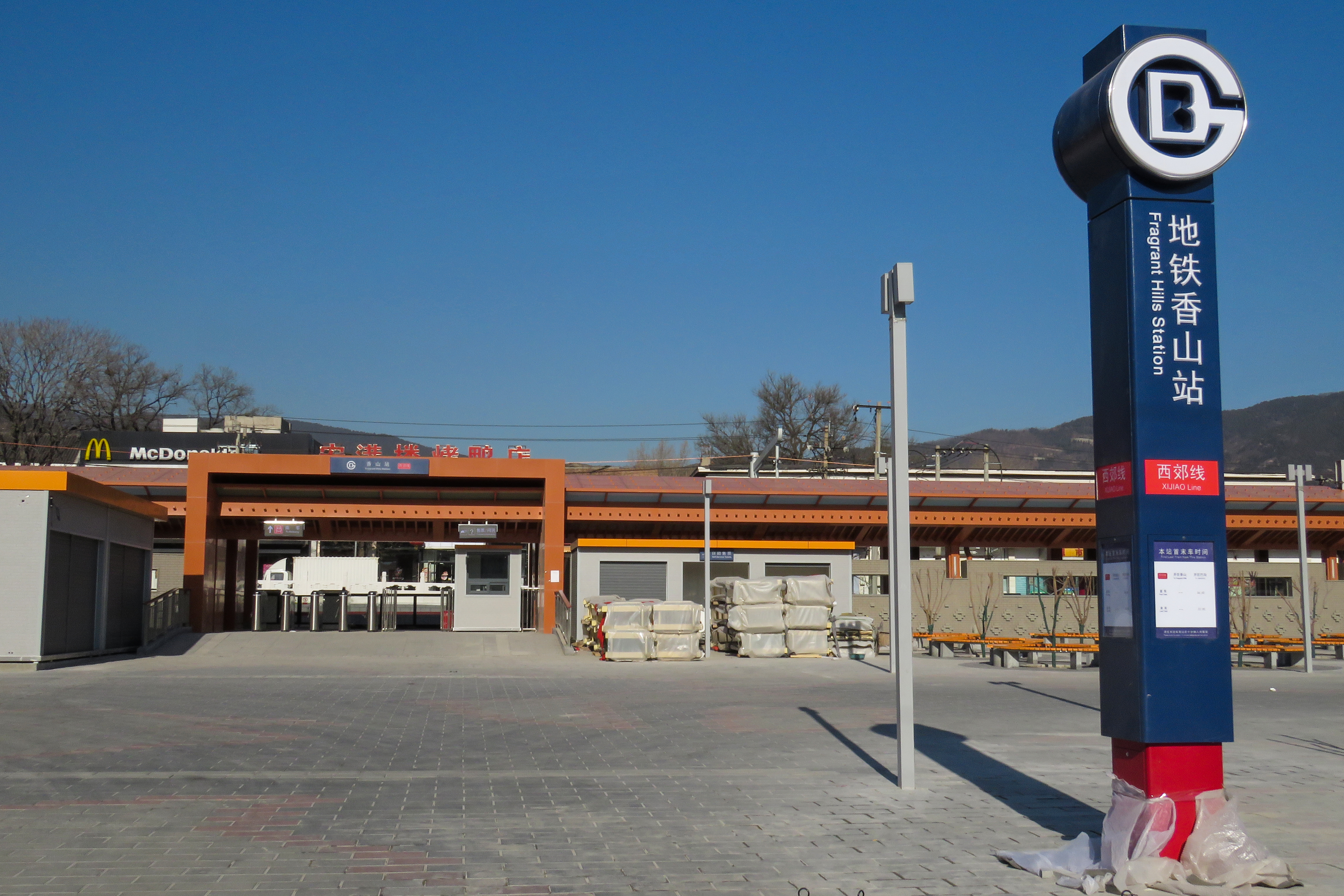
- Station square in December 2017

General information
- Location: Xiangshan Road (香山路); Xiangshan Subdistrict, Haidian District, Beijing; China
- Coordinates: 39°59′39″N 116°12′16″E
- Operator: Beijing Public Transit Tramway Co., Ltd.
- Line: Xijiao line
- Platforms: 1 (1 side platform)
- Tracks: 2

Construction
- Structure type: At-grade
- Accessible: Yes

History
- Opened: 30 December 2017

Services
Preceding station	Beijing Subway	Following station
Terminus	Xijiao line	China National Botanical Garden towards Bagou
Location
- Location within Beijing

Fragrant Hills station (Chinese: 香山站; pinyin: Xiāngshān zhàn) is a station on Xijiao line (light rail) of the Beijing Subway. This station opened to public on 30 December 2017.

== Station layout ==
The station has an at-grade single-sided platform.

== Accidents ==
On 1 January 2018, tram XJ003 derailed after a malfunction when departing from Fragrant Hills station at 2:36 PM with no passengers on board. The tram slid down the tracks with its control lever still at traction position after being lifted back on to the tracks later that day. The station was thus temporarily closed until 1 March 2018 after the derailment.
