= Angler's Terrace =

Angler's Terrace may refer to:

- Senkaku Islands, disputed islands in the East China Sea, known in Taiwan as Angler's Terrace
- Diaoyutai State Guesthouse, a historic hotel and guesthouse complex in Beijing, China
