= Ryu Myong-son =

North Korean official

- Born: North Korea

Korean name
- Hangul: 류명선
- RR: Ryu Myeongseon
- MR: Ryu Myŏngsŏn

Ryu Myong-son is a North Korean official who is the deputy director at the international affairs department of the Workers’ Party of Korea.

== Career ==
On July 23, 2018, Ryu was in Beijing to "strengthen its economic ties" with China. Korean Central Television reported that "Ryu was visiting Beijing, on his way to Guinea" with a stop in China. This stop "coincided with a US sanctions enforcement notice."

On May 14, 2018, Ryu arrived in China to possibly discuss "follow-up measures to what was agreed during the summit talks held last week between North Korea's Supreme leader Kim Jong Un and China's Paramount leader Xi Jinping." During this stay in China, he is reported to have stayed at the Diaoyutai State Guesthouse.
