= Yuyuantan Park =

Urban park in Haidian, Beijing

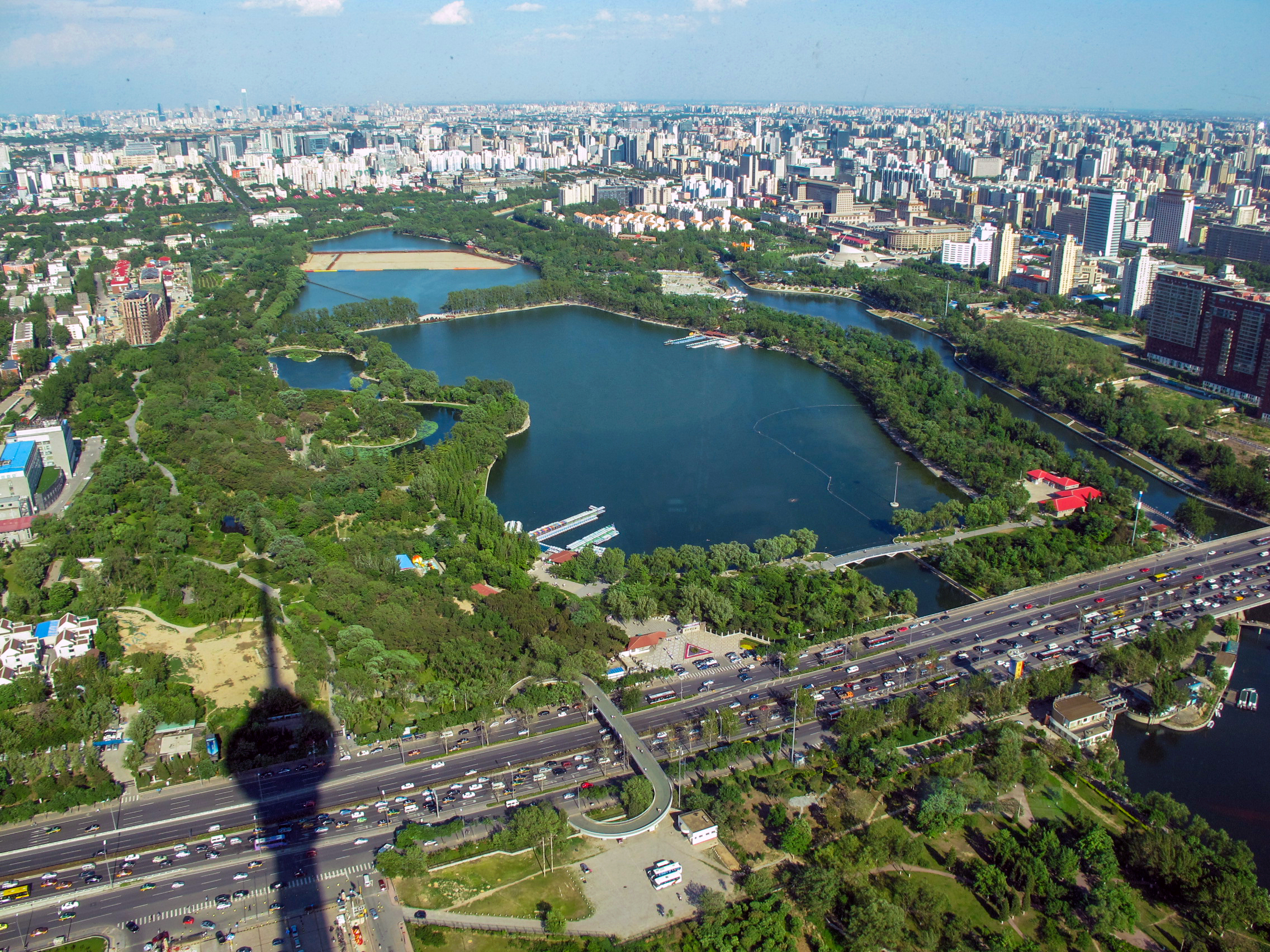
- Aerial of Yuyuantan Park
- Interactive map of Yuyuantan Park
- Type: Urban park
- Location: Beijing, China
- Coordinates: 39.9177°N 116.3109°E
- Area: 137 hectares (340 acres)
- Created: 1773 (the lake); 1960 (the park)
- Owner: Beijing Municipal Administration Center of Parks

Yuyuantan Park (Chinese: 玉渊潭公园, lit. 'Jade Deep Lake Park') is one of major urban parks in the city of Beijing. This park covers a territory of about 137 hectares (340 acres), 61 of which are covered by water. Yuyuantan is the largest water body in the park. The park is located between the western segment of the Third Ring Road and Diaoyutai State Guesthouse. The China Millennium Monument is located just to the south of the park, and the Chinese Navy Hospital is to the north of the park. Central Radio & TV Tower can be viewed in the park.

Yuyuantan has a long history. During the Liao (907–1125) and Jurchen Jin (1115–1234) dynasties, Beijing was the secondary capital city of those two dynasties, and the area of current Yuyuantan was a notable attraction outside of the city at that time. However, there was no lake back in those days. At that time, the place of current Yuyuantan Park was just a low land.

Yuyuantan Lake was first created during the Qing dynasty when the Qianlong Emperor was the ruler. In 1773, springs from Fragrant Hills were introduced into the low land and impounded to be a lake. Beside the lake, the Qianlong Emperor built an imperial palace for short stays. In the later half of the Qing dynasty, however, the palace was gradually abandoned, and the lake also almost dried up.

In 1960, the Beijing government introduced water from the Yongding River into the lake and made it revived. Yuyuantan became an urban park of Beijing. In the 1990s, the rest parts of the park were built, and cherry trees was widely planted in the park. Now, Yuyuantan Park has become a well-known place to view cherry blossoms in China.

== Transport ==
- Yuyuantan Park East Gate station
