= Ganjia Kou station =

Beijing Subway Line 16 station

Ganjia Kou 甘家口
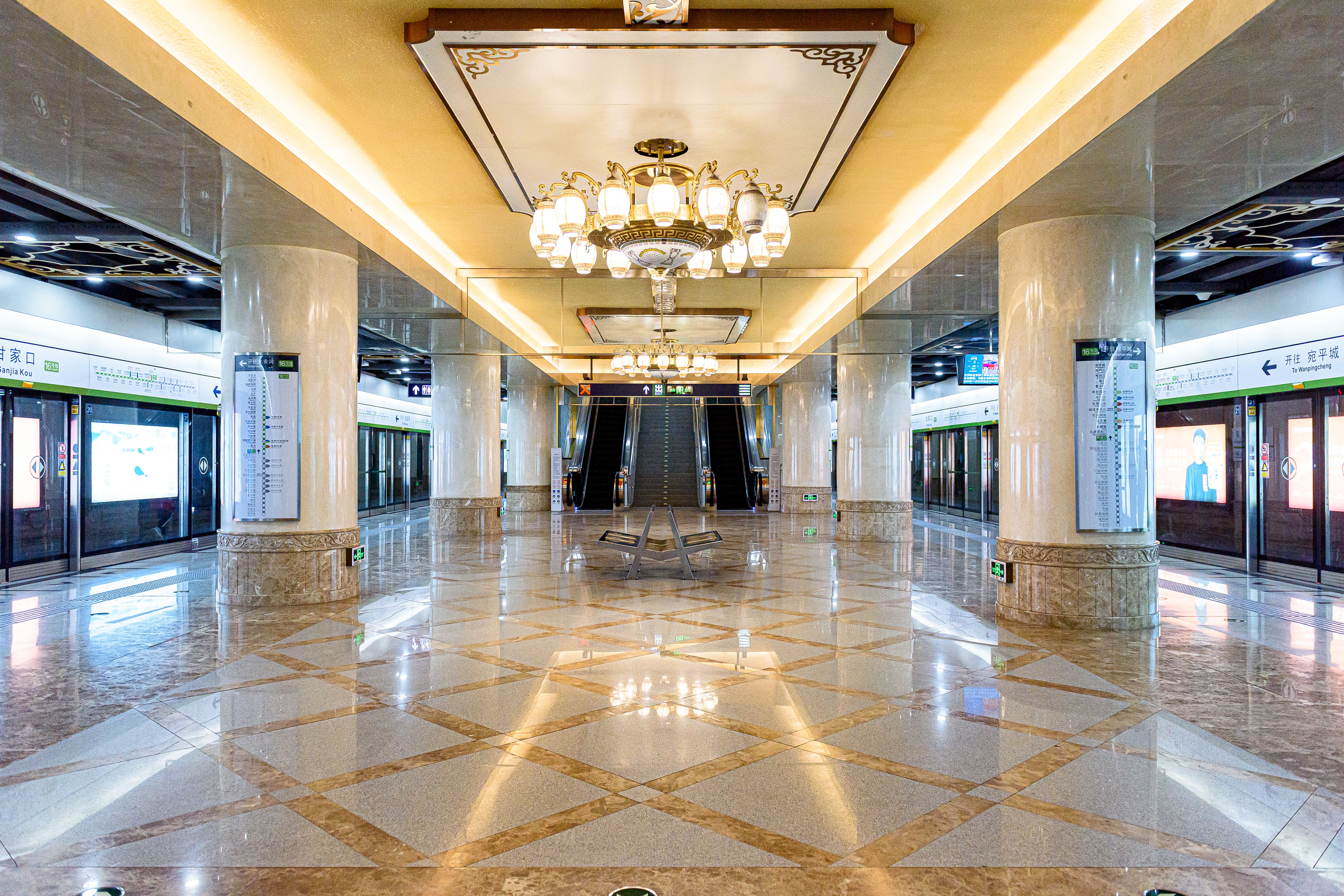
- Platform in January 2024

General information
- Location: Intersection of Sanlihe Rd. and Fuchengmenwai St., Haidian and Xicheng districts, Beijing; China
- Coordinates: 39°55′18″N 116°19′42″E
- Operator: Beijing MTR Metro Line 16 Corp., Ltd.
- Line: Line 16
- Platforms: 2 (1 island platform)
- Tracks: 2

Construction
- Structure type: Underground
- Accessible: Yes

History
- Opened: December 31, 2020; 5 years ago

Services
Preceding station	Beijing Subway	Following station
Erligou towards Bei'anhe	Line 16	Yuyuantan Dongmen (Yuyuantan Park East Gate) towards Wanpingcheng
Location
- Location within Beijing

Ganjia Kou station (Chinese: 甘家口站; pinyin: Gānjiākǒu zhàn) is a station on Line 16 of the Beijing Subway. The station was the southern terminus of the line until the opening of Yuyuantan Dongmen (Yuyuantan Park East Gate) on December 31, 2021.

== History ==
This station was once known as Fuwai Dajie station. In 2013, it was renamed to Ganjia Kou station. The station opened on December 31, 2020. It is planned that the Phase 2 of Line 3 will also stop at this station.

== Station layout ==
The station has an underground island platform. There are 3 exits, lettered A, B and C. Exits A and C are accessible via elevators.

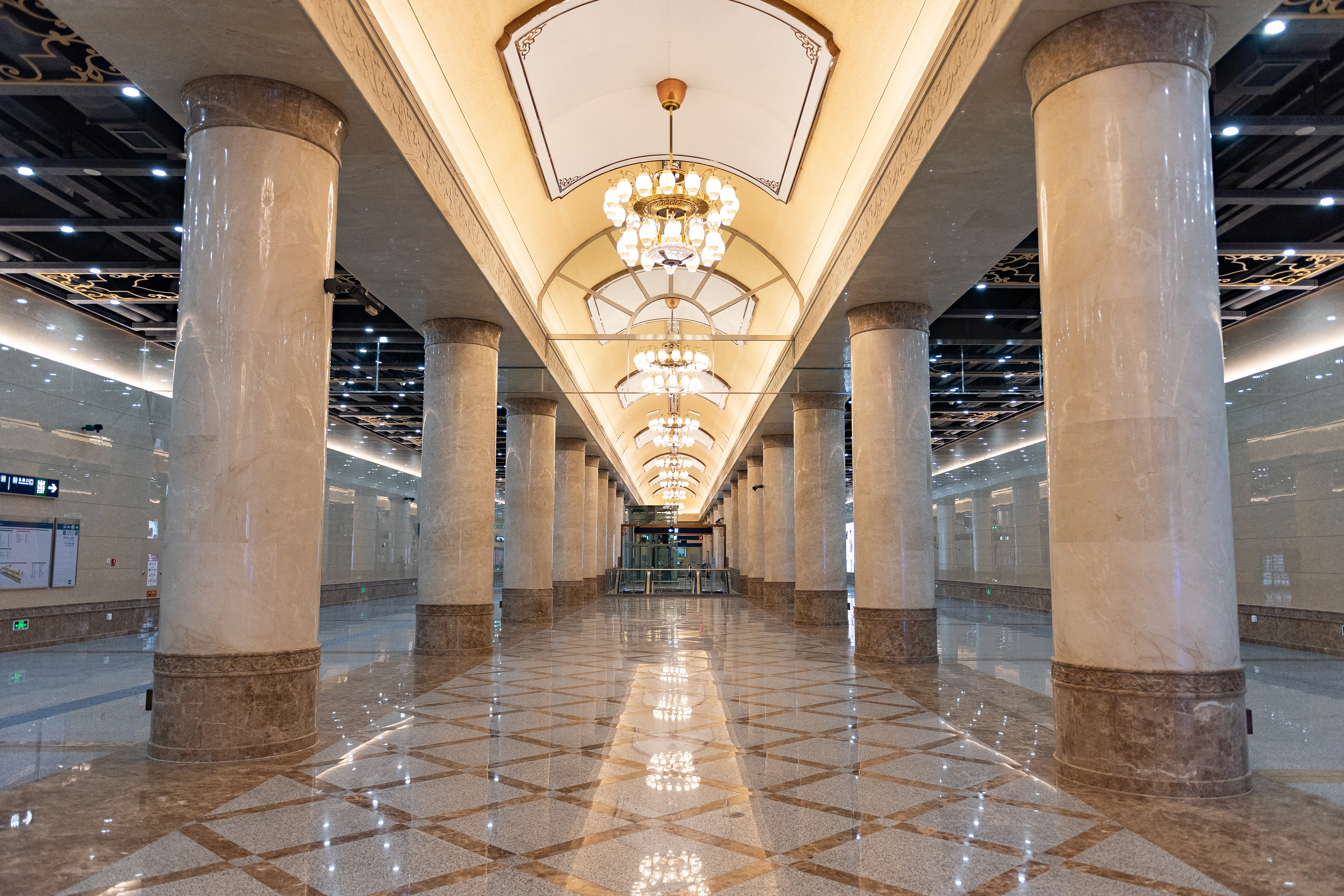
Station concourse
