= Erligou station =

Beijing Subway Line 6 and Line 16 station

Erligou 二里沟
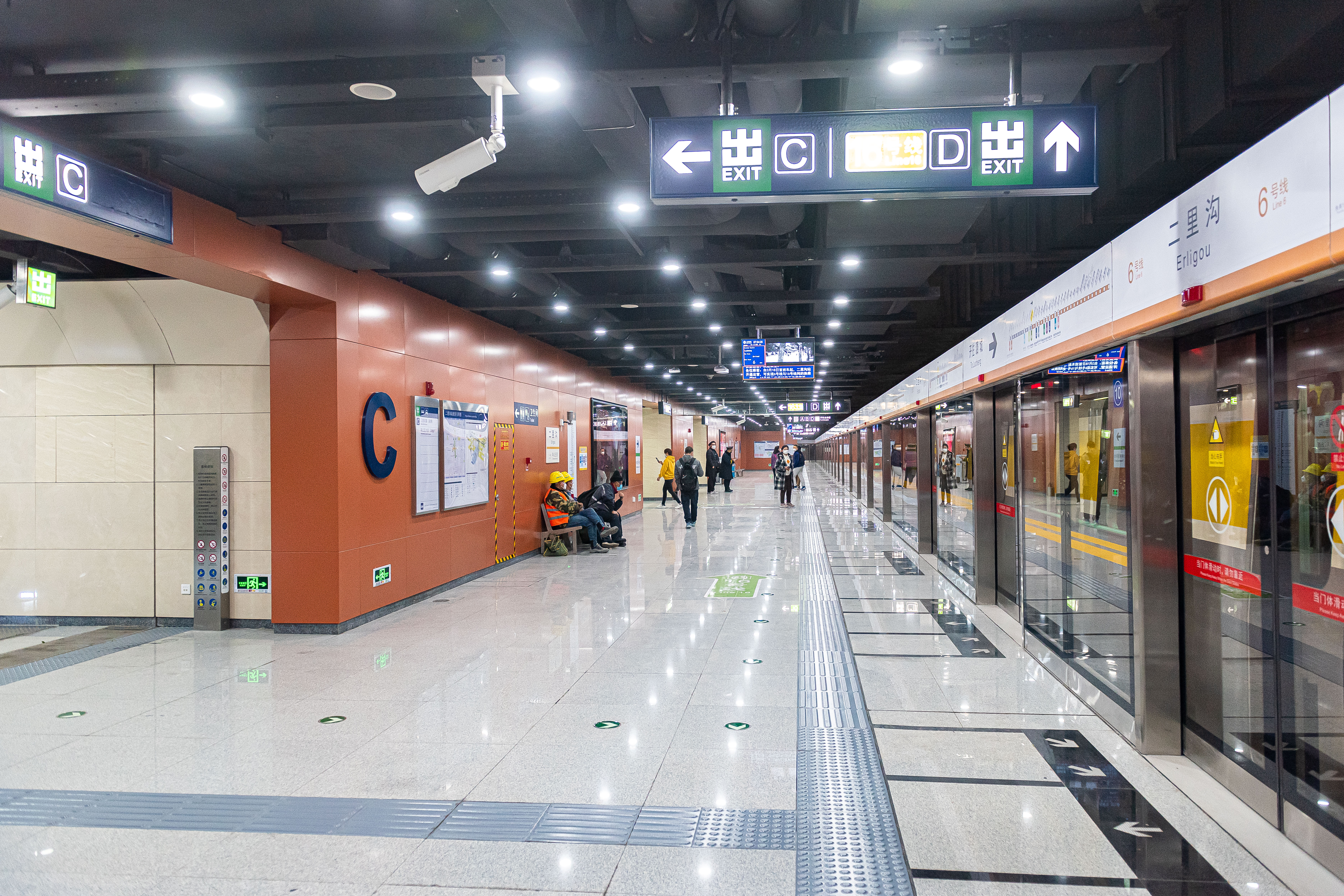
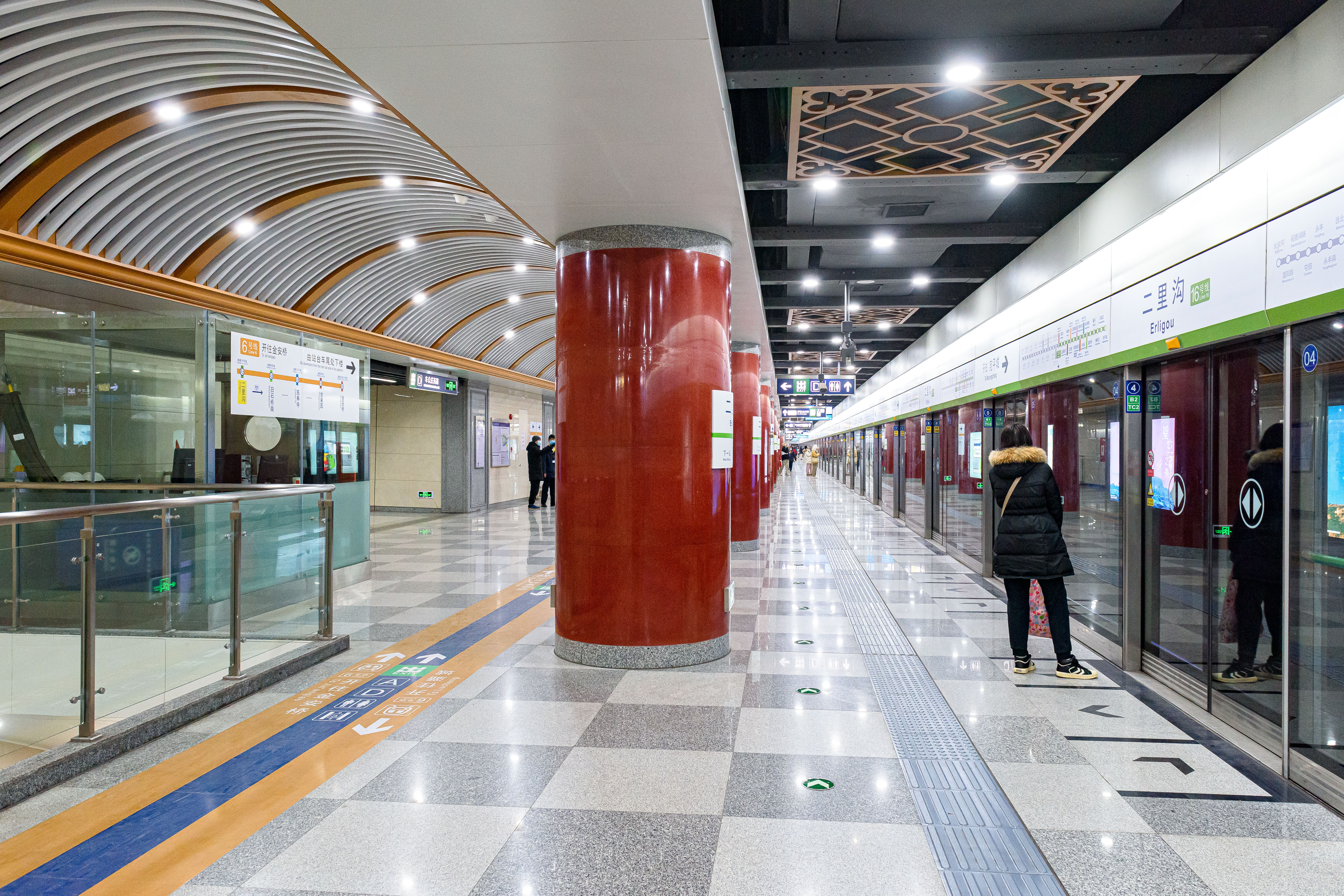
- Line 6 eastbound platform Line 16 southbound platform

General information
- Location: Chegongzhuang West Road / Chegongzhuang Street and Sanlihe Road; Haidian District / Xicheng District border, Beijing; China
- Coordinates: 39°55′52″N 116°19′38″E
- Operator: Beijing Mass Transit Railway Operation Corporation Limited (Line 6); Beijing MTR Metro Line 16 Corp. Ltd. (Line 16)
- Lines: Line 6; Line 16
- Platforms: 4 (4 side platforms)
- Tracks: 4

Construction
- Structure type: Underground
- Accessible: Yes

History
- Opened: March 18, 2023; 3 years ago

Services
Preceding station	Beijing Subway	Following station
Baishiqiaonan towards Jin'anqiao	Line 6	Chegongzhuangxi towards Luyang
National Library towards Bei'anhe	Line 16	Ganjia Kou towards Wanpingcheng
Location
- Location within Beijing

Erligou station (simplified Chinese: 二里沟站; traditional Chinese: 二里溝站; pinyin: Èrlǐgōu Zhàn) is a station on Line 6 and Line 16 of the Beijing Subway. The station opened on March 18, 2023.

== History ==
Erligou station did not enter into operation along with Line 6 Phase I on December 30, 2012. Both Line 6 and Line 16 platforms opened on March 18, 2023. The platform for Line 16 is above the Line 6 platform.

== Location ==
The station is located at the intersection of the north-south Sanlihe Road with the east-west thoroughfare known as Chegongzhuang West Road (车公庄西路) to the west of Sanlihe Road and Chegongzhuang Street (车公庄大街) to the east.

== Station layout ==
Both the line 6 and line 16 stations have underground side platforms. There are 5 exits, lettered A1, A2, B, C and D. Exits A1 and A2 are accessible via elevators.

== Gallery ==
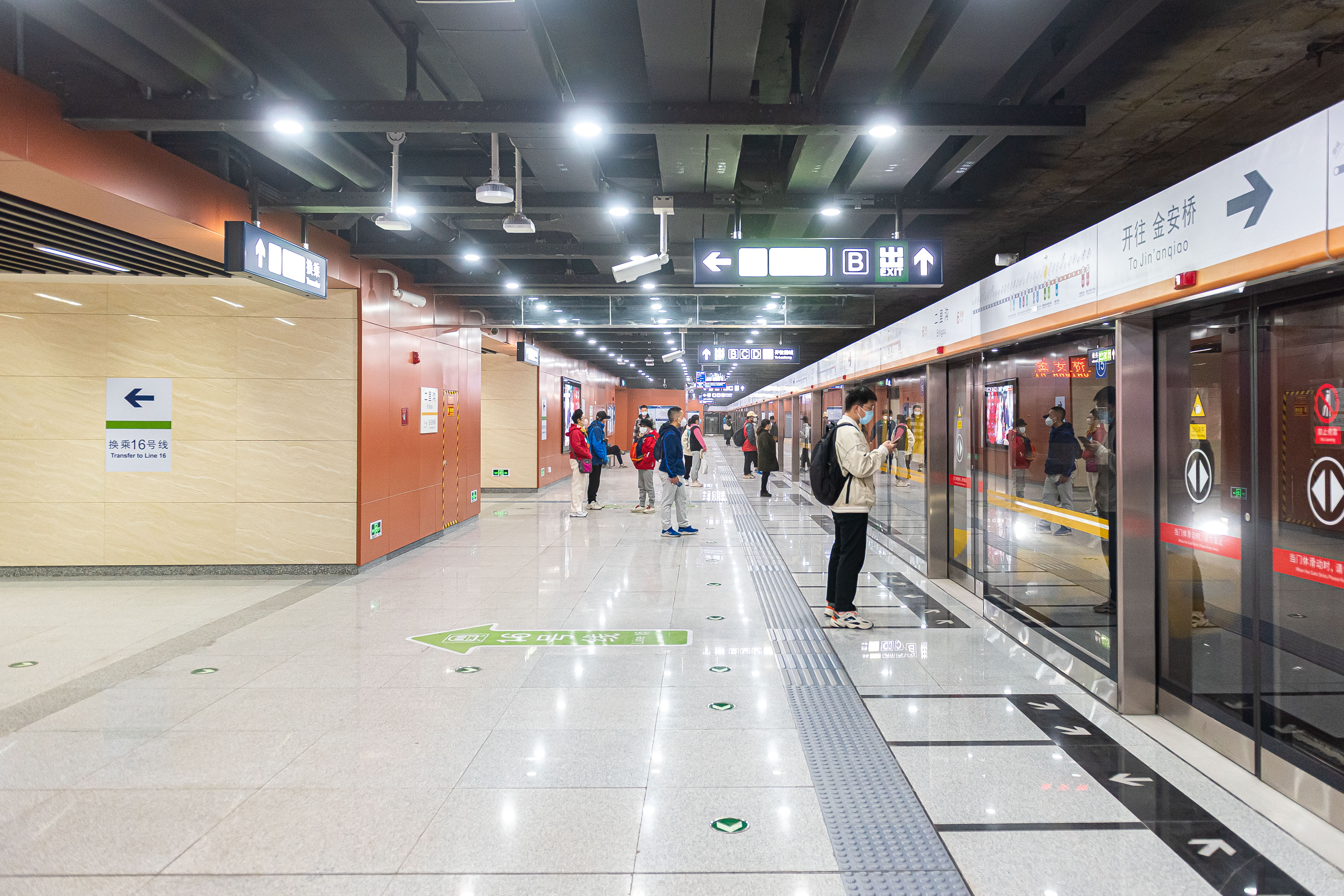
Line 6 westbound platform

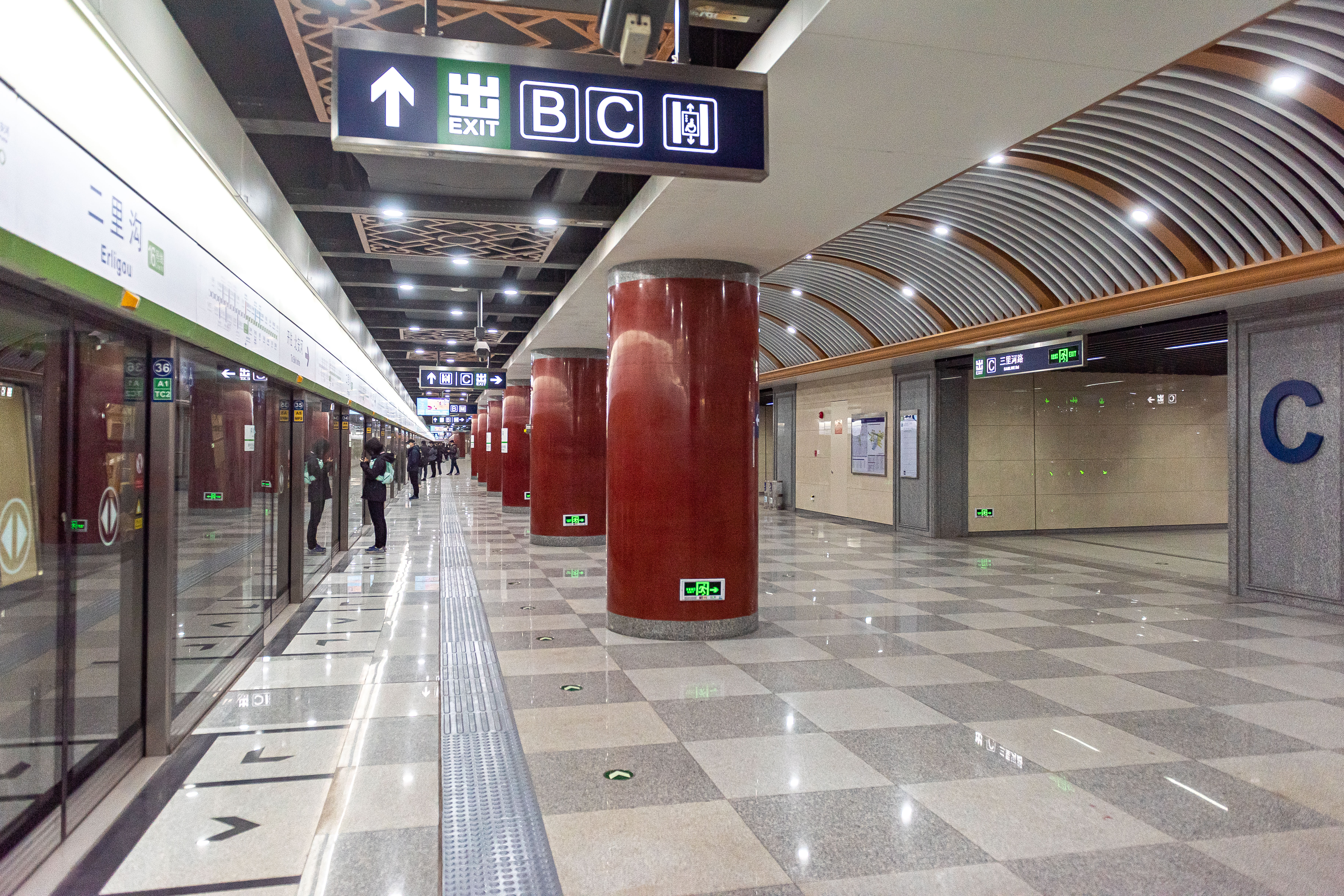
Line 16 northbound platform

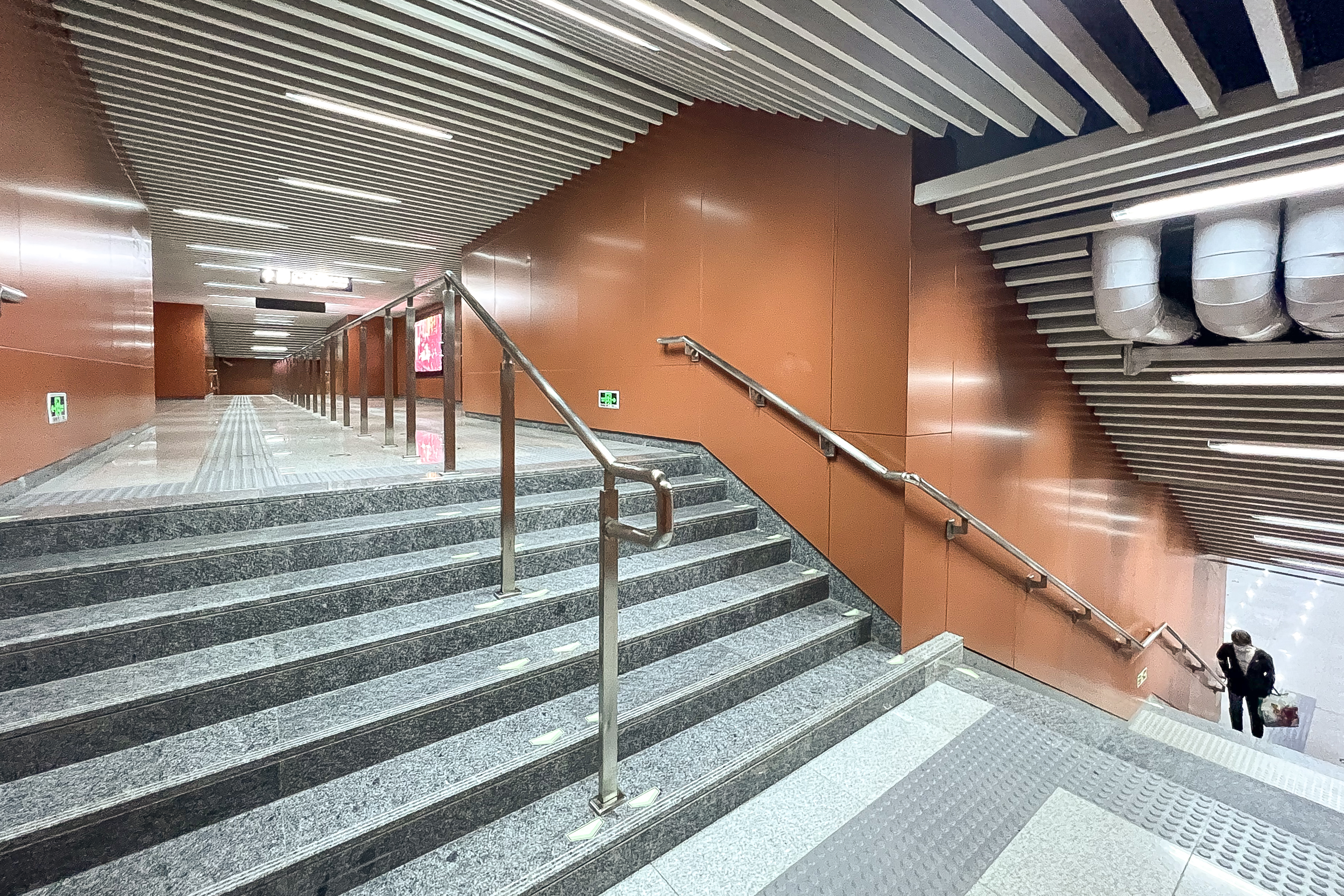
Line 6 platform overpass

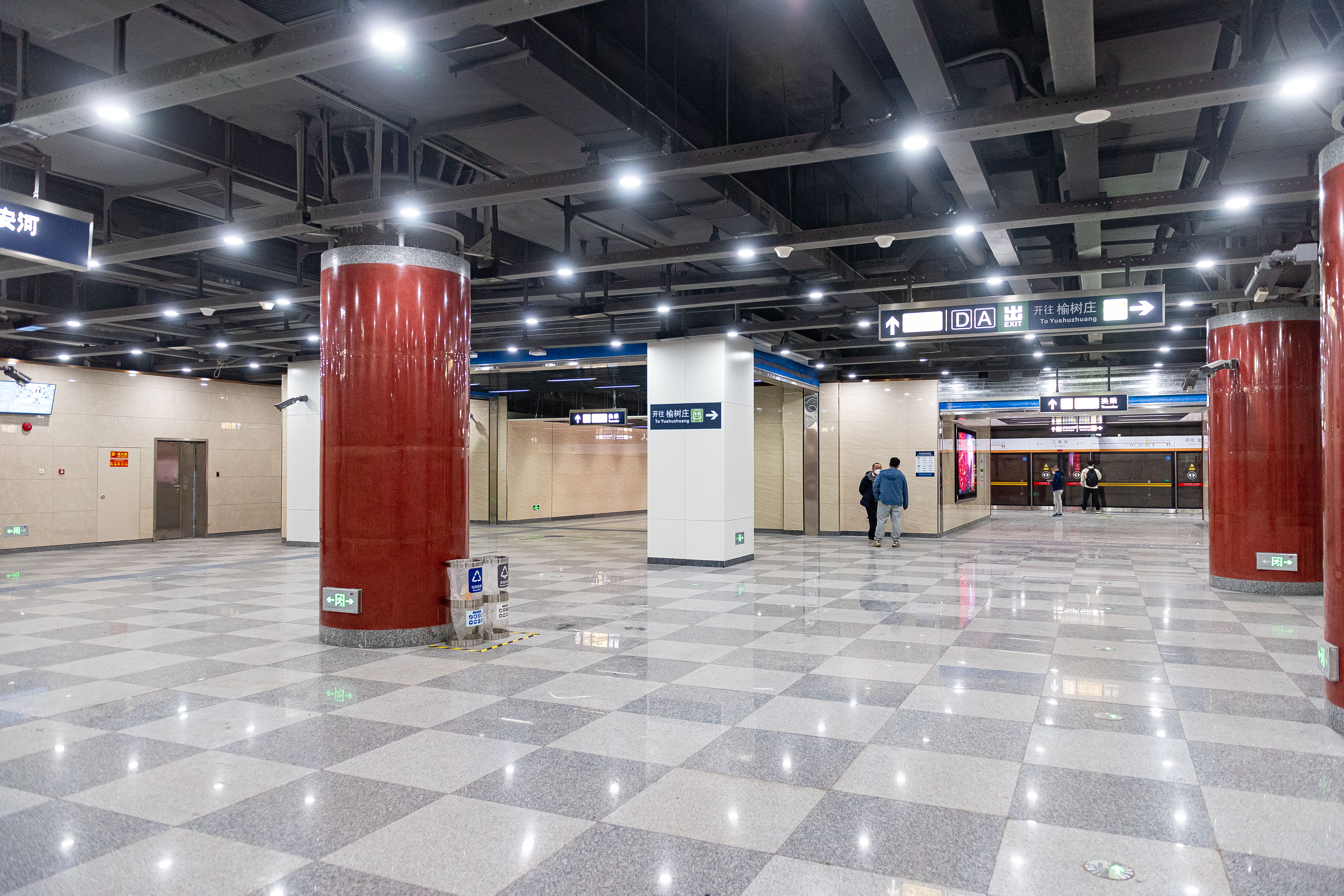
Line 6 North interchange concourse

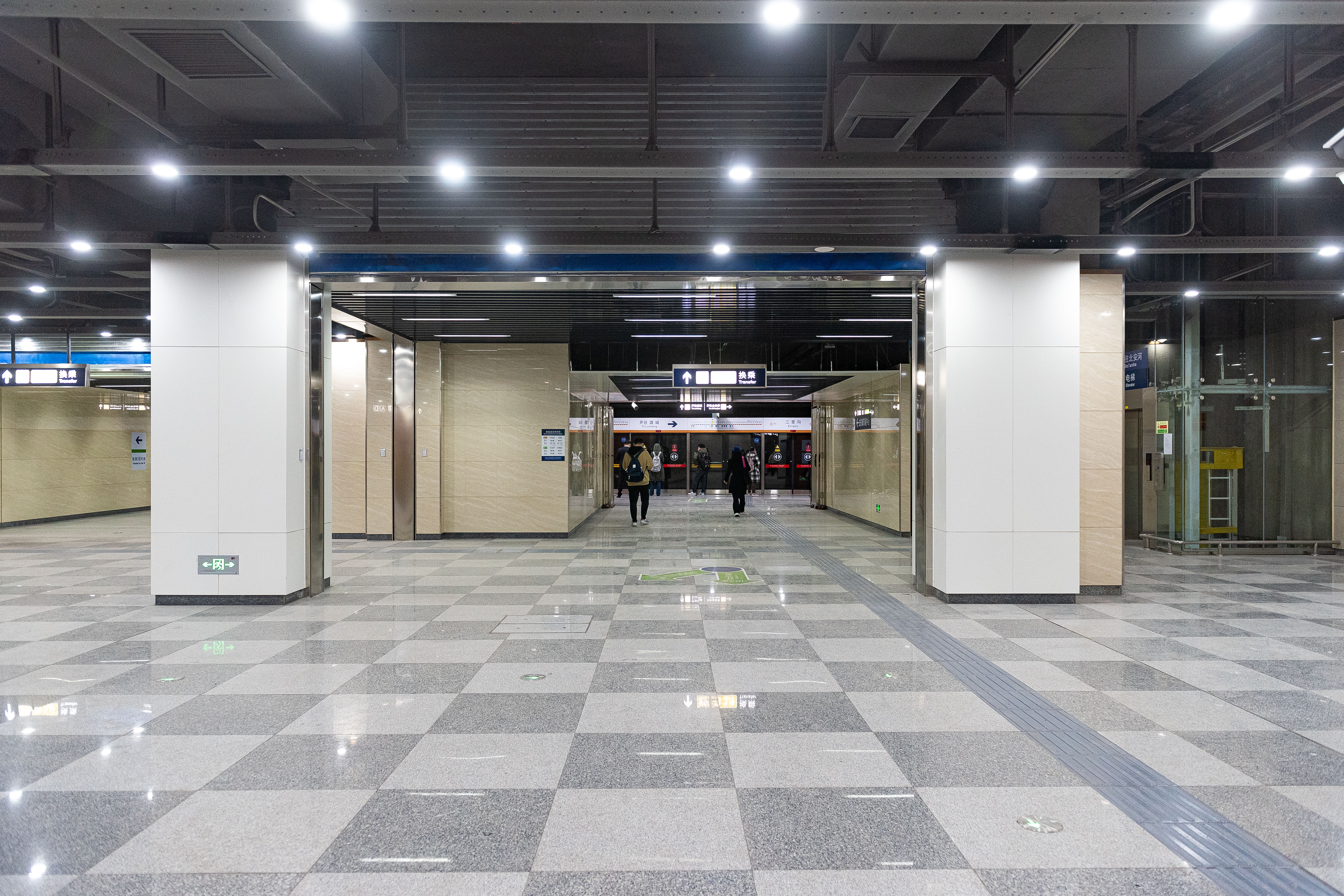
Line 6 South interchange concourse

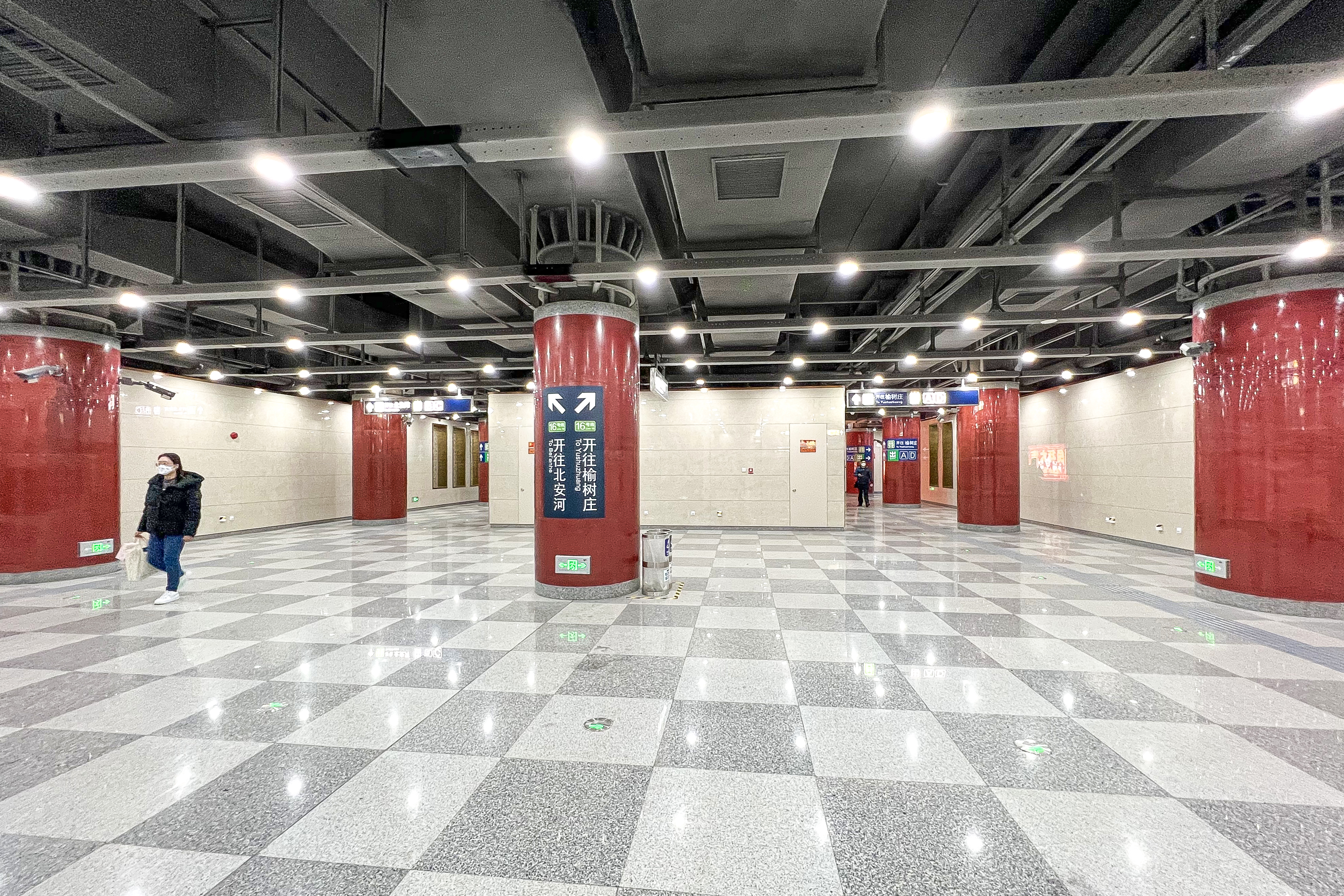
Line 6 South interchange concourse (2)

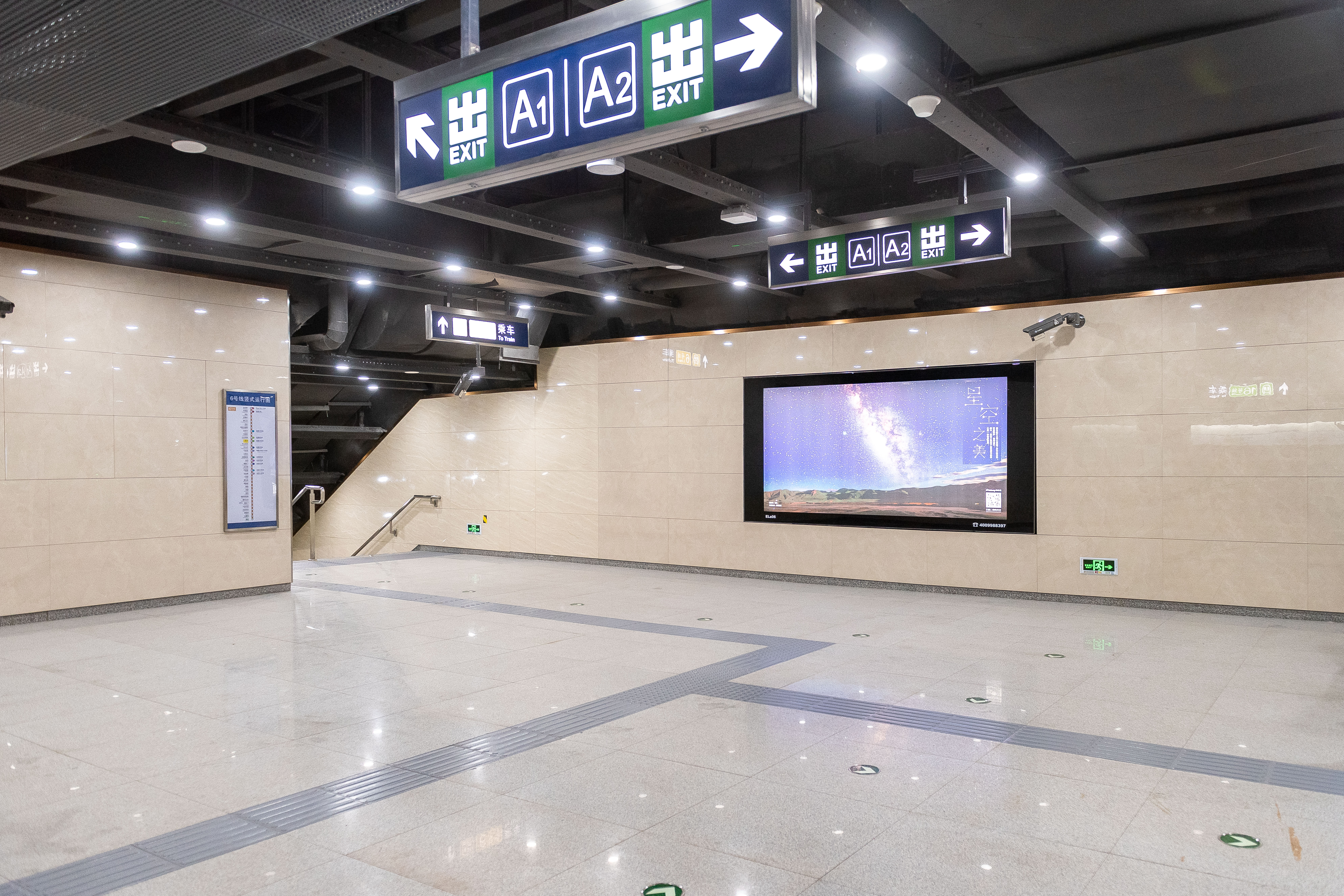
Exit A plug-in concourse, notice the bifurcation point between the Exit A1 and A2 plug-in halls shows that the two plug-in halls are not completely flatlined

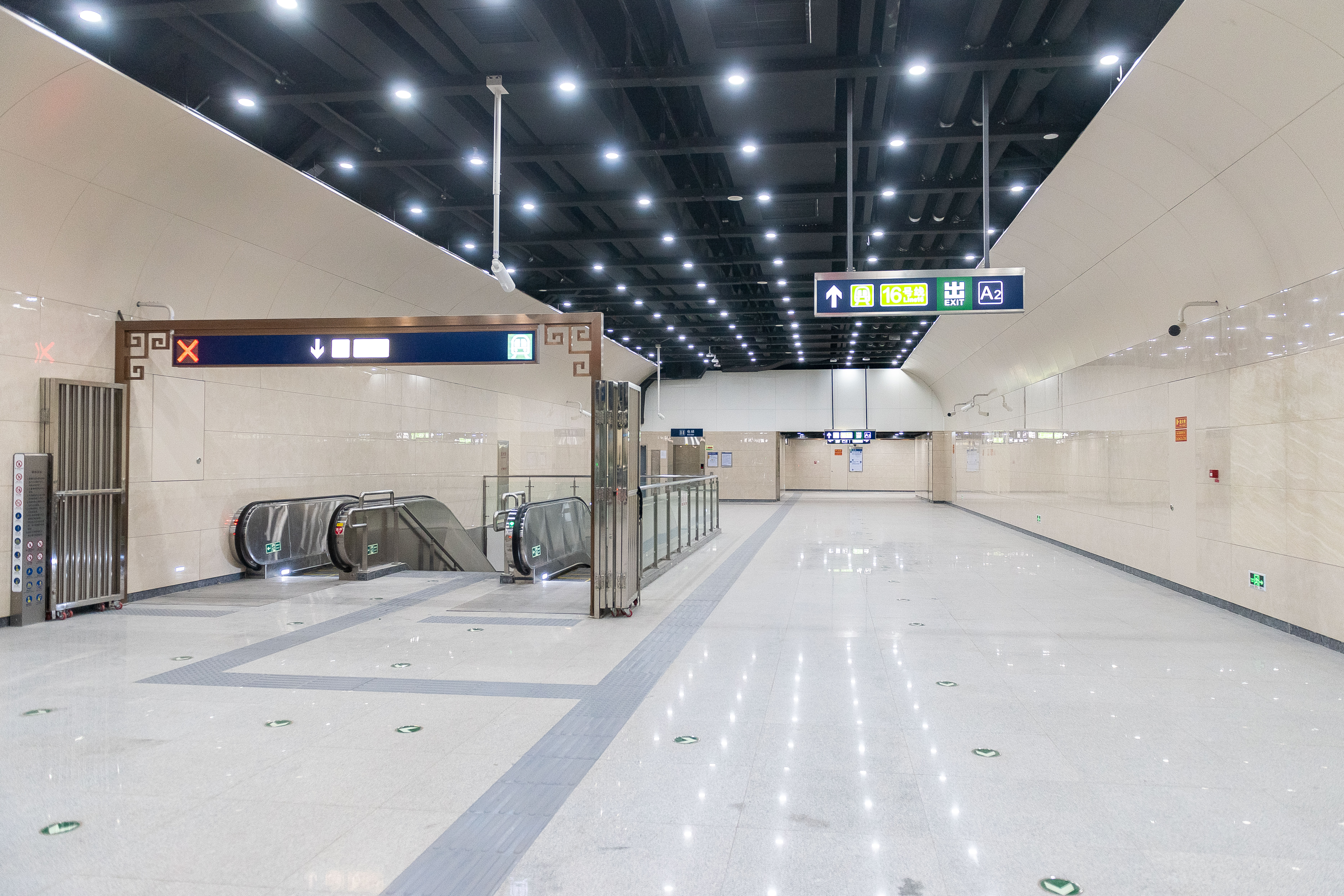
Exit A1 plug-in concourse

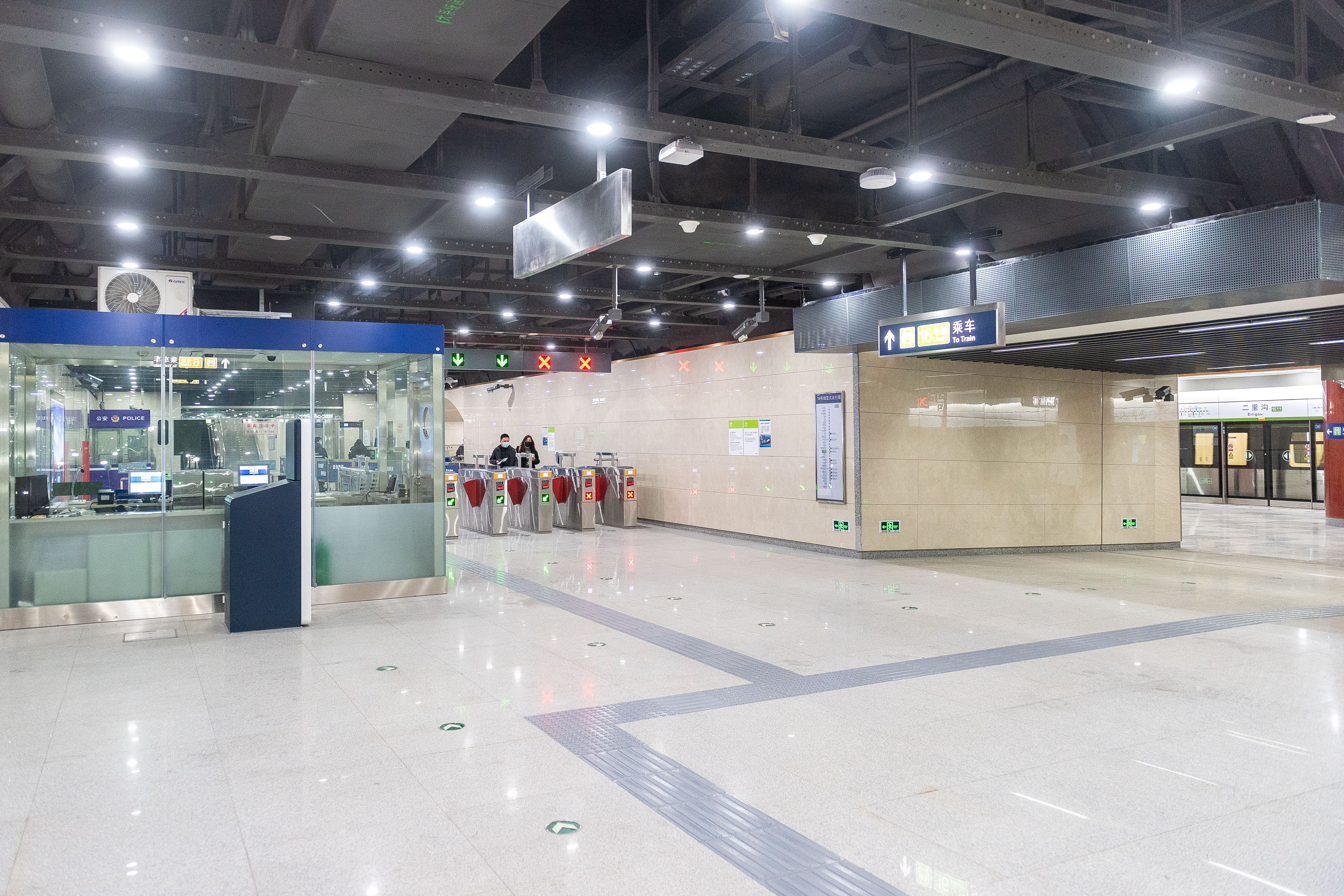
Exit A2 plug-in concourse

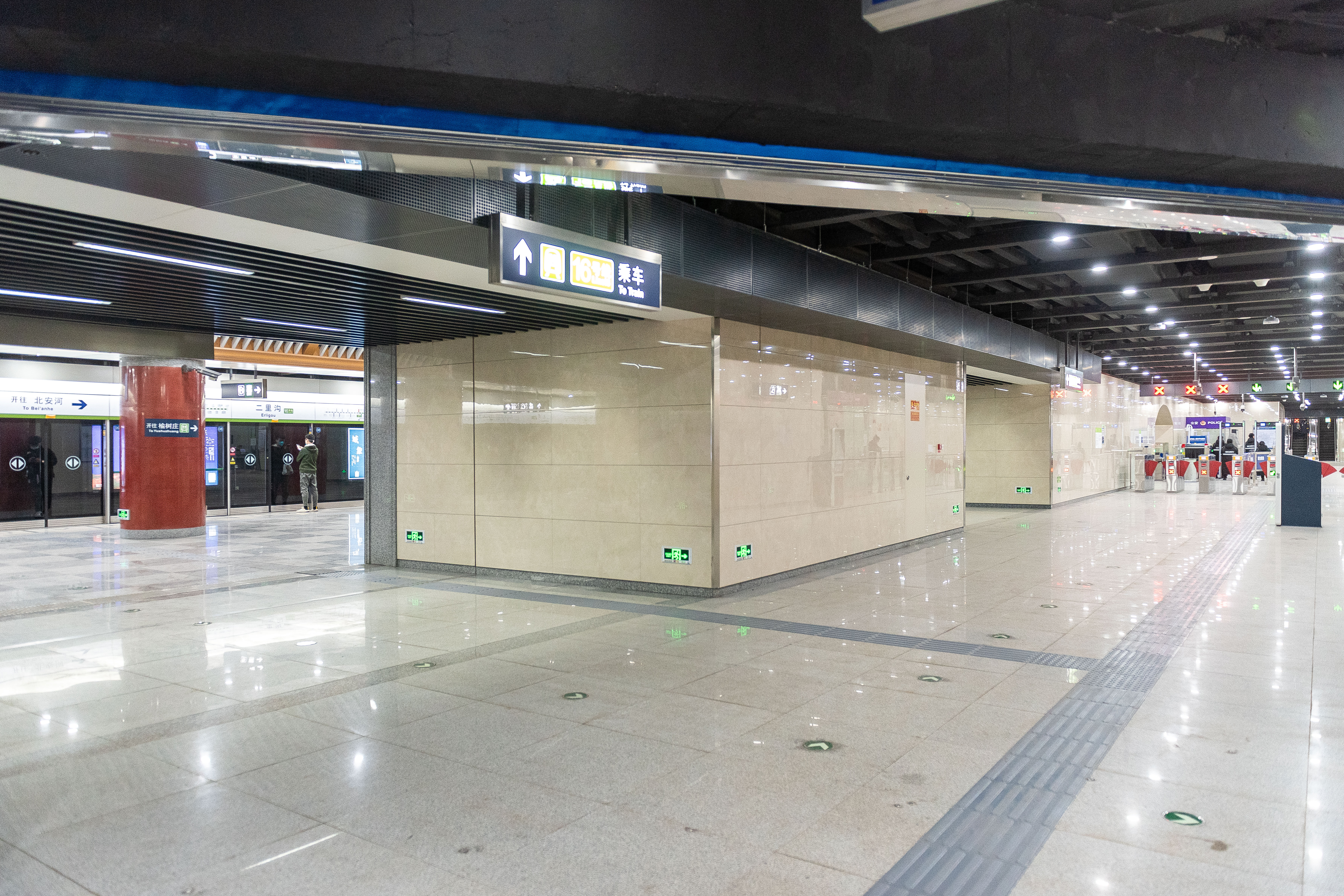
Exit B plug-in concourse

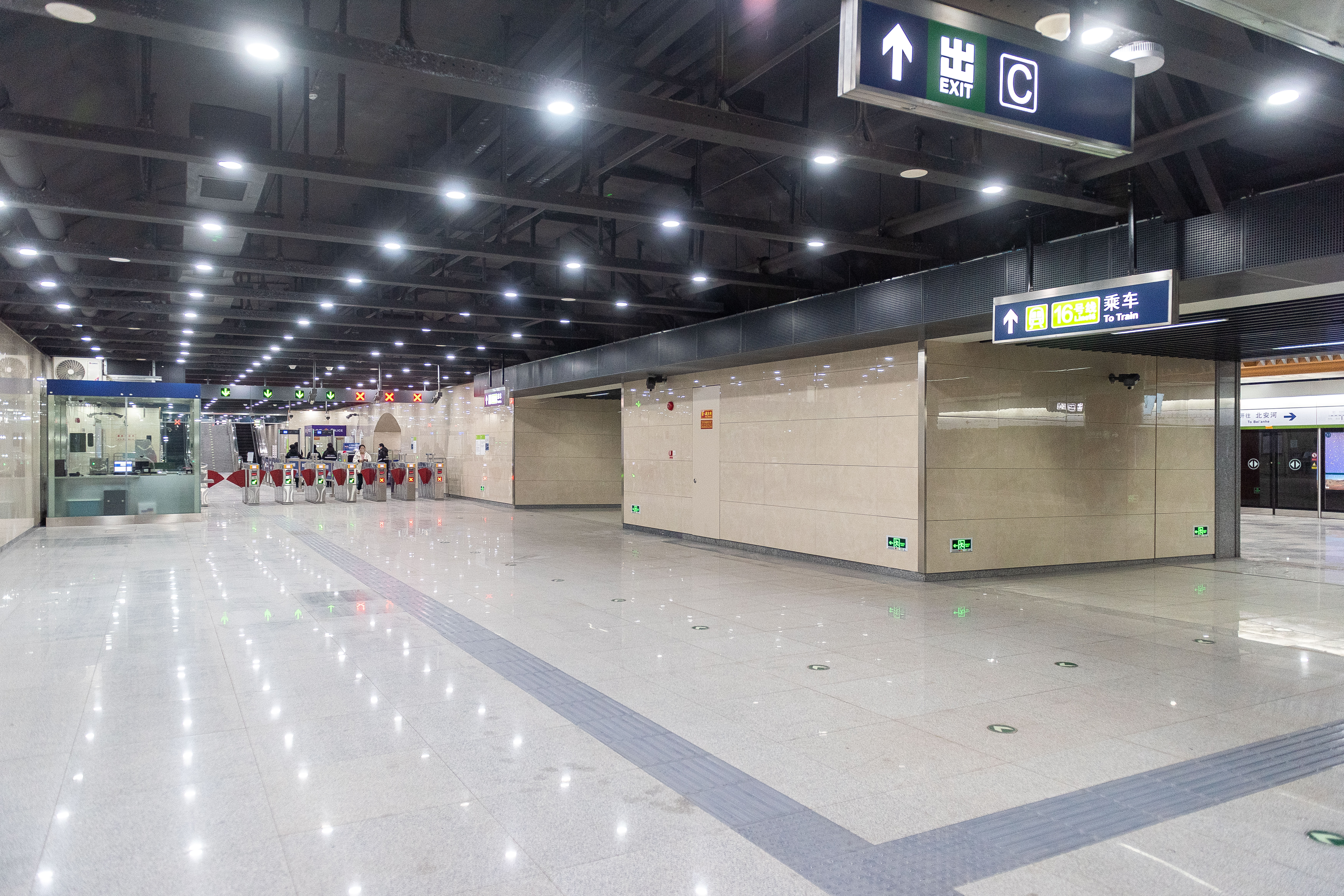
Exit C plug-in concourse

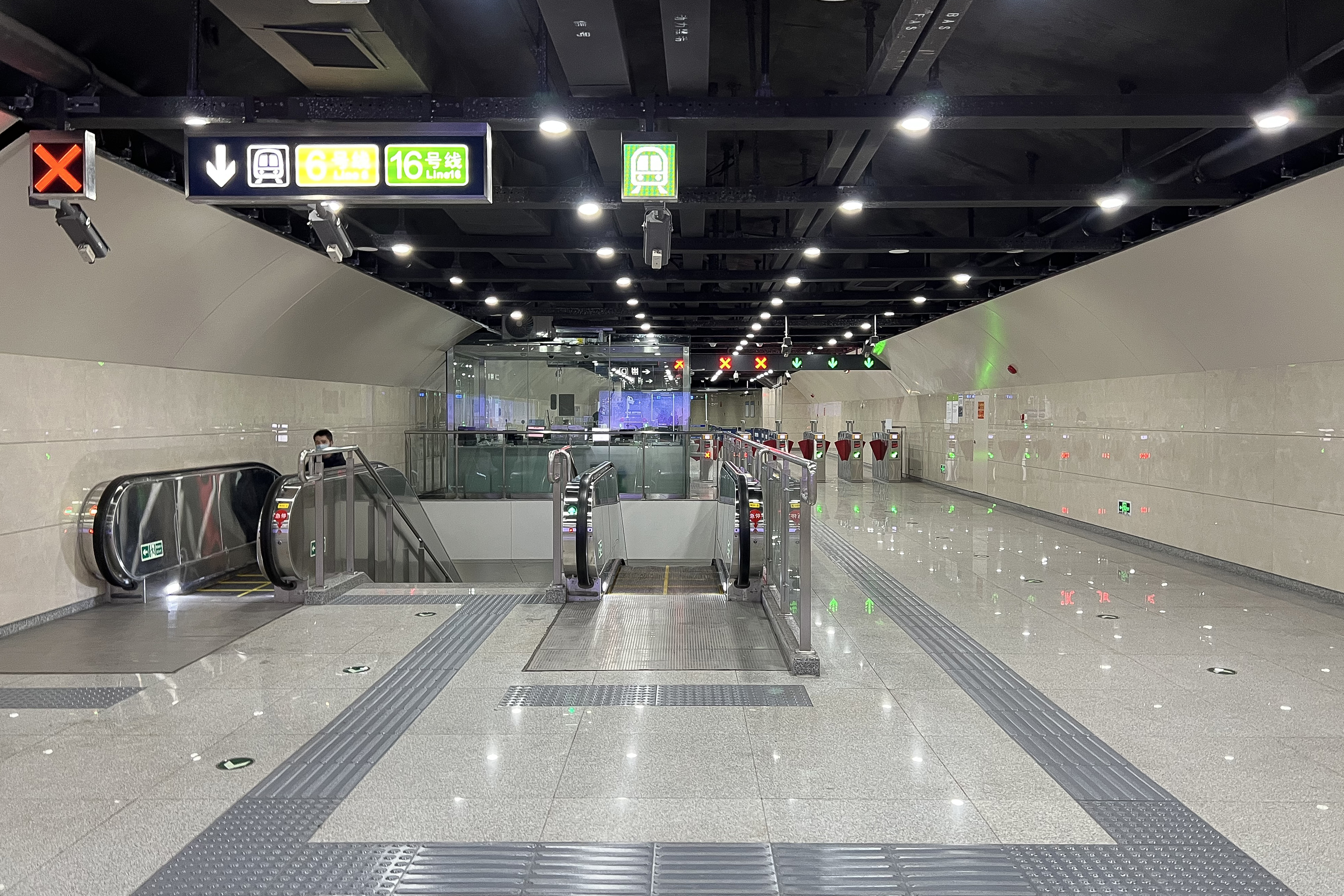
Exit D plug-in concourse

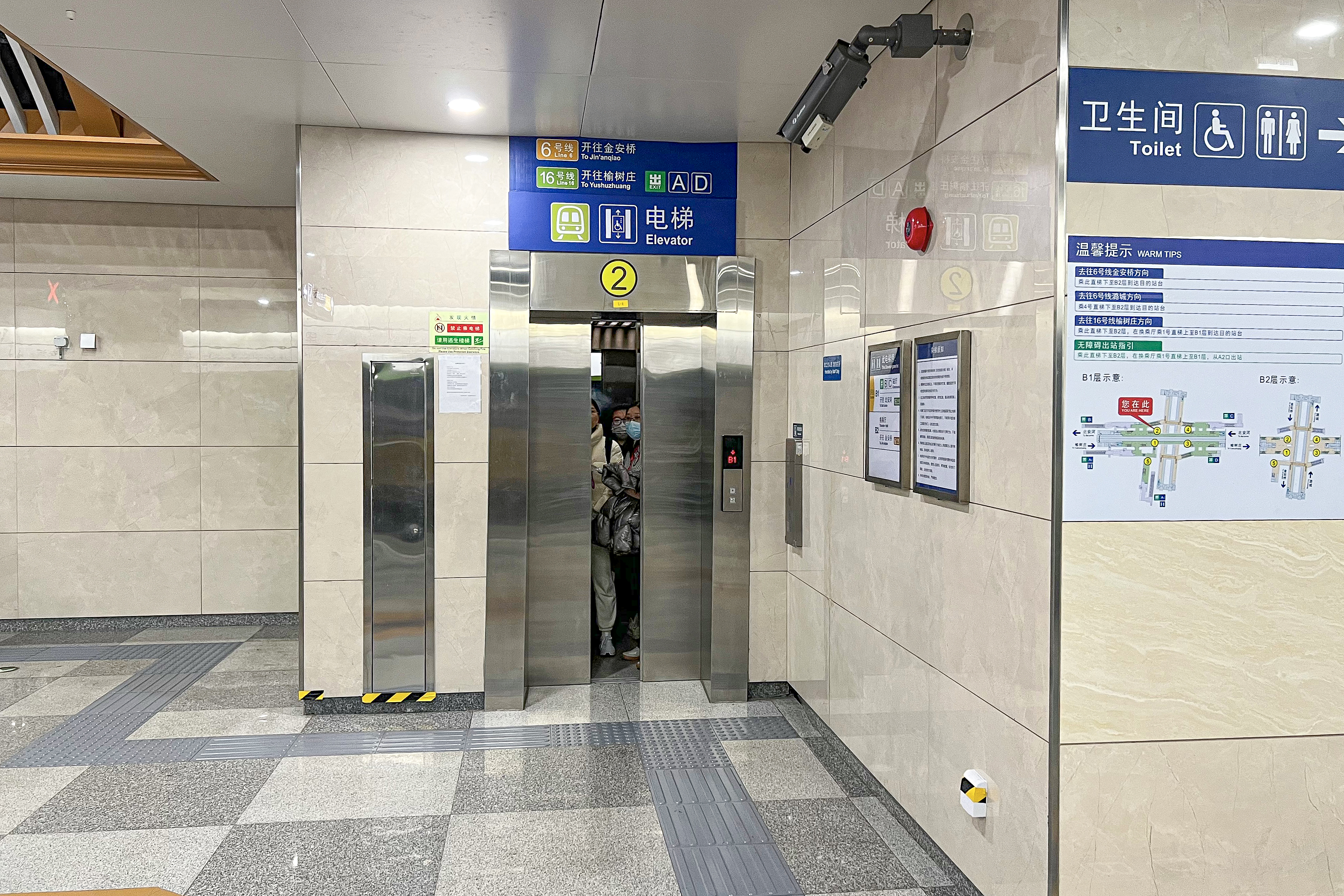
Lift 2 at Line 16 northbound platform

=== Line 6 reserved platforms during construction ===
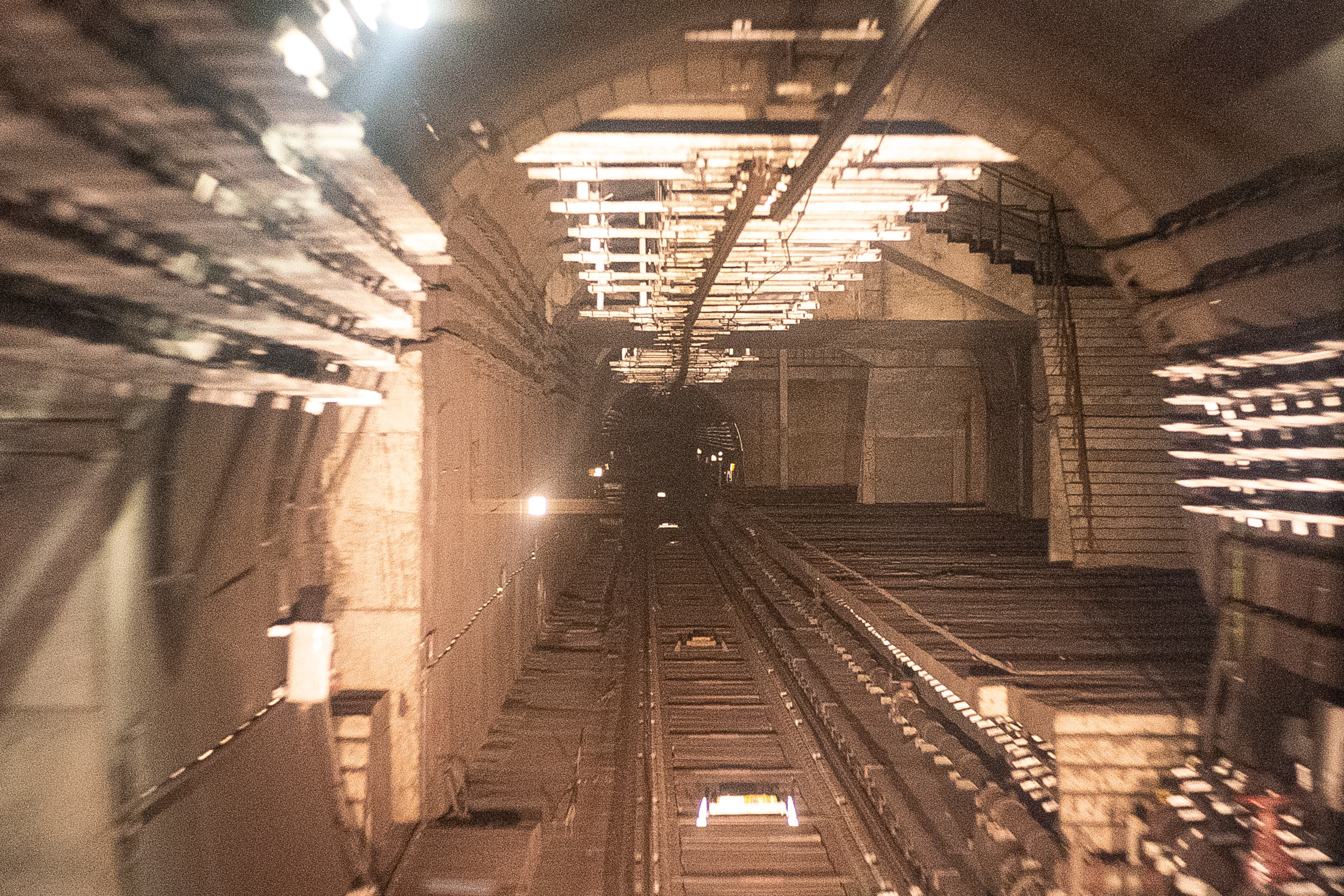
Reserved platform structure in the westbound tunnel of Line 6 (September 2021)

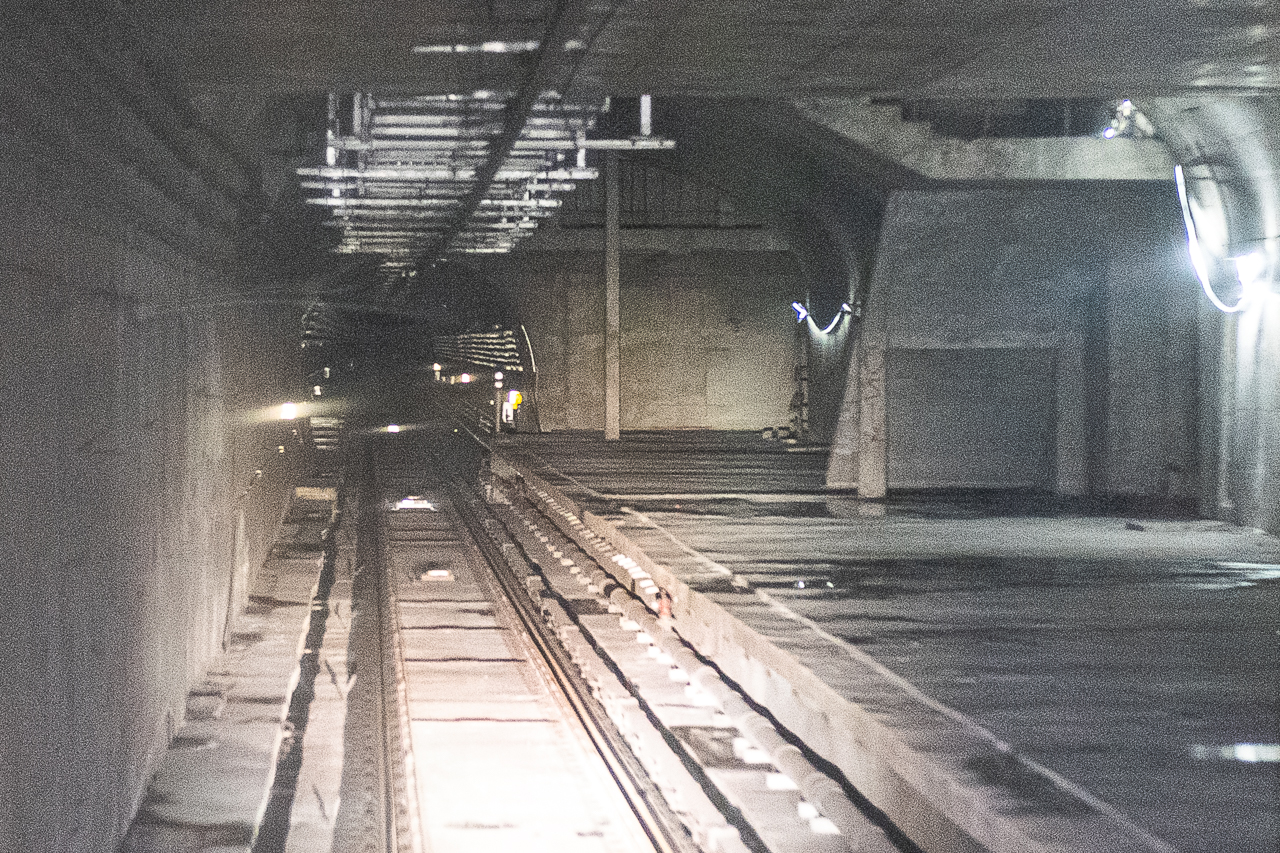
Reserved platform structure of Line 6 where site lighting strips have been installed (December 2021)

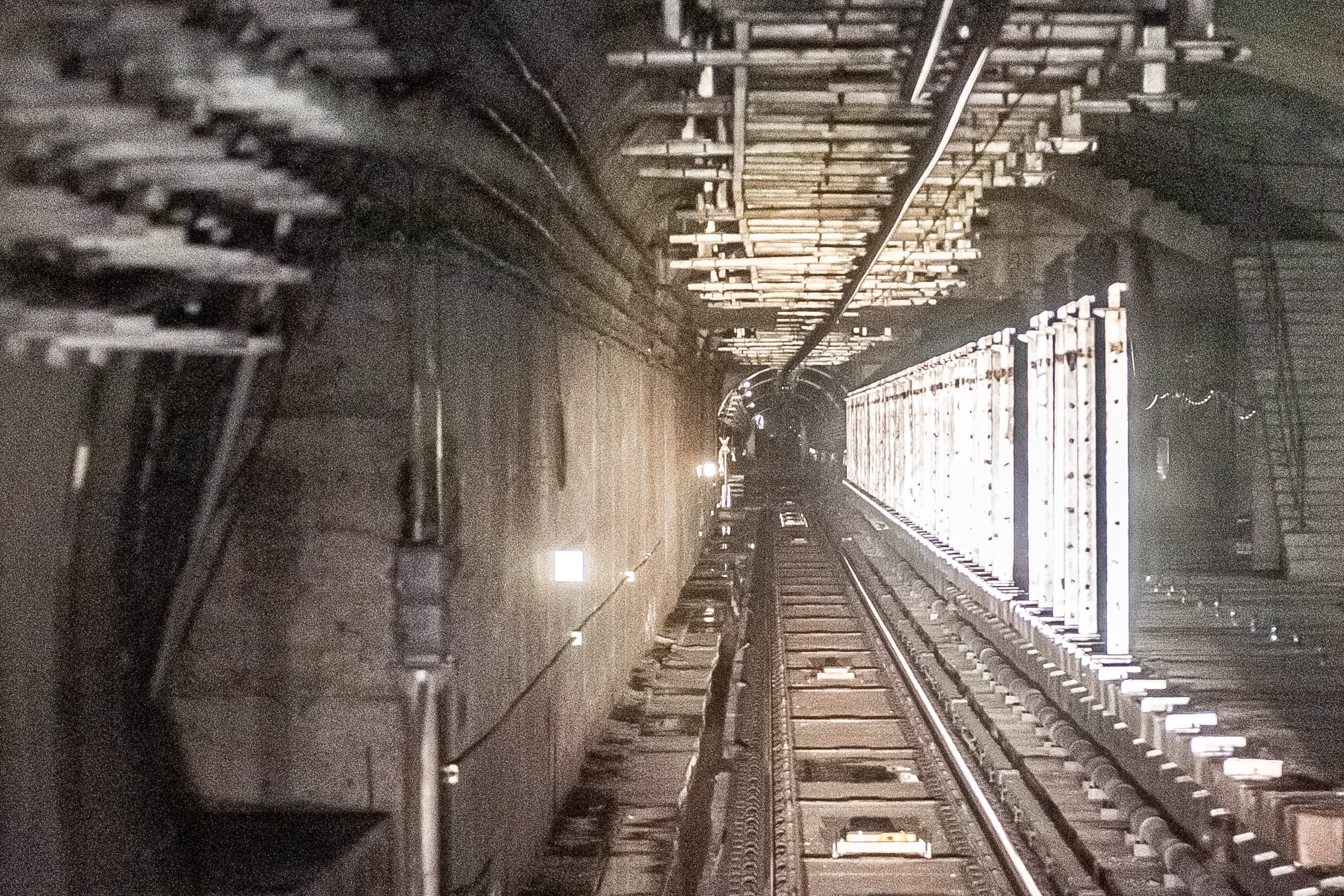
The installation of screen doors has started at the reserved platform structure in the eastbound tunnel of Line 6, and the previously installed site lighting strips are still visible (June 2022)

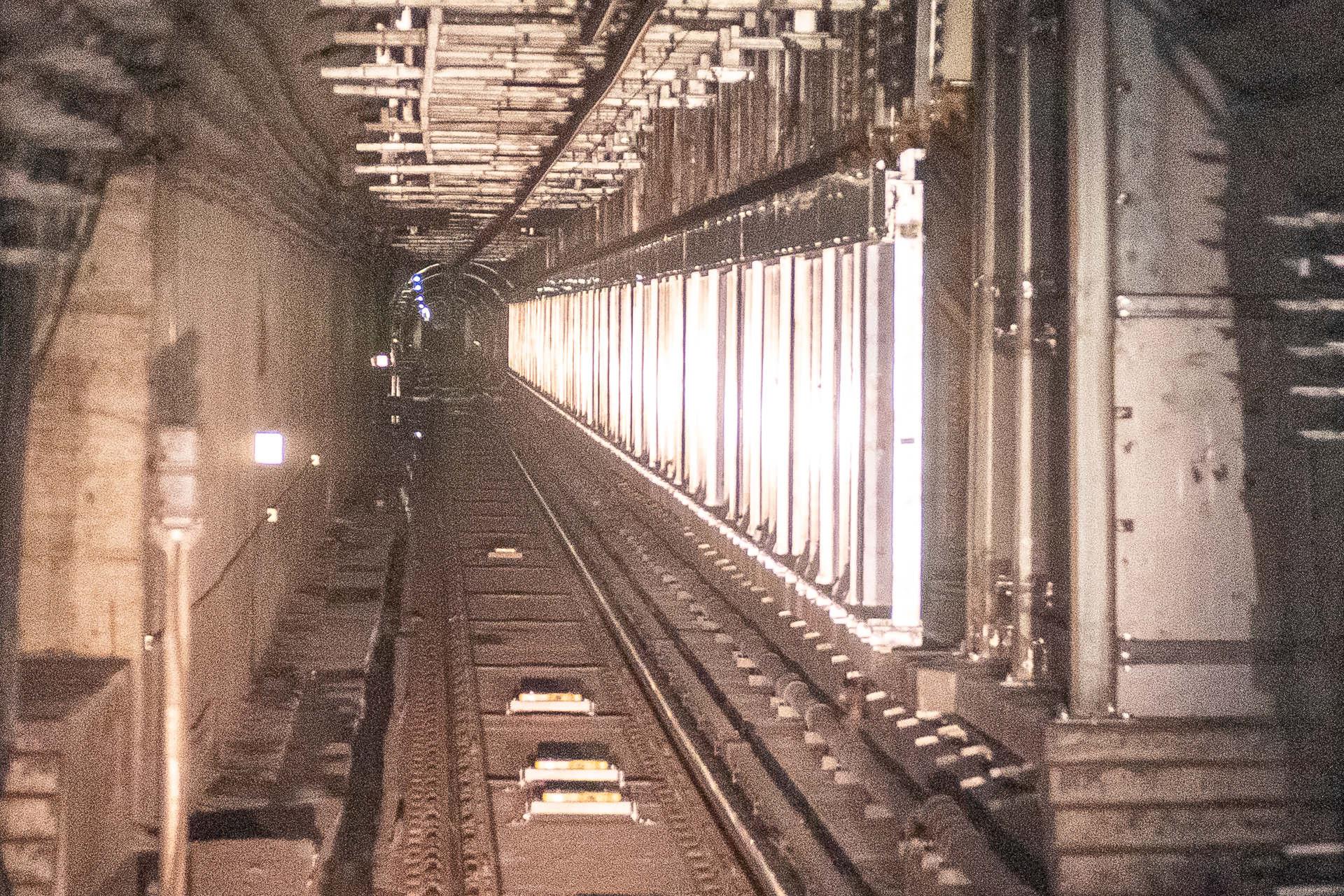
Reserved platform structure in the Line 6 eastbound tunnel, screen doors installed (September 2022)
