= Yuyuantan Dongmen (Yuyuantan Park East Gate) station =

Beijing Subway Line 16 station

Yuyuantan Dongmen (Yuyuantan Park East Gate) 玉渊潭东门
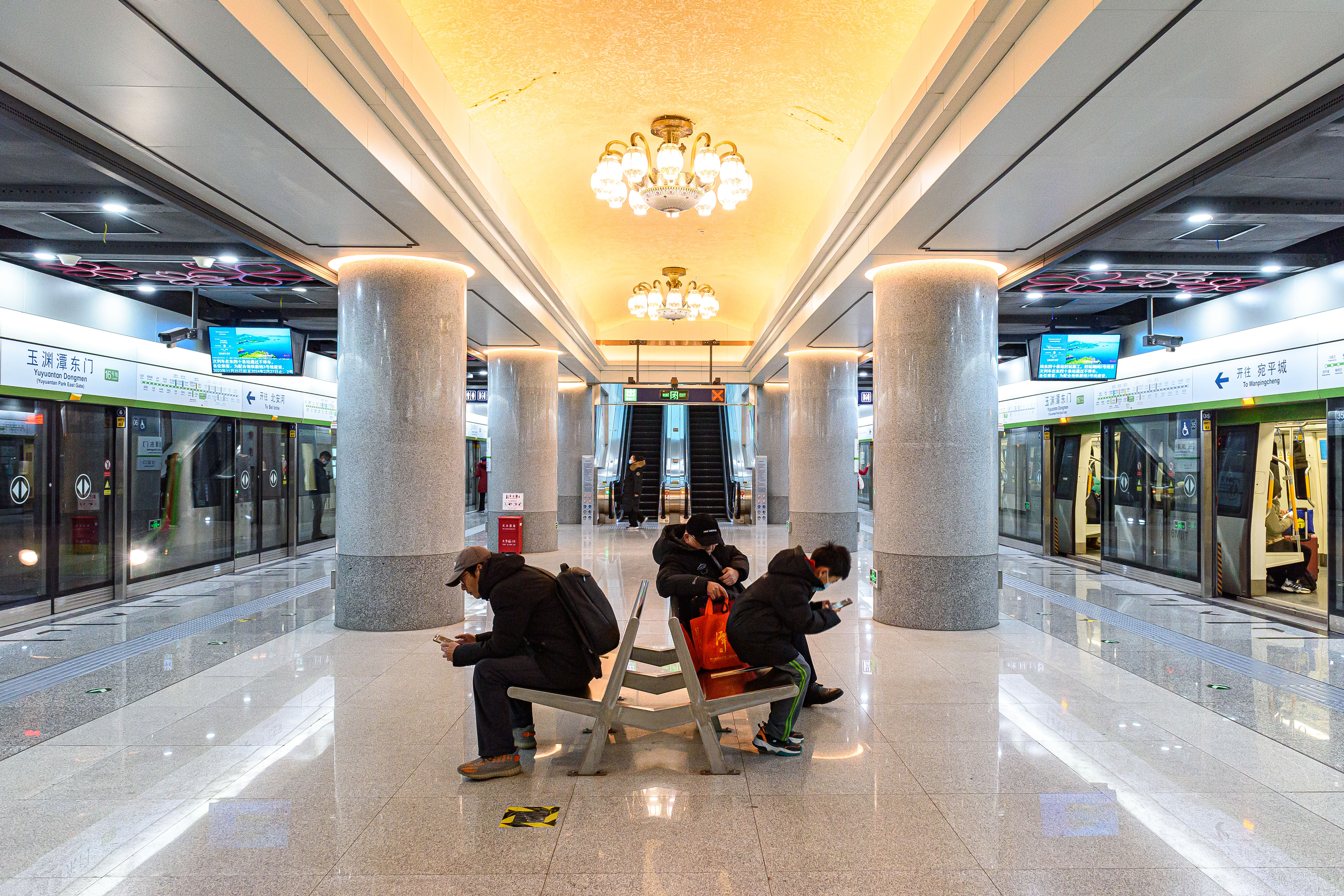
- Platform

General information
- Location: Intersection of Sanlihe Rd. and Yuetan South St., Haidian and Xicheng districts, Beijing; China
- Coordinates: 39°54′47″N 116°19′44″E
- Operator: Beijing MTR Metro Line 16 Corp., Ltd.
- Line: Line 16
- Platforms: 2 (1 island platform)
- Tracks: 2

Construction
- Structure type: Underground
- Accessible: Yes

History
- Opened: December 31, 2021; 4 years ago

Services
Preceding station	Beijing Subway	Following station
Ganjia Kou towards Bei'anhe	Line 16	Muxidi towards Wanpingcheng
Location

Yuyuantan Dongmen (Yuyuantan Park East Gate) station (Chinese: 玉渊潭东门站; pinyin: Yùyuāntán Dōngmén zhàn) is a station on Line 16 of the Beijing Subway. It is located near the East Gate of Yuyuantan Park. The station opened on 31 December 2021. It was the southern terminus of the line before the southern section to Yushuzhuang opened on 31 December 2022.

== Station layout ==
The station has an underground island platform. There are 3 exits, lettered B, C and D. Exit B is accessible via an elevator.

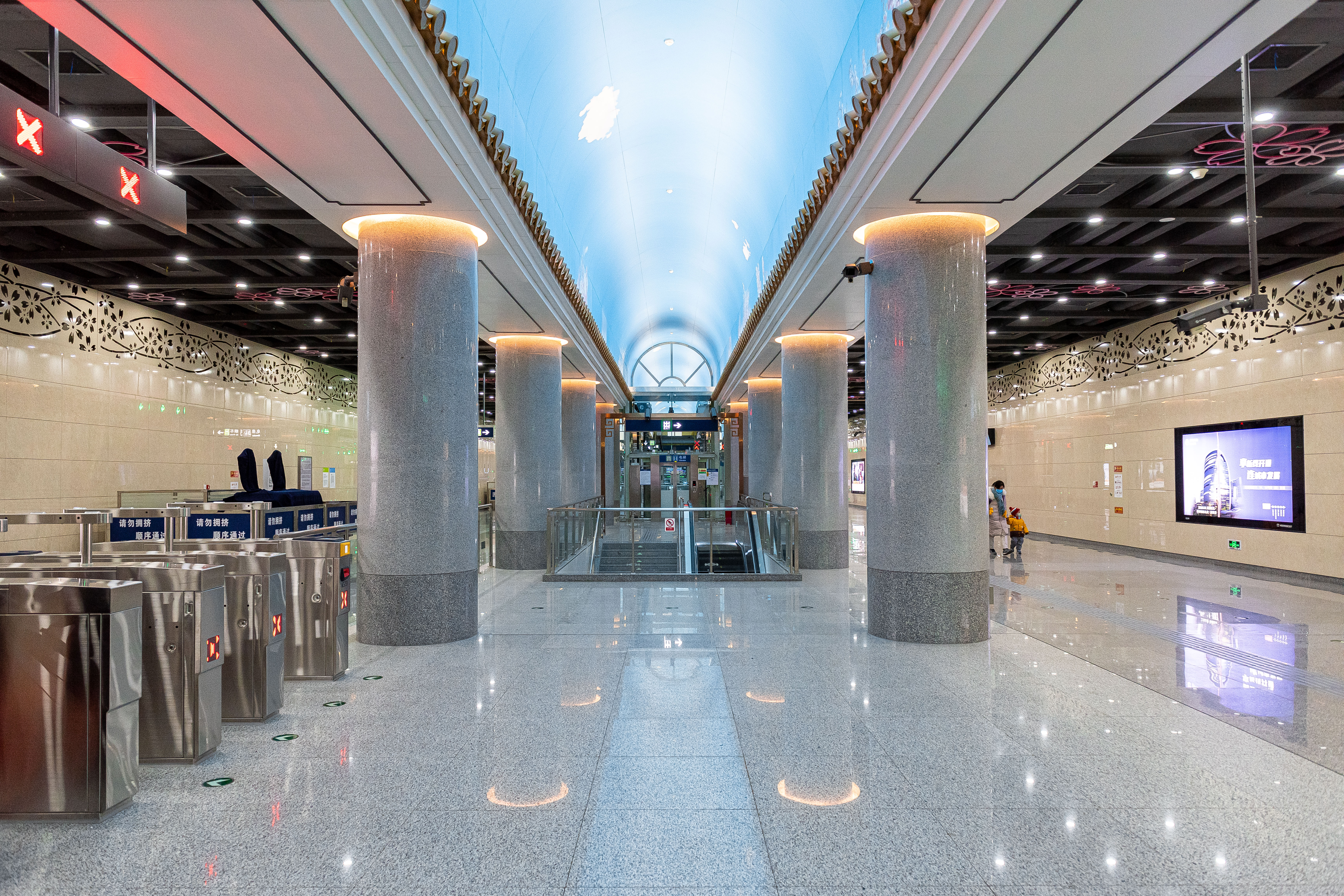
Concourse

== Near the station ==
- Yuyuantan Park (East Gate)
- Diaoyutai State Guesthouse
