= Diaoyutai State Guesthouse =

Diplomatic complex in Beijing, China

Coordinates: 39°55′0.83″N 116°19′40.51″E

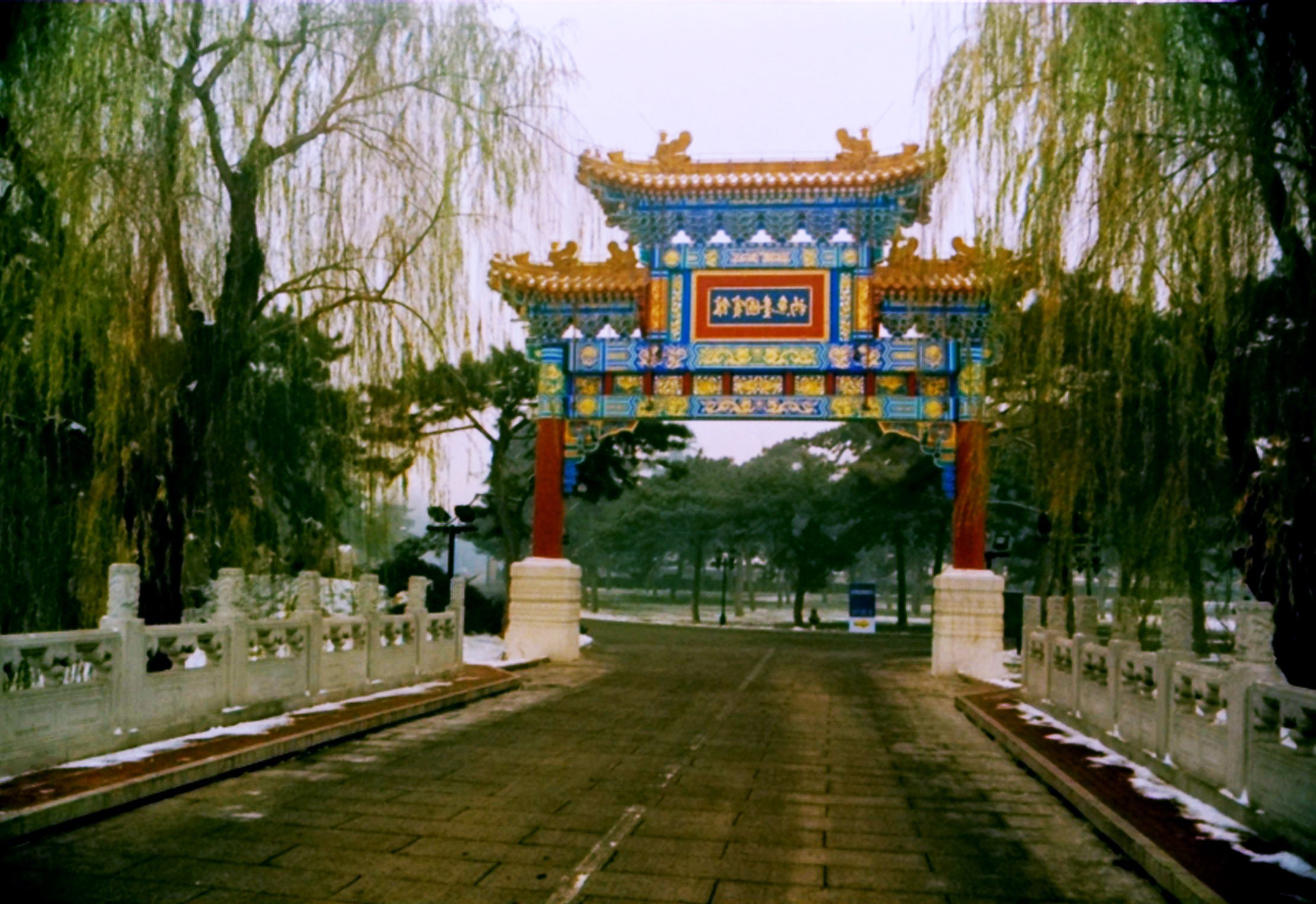
Entrance to the Diaoyutai State Guesthouse

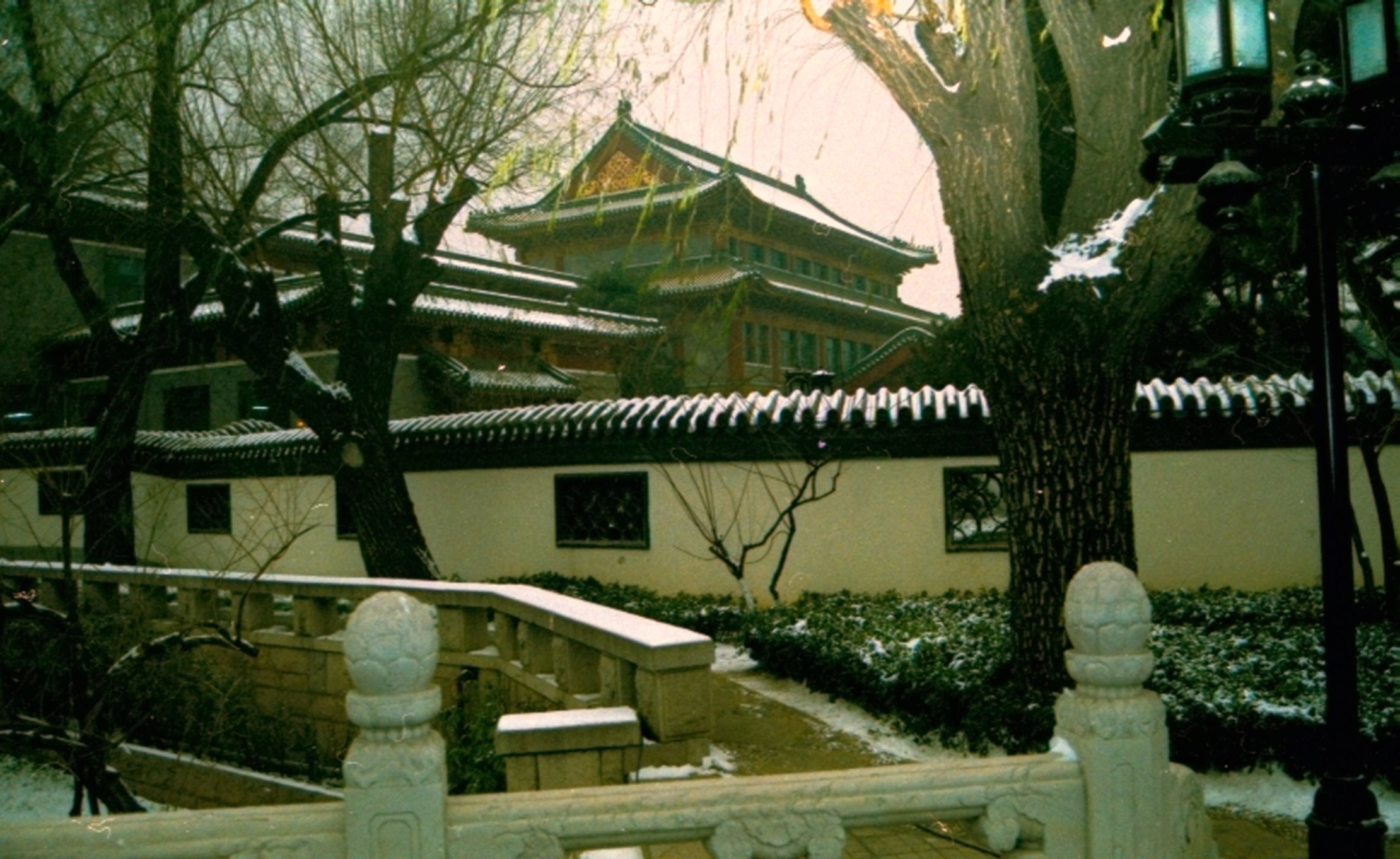
The Diaoyutai State Guesthouse

The Diaoyutai State Guesthouse (DSG; simplified Chinese: 钓鱼台国宾馆; traditional Chinese: 釣魚臺國賓館; pinyin: Diàoyútái Guóbīnguǎn) is an ancient royal garden and modern state guesthouse-complex located on the east side of Yuyuantan Park in Haidian District, Beijing, China. Emperor Zhangzong of Jin once built a fishing platform here, thus the name "Diaoyutai", which has a history of more than 800 years. During the Qing dynasty, the Qianlong Emperor ordered to dredge the Yuyuantan and build a palace here, which was then turned into a royal garden. The modern State Guesthouse Park was built by the government of the People's Republic of China in 1958–1959 on the basis of the ancient Diaoyutai Scenic Spot, as a place for visiting dignitaries to stay and for meetings and conferences. Diaoyutai State Guesthouse is located outside Fuchengmen in western Beijing, east of Yuyuantan, southwest of the intersection of Fucheng Road and Sanlihe Road.

The State Guesthouse Park is about 1 kilometer long from north to south and 0.5 kilometer wide from east to west, with a total area of 420,000 square meters, a total building area of 165,000 square meters and a lake area of 50,000 square meters. Landmarks in the vicinity of Diaoyutai State Guesthouse include the Naval General Hospital (now The Sixth Medical Center of the General Hospital of the Chinese People's Liberation Army), State Administration of Foreign Exchange, China Central Radio and Television Tower, China Central Television (CCTV), China Millennium Monument, State Administration of Taxation, China Railway Corporation, Military Museum, National Bureau of Statistics, and Hong Kong and Macao Affairs Office of the State Council.

== Layout ==
The guesthouse is located in Beijing's Haidian District, to the west of Sanlihe Road and to the east of Yuyuantan Park. The compound includes guesthouses connected by waterways, lakes, and traditional-style arched bridges.

== History ==
Emperor Zhangzong of Jin once built a fishing platform here, which gave the name of "Diaoyutai" and has a history of more than 800 years. In 1763, the old site of the Yuzao Pond was dredged into a lake, and the water of Xiangshan Mountain was introduced to the moat outside the Fuchengmen Gate, which was called "Yuyuantan". In 1774, the imperial edict was issued to build the Diaoyutai, Qianlong Emperor inscribed "Diaoyutai" on it.

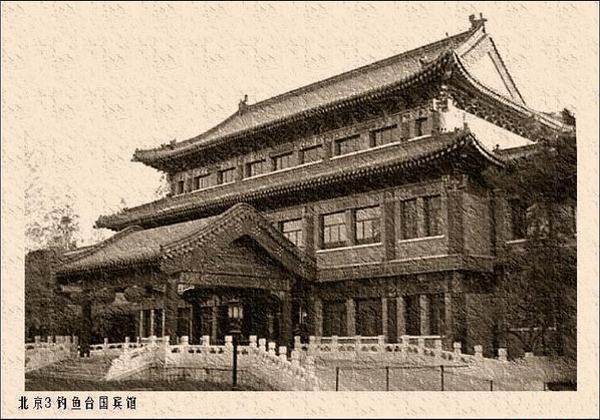
Diaoyutai State Guesthouse in 1959

The Government of China, Chairman of the Chinese Communist Party Mao Zedong and Premier Zhou Enlai, in order to celebrate the 10th anniversary of the founding of the People's Republic of China, and to receive foreign heads of state and government coming to China to participate in the National Day, they chose the site of the ancient Diaoyutai scenic spot in 1958, and instructed the Ministry of Foreign Affairs to organize, plan, and build a state guesthouse, which was named as the Diaoyutai State Guesthouse.

In early 1966, Peng Zhen (then head of the five-member team of the Cultural Revolution) had organized a writing team here to draft the February Outline. During the Cultural Revolution, it became the office of the Central Cultural Revolution Group (Building 14 and 16), while Kang Sheng (Building 8), Chen Boda (Building 15), Jiang Qing (Building 5, then Building 11, then Building 10), Zhang Chunqiao, Yao Wenyuan (Building 9), and Guan Feng all lived here centrally as well, and Diaoyutai became the residence for the office and life of the members of the Central Cultural Revolution Leading Group.

After the Ninth National Congress, the influence of the Central Committee's Cultural Revolution Group gradually faded out, and the political operation gradually returned to normal, and this place became the centralized residence of the members of the Gang of Four. Later Wang Hongwen lived in Building 16; Ji Dengkui, Chen Yonggui, Wu Guixian and other Politburo members who rose in the Cultural Revolution also lived here. In 1975, Chen Yonggui wrote a petition requesting to move out of the Diaoyutai State Guesthouse to an old courtyard house in Jiaodaokou. Mao Zedong said "very good, Diaoyutai has no fish to fish". So the members of the Politburo of the Central Committee who lived in the Diaoyutai State Guesthouse moved out successively. Only Jiang Qing moved to Zhongnanhai after Mao's death in 1976.

During Deng Xiaoping's administration, the Central Committee of the Chinese Communist Party and State Council still entertained foreign guests visiting China. After the reform and opening up of China, it began to diversify its business and was first officially opened to the public in 1980.

== Buildings ==
The Diaoyutai State Guesthouse was first constructed in October 1958 and was fully completed in August 1959. As the official state guesthouse, and out of respect for the customs of foreign guests, the complex does not include buildings #1 or #13.

=== Building #2 ===
Building #2, with the Diaoyutai Center Lake in the west, the Cherry Garden in the south, and adjacent to the Presidential Building #18, is equipped with 27 sets of head suites, deluxe suites, ordinary rooms and standard rooms, large and small meeting rooms, banquet halls and four-seasons halls. The building can receive all kinds of delegations and tours, organize small and medium-sized banquets, and also cooperate with the Building #18 to receive large governmental delegations.

In 1985, the negotiations between China and Britain on the Hong Kong issue took place in Building #2.

=== Building #3 ===
Building #3 is located in the center of the State Guesthouse, adjacent to the Club in the north, surrounded by the lake, flowers, plants and trees, with a very beautiful environment. The indoor banquet hall, large and small living rooms and luxurious guest rooms are set up, which is an ideal comprehensive reception building.

=== Building #4 ===
Bafangyuan (八芳苑), or Building #4, is located in the northeast corner of the hotel campus and was once the place where Premier Zhou Enlai had his office and met with foreign guests.

=== Building #5 ===
Building #5 is located in the northern center of the hotel park, which is the venue for many state affairs activities. There are twenty-four suites in Building #5, including the Head Suite, Deluxe Suite, Ordinary Suite and Standard Rooms, Meeting Room, Negotiation Room, Banquet Room and Hundred People's Room. Chinese leaders often hold state affairs activities here.

In March 1970, a coup d'état in Cambodia deposed Prince Sihanouk as head of state. Despite the coup d'état, Zhou Enlai received Sihanouk with the same courtesy as a head of state. Sihanouk lived in Building 5, Zhou made elaborate arrangements for this purpose: antiques, paintings, all kinds of elegant, neat furniture. In addition, specifically for Sihanouk's wife Princess Monique selected a number of reliable service personnel.

On July 9, 1971, Dr. Henry Kissinger visited China secretly as a prelude to U.S. President Richard Nixon's visit to China and resided in Building #5. At about 4:00 p.m., Premier Zhou Enlai came and shook hands with Kissinger "This is the first time in 29 years that senior officials of China and the United States have shaken hands." On 20 July 2023, Henry Kissinger visited China again, and General Secretary of the Chinese Communist Party Xi Jinping met with him at Building #5. Kissinger expressed his appreciation to Xi for choosing the meeting venue, noting that it was the same place where he had first met Chinese leaders during his initial visit to China decades earlier. During the luncheon, the Chinese side specially prepared longevity peaches, symbolizing respect for Kissinger's centenarian age and conveying best wishes for his health. This visit marked his final trip to China before his death.

The ceremony of the then Premier Li Peng, presenting the Certificate of Appointment to the first Chief Executive of the Hong Kong Special Administrative Region, Mr. Tung Chee-hwa, was held here.

=== Building #6 ===
Building #6 is located in the northwest corner of the Diaoyutai State Guesthouse, with the Yuyuantan Stream flowing past the front of the building, and a pool of blue water faintly visible through the dense woods. The interior decoration is simple and elegant, with strong national characteristics.

=== Building #7 ===
Building #7 has 14 guest rooms with European interiors.

=== Building #8 ===
Building #8 has a total of 27 guest rooms, plus large and small conference halls and banquet halls.

=== Building #9 ===
Building #9 is European style, located in the center of the hotel, mainly designed for living and working, holding various small banquets and conferences. During the Cultural Revolution, Wang Hongwen, Zhang Chunqiao, and Yao Wenyuan all resided in Building #9.

=== Building #10 ===
Building #10 has 23 guest rooms, plus large and small conference and banquet rooms. During the Cultural Revolution, Jiang Qing resided in Buildings #10 and #11.

=== Building #11 ===
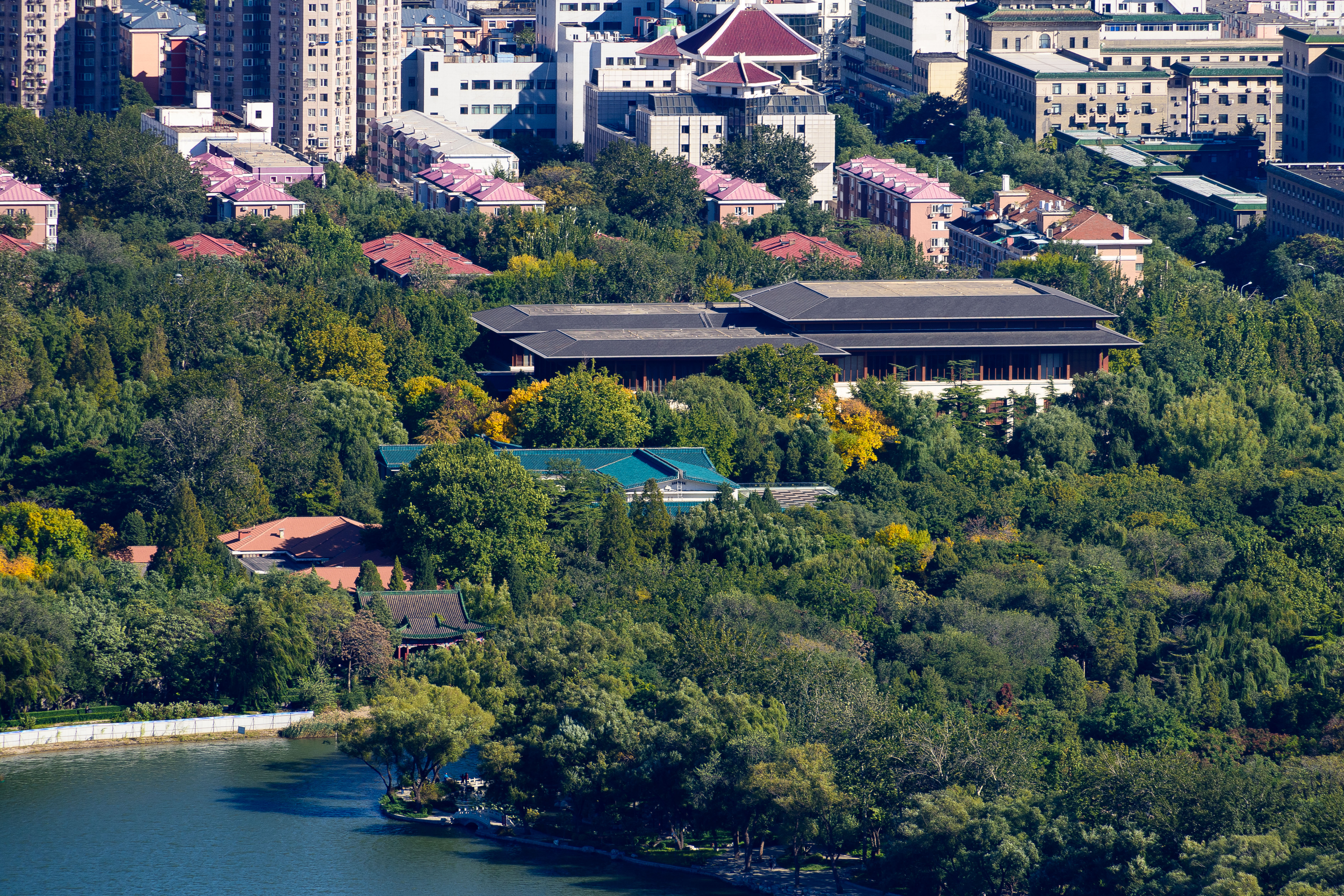
Buildings #11, #12 and #14 in the South

Building #11 has 26 guest rooms plus the Hall, large and small conference halls, banquet halls and the Four Seasons Hall; the style is a combination of Chinese and Western styles, mainly designed for organizing small and medium-sized banquets.

=== Building #12 ===
Building #12 is located in the middle of the southern part of the hotel park, looking at Fangfeiyuan (Building #17), with 17 presidential suites, luxury suites, ordinary suites, standard guest rooms, and set up a meeting room, negotiation hall, banquet hall, four seasons hall. The Four Seasons Hall is spacious and bright, with rockeries, streams, springs, pools and valuable flowers and trees.

Building #12 was once the residence of CCP Chairman Mao Zedong, as well as the place where U.S. President Reagan and British Prime Minister Margaret Thatcher stayed.

=== Building #14 ===
On May 13–15, 1992, the Vice-Minister of Foreign Affairs of the People's Republic of China, Xu Dunxin, Ambassador Zhang Ruijie, and Undersecretaries of the Ministry of Foreign Affairs of the Republic of Korea, Roh Chang-hee (노창희) and Kwon Byeong-hyun (권병현), held the first round of pragmatic negotiations on the establishment of diplomatic relations in the Building #14, where the first round of negotiations ended inconclusively. To ensure the confidentiality of issues, the two sides agreed that the second round of negotiations still be held in Building #14.

=== Building #15 ===
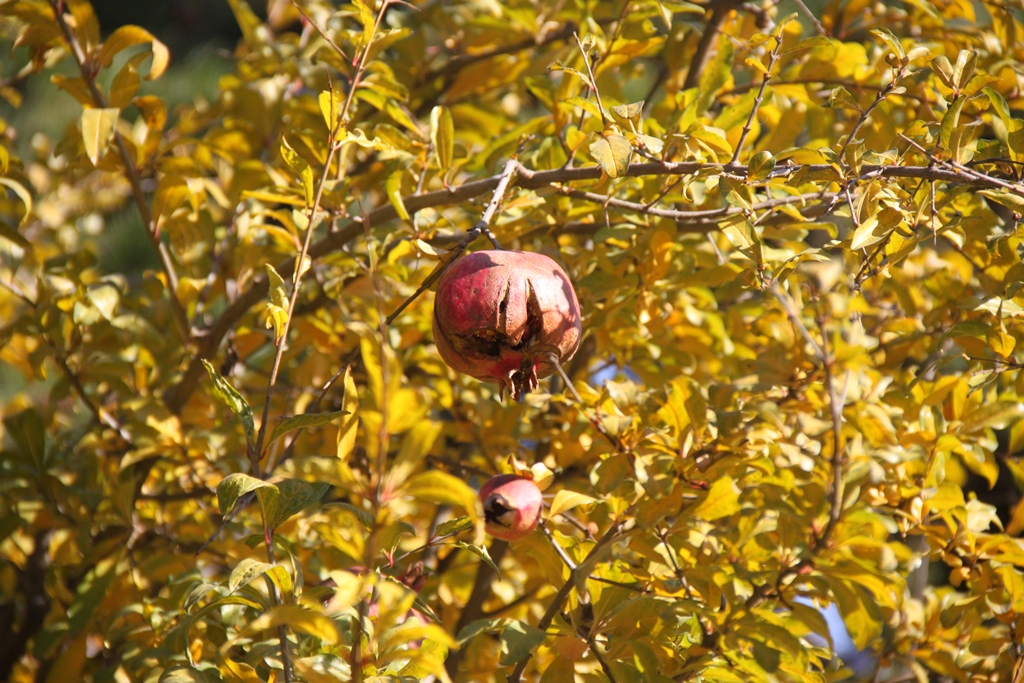
pomegranates in Danruo Garden

Building #15 has 17 guest rooms, large and small conference halls and banquet halls, as well as the "Danruo Garden" (Chinese: 丹若园), a garden within the pavilion where pomegranates are planted throughout.

=== Building #16 ===
Building #16, located at the East Gate of Diaoyutai, is a comprehensive reception building with a banquet hall, a living room and luxurious guest rooms.

=== Building #17 / Fangfeiyuan ===
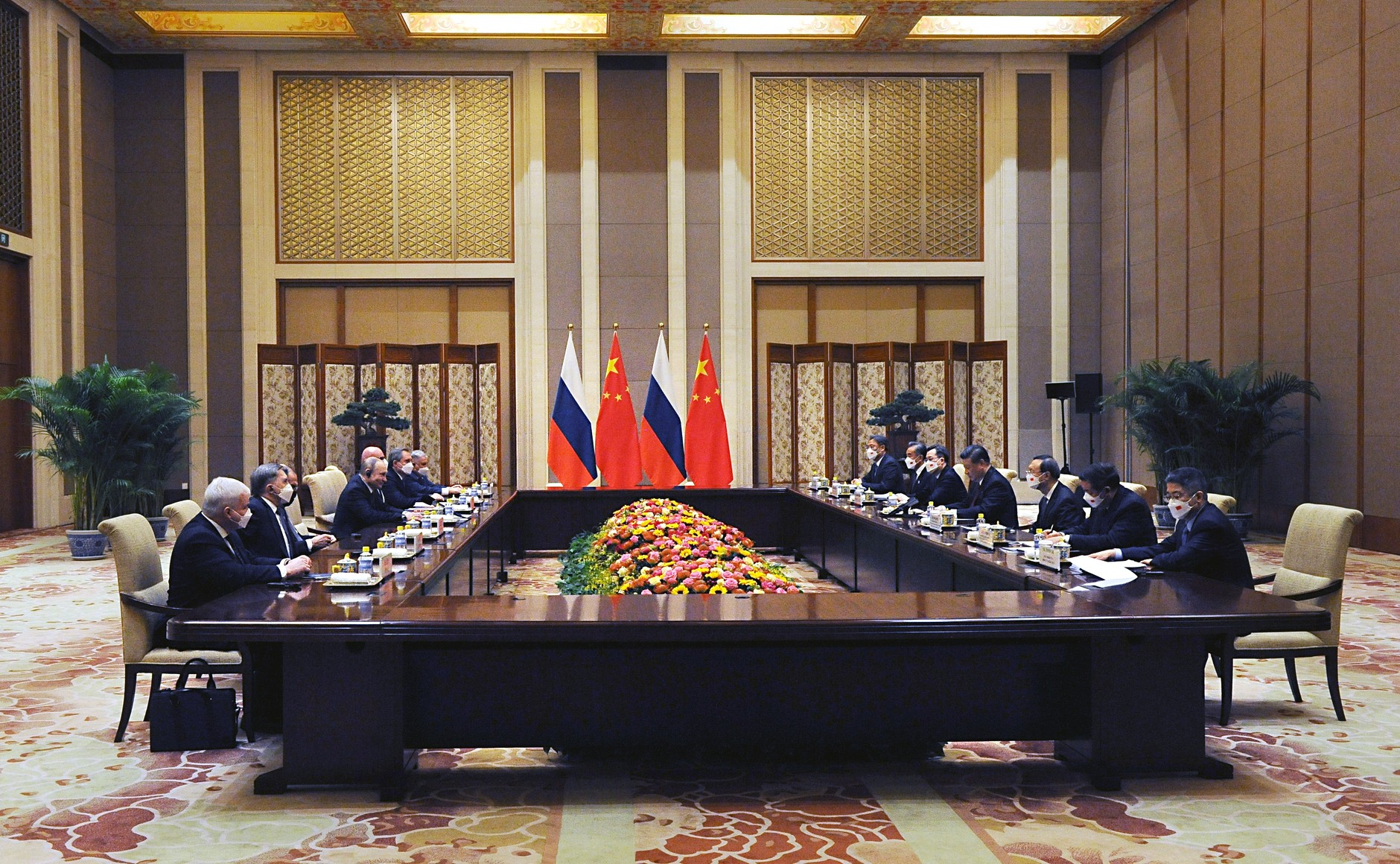
Russian president Vladimir Putin held talks in Fangfeiyuan with Chinese leader Xi Jinping in 2022

Fangfeiyuan, also Building #17, hosts large conferences, press conferences, receptions, and banquets. The China-United States-Russia-North Korea-South Korea-Japan Six-Party Heads of State Meeting at the Beijing Six-Party Talks, hosted by China and aimed at resolving the nuclear issue on the Korean Peninsula, was also held at Fangfeiyuan/Building #17.

Premier Li Keqiang attends the Inaugural Meeting of the Board of Governors of the Asian Infrastructure Investment Bank (AIIB) and delivers a speech at Fanghuayuan on January 16, 2016. On November 1, 2022, Premier Li Keqiang meets with Nguyen Phu Trong, General Secretary of the Communist Party of Vietnam, who is in China for an official visit, at Diaoyutai Fanghuayuan.

In 2022, the Russian president Vladimir Putin came to China to attend the opening ceremony of the Beijing Winter Olympics, held a "New Year's meeting" here with Chinese leader Xi Jinping.

=== Building #18 ===
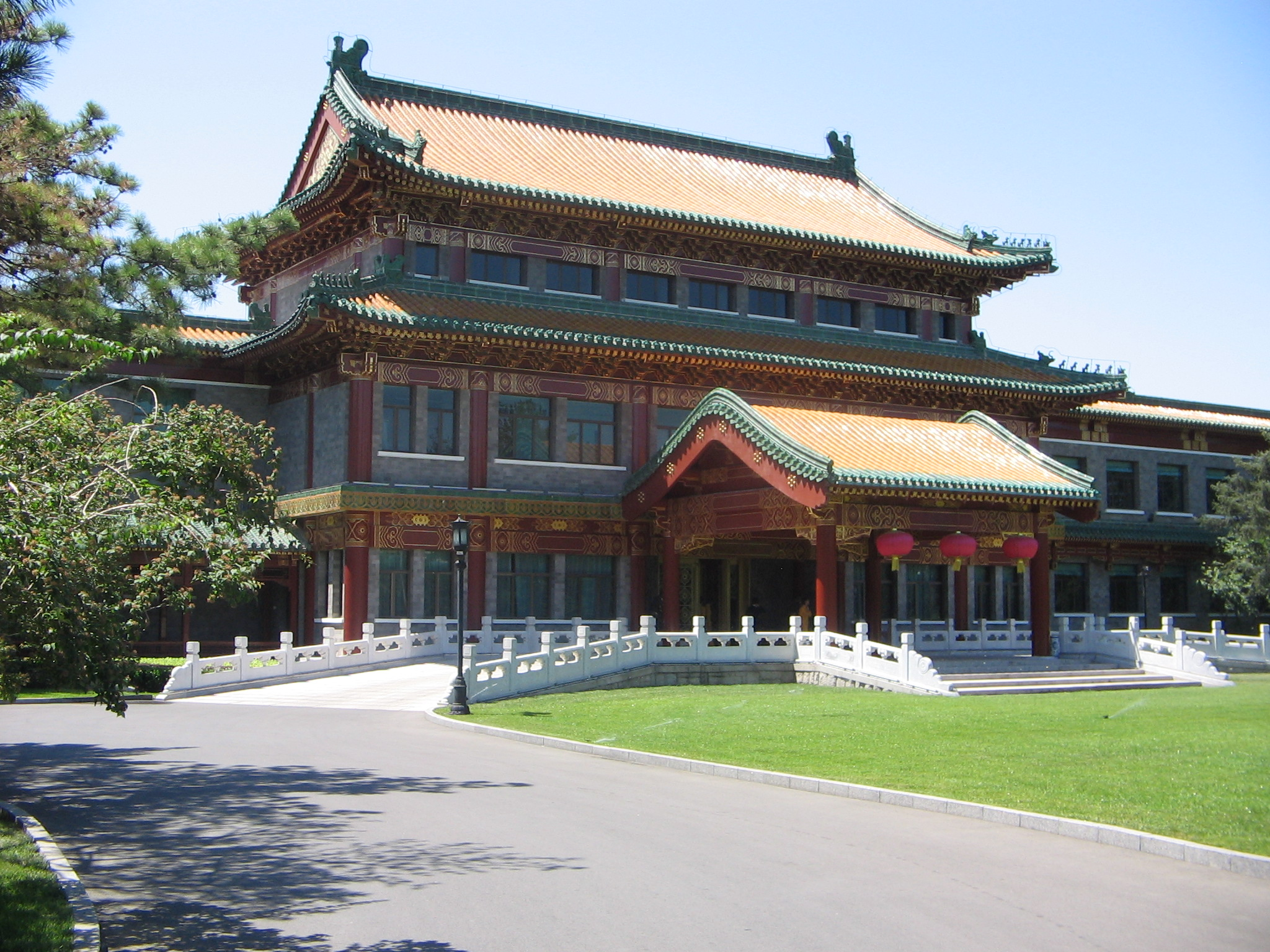
Building #18 in 2010

Building #18, with its faux Ming-style architecture, is located in the center of Diaoyutai, on the north side of the central lake. Most of the foreign heads of state stay in the 18th building.

In 1959, on the eve of the 10th anniversary of the People's Republic of China, Nikita Khrushchev, who led the Soviet Union delegation, planted a commemorative tree symbolizing peace and friendship in front of Building #18.

On February 21, 1972, U.S. president Richard Nixon visited China and stayed in the 18th building. On February 23, Zhou Enlai and Nixon shifted the venue of their meeting to the 18th building and began to discuss the drafting of the Joint Communiqué of the United States of America and the People's Republic of China.

In September 1972, Japanese prime minister Kakuei Tanaka visited China. In Building 18, he and Premier Zhou Enlai signed an agreement on the normalization of diplomatic relations between China and Japan, starting the first page of Sino-Japanese friendship. In October 1986, Queen Elizabeth of the United Kingdom, who was the first head of state in British history to visit China and stayed at here. The U.S. president George H.W. Bush, the former head of the Soviet Union Mikhail Gorbachev, the Emperor and his wife of Japan, and the first Russian president Boris Yeltsin who visited China also stayed in Building #18.

North Korea's supreme leader Kim Jong-un stayed at the Guesthouse's No. 18 villa during his 2018 trip to China.

== Diaoyutai State Guesthouse Administration of the Ministry of Foreign Affairs ==
The Diaoyutai State Guesthouse Administration of the Ministry of Foreign Affairs, also operating under the name Diaoyutai State Guesthouse, is a public institution directly subordinate to the Ministry of Foreign Affairs of the People's Republic of China. It is responsible for the administration and management of the Diaoyutai State Guesthouse.

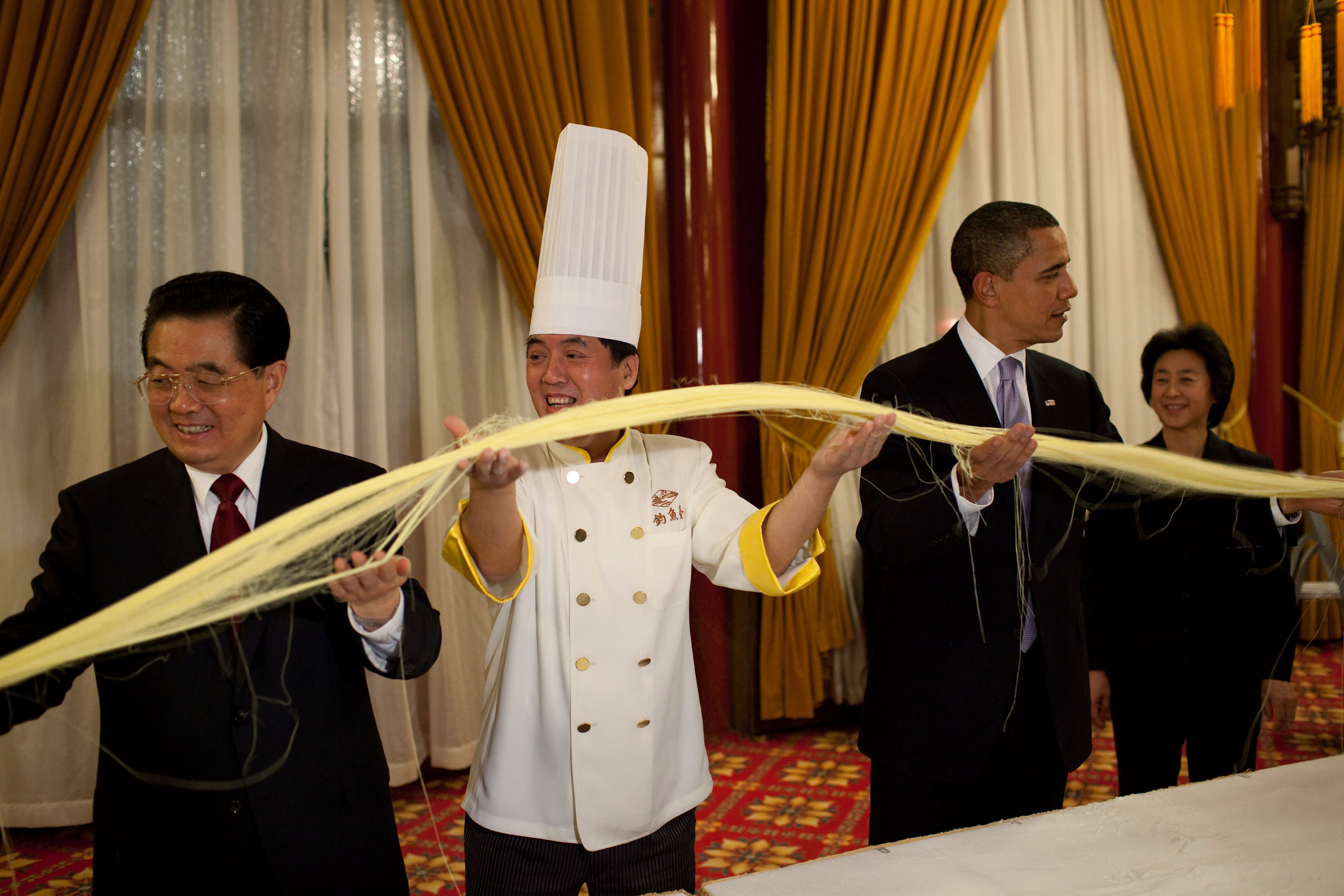
US President Barack Obama participates in a noodle-making demonstration with Chinese leader Hu Jintao at the Diaoyutai State Guest House on 16 November 2009

=== Organizational structure ===
The Diaoyutai State Guesthouse Administration of the Ministry of Foreign Affairs (Diaoyutai State Guesthouse) comprises the following departments and affiliated units:

- General Office
- Party Committee Office
- Personnel Division
- Security Division
- Finance Division
- Operations Division
- Public Relations Department
- Infrastructure and Electrical Division
- Administrative Division
- Supply Division
- Landscaping Division
- Grand Hotel
- Qianmen Hotel Administration Office
- Dongjiaomin Lane Administration Office
- Qiao Jianli Administration Office
- Retired Cadres Administration Office
- Development Company
- Diaoyutai International Travel Service
- Diaoyutai Villa
- Club
- Decoration Company

== Transport ==
- Yuyuantan Park East Gate station on Line 16 of Beijing Subway

== See also ==
- List of hotels in Beijing
- Jingxi Hotel
- Taipei Guest House
- Grand Hotel (Taipei)
