= Tundian station =

Beijing Subway station

Tundian 屯佃
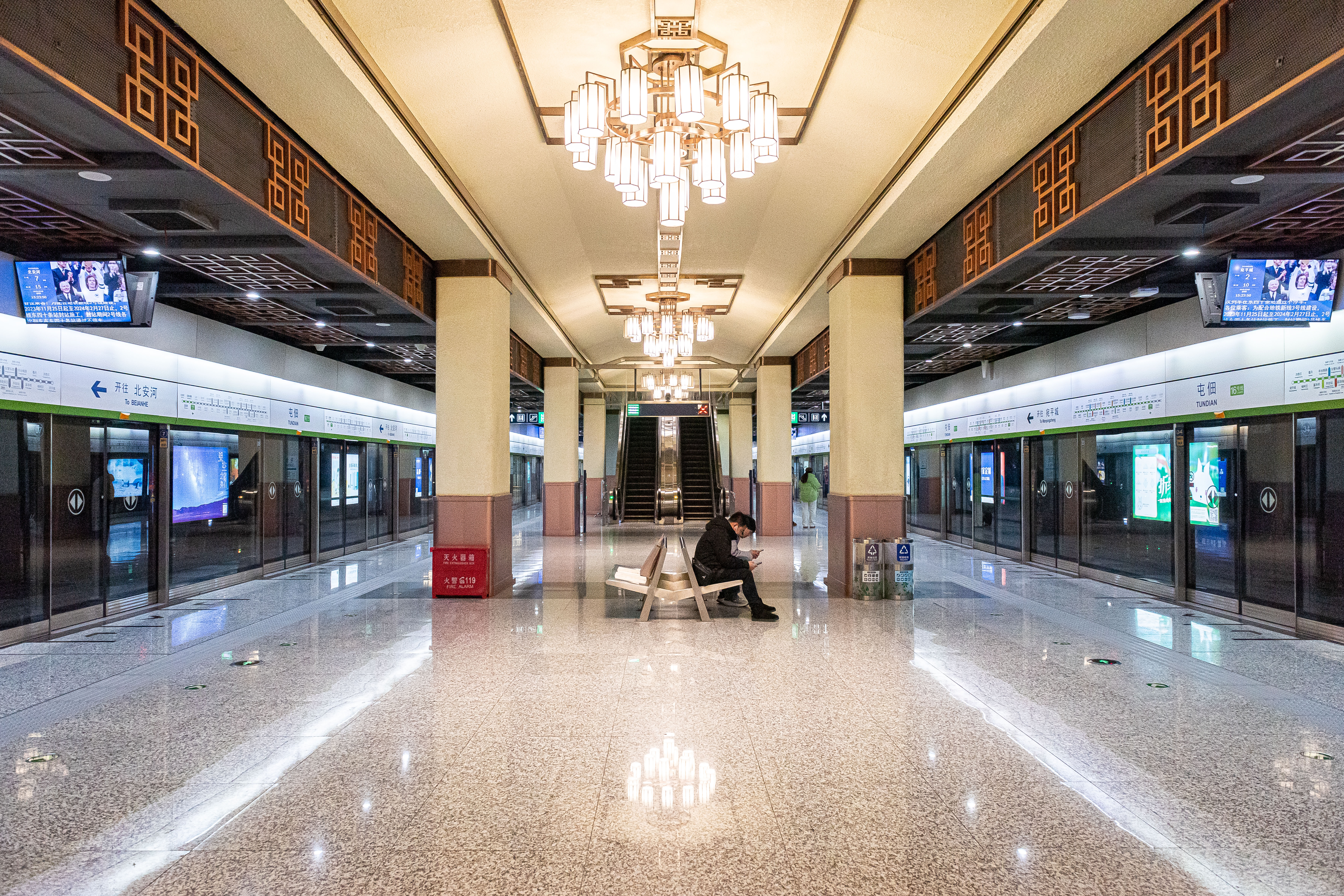
- Platform

General information
- Location: Beiqing Road (北清路) and Shangzhuang Road (上庄路); Tundian village, Xibeiwang Town, Haidian District, Beijing; China
- Coordinates: 40.0685°N 116.2150°E
- Operator: Beijing MTR Metro Line 16 Corp., Ltd.
- Line: Line 16
- Platforms: 2 (1 island platform)
- Tracks: 2

Construction
- Structure type: Underground
- Accessible: Yes

History
- Opened: December 31, 2016

Services
Preceding station	Beijing Subway	Following station
Daoxianghu Lu towards Bei'anhe	Line 16	Yongfeng towards Wanpingcheng
Location
- Location within Beijing

Tundian Station (Chinese: 屯佃站; pinyin: Túndiàn Zhàn) is a station on the Line 16 of the Beijing Subway. This station opened in December 2016.

This station will feature a 3-storey automatic park and ride system, thus becoming the first Beijing Subway station to equip an automatic parking system.

== Station layout ==
The station has an underground island platform.

== Exits ==
There are 3 exits, lettered A, C, and D. Exit C is accessible.

== Transport connections ==
=== Rail ===
Schedule as of December 2016:

Destination	First Train	Last Train
Line 16
to Bei'anhe	6.20am	11.15pm
to Xiyuan	5.35am	10.40pm
