= Daoxianghu Lu station =

Beijing Subway station

Daoxianghu Lu 稻香湖路
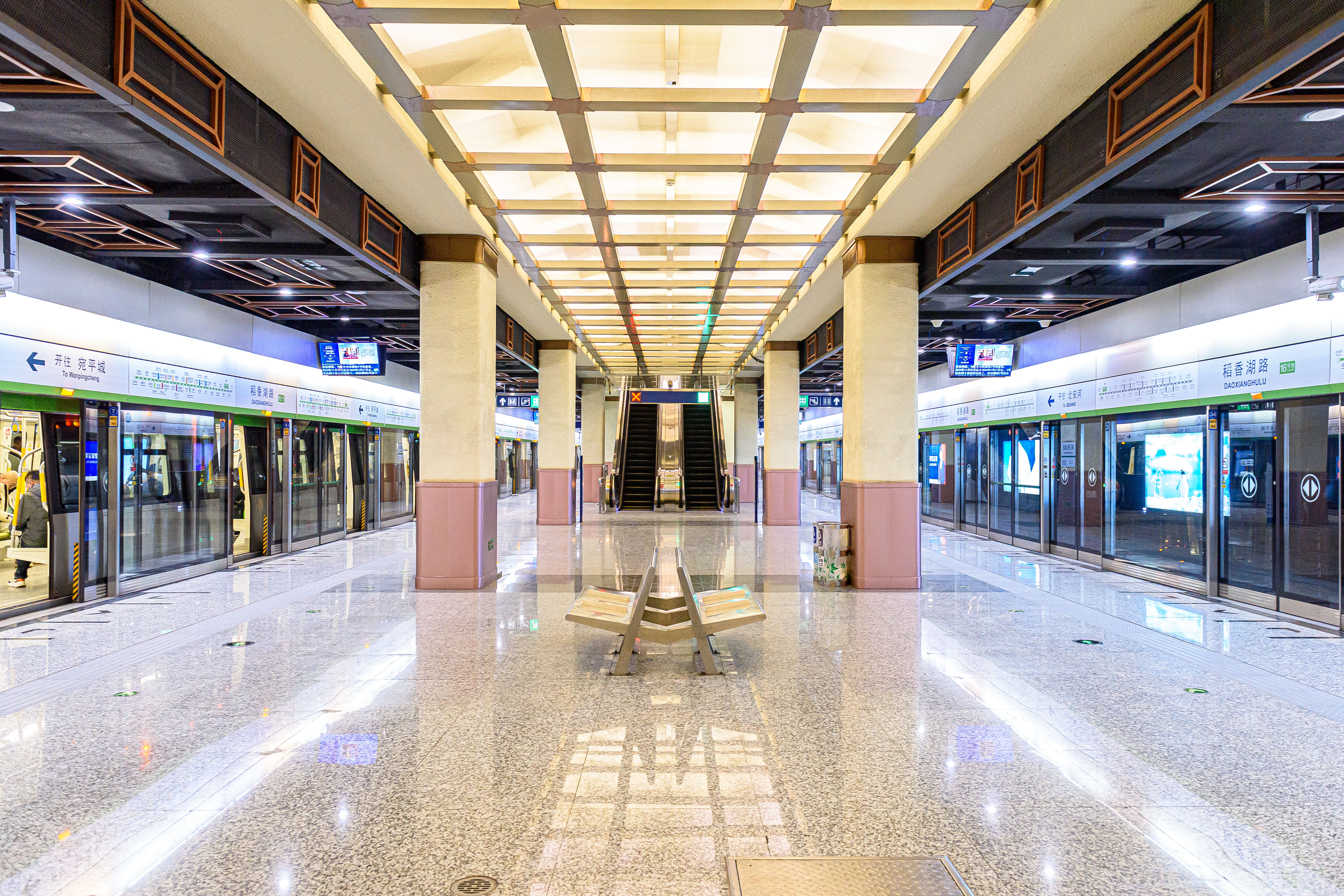
- Platform in January 2024

General information
- Location: Beiqing Road (北清路) and Daoxianghu Road (稻香湖路); Haidian District, Beijing; China
- Coordinates: 40.0689°N 116.1881°E
- Operator: Beijing MTR Metro Line 16 Corp., Ltd.
- Line: Line 16
- Platforms: 2 (1 island platform)
- Tracks: 2

Construction
- Structure type: Underground
- Accessible: Yes

History
- Opened: December 31, 2016

Services
Preceding station	Beijing Subway	Following station
Wenyang Lu towards Bei'anhe	Line 16	Tundian towards Wanpingcheng
Location
- Location within Beijing

Daoxianghu Lu Station (Chinese: 稻香湖路站; pinyin: Dàoxiānghú Lù Zhàn; lit. 'Daoxianghu Road') is a station on the Line 16 of the Beijing Subway. This station is opened in December 2016.

== Station layout ==
This station has an underground island platform.

== Exits ==
There are 3 exits, lettered C, D1, and D2. Exits D1 and D2 are accessible.

== Transport connections ==
=== Rail ===
Schedule as of December 2016:

Destination	First Train	Last Train
Line 16
to Bei'anhe	6.18am	11.57pm
to Wanpingcheng	5.19am	10.40pm
