= Xibeiwang station =

Beijing Subway station

Xibeiwang 西北旺
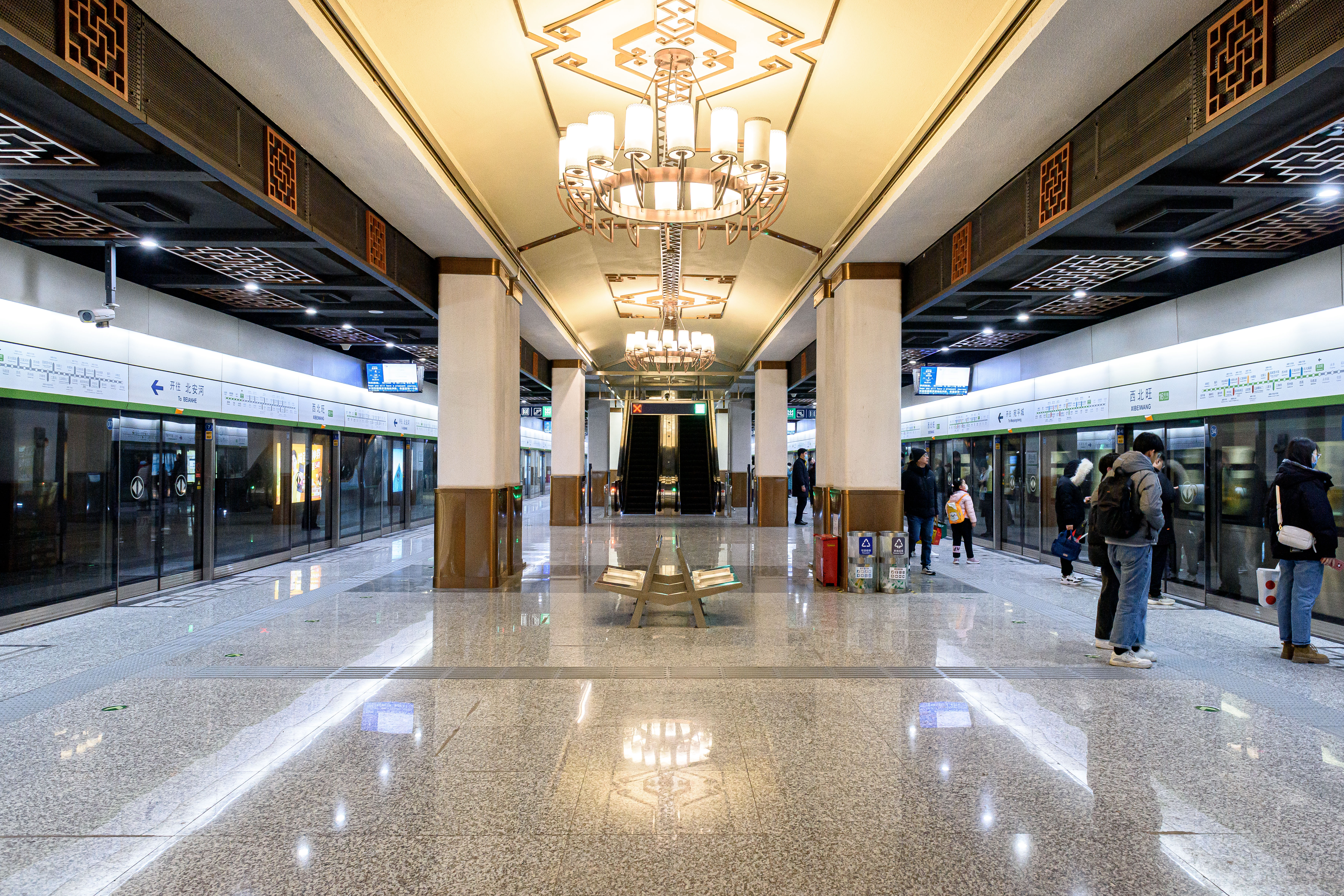
- Platform in December 2023

General information
- Location: Yongfeng Road (永丰路) and Houchangcun Road (后厂村路); Malianwa Subdistrict, Haidian District, Beijing; China
- Coordinates: 40°02′55″N 116°15′29″E
- Operator: Beijing MTR Metro Line 16 Corp., Ltd.
- Line: Line 16
- Platforms: 2 (1 island platform)
- Tracks: 2

Construction
- Structure type: Underground
- Accessible: Yes

History
- Opened: December 31, 2016

Services
Preceding station	Beijing Subway	Following station
Yongfeng Nan(S) towards Bei'anhe	Line 16	Malianwa towards Wanpingcheng
Location
- Location within Beijing

Xibeiwang Station (Chinese: 西北旺站; pinyin: Xīběiwàng Zhàn) is a station on the Line 16 of the Beijing Subway. It opened in December 2016.

== Station layout ==
The station has an underground island platform.

== Exits ==
There are 3 exits, lettered A, B, and C. Exit B is accessible.

== Timetable ==
Timetable as of January 2021:

Destination	First Train	Last Train
Line 16
to Bei'anhe	6:05 am	11:44 pm
to Wanpingcheng	5:31 am	10:52 pm
