= Wenyang Lu station =

Beijing Subway station

Wenyang Lu 温阳路
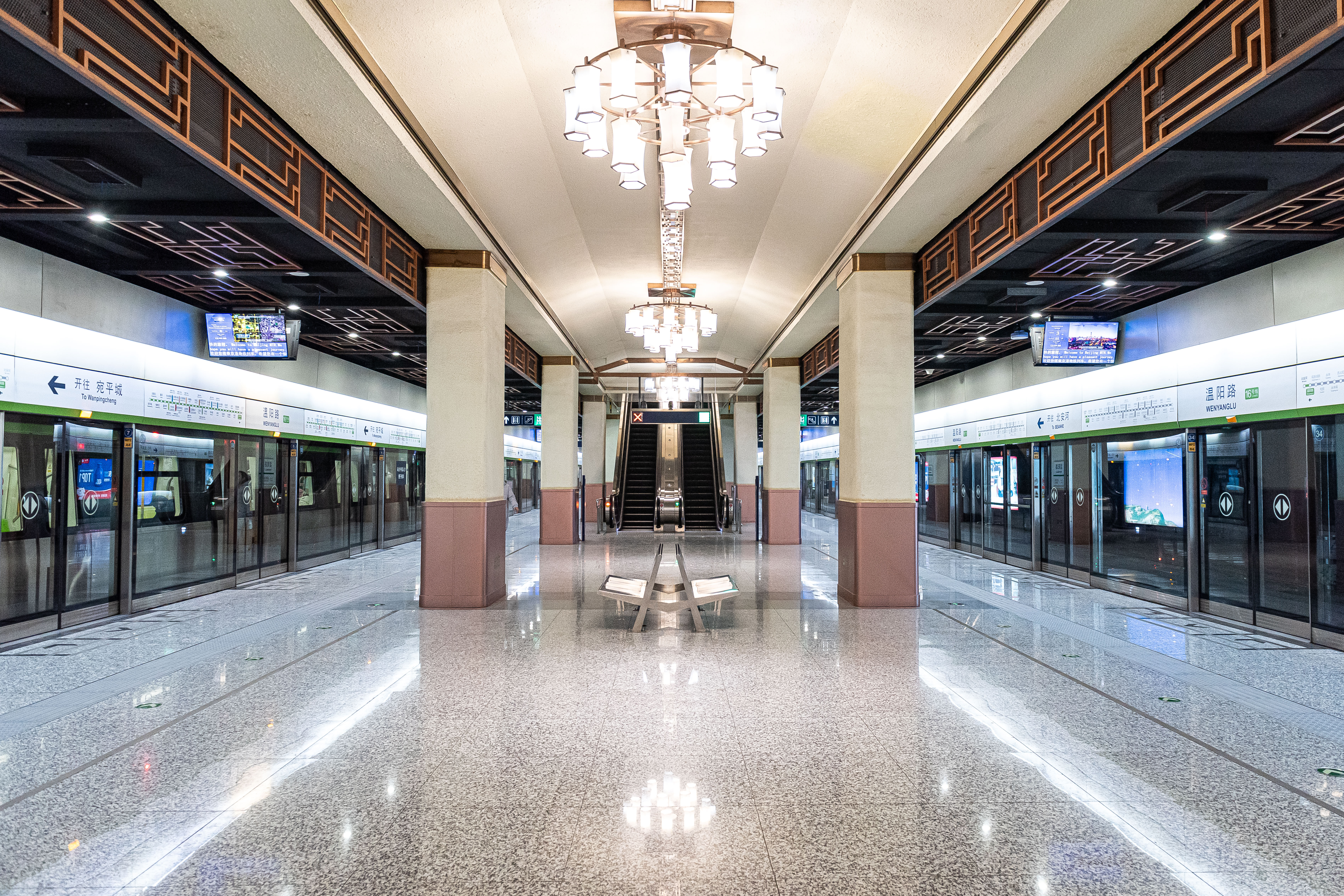
- Platform

General information
- Location: Beiqing Road (北清路) and Wenyang Road (温阳路); Haidian District, Beijing; China
- Coordinates: 40.0685°N 116.1613°E
- Operator: Beijing MTR Metro Line 16 Corp., Ltd.
- Line: Line 16
- Platforms: 2 (1 island platform)
- Tracks: 2
- Connections: Bus routes: 330, 651, 908; 544, 642, 902

Construction
- Structure type: Underground
- Accessible: Yes

History
- Opened: December 31, 2016

Passengers
- 9,500 exits per day as of 6 January 2017

Services
Preceding station	Beijing Subway	Following station
Bei'anhe towards Bei'anhe	Line 16	Daoxianghu Lu towards Wanpingcheng
Location
- Location within Beijing

Wenyang Lu Station (simplified Chinese: 温阳路站; traditional Chinese: 溫陽路站; pinyin: Wēnyáng Lù Zhàn) is a station on the Line 16 of the Beijing Subway. This station opened on 31 December 2016.

== Station layout ==
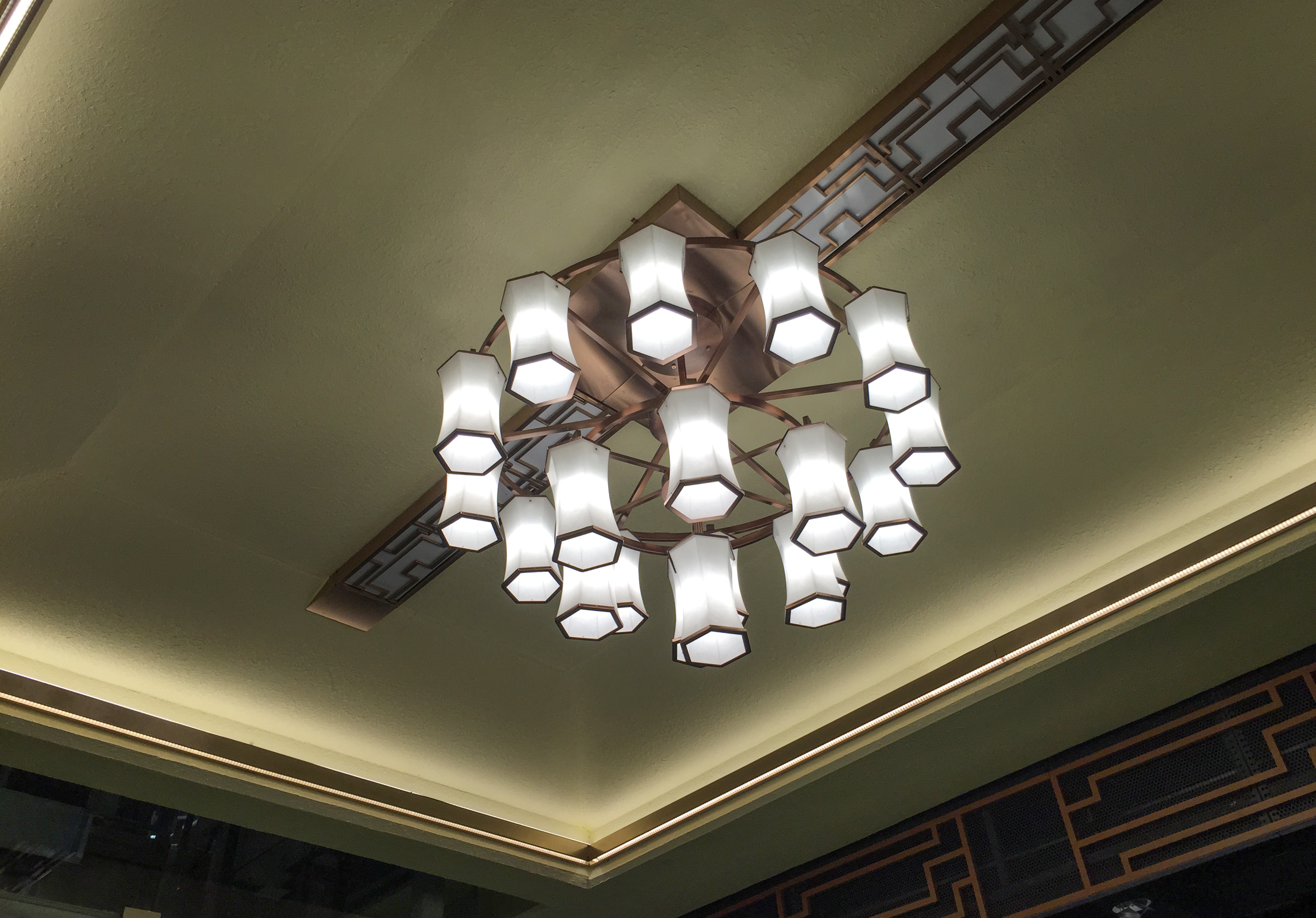
The chandelier in Wenyanglu Station

The station has an underground island platform.

== Exits ==
There are 3 exits, lettered B, C, and D. Exits B and D are accessible.

== Transport connections ==
=== Rail ===
Schedule as of December 2016:

Destination	First Train	Last Train
Line 16
to Bei'anhe	6.27am	11.22pm
to Xiyuan	5.28am	10.33pm
