= Yongfengnan station =

Beijing Subway station

Yongfengnan 永丰南
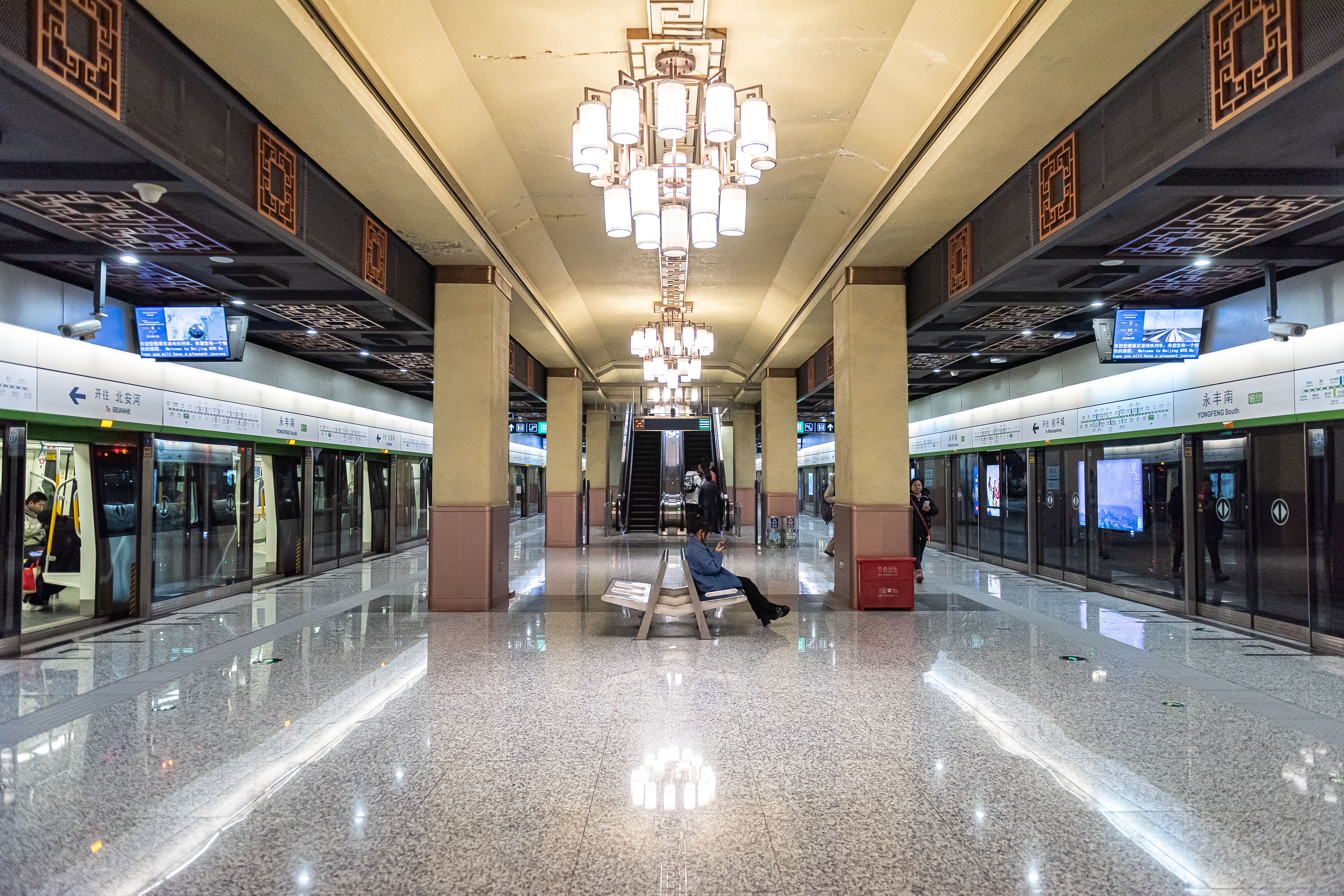
- Platform

General information
- Location: Yongfeng Road (永丰路) and East Fengzhi Road (丰智东路); Haidian District, Beijing; China
- Coordinates: 40°03′56″N 116°14′53″E
- Operator: Beijing MTR Metro Line 16 Corp., Ltd.
- Line: Line 16
- Platforms: 2 (1 island platform)
- Tracks: 2

Construction
- Structure type: Underground
- Accessible: Yes

History
- Opened: December 31, 2016

Services
Preceding station	Beijing Subway	Following station
Yongfeng towards Bei'anhe	Line 16	Xibeiwang towards Wanpingcheng
Location
- Location within Beijing

Yongfengnan station (simplified Chinese: 永丰南站; traditional Chinese: 永豐南站; pinyin: Yǒngfēng Nán Zhàn) is a station on the Line 16 of the Beijing Subway. This station is opened in December 2016.

== Station layout ==
The station has an underground island platform.

== Exits ==
There are 3 exits, lettered B, C, and D. Exits B and D are accessible.

== Transport connections ==
=== Rail ===
Schedule as of December 2016:

Destination	First Train	Last Train
Line 16
to Bei'anhe	6:08 am	11:47 pm
to Wanpingcheng	5:28 am	10:49 pm
