= Yongfeng station (Beijing Subway) =

Beijing Subway station

Yongfeng 永丰
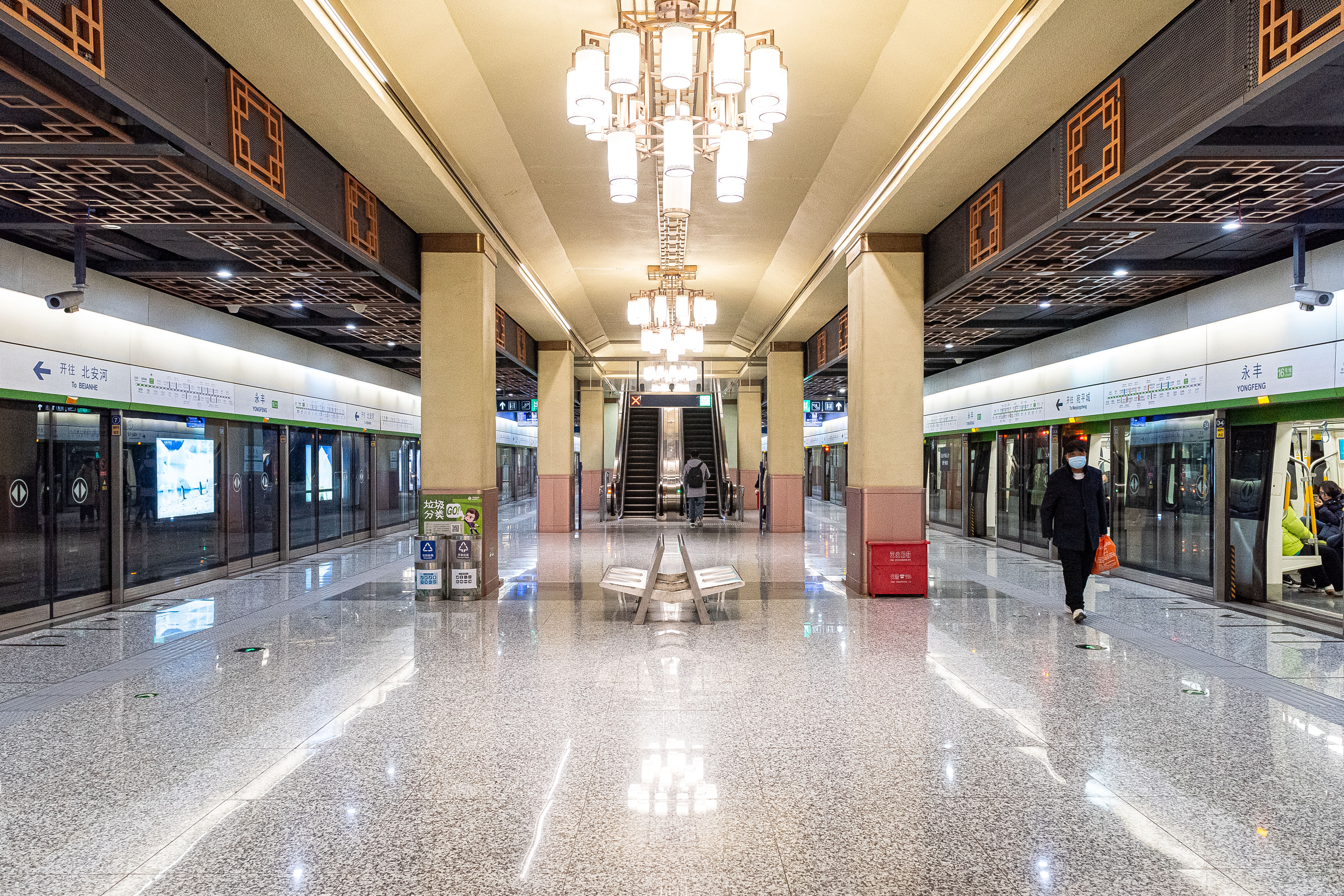
- Platform

General information
- Location: Beiqing Road (北清路) and Yongsheng North Road (永盛北路) / Yongsheng South Road (永盛南路); Haidian District, Beijing; China
- Coordinates: 40°04′19″N 116°14′19″E
- Operator: Beijing MTR Metro Line 16 Corp., Ltd.
- Line: Line 16
- Platforms: 2 (1 island platform)
- Tracks: 2

Construction
- Structure type: Underground
- Accessible: Yes

History
- Opened: December 31, 2016

Services
Preceding station	Beijing Subway	Following station
Tundian towards Bei'anhe	Line 16	Yongfeng Nan(S) towards Wanpingcheng
Location
- Location within Beijing

Yongfeng station (simplified Chinese: 永丰站; traditional Chinese: 永豐站; pinyin: Yǒngfēng Zhàn) is a station on the Line 16 of the Beijing Subway. This station is opened in December 2016.

== Station layout ==
The station has an underground island platform.

== Exits ==
There are 4 exits, lettered A, B, C, and D. Exits A and C are accessible.

== Transport connections ==
=== Rail ===
Schedule as of December 2016:

Destination	First Train	Last Train
Line 16
to Bei'anhe	6.16am	11.11pm
to Xiyuan	5.39am	10.44pm

=== Bus ===
The subway station is located near the Ditieyongfengzhan (地铁永丰站) bus stop, which is served by the 446, 515, 575 and 902 bus lines.
