= Ganjiakou Subdistrict =

Ganjiakou Subdistrict 甘家口街道
- Subdistrict
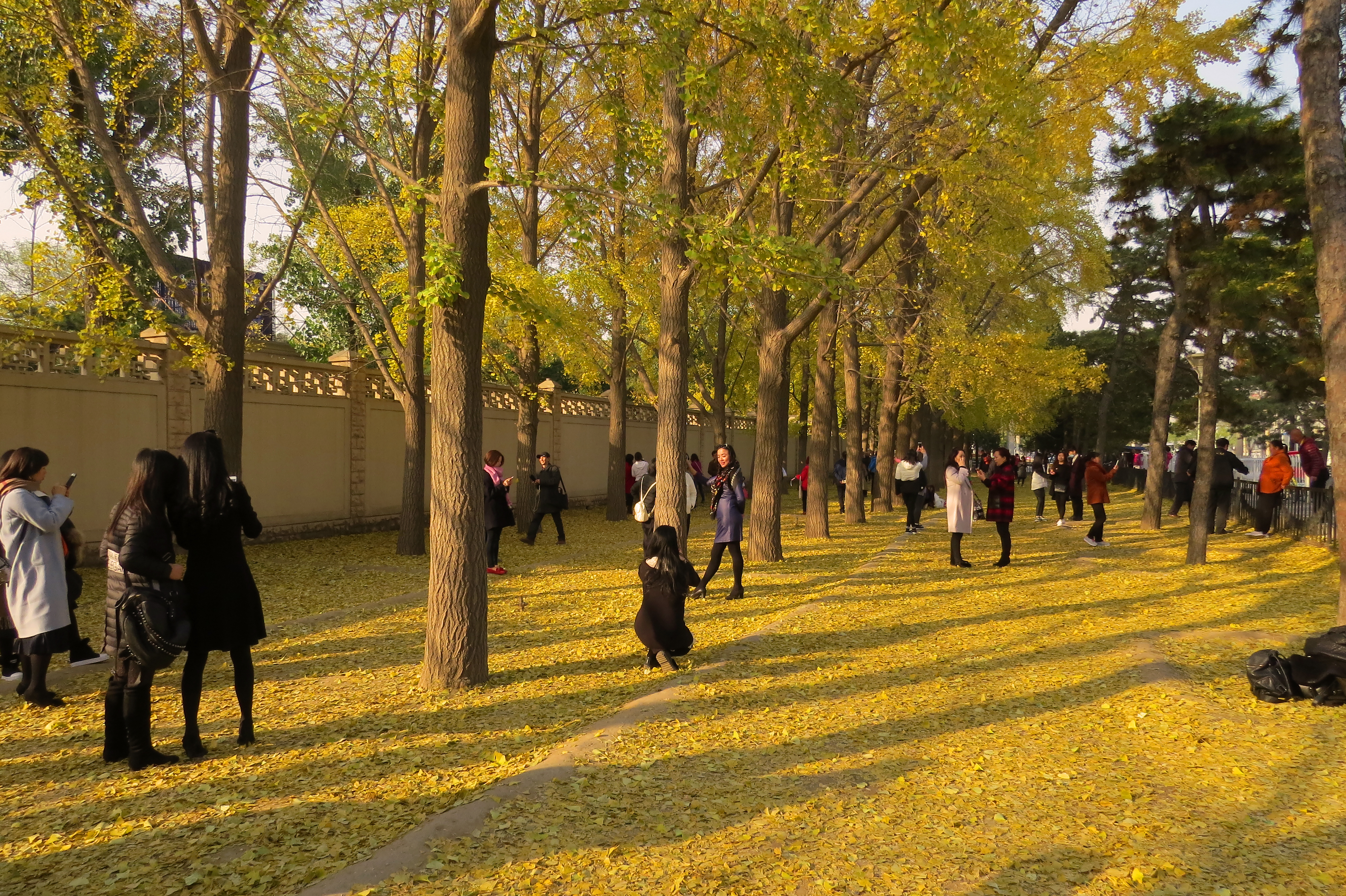
- The avenue of ginkgo outside Diaoyutai State Guesthouse, 2016

- Location within Beijing Location within China
- Coordinates: 39°55′14″N 116°19′16″E
- Country: China
- Municipality: Beijing
- District: Haidian
- Village-level Divisions: 24 communities

Area
  - Total: 6.49 km^{2} (2.51 sq mi)
- Elevation: 56 m (184 ft)

Population (2020)
  - Total: 117,946
  - Density: 18,200/km^{2} (47,100/sq mi)
- Time zone: UTC+8 (China Standard)
- Postal code: 100048
- Area code: 010

Ganjiakou Subdistrict (Chinese: 甘家口街道; pinyin: Gānjiākǒu Jiēdào) is a subdistrict of Haidian District, Beijing, It borders Zizhuyuan and Beixiaguan Subdistricts in the north, Zhanlanlu and Yuetan Subdistrict in the east, Yangfangdian Subdistrict in the south, and Balizhuang Subdistrict in the west. As of 2020, its population was 117,946.

The name Ganjiakou (Chinese: 甘家口; lit. 'Gan Family Intersection') came from a village that used to exist within the region.

== History ==
Timetable of changes in the status of Ganjiakou Subdistrict
Time	Status
1912	Part of the 6th Suburban District
1949	Part of the 16th District
1950	Part of Yuyuantan Township, Haidian District
1958	Part of Yuyuantan People's Commune
1963	Established as Ganjiakou Subdistrict

== Administrative Divisions ==
Ganjiakou Subdistrict was divided into 24 communities as of 2021:

Administrative division code	Subdivision names	Name transliteration
110108004001	阜南	Funan
110108004004	白中	Baizhong
110108004005	白堆子	Baiduizi
110108004006	新街	Xinjie
110108004007	花园村	Huayuankou
110108004010	四道口	Sidaokou
110108004012	水科院	Shuikeyuan
110108004013	机械院	Jixieyuan
110108004014	航天	Hangtian
110108004015	建设部	Jianshebu
110108004016	工商大学	Gongshan Daxue
110108004017	工运	Gongyun
110108004018	空军总医院	Kongjun Zongyiyuan
110108004019	中纺	Zhongfang
110108004022	西钓	Xidiao
110108004025	进口	Jinkou
110108004026	潘庄	Panzhuang
110108004027	甘东	Gandong
110108004028	阜北	Fubei
110108004033	海军总医院	Haijun Zongyiyuan
110108004035	西三环	Xisanhuan
110108004036	公安部一所	Gong'anbu Yisuo
110108004037	西钓嘉园	Xidiao Jiayuan
110108004038	增光	Zengguang

== See also ==
- List of township-level divisions of Beijing
