= Huayuanlu Subdistrict =

Huayuanlu Subdistrict 花园路街道
- Subdistrict
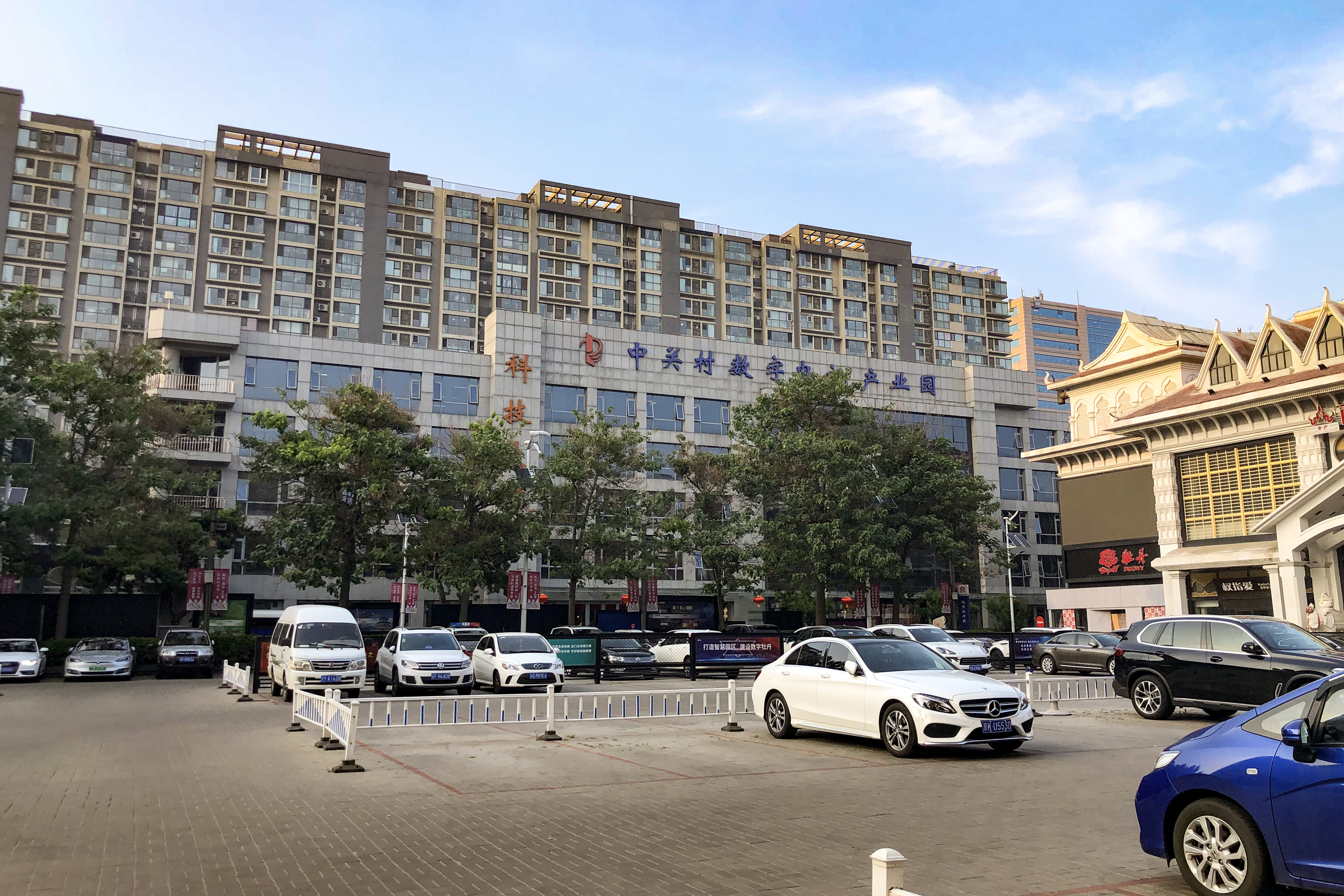
- Zhongguancun Digital Television Industrial Park within the subdistrict, 2021

- Location within Beijing Location within China
- Coordinates: 39°58′35″N 116°21′58″E
- Country: China
- Municipality: Beijing
- District: Haidian
- Village-level Divisions: 27 communities

Area
  - Total: 6.32 km^{2} (2.44 sq mi)
- Elevation: 55 m (180 ft)

Population (2020)
  - Total: 139,362
  - Density: 22,100/km^{2} (57,100/sq mi)
- Time zone: UTC+8 (China Standard)
- Postal code: 100088
- Area code: 010

Huayuanlu Subdistrict (simplified Chinese: 花园路街道; traditional Chinese: 花園路街道; pinyin: Huāyuánlù Jiēdào) is a subdistrict of eastern Haidian District, Beijing. It borders Xueyuanlu Subdistrict to its north, Yayuncun and Anzhen Subdistricts to its east, Desheng and Beitaipingzhuang Subdistricts to its south, and Zhongguancun Subdistrict to its west. As of 2020, it had 139,362 residents under its administration. It was created in March 2000, when parts of Beitaipingzhuang and Xueyuan were separated from their respective subdistricts and merged.

== Administrative Divisions ==
In the year 2021, the subdistrict had 27 communities within its borders:

Administrative division code	Subdivision names	Name transliteration
110108018001	北航	Beihang
110108018002	北医	Beiyi
110108018004	塔院干休所	Tayuan Ganxiusuo
110108018005	邮科	Youke
110108018008	塔院	Tayuan
110108018011	志新村二号院	Zhixincun Erhaoyuan
110108018012	防化	Fanghua
110108018014	北极寺大院	Beijisi Dayuan
110108018015	龙翔路	Longxianglu
110108018016	花园东路	Huayuan Donglu
110108018017	花园北路乙28号院	Huayuan Beilu Yi 28 Haoyuan
110108018018	小关	Xiaoguan
110108018021	北太平庄路	Beitaipingzhuanglu
110108018022	冠城园	Guanchengyuan
110108018024	玉兰园	Yulanyuan
110108018026	月季园第二	Yuejiyuan Di'er
110108018028	北三环中路43号院	Beisanhuan Zhonglu 43 Haoyuan
110108018029	牤牛桥	Mangniuqiao
110108018032	1201	1201
110108018033	北三环中路69号院	Beisanhuan Zhonglu 69 Haoyuan
110108018034	北影	Beiying
110108018035	知春路17号院	Zhichunlu 17 Haoyuan
110108018037	西单商场	Xidan Shangchang
110108018038	金尚嘉园	Jinshang Jiayuan
110108018039	塔院四园	Tayuan Siyuan
110108018040	牡丹园	Mudanyuan
110108018041	中央新影	Zhongyang Xinying

== See also ==
- List of township-level divisions of Beijing
