= Beitaipingzhuang Subdistrict =

Beitaipingzhuang Subdistrict 北太平庄街道
- Subdistrict
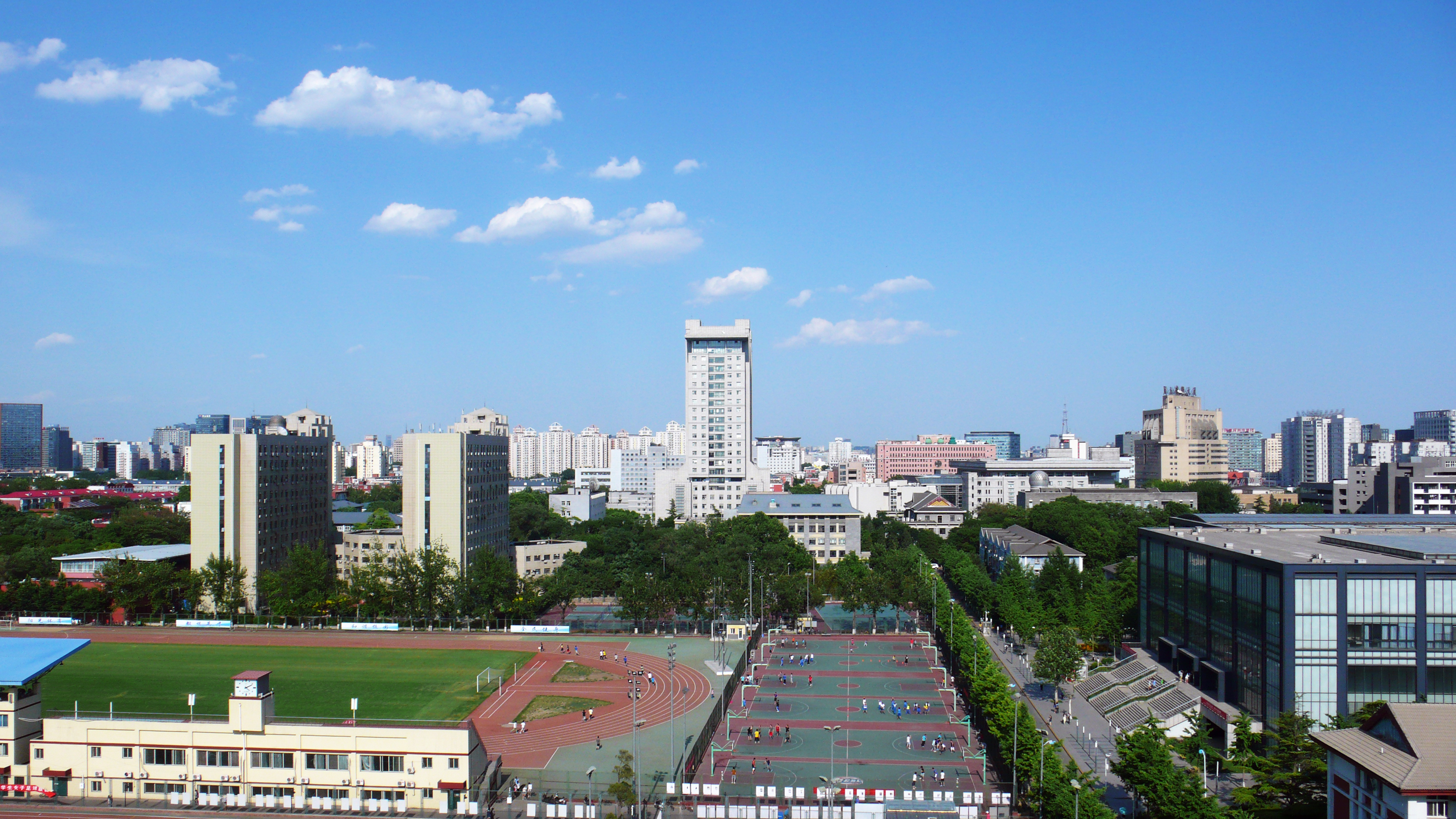
- Main Campus of Beijing Normal University, 2016

- Location within Beijing Location within China
- Coordinates: 39°57′17″N 116°21′08″E
- Country: China
- Municipality: Beijing
- District: Haidian
- Village-level Divisions: 32 communities

Area
  - Total: 5.41 km^{2} (2.09 sq mi)

Population (2020)
  - Total: 163,920
  - Density: 30,300/km^{2} (78,500/sq mi)
- Time zone: UTC+8 (China Standard)
- Postal code: 100082
- Area code: 010

Beitaipingzhuang Subdistrict (Chinese: 北太平庄街道; pinyin: Běitàipíngzhuāng Jiēdào) is a subdistrict located in Haidian District, Beijing, China. It borders Huayuanlu Subdistrict to the northeast, Desheng Subdistrict to the east, Zhanlanlu and Xinjiekou Subdistricts to the south, Zhongguancun and Beixiaguan Subdistricts to the west. According to the results of the 2020 census, the population of Beitaipingzhuang was 163,920.

The name Beitaipingzhuang (Chinese: 北太平庄; pinyin: Běitàipíngzhuāng) refers to its location north of Taipingzhuang, a once-existed village that was founded by refugees fleeing from the Oirats' siege of Beijing in 1449.

== History ==
Timeline of Beitaipingzhuang Subdistrict
Year	Status
1957	Beitaipingzhuang Subdistrict was established
1958	Incorporated into Dongsheng People's Commune
1959	Incorporated into Qinghe People's Commune along with the rest of Dongsheng
1963	Separated from Qinghe and split into 3 subdistricts: Beitaipingzhuang, Beixiaguan and Wudaokou
1968	Changed Beitaipingzhuang Revolutionary Committee
1971	Restored as a subdistrict

== Administrative Divisions ==
As of 2021, Beitaipingzhuang Subdistrict consisted of 32 communities :

Administrative division code	Subdivision names	Name transliteration
110108008001	太平湖	Taipinghu
110108008002	红联村	Hongliancun
110108008003	志强南园	Zhiqiang Nanyuan
110108008006	新外大街23号院	Xinwai Dajie 23 Hao
110108008007	红联东村	Honglian Dongcun
110108008008	文慧园路	Wenhuiyuan Lu
110108008010	志强北园	Zhiqiang Beiyuan
110108008011	学院南路	Xueyuan Nanlu
110108008012	蓟门里	Jimenli
110108008013	罗庄	Luozhuang
110108008014	太月园	Taiyueyuan
110108008015	首都体院	Shoudu Tiyuan
110108008017	索家坟	Suojiafen
110108008018	红联北村	Honglian Beicun
110108008019	今典花园	Jindian Huayuan
110108008022	学院南路32号	Xueyuan Nanlu 32 Hao
110108008024	邮电大学	Youdian Daxue
110108008025	北太平庄	Beitaipingzhuang
110108008026	北三环中路40号	Beisanhuan Zhonglu 40 Hao
110108008030	师范大学	Shifan Daxue
110108008033	冶建院	Yejianyuan
110108008034	明光村	Mingguangcun
110108008036	明光北里	Mingguang Beili
110108008037	时代之光	Shidai Zhiguang
110108008038	政法大院	Zhengfa Dayuan
110108008039	明光村小区	Mingguangcun Xiaoqu
110108008041	文慧园	Wenhuiyuan
110108008042	罗庄东里	Luozhuang Dongli
110108008043	天兆家园	Tianzhao Jiayuan
110108008046	锦秋知春	Jinqiu Zhichun
110108008047	金晖远洋	Jinhui Yuanyang
110108008048	师大北路	Shida Beilu

== See also ==
- List of township-level divisions of Beijing
