= China Machine Press =

Chinese publishing company

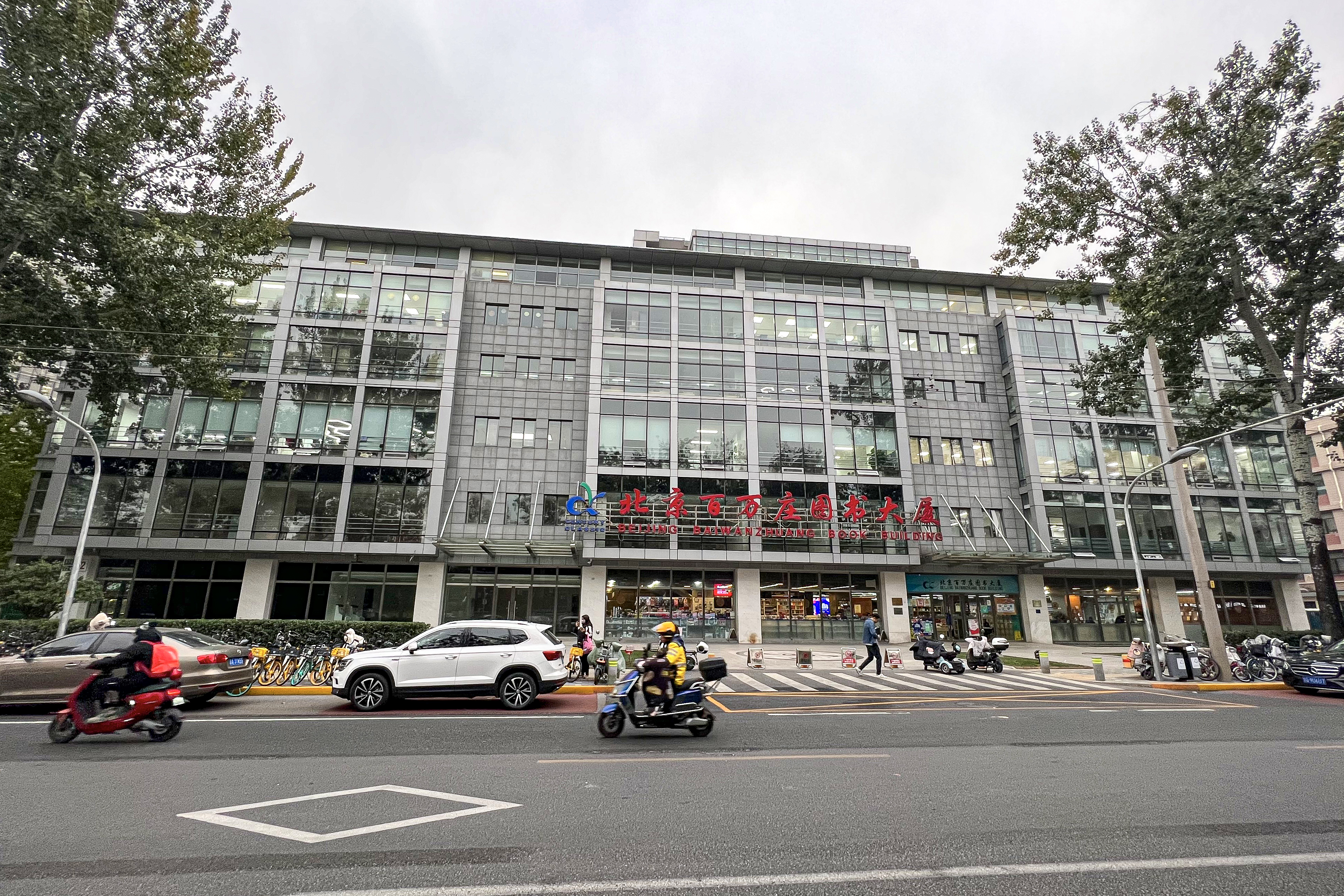
CMP Headquarter Building at Baiwanzhuang, Beijing

China Machine Press (CMP; Chinese: 机械工业出版社) is a major publisher in China, headquartered in Beijing. Founded in 1950, CMP is now a leading science and technology publisher in China, and one of the national top 100 book publishing companies. Its service areas include machinery, electric and electronic industries, producing books, periodicals, data products, audio-visual products, electronic publications, etc.

== History ==
China Machine Press was formerly known as "Science and Technology Press", which was established in 1950.

On December 20, 1952, Science and Technology Press merged with the "Production and Technology" magazine office, and was named "China Machine Press", affiliated to the First Ministry of Machinery Industry of PRC.

In September 1970, the First Ministry of Machinery Industry’s Technical Information Institute and the China Machine Press merged to form the "First Ministry of Machinery Industry’s Scientific and Technical Information Institute", while the publishing business retained the "Machinery Industry Press" brand. And the headquarters moved to No. 1 Baiwanzhuang, South Street, Xicheng District, Beijing.

On May 28, 2009, China Machine Press was rated as a national first-class publishing house by the General Administration of Press and Publication and was awarded the title of "Top 100 Book Publishing Units in China".

In 2013, China Machine Press became the first Chinese publishing house to be a Harvard case study, for its outstanding achievements.

In 2020, CMP was selected into the list of the "National Important Enterprises for Cultural Export".

== Current situation ==
China Machine Press is headquartered in Xicheng District, Beijing, People's Republic of China. As of 2022, it published nearly 2,700 new books and sold more than 36 million books, covering more than ten professional fields such as machinery, electricity and electronics, automobiles, architecture, computers, business management, psychology, life, popular science, art design, and cultural creation.

China Machine Press is now a leading multi-field, multi-discipline and multimedia science and technology publishers in China. It is sponsored by China Machinery Industry Information Research Institute and is currently affiliated to the State-owned Assets Supervision and Administration Commission of the State Council. In fact, China Machinery Industry Information Research Institute and China Machine Press are two brands of the same unit, sharing the same leaders.

China Machine Press owns Beijing Baiwanzhuang Book Building Co., Ltd. and two printing plants, China Machinery Printing Plant and Jingfeng Printing Plant.

== Honors ==
The honors won by CMP include:

- Listed in Harvard University's case library,
- Be the first Chinese company to enter the world's top 500 media,
- A National Excellent Publishing House,
- Among China's 500 Most Valuable Brands,
- In the National Top 100 Publishing Units.
