= Yangfangdian Subdistrict =

Yangfangdian Subdistrict 羊坊店街道
- Subdistrict
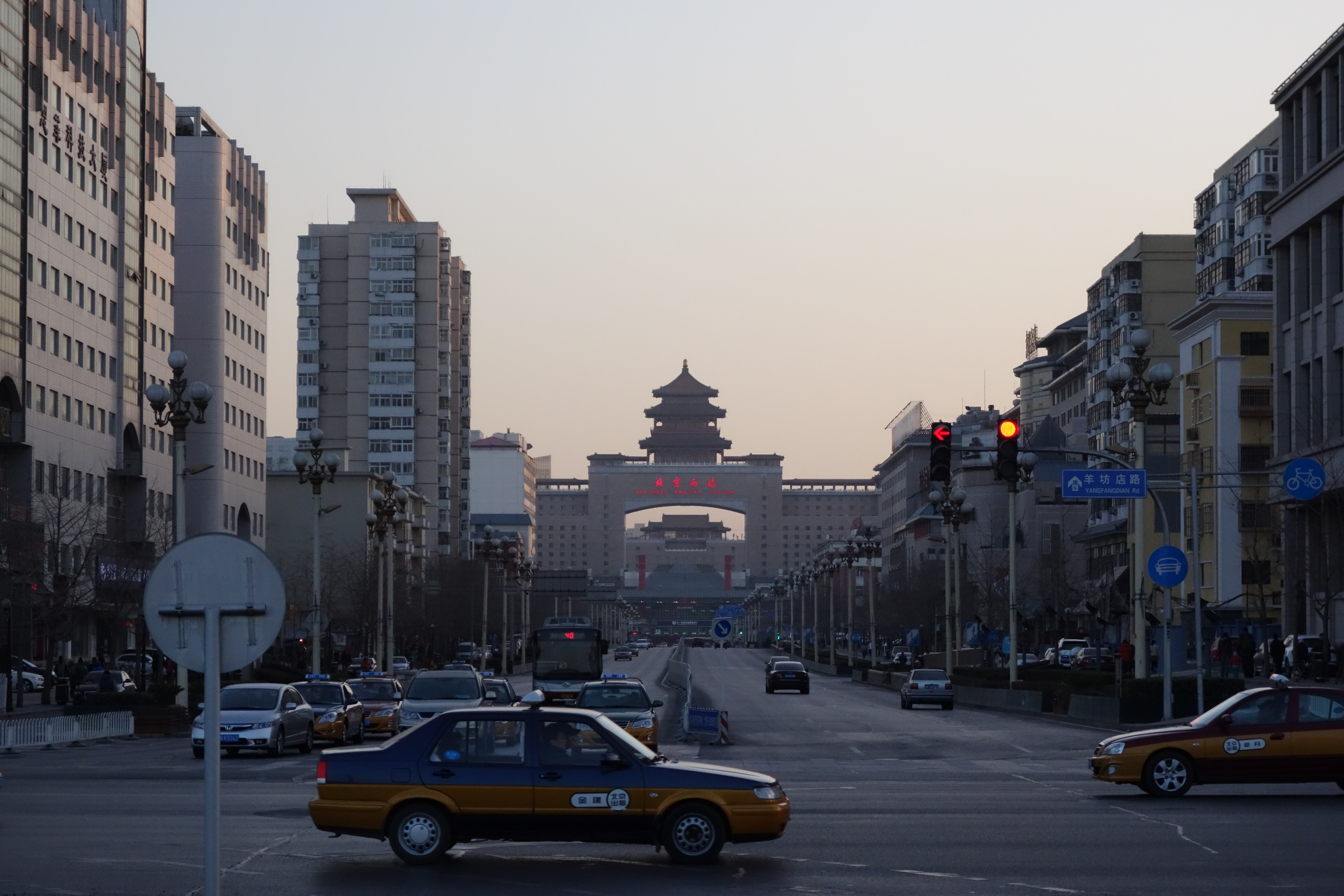
- Beijing West railway station within the subdistrict, 2014

- Location within Beijing Location within China
- Coordinates: 39°54′07″N 116°18′43″E
- Country: China
- Municipality: Beijing
- District: Haidian
- Village-level Divisions: 31 communities

Area
  - Total: 6.53 km^{2} (2.52 sq mi)

Population (2020)
  - Total: 120,302
  - Density: 18,400/km^{2} (47,700/sq mi)
- Time zone: UTC+8 (China Standard)
- Postal code: 100036
- Area code: 010

Yangfangdian Subdistrict (Chinese: 羊坊店街道; pinyin: Yángfāngdiàn Jiēdào) is a subdistrict situated on the southern end of Haidian District, Beijing, China. It borders Ganjiakou and Balizhuang Subdistricts to the north, Yuetan Subdistrict to the east, Guang'anmenwai Subdistrict and Fengtai District to the south, and Wanshou Road Subdistrict to the west. Its population was 120,302 as of the year 2020.

The name Yangfangdian (Chinese: 羊坊店; lit. 'Sheep Store') came from the fact that it was a local hub for trading of livestocks during the Jurchen Jin dynasty.

== History ==
Timeline of Yangfangdian Subdistrict History
Time	Status
Jin dynasty	Part of Zhongdu
Yuan dynasty	Deserted after the construction of Khanbaliq
Ming dynasty	Became Yangwangdian Village
Qing dynasty	Renamed to Yangfangdian
1912	Part of Wanping County
1928	Part of the 4th Suburban District of Beijing
1949	Part of Mashenmiao Village
1954	Created as Yangfangdian Township
1957	Incorporated into Yuyuantan Township
1964	Converted to Yangfangdian Subdistrict
1967	Converted to Yangfangdian Revolutionary Committee
1981	Restored as a subdistrict

== Administrative Divisions ==
Yangfangdian Subdistrict was composed of 31 residential communities as of 2021:

Administrative division code	Subdivision names	Name transliteration
110108003001	海军机关大院	Haijun Jiguan Dayuan
110108003002	会城门	Huichengmen
110108003003	电信局	Dianxinju
110108003004	有色设计院	Youse Shejiyuan
110108003006	新华社皇亭子	Xinhuashe Huangtingzi
110108003007	铁东	Tiedong
110108003008	铁西	Tiexi
110108003010	水科院南院	Shuikeyuan Nanyuan
110108003012	翠微路第二	Cuiweilu Di'er
110108003013	普惠南里	Puhui Nanli
110108003014	永红	Yonghong
110108003015	普惠寺	Puhuisi
110108003017	羊坊店	Yangfangdian
110108003018	吴家场铁路5号院	Wujiachang Tielu 5 Haoyuan
110108003019	中联部	Zhonglianbu
110108003020	乔建	Qiaojian
110108003021	颐源居	Yiyuanju
110108003022	科技部	Kejibu
110108003023	东风	Dongfeng
110108003028	小马厂	Xiaomachang
110108003029	西木楼	Ximulou
110108003031	茂林居	Maolinju
110108003032	三住宅	Sanzhuzhai
110108003033	京西宾馆	Jingxi Binguan
110108003037	军事博物馆	Junshi Bowuguan
110108003038	复兴路23号	Fuxinglu 23 Hao
110108003042	莲花小区	Lianhua Xiaoqu
110108003043	吴家村路十号院	Wujiacunlu Shihaoyuan
110108003044	玉南路9号	Wangnanlu 9 Hao
110108003045	沄沄国际	Yunyun Guoji
110108003046	空军机关大院	Kongjun Jiguan Dayuan

== See also ==
- List of township-level divisions of Beijing
