= Baizhifang Subdistrict =

Baizhifang Subdistrict 白纸坊街道
- Subdistrict
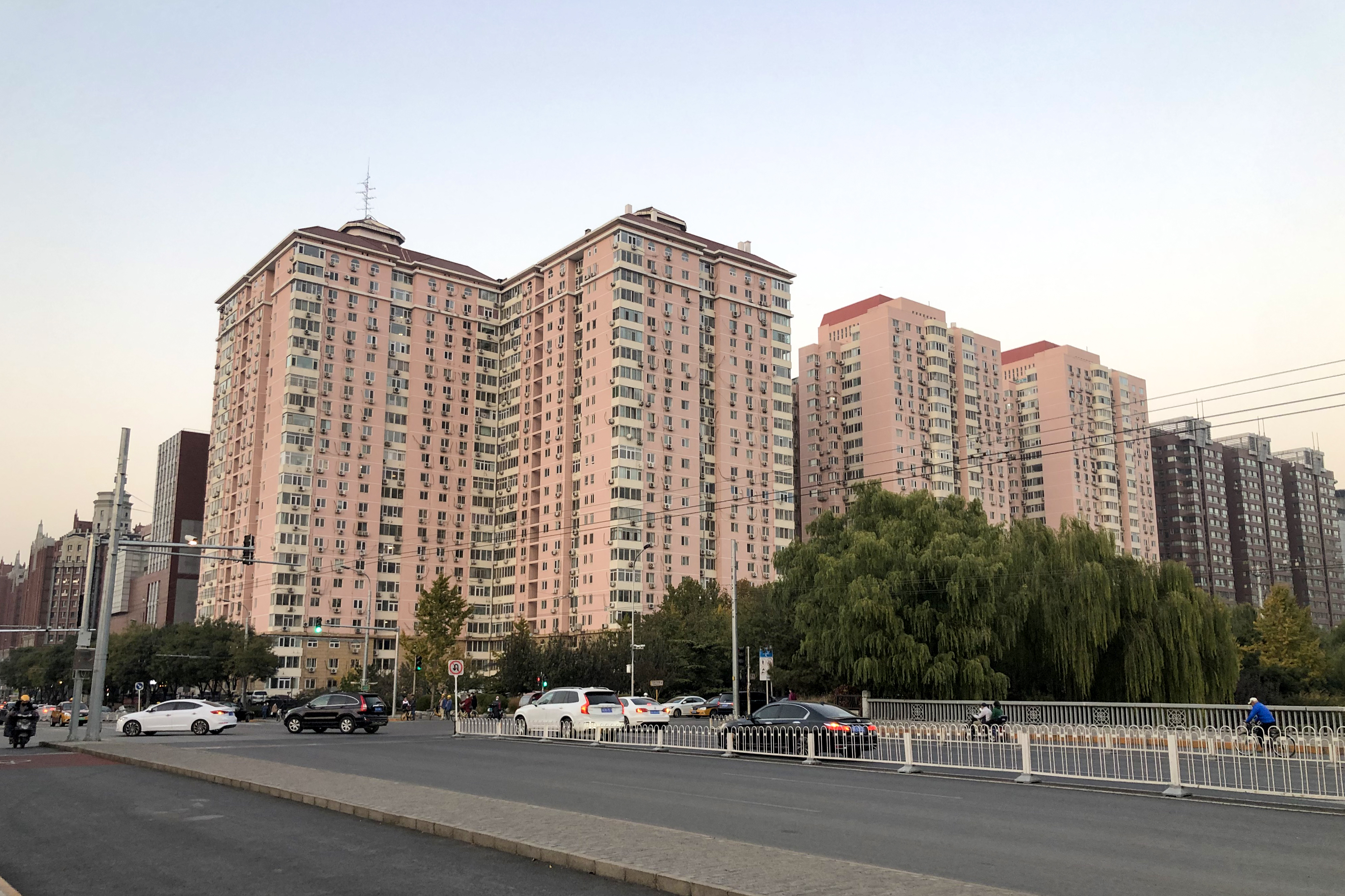
- Wanboyuan Community, Baizhifang Subdistrict, 2020

- Location within Beijing Location within China
- Coordinates: 39°52′52″N 116°21′40″E
- Country: China
- Municipality: Beijing
- District: Xicheng

Area
  - Total: 3.11 km^{2} (1.20 sq mi)

Population (2020)
  - Total: 82,022
  - Density: 26,400/km^{2} (68,300/sq mi)
- Time zone: UTC+8 (China Standard)
- Postal code: 100054
- Area code: 010

Baizhifang Subdistrict (Chinese: 白纸坊街道; pinyin: Báizhǐfāng Jiēdào) is a subdistrict on the southwest part of Xicheng District, Beijing, China. As of 2020, it has a total population of 82,022.

This subdistrict got its name due to its historical status as a paper manufacturing hub. In 1272, the Ministry of Rites set up Baizhifang (Chinese: 白纸坊; lit. 'White Paper Workshop') as a producer of paper for government usage, and the surrounding area got the same name as the institution.

== History ==
Timeline of changes in status of Baizhifang Subdistrict
Time	Status
Liao dynasty	Part of Southwest District of Southern Capital
Jin dynasty	Within the city of Zhongdu
Yuan dynasty	Part of Baizhifang
Ming dynasty	Surrounding areas were incorporated into Baizhifang
Qing dynasty, Reign of Qianlong Emperor	Part of Western City
Qing dynasty, Reign of Guangxu Emperor	Part of Right 4th Outer District
1912	Part of 4th Outer District
1949	Part of 11th District
1950	Part of 8th District
1952	Part of Xuanwu District
1954	Two subdistricts were created: Baizhifang and Guojiajing
1958	Guojiajing, Zixinlu and part of Xinlinqianjie Subdistricts were combined into Baizhifang Subdistricts
1960	Reorganized into a commune
1968	Revolutionary committee of Baizhifang Subdistrict was formed
1978	Reverted to a subdistrict

== Administrative Division ==
As of 2021, there are a total of 19 communities within the subdistrict:

Administrative Division Code	Community Name in English	Community Name in Chinese
110102019002	Shuanghuaili	双槐里
110102019003	Youbei Dajie	右北大街
110102019004	Yingtaoyuan	樱桃园
110102019005	Chongxiaosi	崇效寺
110102019006	Caiyuanjie	菜园街
110102019007	Jiangong Beili	建功北里
110102019008	Jiangong Nanli	建功南里
110102019009	Xin'an Zhongli	新安中里
110102019010	Xin'an Nanli	新安南里
110102019011	Younei Xijie	右内西街
110102019012	Younei Houshen	右内后身
110102019013	Guangyuanli	光源里
110102019014	Banbuqiao	半步桥
110102019015	Zixinlu	自新路
110102019016	Lirenjie	里仁街
110102019017	Wanboyuan	万博苑
110102019018	Qingzhiyuan	清芷园
110102019019	Pingyuanli Beiqu	平原里北区
110102019020	Pingyuanli Nanqu	平原里南区
