= Taikang Life Insurance =

Chinese life insurance company

Taikang Life Insurance Company Limited 泰康人寿保险股份有限公司

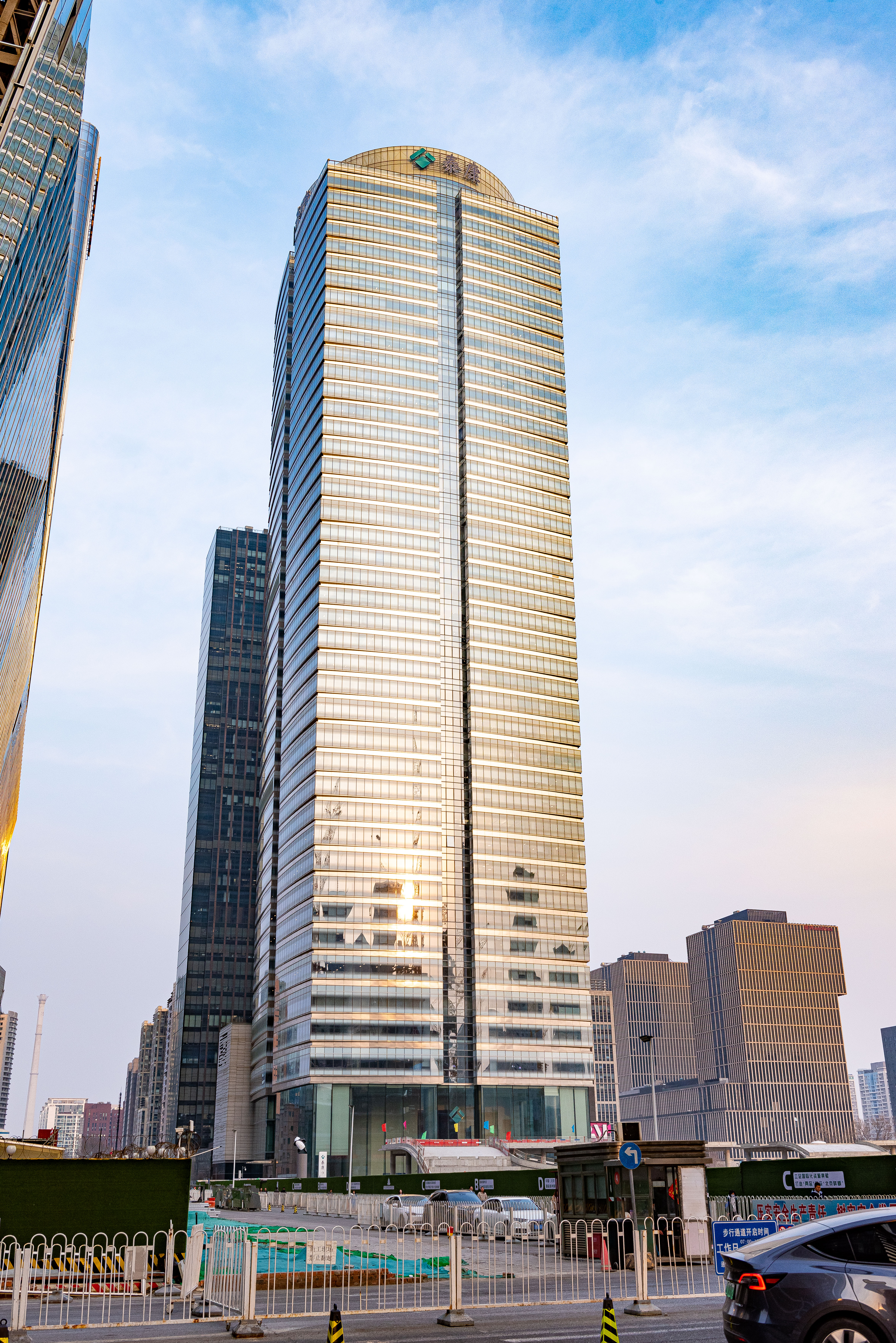
- Headquarters
- Type: Private
- Industry: Financial services, Life insurance
- Founded: 1996
- Founder: Chen Dongsheng
- Headquarters: Beijing, China
- Area served: People's Republic of China
- Key people: Chairman: Mr. Chen Dongsheng Executive VP/CFO: Dr. Jou David
- Products: Life & Health insurance
- Divisions: Taikang Asset Management
- Subsidiaries: Taikang Property Investment Co., Ltd. Taikang Pension Co., Ltd.
- Website: www.taikang.com

Taikang Life Insurance Company Limited is a Beijing-based, China-incorporated life insurance company, the fourth largest life insurer by premium income in China, offers services ranging from life insurance to asset management. It was founded in 1996 by CEO Chen Dongshen, a businessman related to Mao Zedong. The company has branches in Beijing, Shanghai, Hubei, Shandong, Guangdong and in other locations. In 2016, it acquired a 13.5% stake in Sotheby's, becoming the largest shareholder of the New York–based auction company.

Its headquarters is in the Taikang Life Building (泰康人寿大厦) in Xicheng District.

== History ==
Taikang Life Insurance Co. Ltd. was founded on August 22, 1995, after approval from the People's Bank of China, as a national corporation headquartered in Beijing. Under the guidance of chairman and CEO Chen Dongsheng, Taikang Life Insurance has experienced steady growth from its inception.

From 2006 to 2007, Taikang created the two subsidiaries Taikang Asset Management Co. Ltd. and Taikang Pension Co. Ltd., the former being one of the largest investment corporations in Mainland China (winning the "21st century Gold Shell Prize" in investment performance for four consecutive years) and the latter being one of the first corporations to obtain government approval for the development of a retirement community. Taikang Property Investment Co. Ltd., which focuses on higher risk, opportunistic investments especially in conjunction with real estate and retirement community projects, was created in March 2010. Taikang Life's premium revenue in 2010 totaled 86.8 billion yuan, representing a year-on-year increase of 29%, and after-tax profits totaled 2.1 billion yuan.

In 2011, Goldman Sachs acquired a 12.02% stake (102.48 million shares) in Taikang Life Insurance from AXA Life Ltd. Taikang Life is preparing for an initial public offering on both the Shanghai and Hong Kong stock exchanges.

== Operations ==
Taikang Life had end-of-year total assets totaling 500 billion yuan and net company assets totaling 12.5 billion yuan in 2011. Taikang has 35 branches throughout China.
