= Financial Street Subdistrict, Beijing =

Financial Street Subdistrict 金融街街道
- Subdistrict
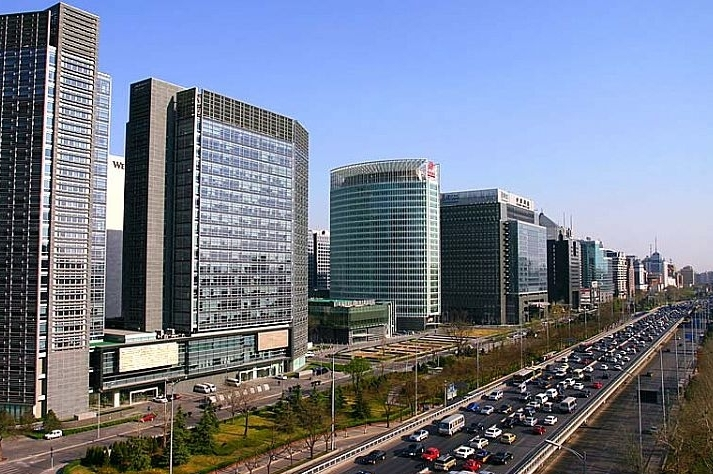
- Beijing Financial Street, 2007

- Location within Beijing Location within China
- Coordinates: 39°54′36″N 116°21′26″E
- Country: China
- Municipality: Beijing
- District: Xicheng

Area
  - Total: 3.78 km^{2} (1.46 sq mi)

Population (2020)
  - Total: 54,849
  - Density: 14,500/km^{2} (37,600/sq mi)
- Time zone: UTC+8 (China Standard)
- Postal code: 100032
- Area code: 010

Financial Street Subdistrict (Chinese: 金融街街道; pinyin: Jīnróngjiē Jiēdào) is a subdistrict on the center of Xicheng District, Beijing, China. As of 2020, its total population is 54,849.

== History ==
Timeline of changes in the status of FSS
Time	Status
Yuan dynasty	Part of Fucai and Xianyi Wards
Ming dynasty	Part of Fucai, Xianyi and Jincheng Wards
Qing dynasty	Part of Xianghong and Xianglan Banners
1912	Part of 2nd and 4th Inner Districts
1949	Part of 2nd and 4th Districts
1952	Transferred under Xidan District
1958	Transferred under Xicheng District
2004	Erlonglu and Fengsheng Subdistricts were merged to form Financial Street Subdistrict

== Administrative Division ==
As of 2021, there are 20 communities within the subdistrict:

Administrative Division Code	Community Name (English)	Community Name (Chinese)
110102011001	Jingjidao	京畿道
110102011003	Xitaipingjie	西太平街
110102011004	Erlonglu	二龙路
110102011005	Dongtaipingjie	东太平街
110102011007	Wenjiajie	温家街
110102011008	Shoushuihe	受水河
110102011009	Wenchang	文昌
110102011010	Shoupa	手帕
110102011011	Xinwenhuajie	新文化街
110102011012	Xinhuashe	新华社
110102011013	Zhongyang Yinyue Xueyuan	中央音乐学院
110102011014	Jiaoyubu	教育部
110102011015	Minkang	民康
110102011018	Fenghuiyuan	丰汇园
110102011019	Honghuiyuan	宏汇园
110102011020	Fengrongyuan	丰融园
110102011021	Fengsheng	丰盛
110102011022	Dayuan	大院
110102011023	Zhuanta	砖塔
110102011024	Huajia	华嘉

== Landmarks ==
- National Assembly Building
- Prince Chun Mansion
