= Chunshu Subdistrict =

Chunshu Subdistrict 椿树街道
- Subdistrict
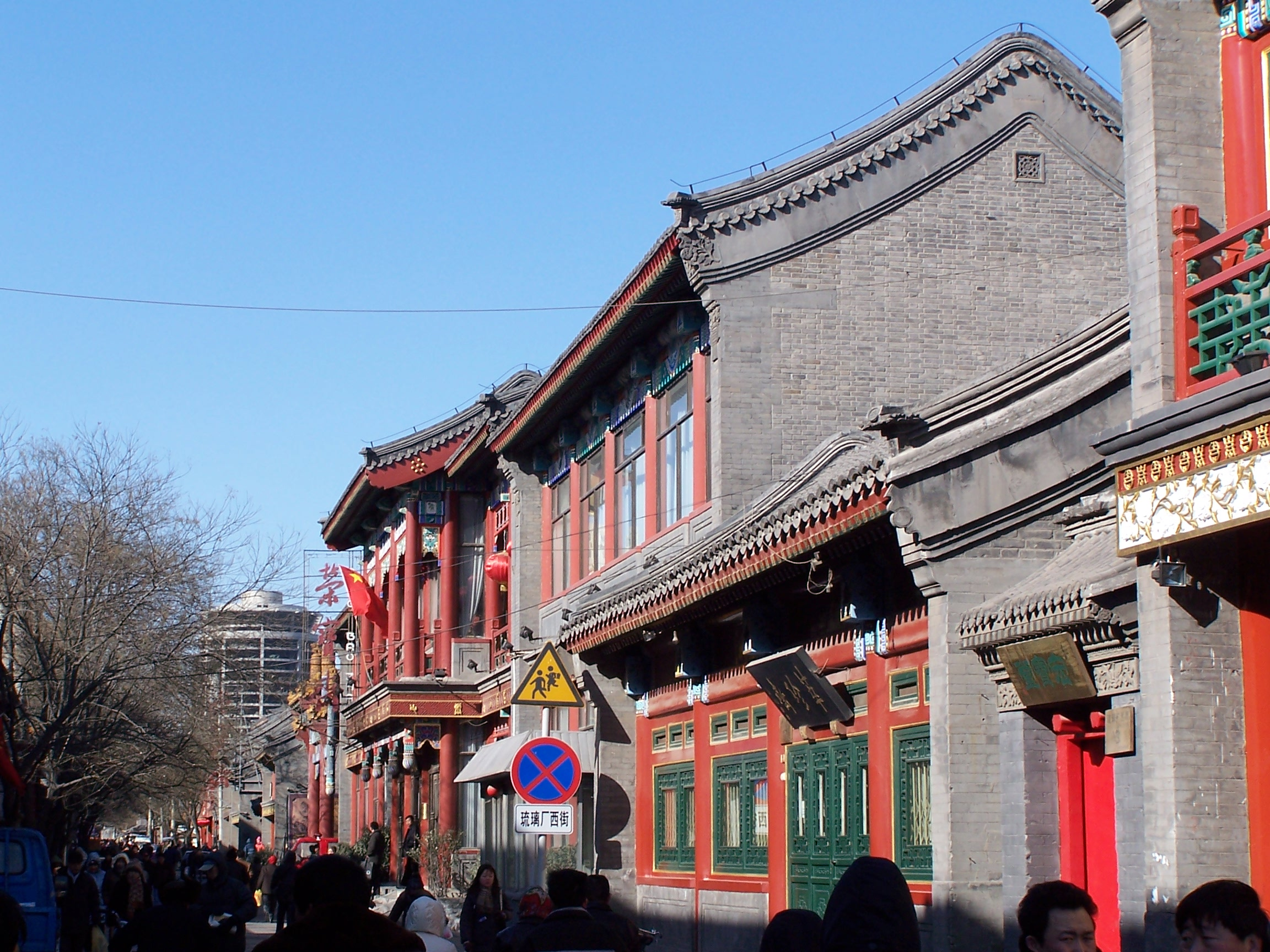
- Liulichang Street, the western end of which is in Chunshu Subdistrict, 2005

- Location within Beijing Location within China
- Coordinates: 39°53′47″N 116°22′47″E
- Country: China
- Municipality: Beijing
- District: Xicheng

Area
  - Total: 1.08 km^{2} (0.42 sq mi)

Population (2020)
  - Total: 27,417
  - Density: 25,400/km^{2} (65,700/sq mi)
- Time zone: UTC+8 (China Standard)
- Postal code: 100052
- Area code: 010

Chunshu Subdistrict (Chinese: 椿树街道; pinyin: Chūnshù Jiēdào) is a subdistrict on the southeastern portion of Xicheng District, Beijing, China. As of 2020, its total population is 27,417.

The subdistrict got its current name due to its abundance of Chinese mahogany (Chinese: 椿树; pinyin: Chūnshù) in the area, which were already present during the Ming dynasty.

== History ==
Timeline of changes in the status of Chunshu Subdistrict
Time	Status
Jin dynasty	Part of Jiahui Ward
Ming dynasty	Part of Xuanbei Ward
Qing dynasty, Reign of Qianlong Emperor	Part of Outer Urban District, Northern City
Qing dynasty, Reign of Xuantong Emperor	Part of Right 1st and 2nd Outer Districts
1912	Part of 2nd Outer District
1949	Part of 9th District
1950	Part of 6th District
1952	Part of Qianmen District
1954	Three subdistricts were created: Xiangluying, Chunshuxia Toutiao and Maxian
1958	Three were combined to form Chunshu Subdistrict, and transferred under Xuanwu District. Made into a people's commune on Sep.
1962	Restored as a subdistrict
2010	Transferred under Xicheng District

== Administrative Division ==
As of 2021, there are 7 communities under the Chunshu Subdistrict:

Administrative Division Code	Community Name in English	Community Name in Simplified Chinese
110102015001	Xuanwumenwai Dongdajie	宣武门外东大街
110102015002	Liulichang Xijie	琉璃厂西街
110102015003	Chunshuyuan	椿树园
110102015004	Sichuanying	四川营
110102015006	Liangjiayuan	梁家园
110102015007	Xiangluying	香炉营
110102015008	Yongguang	永光
