= Tianqiao Subdistrict, Beijing =

Tianqiao Subdistrict 天桥街道
- Subdistrict
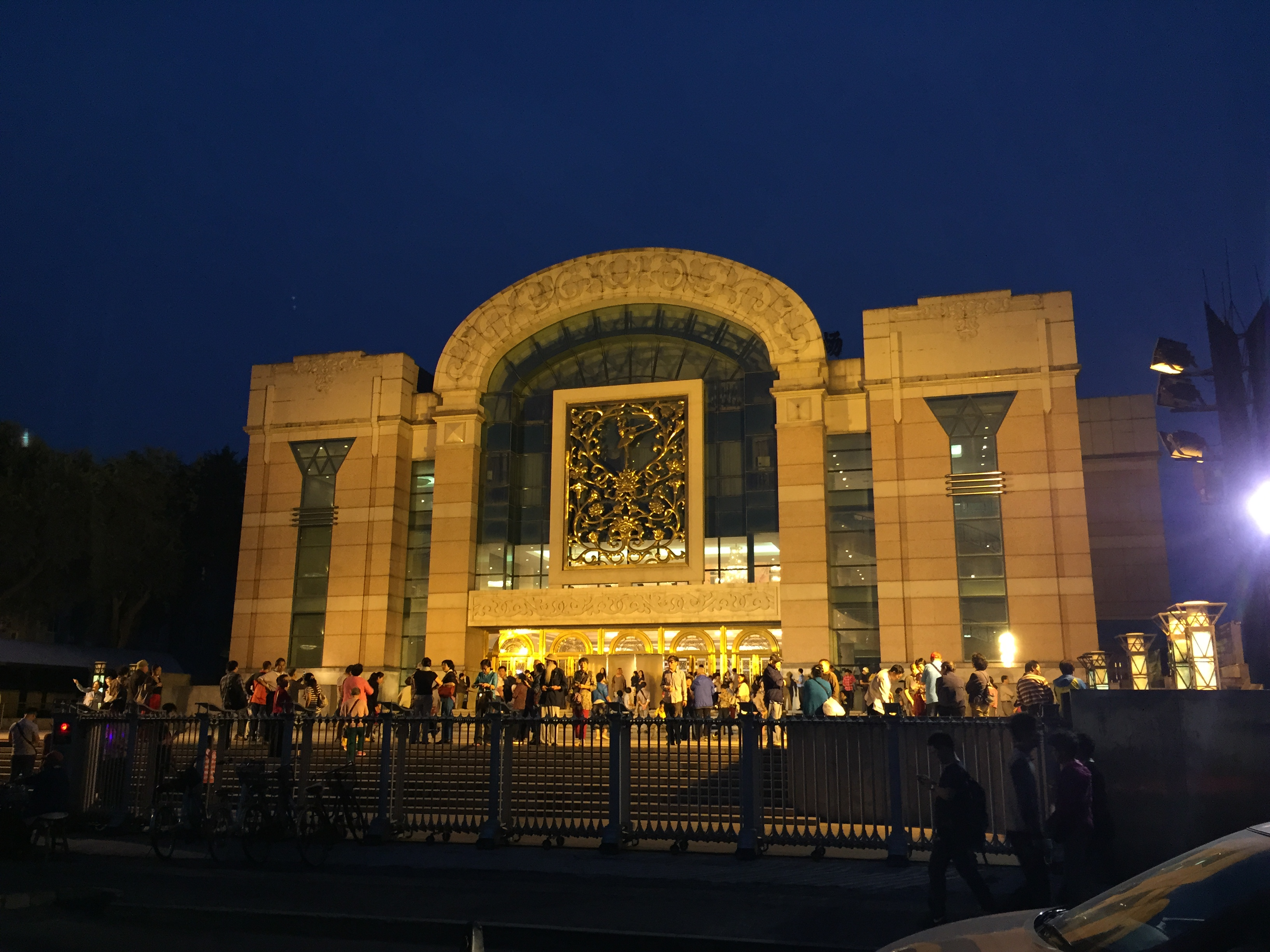
- Tianqiao Theater within the Subdistrict

- Location within Beijing Location within China
- Coordinates: 39°53′1″N 116°23′45″E
- Country: China
- Municipality: Beijing
- District: Xicheng

Area
  - Total: 2.07 km^{2} (0.80 sq mi)

Population (2020)
  - Total: 34,427
  - Density: 16,600/km^{2} (43,100/sq mi)
- Time zone: UTC+8 (China Standard)
- Postal code: 100050
- Area code: 010

Tianqiao Subdistrict (Chinese: 天桥街道; pinyin: Tiānqiáo Jiēdào) is a subdistrict on the southeastern portion of Xicheng District, Beijing, China. As of 2020, it has a total population of 34,427.

== History ==
Timeline of changes in the status of Tianqiao Subdistrict
Time	Status
Yuan dynasty	Part of Southern Suburb, Dadu
Ming dynasty	Part of South Suburban District
Qing dynasty	Part of Right 5th Outer District
1912	Part of 5th Outer District
1949	Part of 12th District
1950	Part of 9th District
1951	Part of Xuanwu District
1954	4 subdistricts were established: Yao'er Hutong, Fuchangjie Santiao, Hufanglu and Tianqiao
1957	Fuchangjie Santiao Subdistrict was disbanded
1958	Yao'er Hutong and eastern half of Hufanglu Subdistricts were incorporated into Tianqiao Subdistrict
1960	Transformed to People's Commune of Tianqiao
1978	Reverted to a subdistrict
2010	Transferred under Xicheng District

== Administrative Division ==
As of 2021, there are a total of 9 communities within the subdistrict. They are listed as follows:

Administrative Division Code	Community Name in English	Community Name in Chinese
110102014001	Liuxuelu	留学路
110102014002	Xiangchanglu	香厂路
110102014003	Tianqiao Xiaoqu	天桥小区
110102014004	Luchangjie	禄长街
110102014005	Xiangnongtan	先农坛
110102014006	Yong'anlu	永安路
110102014007	Hufanglu	虎坊路
110102014008	Taipingjie	太平街
110102014009	Fuchangjie	福长街

== Landmark ==
- Temple of Agriculture
