= Xichang'anjie Subdistrict =

Xichang'anjie Subdistrict 西长安街街道
- Subdistrict
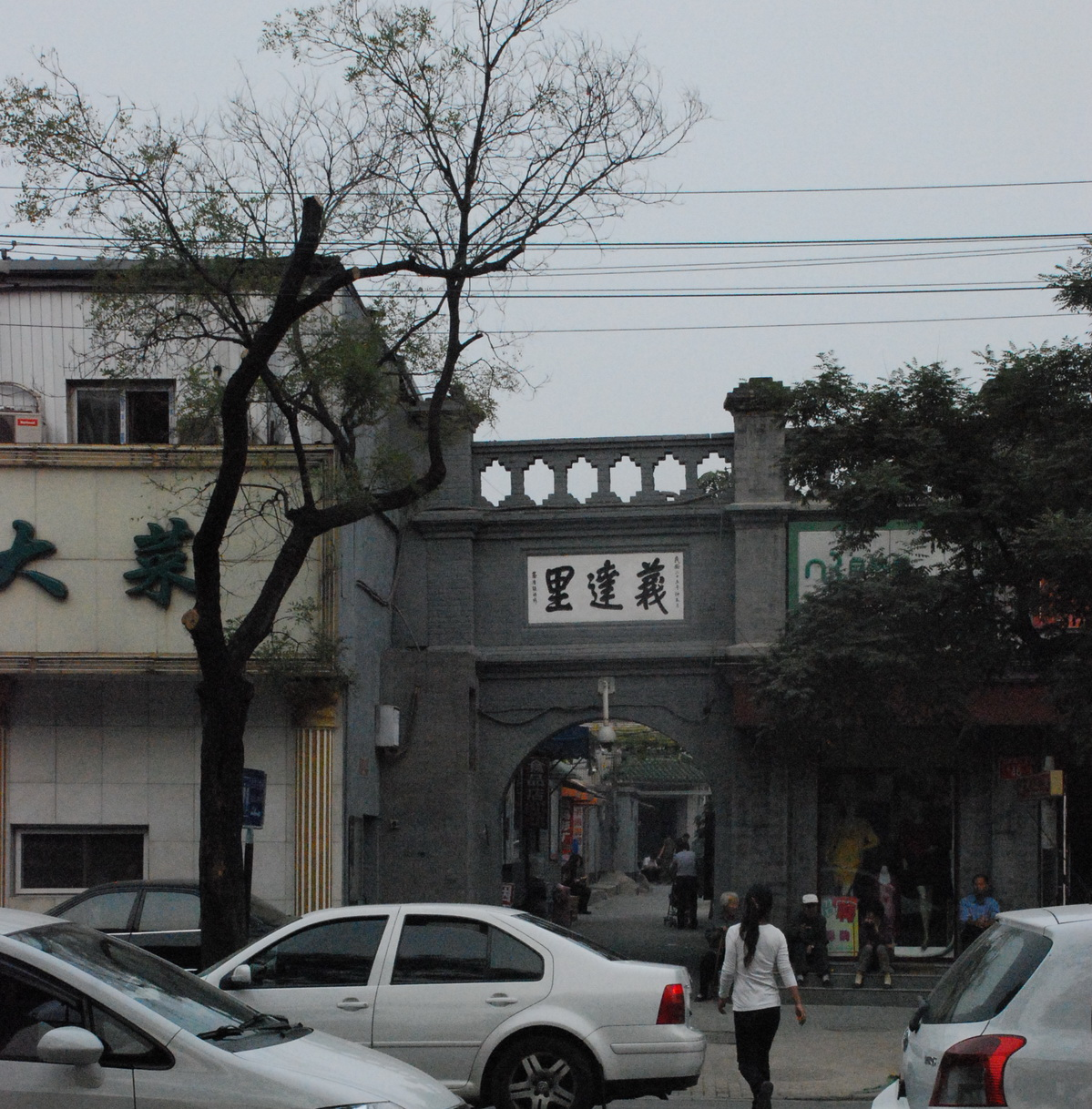
- Yidali, part of the West Chang'an Subdistrict, 2011

- Location within Beijing Location within China
- Coordinates: 39°54′42″N 116°22′29″E
- Country: China
- Municipality: Beijing
- District: Xicheng

Area
  - Total: 4.24 km^{2} (1.64 sq mi)
- Elevation: 53 m (174 ft)

Population (2020)
  - Total: 36,645
  - Density: 8,640/km^{2} (22,400/sq mi)
- Time zone: UTC+8 (China Standard)
- Postal code: 100032
- Area code: 010

Xichang'anjie Subdistrict (simplified Chinese: 西长安街街道; traditional Chinese: 西長安街街道; pinyin: Xī Cháng'ān Jiē Jiēdào) is a subdistrict on the eastern part of Xicheng District, Beijing.

The subdistrict got its name from the Chang'an Avenue (Chinese: 长安街; lit. 'Eternal Peace Avenue'). As of 2020, it had 11 residential communities (社区) under its administration, containing a total population of 36,645

== History ==
Timeline of changes in the status of Xihang'anjie Subdistrict
Time	Status
Qing dynasty	Part of Xianghong and Xianglan banners
1912	Part of 2nd, 4th, 6th and 7th Inner Districts
1949	Part of 2nd and 5th Districts
1952	Transferred under Xidan District
1954	The following subdistricts were created: Dongwenchangge; Dasiyanjing; Xi'anfu Hutong; Weiying Hutong; Heng'ertiao; Xidan Beidajie; Nanchangjie; Xixinsi
1958	All merged into Xichang'anjie Subdistrict and transferred under Xicheng District
1960	Transformed to a commune
1961	Reinstated as a subdistrict

== Administrative Division ==
As of 2021, there are 11 communities under the subdistrict:

Administrative Division Code	Community Name in English	Community Name in Simplified Chinese
110102001004	Fuyoujienan	府右街南
110102001007	Xijiaominxiang	西交民巷
110102001011	Beixinhuajie	北新华街
110102001012	Liubukou	六部口
110102001013	Hepingmen	和平门
110102001018	Zhongsheng	钟声
110102001019	Taipusi	太仆寺
110102001023	Xihuangchenggennan	西黄城根南
110102001026	Yidali	义达里
110102001027	Xidanbei	西单北
110102001028	Weiying	未英

== Landmarks ==
- Xidan
- Zhongnanhai
- Great Hall of the People
- National Centre for the Performing Arts
- Cathedral of the Immaculate Conception

== See also ==
- List of township-level divisions of Beijing
