= Guang'anmennei Subdistrict =

Guang'anmennei Subdistrict 广安门内街道
- Subdistrict
- Baoguo Temple within the subdistrict, 2016

- Location within Beijing Location within China
- Coordinates: 39°53′46″N 116°21′55″E
- Country: China
- Municipality: Beijing
- District: Xicheng

Area
  - Total: 2.43 km^{2} (0.94 sq mi)

Population (2020)
  - Total: 60,318
  - Density: 24,800/km^{2} (64,300/sq mi)
- Time zone: UTC+8 (China Standard)
- Postal code: 100053
- Area code: 010

Guang'anmennei Subdistrict (Chinese: 广安门内街道; pinyin: Guǎng'ānménnèi Jiēdào) is a subdistrict within the southern half of Xicheng District, Beijing, China. As of 2020, it has a total population of 60,318.

The subdistrict got its name because it is located within Guang'anmen (Chinese: 广安门; lit. 'Gate of Expansive Peace') and the former Beijing city wall.

== History ==
Timeline of changes in the status of Guang'anmennei Subdistrict
Time	Status
938	Part of Tangyin, Shihe and Xianlu Wards
Jin dynasty	Part of Tangyin, Shihe, Xianlu, Huixian, Kaiyuan and Jintai Wards
Ming dynasty	Part of South Urban Region
Qing dynasty	Part of Right 3rd Outer District
1928	Part of 4th Outer District
1949	Part of 11th District
1950	Part of 8th District
1952	Part of Xuanwu District
1954	Four subdistricts were created: Xiaochang Santiao, Guanghuisi, Xiaxiejie and Yingfang
1958	Merged into Guangnei Subdistrict
1960	Changed to a commune
1978	Reinstated as Guang'anmennei Subdistrict

== Administrative Division ==
As of 2021, there are 18 communities within the subdistrict:

Administrative Division Code	Community Name (English)	Community Name (Chinese)
110102017001	Xibianmen Xili	西便门西里
110102017002	Xibianmen Dongli	西便门东里
110102017003	Huaiboshujie Beili	槐柏树街北里
110102017004	Changchunjiexi	长椿街西
110102017005	Huaiboshujie Nanli	槐柏树街南里
110102017006	Hetaoyuan	核桃园
110102017007	Baoguosi	报国寺
110102017008	Shangxiejie	上斜街
110102017009	Xuanwumen	宣武门西大街
110102017010	Sanmiaojie	三庙街
110102017011	Kangleli	康乐里
110102017012	Guang'an Dongli	广安东里
110102017013	Dajiedong	大街东
110102017014	Laoqianggen	老墙根
110102017015	Changchunjie	长椿街
110102017016	Xibianmennei	西便门内
110102017017	Changchunli	长椿里
110102017018	Xiaochang	校场

== Landmark ==
- Changchun Temple
