= Zhongguancun Subdistrict =

Zhongguancun Subdistrict 中关村街道
- Subdistrict
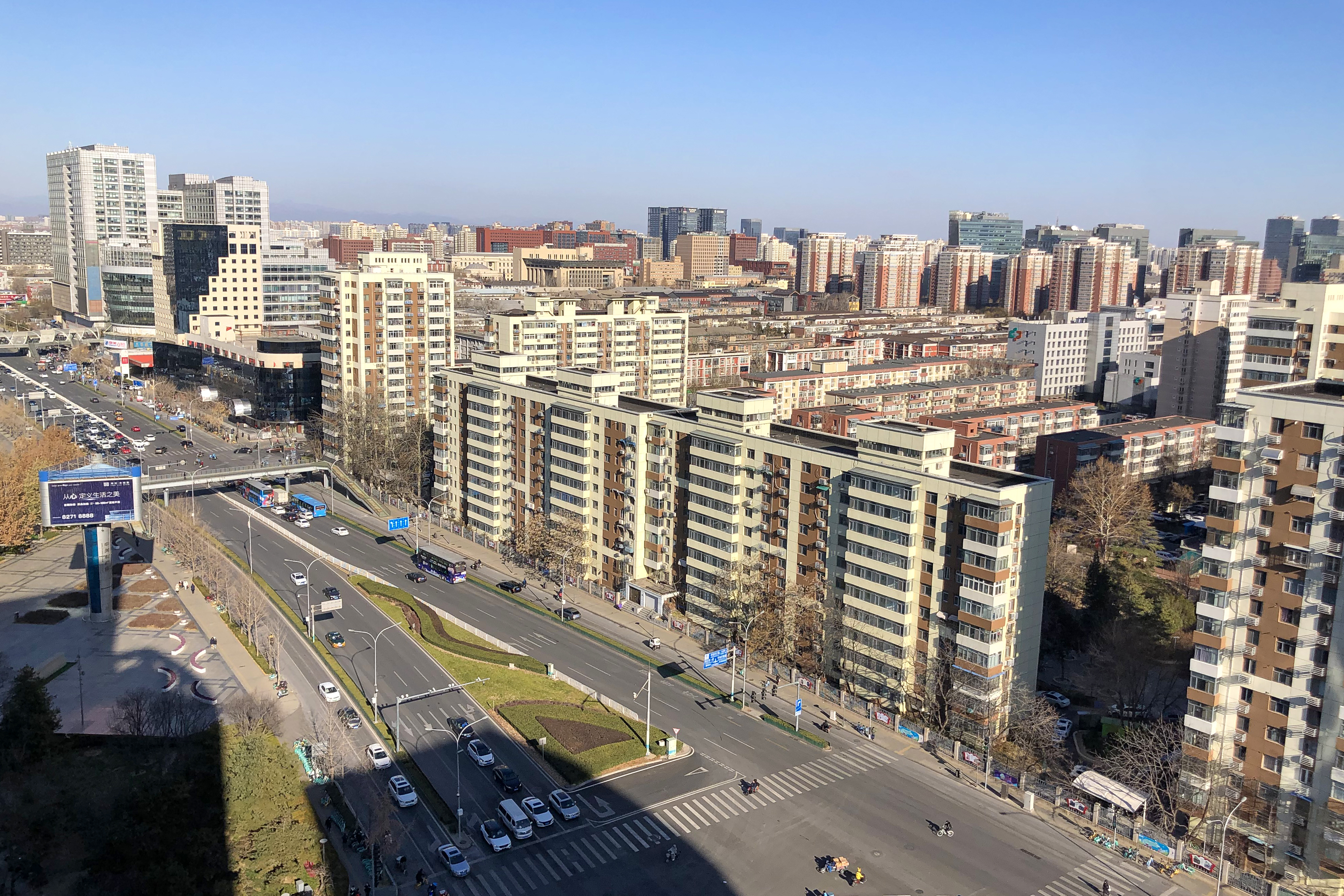
- Huangzhuang Microdistrict within Zhongguancun, 2020

- Location within Beijing Location within China
- Coordinates: 39°58′41″N 116°18′40″E
- Country: China
- Municipality: Beijing
- District: Haidian
- Village-level Divisions: 30 communities

Area
  - Total: 5.28 km^{2} (2.04 sq mi)

Population (2020)
  - Total: 130,672
  - Density: 24,700/km^{2} (64,100/sq mi)
- Time zone: UTC+8 (China Standard)
- Postal code: 100080
- Area code: 010

Zhongguancun Subdistrict (Chinese: 中关村街道; pinyin: Zhōngguāncūn Jiēdào) is a subdistrict on the southeast of Haidian District, Beijing, China. It shares border with Qinghuayuan Subdistrict and Dongsheng Town in the north, Xueyuan Road, Huayuan Road and Beitaipingzhuang Subdistricts in the east, Beixiaguan Subdistrict in the south, Haidian and Yanyuan Subdistricts in the west. It had 130,672 inhabitants in 2020.

During the Ming dynasty, this area was used as a burial ground for eunuchs, thus was given the name Zhongguanfen (Chinese: 中官坟; lit. 'Eunuch Tomb'). Later settlements in this region also use the name Zhongguan, which was changed to Zhongguancun (Chinese: 中关村) in 1949.

== History ==
Timeline of Zhongguancun Subdistrict
Year	Status
1949	Part of the 18th District of Beijing
1950	Part of Baofusi Township
1956	Part of Dazhongsi Township
1959	Part of Dazhongsi Production Team
1961	Zhongguancun Subdistrict was founded
2005	Incorporated Shuangyushu Subdistrict and Dongshengyuan Area of Xueyuan Road Subdistrict

== Administrative Divisions ==
As of 2020, Zhongguancun Subdistrict had direct jurisdiction over 30 communities:

Administrative division code	Subdivision names	Name transliteration
110108011001	科源	Keyuan
110108011002	科春	Kechun
110108011003	黄庄	Huangzhuang
110108011004	科育	Keyu
110108011005	科馨	Kexin
110108011006	科煦	Kexu
110108011007	科汇	Kehui
110108011008	软件	Ruanjian
110108011009	空间	Kongjian
110108011010	航天	Hangtian
110108011011	东南	Dongnan
110108011012	科星	Kexing
110108011013	新科祥园	Xinke Xiangyuan
110108011014	西里	Xili
110108011015	东里南	Donglin Nan
110108011016	东里北	Donglin Bei
110108011017	北里	Beli
110108011018	知春里西	Zhichunli Xi
110108011019	知春里	Zhichunli
110108011020	知春东里	Zhichun Dongli
110108011023	白塔庵	Baita'an
110108011024	红民村	Hongmincun
110108011026	青云北	Qingyun Bei
110108011027	太阳园	Taiyangyuan
110108011031	航勘	Hangkan
110108011032	华清园	Huaqingyuan
110108011033	豪景佳苑	Haojing Jiayuan
110108011034	希格玛	Xigema
110108011035	航天五院	Hangtian Wuyuan
110108011036	熙典华庭	Xidian Huating

== See also ==
- List of township-level divisions of Beijing
- Zhongguancun
