= Guang'anmenwai Subdistrict =

Guang'anmenwai Subdistrict 广安门外街道
- Subdistrict
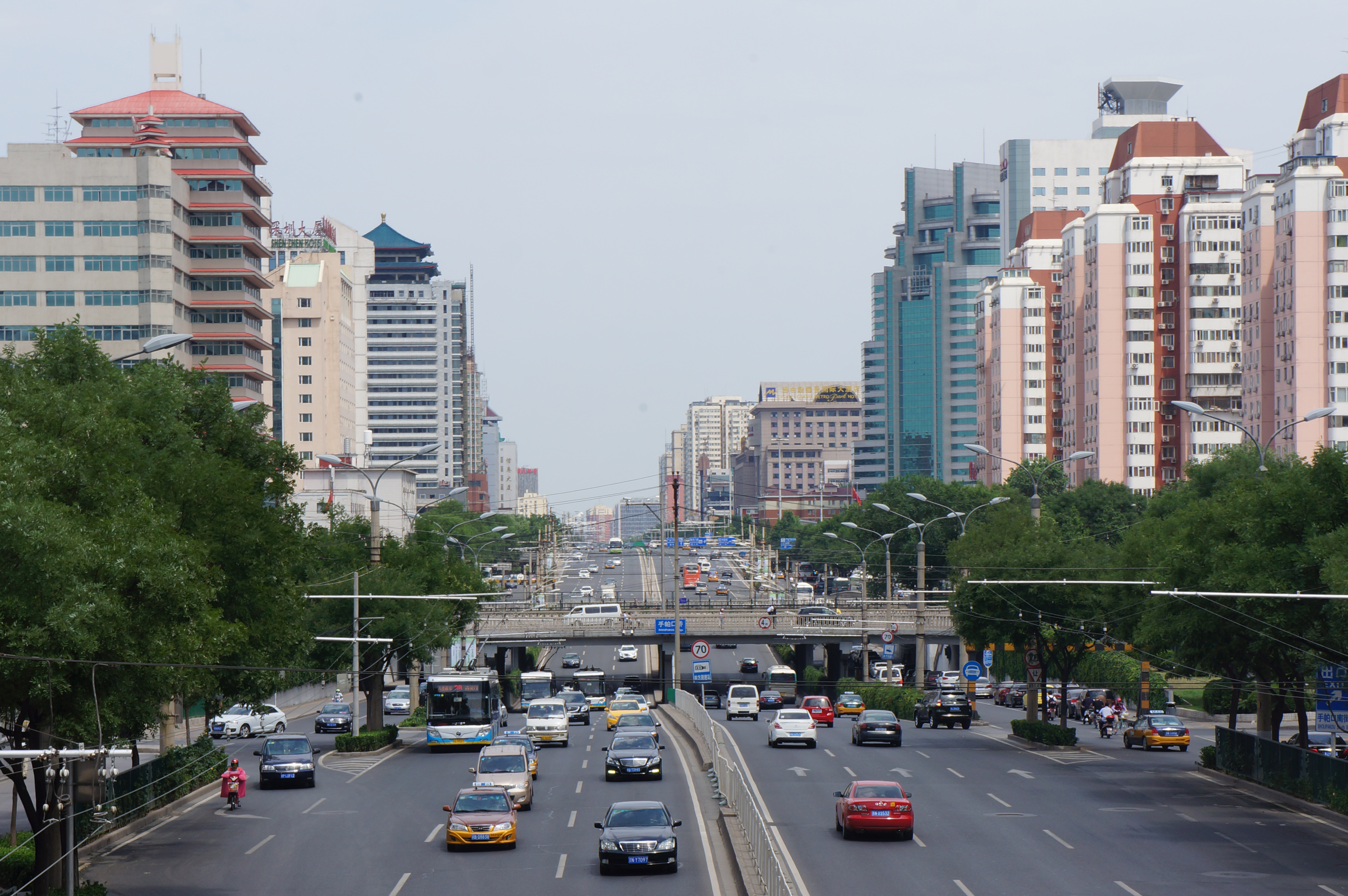
- Shoupakou Bridge within the subdistrict, 2016

- Location within Beijing Location within China
- Coordinates: 39°52′40″N 116°20′2″E
- Country: China
- Municipality: Beijing
- District: Xicheng

Area
  - Total: 5.49 km^{2} (2.12 sq mi)

Population (2020)
  - Total: 198,657
- Time zone: UTC+8 (China Standard)
- Postal code: 100055
- Area code: 010

Guang'anmenwai Subdistrict (Chinese: 广安门外街道; pinyin: Guǎng'ānménwài Jiēdào) is a subdistrict on the southwest corner of the Xicheng District, Beijing, China. As of 2020, it has a total population of 198,657.

The subdistrict got its name due to its location outside of Guang'anmen (Chinese: 广安门; lit. 'Gate of Expansive Peace') and the former Beijing city wall.

== History ==
Timetable of changes in the status of Guang'anmenwai Subdistrict
Time	Status
Liao dynasty	Part of Southern Capital
Jin dynasty	Part of Zhongdu
Yuan dynasty	Part of suburb of Dadu
Ming dynasty	Created as Guangningmen Borough of Wanping County
1946	Part of 4th Suburban District
1949	Guang'anmen Guanxiang Street Government was established
1950	Part of 12th District
1951	Street Government changed to Street Office
1952	Part of Xuanwu District
1954	Reorganized into Guang'anmenwai Subdistrict
1956	Following areas from Fengtai District were incorporated into Guang'anmenwai Subdistrict: Xiaomachang Village; Nanfengwo Village; Beiguanyin Village; Santongbei; Sanyi'ang Village; Ganshiqiao
1960	Reorganized into a commune. Liandao Subdistrict from Fengtai District was incorporated
1978	Changed back to a subdistrict

== Administrative Division ==
As of 2021, there are a total of 38 communities within the subdistrict:

Administrative Division Code	Community Name (English)	Community Name (Chinese)
110102020001	Yaziqiao	鸭子桥
110102020002	Qingnianhu	青年湖
110102020003	Chunshuguan	椿树馆
110102020004	Baicaiwan	白菜湾
110102020005	Chezhan Dongjie	车站东街
110102020006	Chezhan Xijie	车站西街
110102020007	Chezhan Xijie Shiwuhaoyuan	车站西街十五号院
110102020008	Hongju Nanjie	红居南街
110102020009	Hongjujie	红居街
110102020010	Shoupakou Nanjie	手帕口南街
110102020011	Langqinyuan	朗琴园
110102020012	Honglian Nanli	红莲南里
110102020013	Honglian Zhongli	红莲中里
110102020014	Honglian Beili	红莲北里
110102020015	Wanzijie	湾子街
110102020016	Maliandao	马连道
110102020017	Sanyili	三义里
110102020018	Maliandao Zhongli	马连道中里
110102020019	Sanyi Dongli	三义东里
110102020020	Lianhuahe	莲花河
110102020021	Xiaomachangxi	小马厂西
110102020022	Tianningsi Beili	天宁寺北里
110102020023	Tianningsi Nanli	天宁寺南里
110102020024	Shoupakou Beijie	手帕口北街
110102020025	Erre	二热
110102020026	Yuecheng	乐城
110102020028	Yilianxuan	依莲轩
110102020029	Diecui Huating	蝶翠华庭
110102020030	Zhongxin Jiayuan	中新佳园
110102020031	Chama Beijie	茶马北街
110102020032	Chama Nanjie	茶马南街
110102020033	Guangyuan	广源
110102020034	Jingtie Heyuan	京铁和园
110102020035	Xiaomachangdong	小马厂东
110102020036	Rongfengnan	荣丰南
110102020037	Rongfengbei	荣丰北
110102020038	Chayuan	茶源
110102020039	Mingyuan	名苑
