= Xinjiekou Subdistrict, Beijing =

Xinjiekou Subdistrict 新街口街道
- Subdistrict
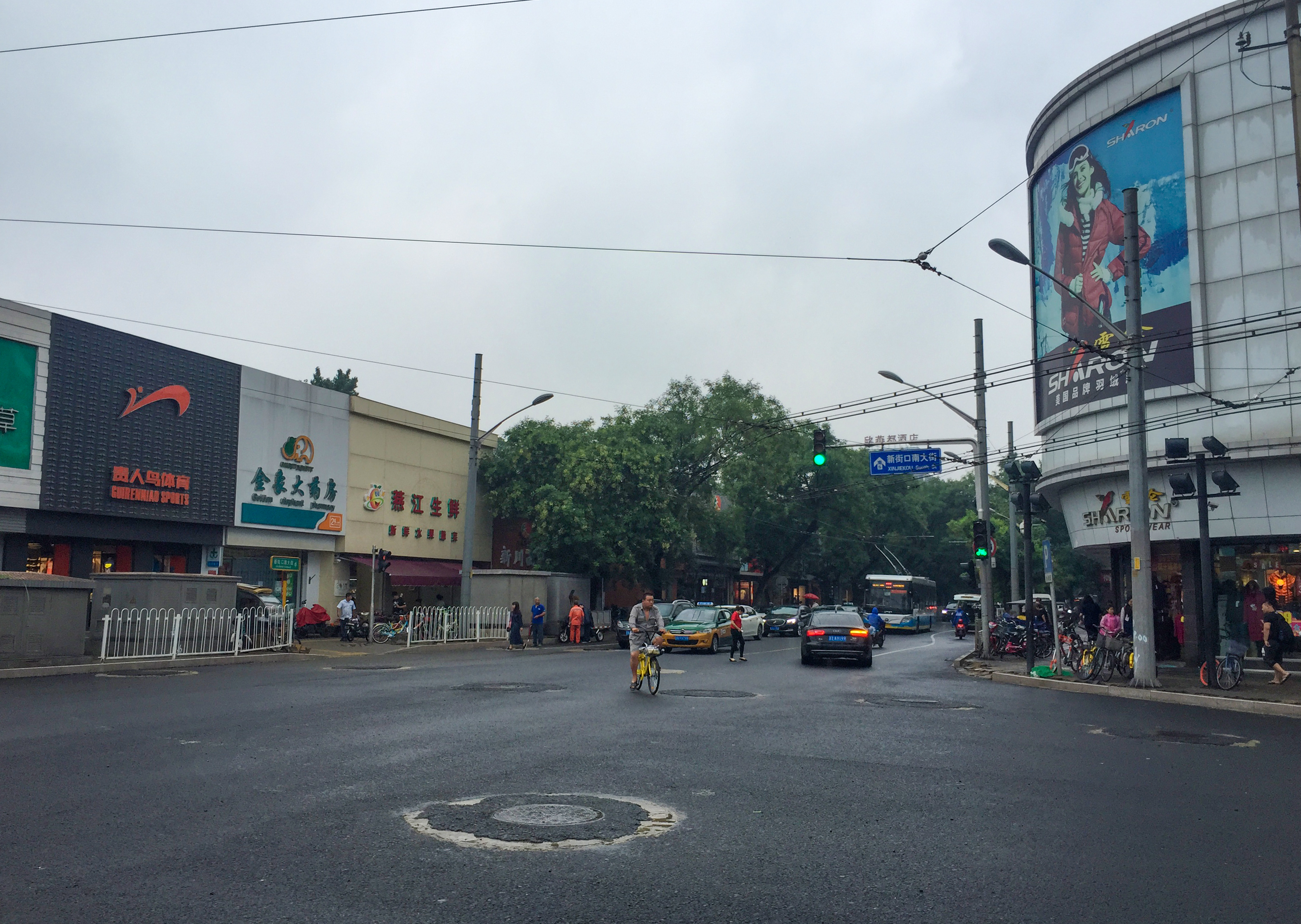
- Xinjiekou Subdistrict, Beijing, 2017

- Location within Beijing Location within China
- Coordinates: 39°56′30″N 116°21′53″E
- Country: China
- Municipality: Beijing
- District: Xicheng

Area
  - Total: 3.7 km^{2} (1.4 sq mi)

Population (2020)
  - Total: 84,866
  - Density: 23,000/km^{2} (59,000/sq mi)
- Time zone: UTC+8 (China Standard)
- Postal code: 100035
- Area code: 010

Xinjiekou (Chinese: 新街口; pinyin: Xīnjiēkǒu) is a subdistrict of Xicheng District (西城区) of Beijing, China. As of 2020, the subdistrict has a total population of 84,866.

The subdistrict got its name from a section of road on the eastern portion of Xizhimennei Avenue, which used to be a river port but underwent land reclamation in 1438. The newly created land was settled, and recorded as Xinjiekou (Chinese: 新街口; lit. 'New Intersection') in 1593.

== History ==
Timeline of changes in the status of Xinjiekou Subdistrict
Time	Status
Qing dynasty	Part of the Zhenghong and Zhenghuang Banners
1916	Created as Right 4th Inner District
1946	Renamed 4th Inner District
1949	Renamed 4th District
1952	Renamed 4th Western District
1958	Reformed as Xinjiekou Subdistrict and Transferred under Xicheng District.
2004	Land west of Xinjiekoubei Avenue and former Fusuijing Subdistrict were incorporated

== Administrative Division ==
By 2021, It is divided into the following village-level divisions:

Administrative Division Code	Community Name in English	Community Name in Chinese
110102003015	Xili Second District	西里二区
110102003020	Xili First District	西里一区
110102003025	Xili Fourth District	西里四区
110102003026	Beicaochang	北草厂
110102003028	Xili Third District	西里三区
110102003032	Yutaoyuan	玉桃园
110102003033	Xisibei Toutiao	西四北头条
110102003034	Xisibei Santiao	西四北三条
110102003035	Xisibei Liutiao	西四北六条
110102003036	Yude	育德
110102003037	Qiangongyong	前公用
110102003038	Banbijie	半壁街
110102003039	Nanxiaojie	南小街
110102003040	Guanyingyuan	冠英园
110102003042	Dajue	大觉
110102003043	Fuguoli	富国里
110102003045	Anpingxiang	安平巷
110102003046	Guanyuan	官园
110102003048	Gongmenkou	宫门口
110102003049	Beishun	北顺
110102003050	Zhongzhi	中直

== Landmarks ==
- Miaoying Temple
- Guangji Temple
- Beijing Lu Xun Museum
- Guanghua Temple

== See also ==
- Xinjiekou (Nanjing)
