= Xicheng, Beijing =

Xicheng 西城区 Hsicheng
- District
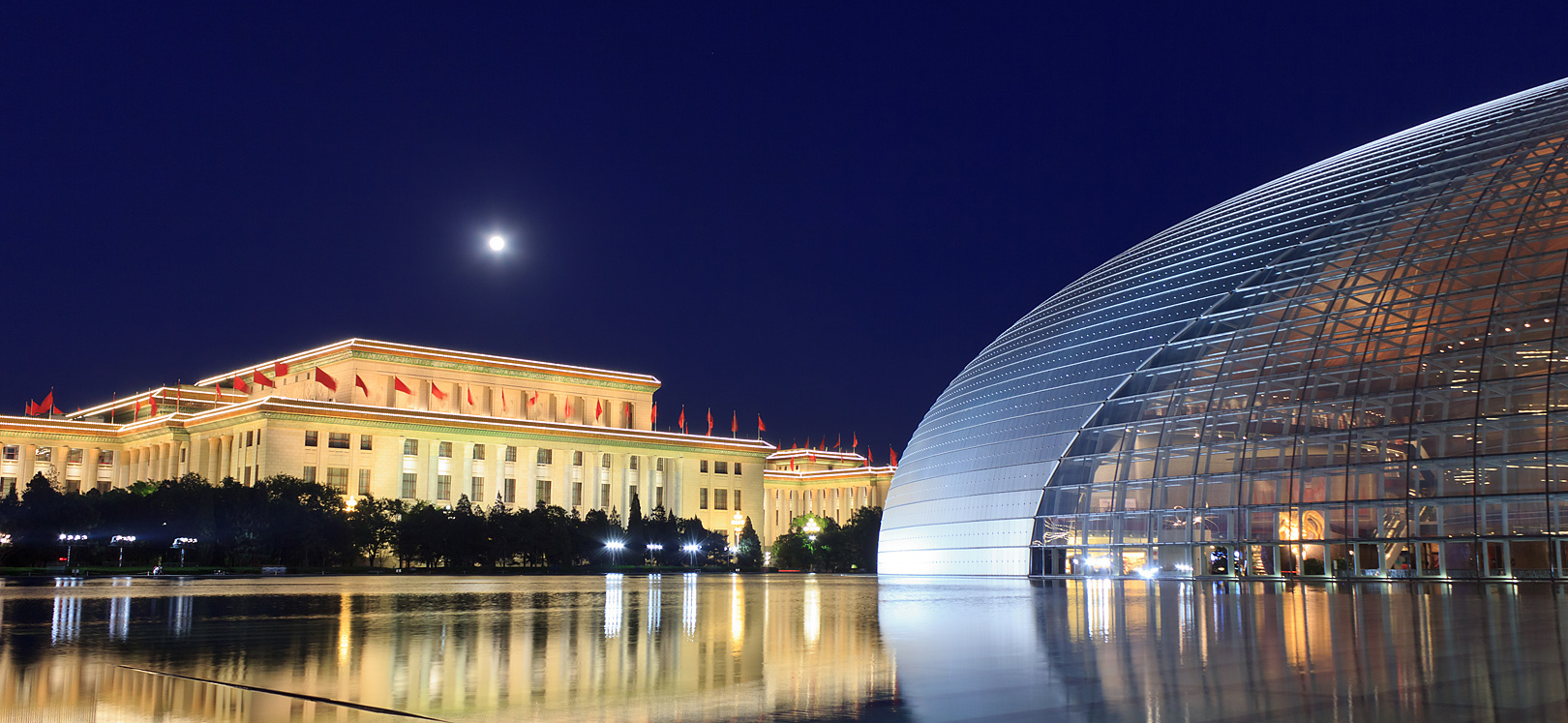
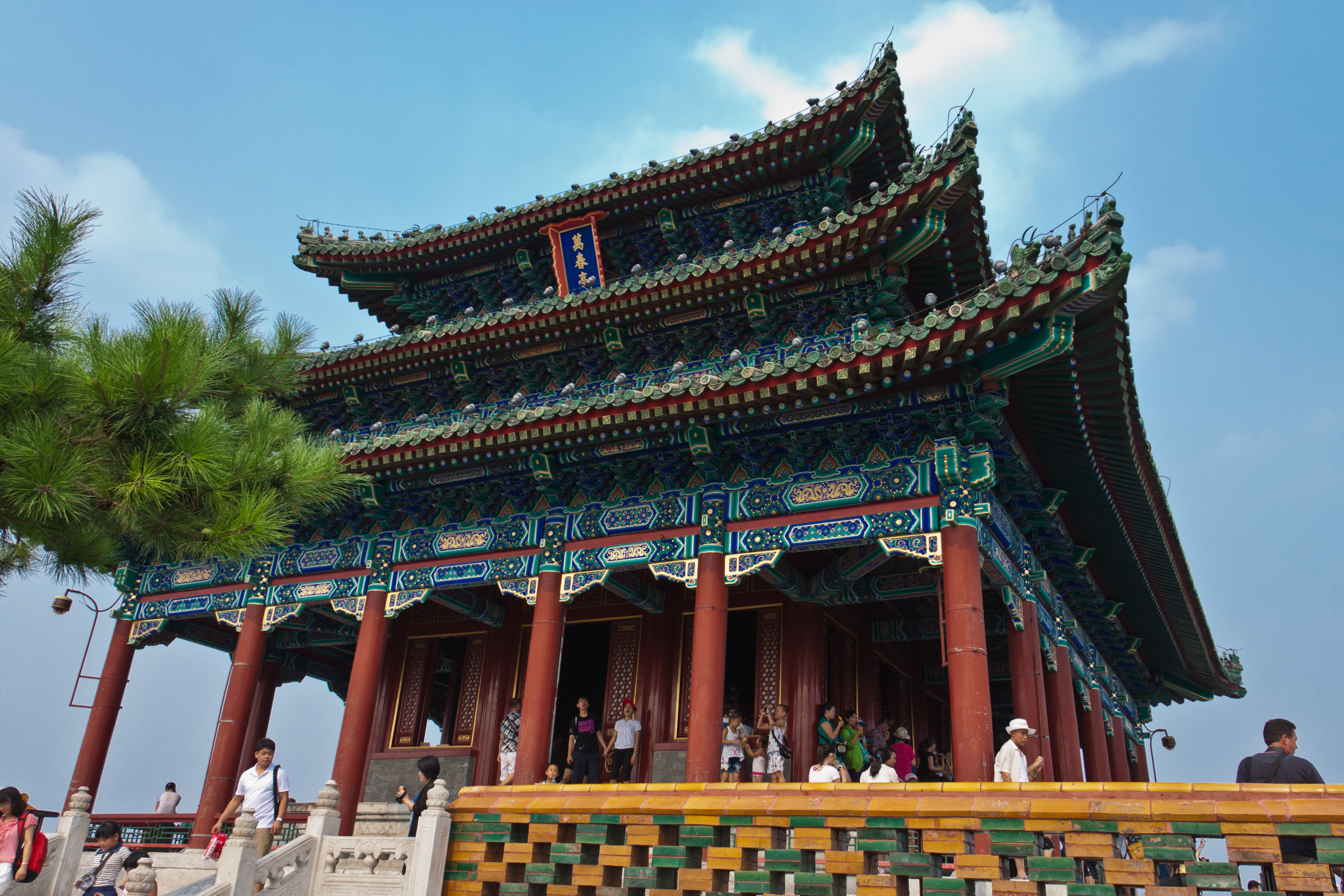
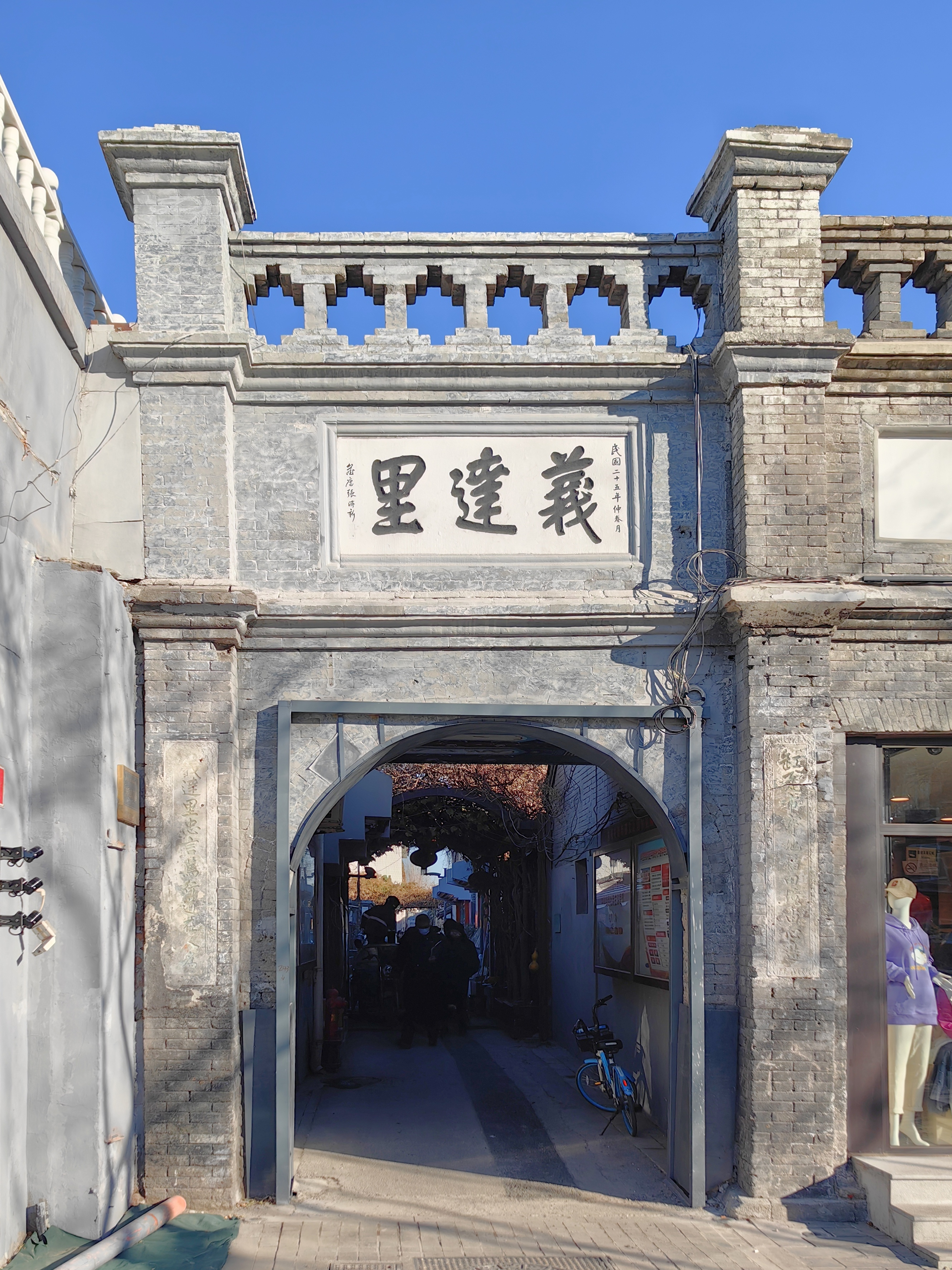
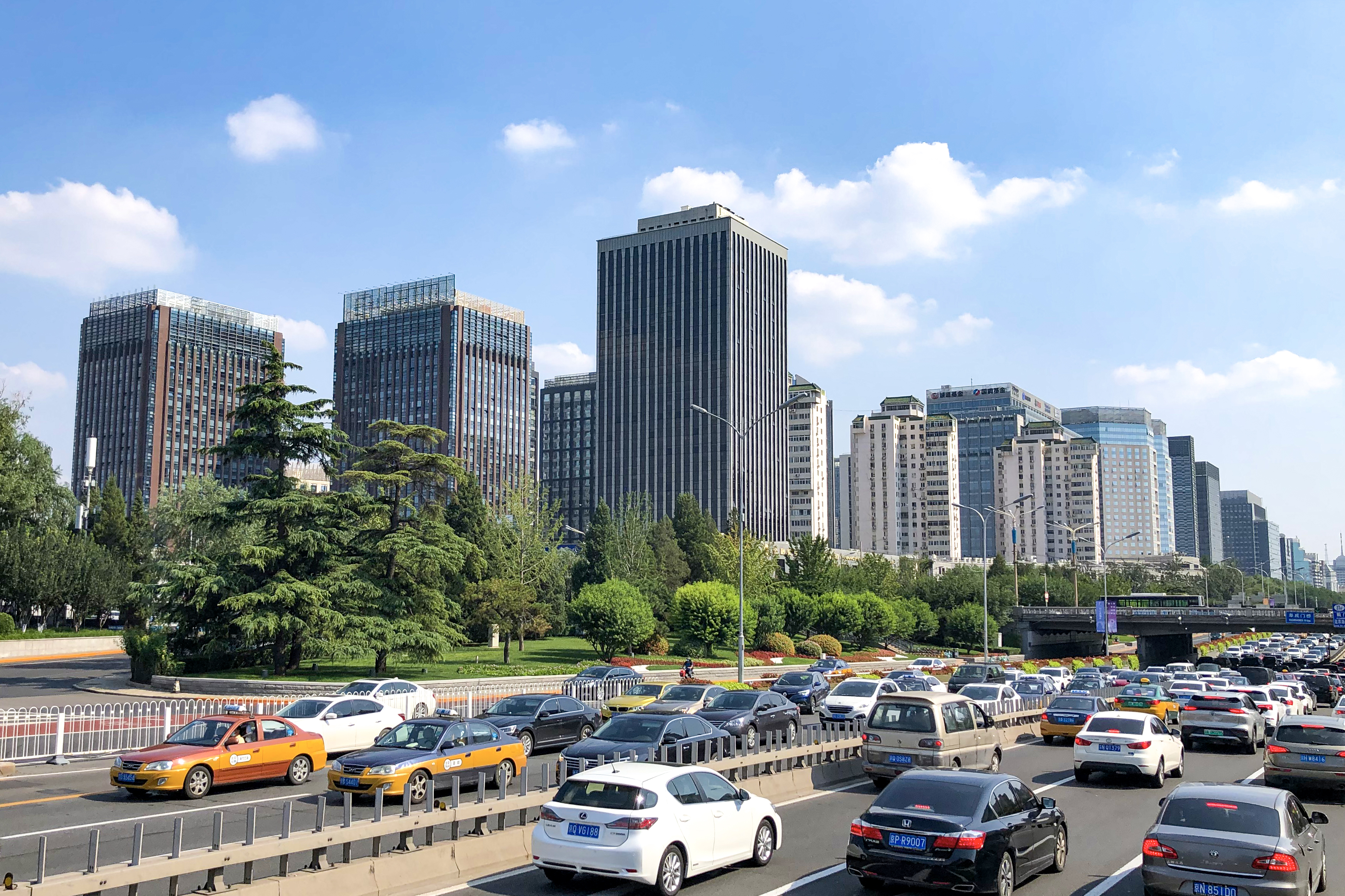
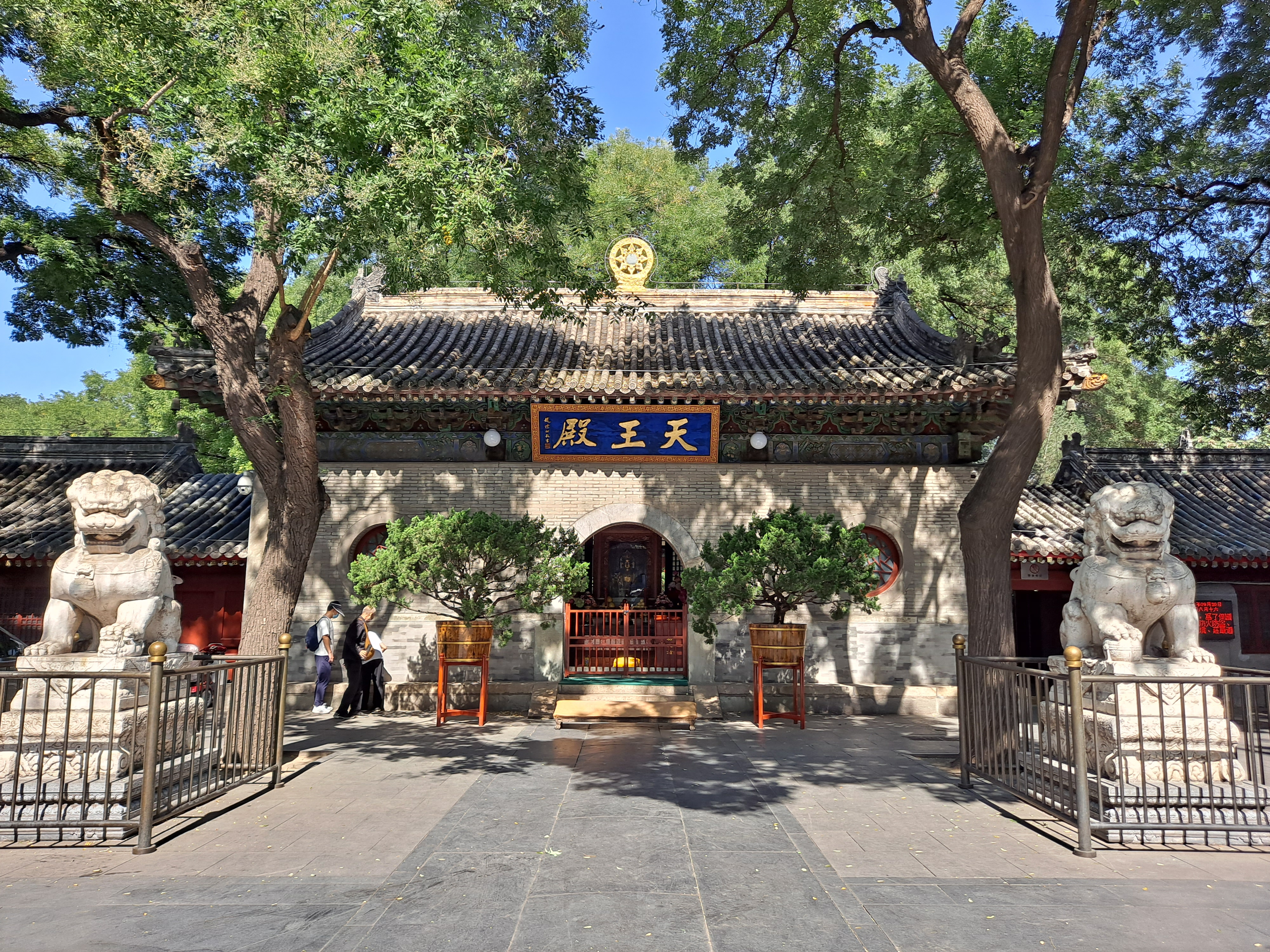
- Great Hall of the People and National Centre for the Performing Arts Jingshan Yidali Beijing Financial Street Guangji Temple

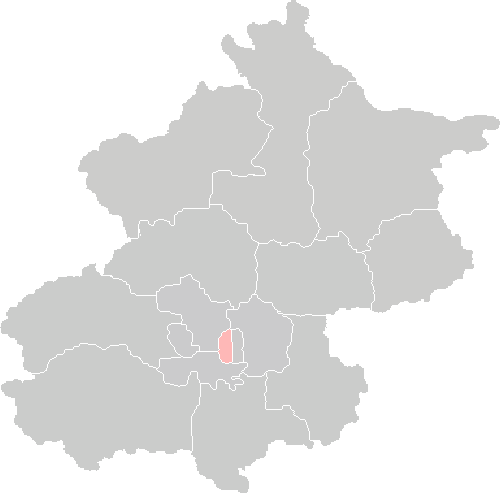
- Location of Xicheng District in Beijing
- Coordinates: 39°54′36″N 116°21′36″E
- Country: People's Republic of China
- Municipality: Beijing
- Township-level divisions: 15 subdistricts

Area
  - Total: 50.7 km^{2} (19.6 sq mi)

Population (2020 census)
  - Total: 1,106,214
  - Density: 21,800/km^{2} (56,500/sq mi)
- Time zone: UTC+08:00 (China Standard)
- Postal code: 100032, 100054
- Area code: 0010
- GDP (nominal) (2025): 2025
- Total: ¥631 billion $88.39 billion (nominal)
- Per capita: ¥578,735 $81,022 (nominal)
- Website: www.bjxch.gov.cn

Xicheng (Chinese: 西城区; pinyin: Xīchéng Qū; lit. 'West City District') is a district of the city of Beijing. Its 32 square kilometers (12 sq mi) cover the western half of the old city (largely inside the 2nd Ring Road; the eastern half is Dongcheng District), and has 1,106,214 inhabitants (2020 census). Its postal code is 100032. Xicheng is subdivided into 15 subdistricts of the city proper of Beijing. The former Xuanwu District was merged into Xicheng in July 2010.

The Xidan commercial district, Beijing Financial Street, Beihai Park, Jingshan Park, Shichahai, and Zhongnanhai are all within its jurisdiction. The popular Houhai bar area is also in district. Before the 1911 Revolution, most royalty and aristocrats resided in the precinct. The oldest Catholic church in Beijing, the Cathedral of the Immaculate Conception is located in Xicheng.

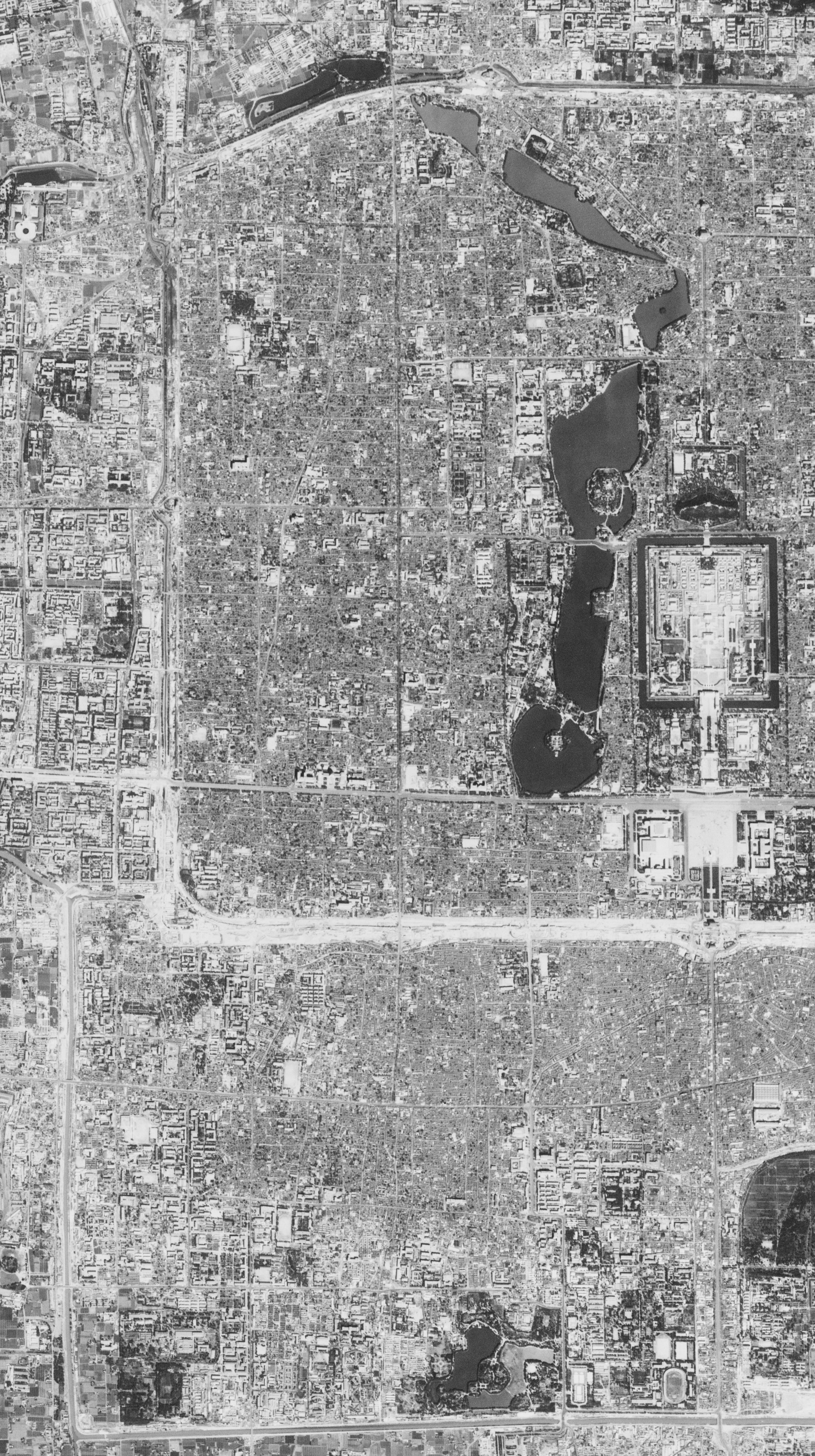
Satellite image of Xicheng District in September 1967

== Administrative divisions ==
There are 15 subdistricts in the district:

Name	Chinese (S)	Hanyu Pinyin	Population (2010)	Area (km^{2})
Financial Street Subdistrict	金融街街道	Jīnróngjiē Jiēdào	67,888	3.78
Xichang'anjie Subdistrict	西长安街街道	Xīcháng'ānjiē Jiēdào	51,477	4.24
Xinjiekou Subdistrict	新街口街道	Xīnjiēkǒu Jiēdào	95,497	3.70
Yuetan Subdistrict	月坛街道	Yuètán Jiēdào	116,543	4.13
Zhanlanlu Subdistrict	展览路街道	Zhǎnlǎnlù Jiēdào	130,925	5.87
Desheng Subdistrict	德胜街道	Déshèng Jiēdào	116,768	4.14
Shichahai Subdistrict	什刹海街道	Shénshāhǎi Jiēdào	95,433	5.80
Dashilan Subdistrict	大栅栏街道	Dàshilànr Jiēdào	36,997	1.27
Tianqiao Subdistrict	天桥街道	Tiānqiáo Jiēdào	46,385	2.07
Chunshu Subdistrict	椿树街道	Chūn shù Jiēdào	30,547	1.08
Taoranting Subdistrict	陶然亭街道	Táorán tíng Jiēdào	43,455	2.14
Guang'anmennei Subdistrict	广安门内街道	Guǎng'ānménnèi Jiēdào	73,692	2.43
Niujie Subdistrict	牛街街道	Niújiē Jiēdào	51,877	1.44
Baizhifang Subdistrict	白纸坊街道	Báizhǐfāng Jiēdào	95,737	3.11
Guang'anmenwai Subdistrict	广安门外街道	Guǎng'ānménwài Jiēdào	179,536	5.49

== Economy ==
The district's 2025 gross domestic product amounts to an estimated CN¥631.4 billion (US$88.39 billion). Its GDP per capita in 2025 was CN¥578,735, corresponding to around US$81,022 by nominal values.

COSCO has its headquarters in the Ocean Plaza building in Xicheng. The Xinhua News Agency has its headquarters in the Dacheng Plaza (大成大厦 Dàchéng Dàshà) in Xicheng.

In addition Bank of China, China Construction Bank, the State Grid Corporation of China, China National Nuclear Corporation, and Taikang Life Insurance also have their headquarters in Xicheng.

=== Government ===
The Chinese Ministry of Education is headquartered in Xidan, Xicheng District.

The Chinese Academy of Sciences is headquartered in Xicheng District.

The China Food and Drug Administration is headquartered in Xicheng District.

The Hong Kong and Macau Affairs Office headquarters is in Xicheng District. The Office of the Government of the HKSAR in Beijing is in Xicheng District.

== Important areas in Xicheng District ==
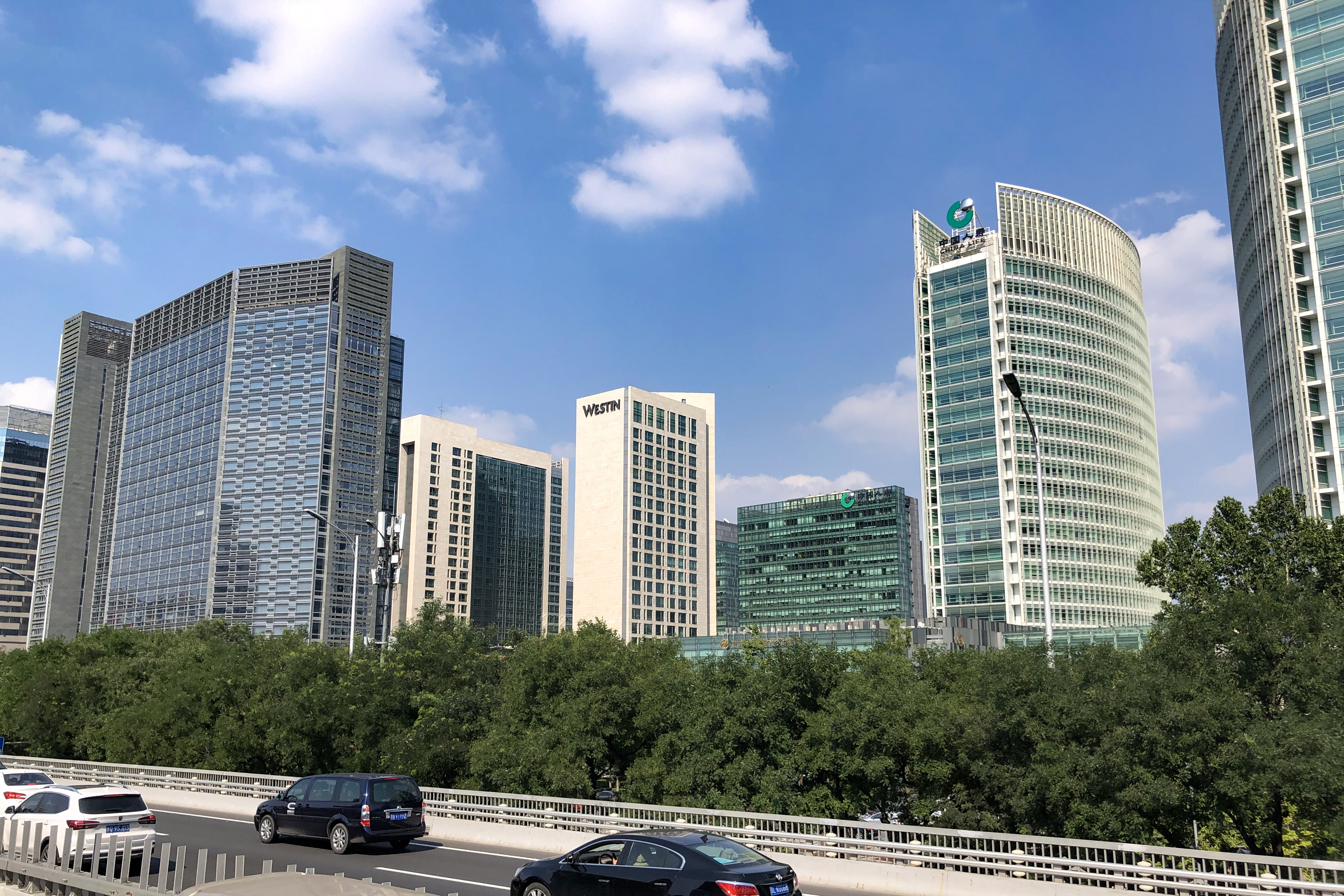
Beijing Financial Street

- Imperial City
- Beijing Financial Street
- Zhongnanhai
- Beihai Park
- Jingshan Park
- Shichahai
- Drum Tower and Bell Tower
- Prince Gong's Residence (Gongwang Fu)
- Xinjiekou
- Xidan
- Xisi
- Qianmen
- Dashilar
- Liulichang (an ancient antiques market since Qing dynasty)
- Beijing Zoo
- Fayuan Temple
- Huguang Guild Hall
- Miaoying Temple
- Niujie Mosque

== Transport ==
=== Metro ===
Xicheng is served by seven metro lines of the Beijing Subway:

- Line 1 - Muxidi, Nanlishilu, Fuxingmen 2 , Xidan 4 , Tian'anmen West
- Line 2 - Guloudajie 8 , Jishuitan, Xizhimen 4 14 , Chegongzhuang 6 , Fuchengmen, Fuxingmen 1 , Changchunjie, Xuanwumen 4 , Hepingmen
- Line 4 - Xizhimen 2 13 , Xinjiekou, Ping'anli 6 , Xisi, Lingjing Hutong, Xidan 1 , Xuanwumen 2 , Caishikou 7 , Taoranting
- Line 6 - Chegongzhuang West, Chegongzhuang 2 , Ping'anli 4 , Beihai North
- Line 7 - Wanzi, Daguanying, Guang'anmennei, Caishikou 4 , Hufangqiao
- Line 8 - Anhua Qiao, Guloudajie 2 , Shichahai, Zhushikou 7 , Tianqiao
- Line 13 - Xizhimen 2 4

=== Suburban Railway ===
Xicheng is served by one commuter line operated by Beijing Suburban Railway (BCR).

- Huairou–Miyun line - Beijing North railway station

== Education ==
=== Primary and secondary schools ===
The High School Affiliated to Beijing Normal University is in Xicheng; it was located in Xuanwu District before Xicheng absorbed Xuanwu. Beijing No.4 High School is also in Xicheng District.

One school in Niujie, the Beijing Xuanwu Huimin Elementary School (S: 北京市宣武回民小学, P: Běijīng Shì Xuānwǔ Huímín Xiǎoxué), serves the Hui people living in the area. It used to be in Xuanwu District.

The Beijing Municipal Commission of Education (simplified Chinese: 北京市教育委员会; traditional Chinese: 北京市教育委員會; pinyin: Běijīng Shì Jiàoyùwěiyuánhuì), the local education authority, used to be headquartered in Xicheng District.

=== Post-secondary schools ===
- People's Public Security University of China
- Central Conservatory of Music is based in Xicheng, near Fuxingmen and Changchunjie stations.
