= Xueyuanlu Subdistrict =

Xueyuanlu Subdistrict 学院路街道
- Subdistrict
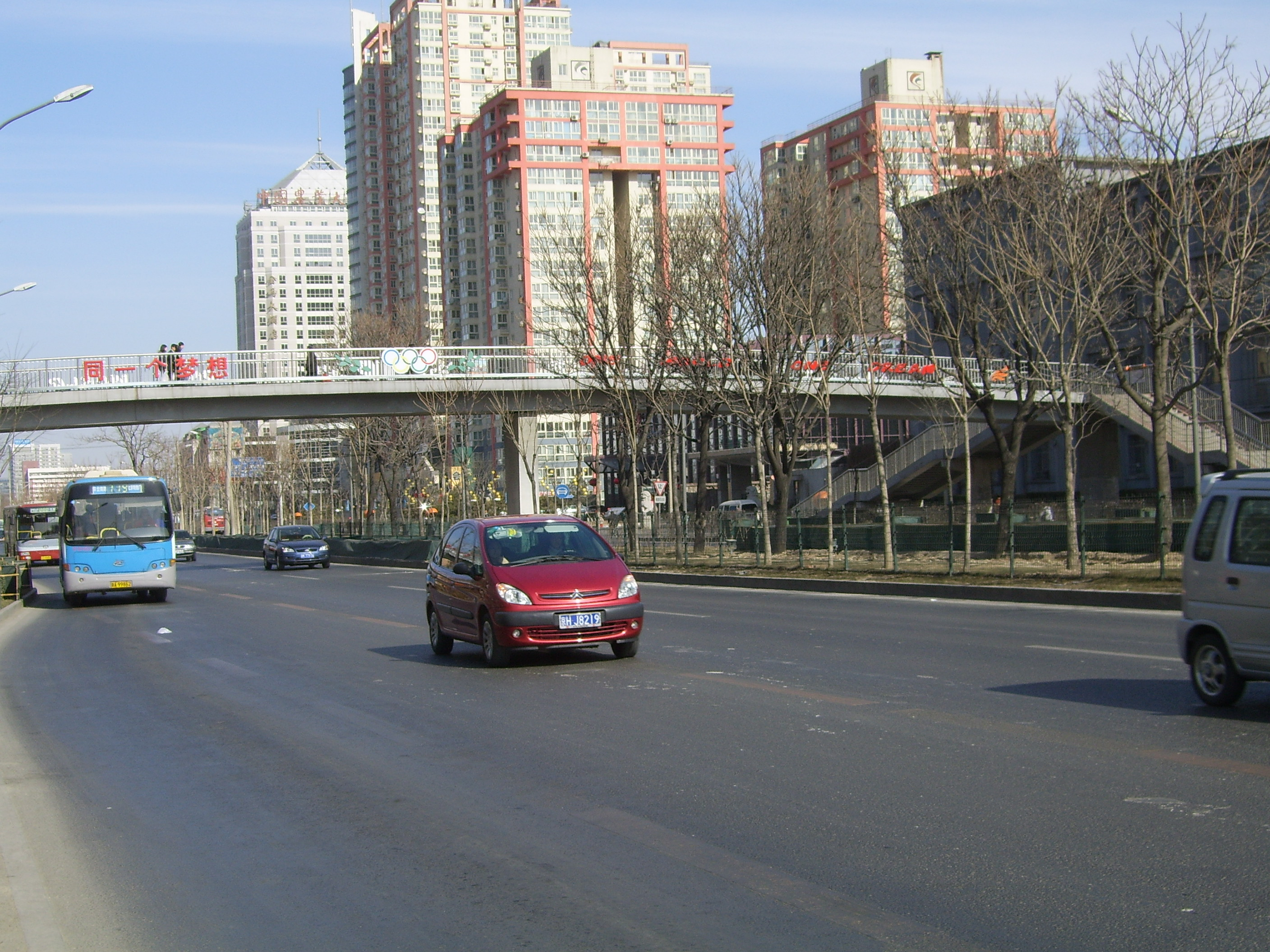
- Xueyuan Road that passes through the Subdistrict, 2007

- Location within Beijing Location within China
- Coordinates: 39°59′32″N 116°20′45″E
- Country: China
- Municipality: Beijing
- District: Haidian
- Village-level Divisions: 30 communities

Area
  - Total: 8.49 km^{2} (3.28 sq mi)

Population (2020)
  - Total: 226,315
  - Density: 26,700/km^{2} (69,000/sq mi)
- Time zone: UTC+8 (China Standard)
- Postal code: 100083
- Area code: 010

Xueyuanlu Subdistrict (Chinese: 学院路街道; pinyin: Xuéyuànlù Jiēdào) is a subdistrict on the east side of Haidian District, Beijing, China. It shares border with Qinghe Subdistrict to its north, Aoyuncun and Yayuncun Subdistricts to its east, Huayuanlu Subdistrict to its south, Zhongguancun Subdistrict and Dongsheng Town to its west. It had 226,315 residents as of 2020.

The subdistrict‘s name Xueyuanlu (Chinese: 学院路; lit. 'Academy Road') came from a road that runs through the subdistrict, which in turn was named so for the concentration of universities around the area, including University of Science and Technology Beijing, China Agricultural University and Beijing Language and Culture University, among others.

== History ==
Timeline of Xueyuanlu Subdistrict History
Year	Status
1912	Part of Beijiao District
1949	Part of the 12th Township, under the 14th District
1963	Established as Wudaokou Subdistrict
1968	Renamed to Dongshenglu Subdistrict
1991	Renamed to Xueyuanlu Subdistrict
2000	Land south of 4th Ring Road were split away to form Huayuanlu Subdistrict

== Administrative Divisions ==
As of 2021, Xueyuanlu Subdistrict was made up of 30 communities:

Administrative division code	Subdivision names	Name transliteration
110108010001	西王庄	Xiwangzhuang
110108010002	六道口	Liudaokou
110108010004	志新	Zhixin
110108010007	二里庄	Erlizhuang
110108010008	东王庄	Dongwangzhuang
110108010009	学知园	Xuezhiyuan
110108010011	地大第二	Dida Di'er
110108010013	健翔园	Jianxiangyuan
110108010014	建清园	Jianqingyuan
110108010016	地大第一	Dida Diyi
110108010017	北科大	Beikeda
110108010018	石油大院	Shiyou Dayuan
110108010019	中国农业大学东校区	Zhongguo Nongye Daxue Dongxiaoqu
110108010020	语言大学	Yuyan Daxue
110108010021	石科院	Shikeyuan
110108010022	十五所	Shiwusuo
110108010023	林业大学	Linye Daxue
110108010024	静淑苑	Jingshuyuan
110108010025	城建四	Chengjiansi
110108010026	768厂	768 Chang
110108010027	中国矿业大学（北京）	Zhongguo Kuangye Daxue (Beijing)
110108010028	中科院	Zhongkeyuan
110108010029	二里庄干休所	Erlizhuang Ganxiusuo
110108010031	富润	Furun
110108010032	逸成	Yicheng
110108010033	展春园	Zhanchunyuan
110108010034	城华清枫	Chenghua Qingfeng
110108010035	学清苑	Xueqingyuan
110108010036	五道口嘉园	Wudaokou Jiayuan
110108010037	月清园	Yueqingyuan

== See also ==
- List of township-level divisions of Beijing
