= Desheng Subdistrict, Beijing =

Desheng Subdistrict 德胜街道
- Subdistrict
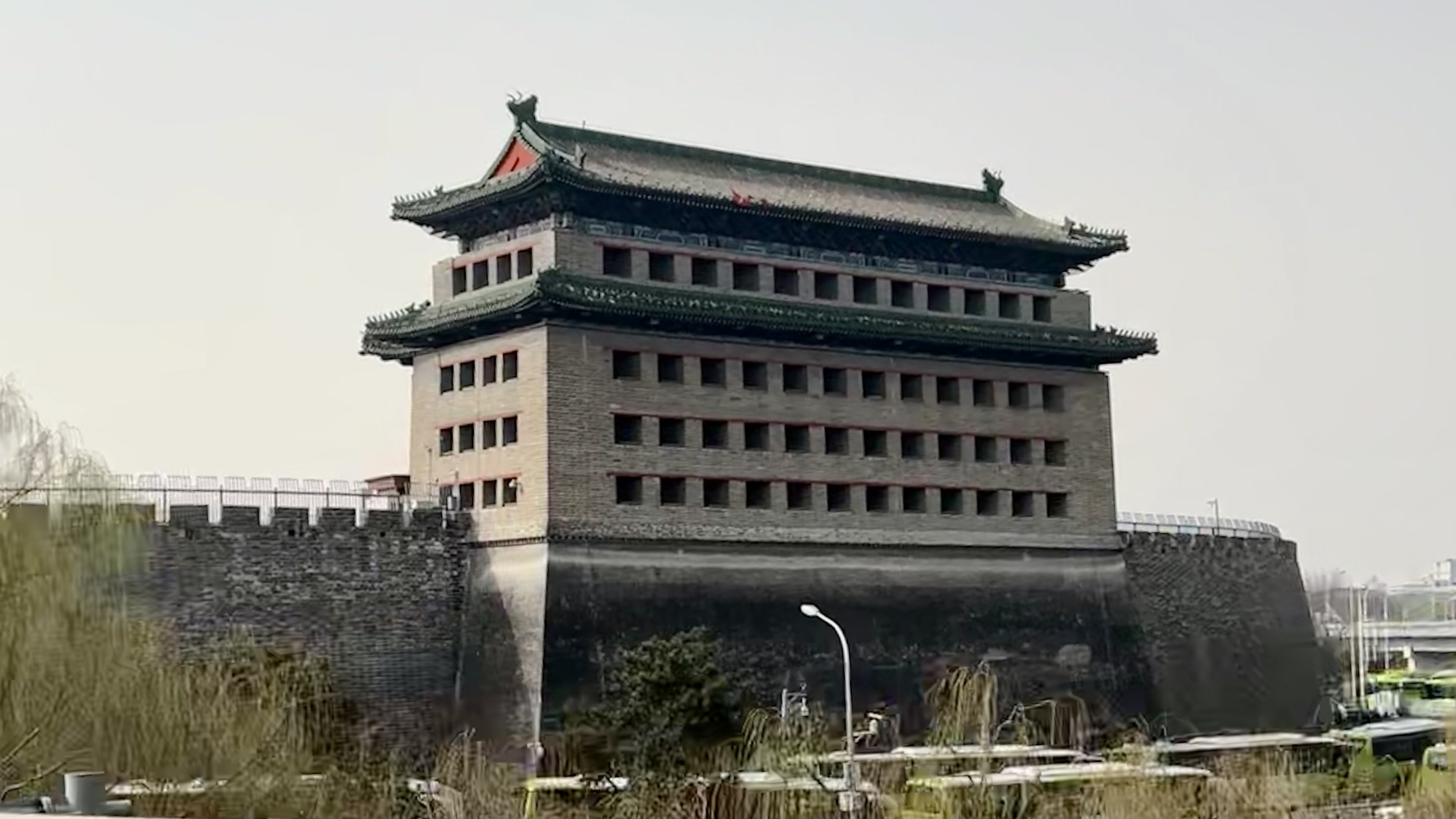
- Deshengmen, a former city gate in the subdistrict, 2022

- Location within Beijing Location within China
- Coordinates: 39°57′15″N 116°22′53″E
- Country: China
- Municipality: Beijing
- District: Xicheng

Area
  - Total: 4.1 km^{2} (1.6 sq mi)

Population (2020)
  - Total: 116,338
  - Density: 28,000/km^{2} (73,000/sq mi)
- Time zone: UTC+8 (China Standard)
- Postal code: 100011
- Area code: 010

Desheng Subdistrict (Chinese: 德胜街道; pinyin: Déshèng Jiēdào) is a subdistrict on the northern end of the Xicheng District, Beijing, China. As of 2020, it has a total population of 116,338.

This subdistrict was named after Deshengmen (Chinese: 德胜门; lit. 'Gate of Virtuous Triumph'), a city gate on the now demolished Beijing city wall.

== History ==
Timeline of changes in the status of Desheng Subdistrict
Time	Status
Qing dynasty	Part of Zhenghuang Banner, Northern City
1912	Part of North Suburban District
1949	Part of 16th District
1952	Part of Xisi District
1958	Created as Deshengmenwai Subdistrict and transferred under Xicheng District. Later renamed Dewai Subdistrict
2004	Renamed Desheng Subdistrict

== Administrative Division ==
In 2021, the Desheng Subdistrict has the following communities:

Administrative Division Code	Community Name in English	Community Name in Chinese
110102010002	Andelunan	安德路南
110102010005	Andelubei	安德路北
110102010011	Deshengli	德胜里
110102010013	Dewai Dajiexi	德外大街西
110102010017	Xinming Jiayuan	新明家园
110102010019	Xinfeng Zhongzhi	新风中直
110102010021	Xinwai Dajiebei	新外大街北
110102010022	Xinkang	新康
110102010024	Madian	马甸
110102010025	Rendinghu Xili	人定湖西里
110102010026	Huangsi Dajiexi	黄寺大街西
110102010029	Shuangqigan	双旗杆
110102010031	Beiguang	北广
110102010033	Huangsi Dajie 24	黄寺大街24号
110102010036	Yuzhong Xili	裕中西里
110102010038	Yuzhong Dongli	裕中东里
110102010039	Yangguang Lijing	阳光丽景
110102010043	Dewai Dajiedong	德外大街东
110102010044	Liupukangbei Xiaojie	六铺炕北小街
110102010045	Liupukangnan Xiaojie	六铺炕南小街

== Landmark ==
- Deshengmen

== See also ==
- List of township-level divisions of Beijing
