= Zhanlanlu Subdistrict =

Zhanlanlu Subdistrict 展览路街道
- Subdistrict
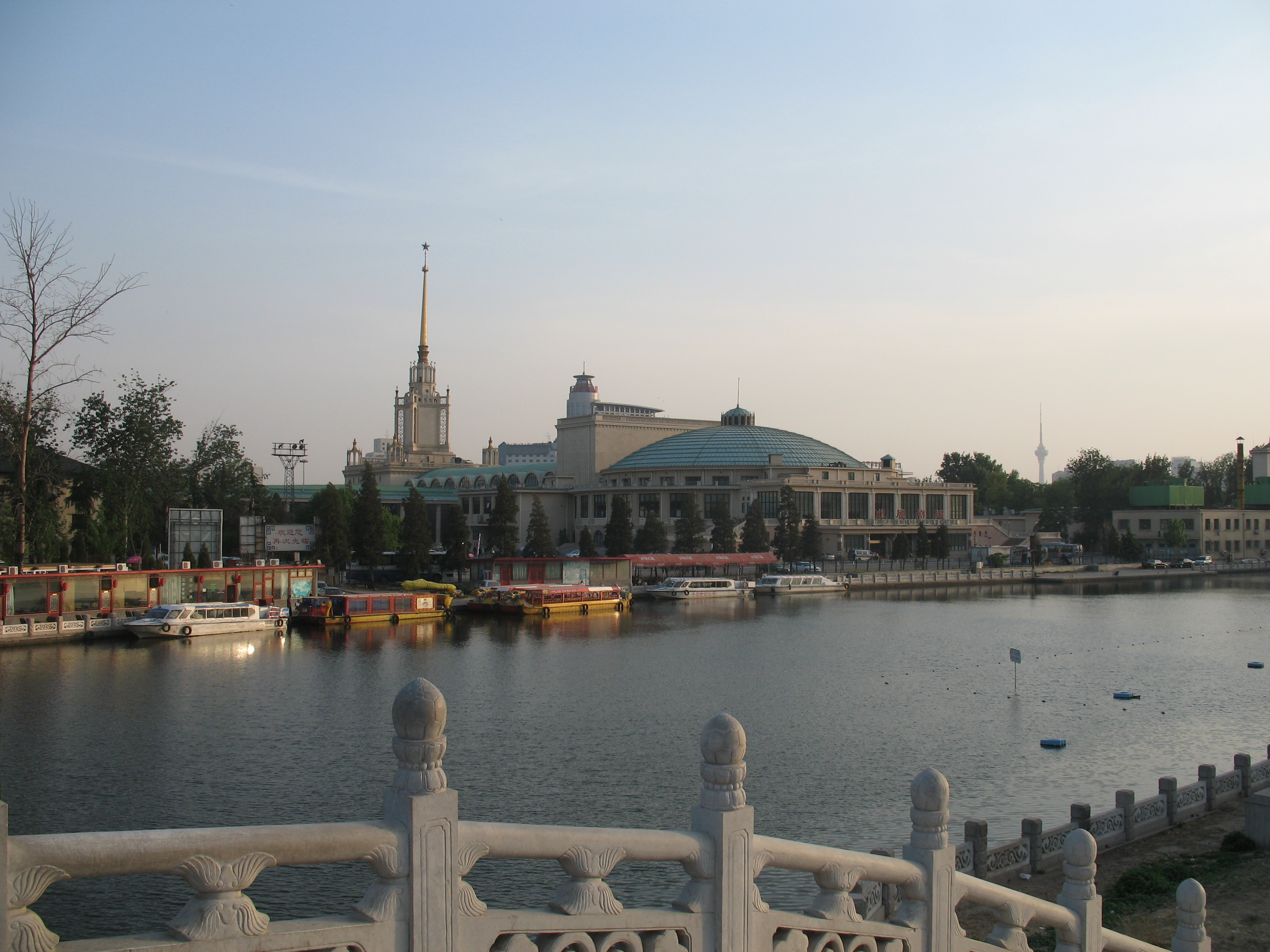
- Beijing Exhibition Center within the subdistrict, 2007

- Location within Beijing Location within China
- Coordinates: 39°55′53″N 116°20′12″E
- Country: China
- Municipality: Beijing
- District: Xicheng

Area
  - Total: 5.87 km^{2} (2.27 sq mi)

Population (2020)
  - Total: 114,831
  - Density: 19,600/km^{2} (50,700/sq mi)
- Time zone: UTC+8 (China Standard)
- Postal code: 100037
- Area code: 010

Zhanlanlu Subdistrict, or Zhanlanlu Subdistrict (Chinese: 展览路街道; pinyin: Zhǎnlǎnlù Jiēdào) is a subdistrict in the northwest portion of Xicheng District, Beijing, China. In 2020 its population is 114,831.

This subdistrict got its name due to the Beijing Exhibition Center within it.

== History ==
Timeline of changes in the status of Zhanlanlu Subdistrict
Time	Status
Qing dynasty	Part of Guanwai Ward
1912	Part of 2nd Inner, 4th Inner, West Suburban and 6th Suburban Districts.
1949	Part of 2nd, 4th and 16th Districts
1950	Part of 2nd, 4th and 13th Districts
1952	Part of Xidan, Xisi and Haidian Districts
1958	Formally created as Zhanlanlu Subdistrict, as transferred under Xicheng District
1980	Area south of Baiwangzhuang Avenue and north of Fuwai Avenue were transferred to Fuwai Subdistrict
2004	Fuwai Subdistrict was incorporated into Zhanlanlu Subdistrict

== Administrative Division ==
As of 2021, there are a total of 22 communities in the subdistrict:

Administrative Division Code	Community Name in English	Community Name in Chinese
110102009001	Wenxingjie	文兴街
110102009002	Chaoyang'an	朝阳庵
110102009005	Santa	三塔
110102009008	Xinhuanan	新华南
110102009009	Baiwanzhuangdong	百万庄东
110102009011	BaiwanzhuangXi	百万庄西
110102009013	Chegongzhuang	车公庄
110102009014	Xinhuadong	新华东
110102009016	Xinhuali	新华里
110102009017	Yushuguan	榆树馆
110102009020	Debao	德宝
110102009023	Tuanjie	团结
110102009026	Beiyingfang Xili	北营房西里
110102009028	Beiyingfang Dongli	北营房东里
110102009031	Huangguayuan	黄瓜园
110102009032	Luyuan	露园
110102009035	Fuwaixi	阜外西
110102009036	Hongmaogou	洪茂沟
110102009038	Fuwaidong	阜外东
110102009039	Nanyingfang	南营房
110102009041	Wanmingyuan	万明园
110102009042	Binhe	滨河
110102009043	Kouzhong	扣钟

== Landmark ==
- Beijing Zoo
- Beijing Exhibition Center
- Zhalan Cemetery
- Beijing Planetarium
