= Yuetan Subdistrict =

Yuetan Subdistrict 月坛街道
- Subdistrict
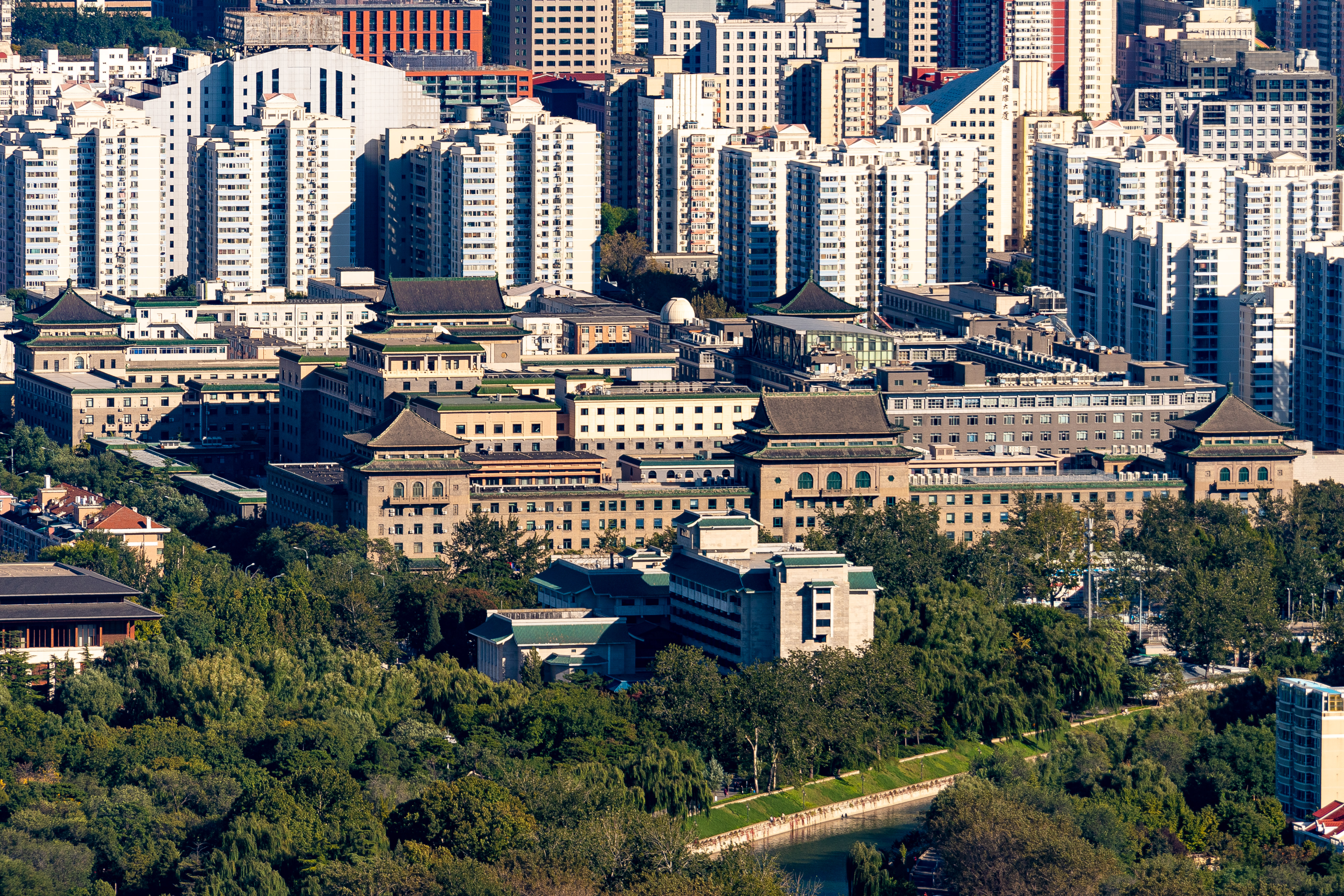
- Four Ministries and One Commission Building Complex, Yuetan Subdistrict, 2021

- Location within Beijing Location within China
- Coordinates: 39°54′48″N 116°20′19″E
- Country: China
- Municipality: Beijing
- District: Xicheng

Area
  - Total: 4.13 km^{2} (1.59 sq mi)

Population (2020)
  - Total: 97,771
  - Density: 23,700/km^{2} (61,300/sq mi)
- Time zone: UTC+8 (China Standard)
- Postal code: 100045
- Area code: 010

Yuetan Subdistrict (Chinese: 月坛街道; pinyin: Yuètán Jiēdào) is a subdistrict on the western side of Xicheng District, Beijing, China. As of 2020, its total population is 97,771.

The subdistrict was named after the Temple of the Moon within it.

== History ==
Timelin of changes in the status of Yuetan Subdistrict
Time	Status
Ming and Qing dynasty	Part of Wanping County, Shuntian Prefecture
1912	Part of Wanping County, Jingzhao Prefecture
1925	Part of West Suburban District
1945	Part of 4th Suburban District
1949	Part of 13th District
1952	13th District was renamed Haidian District
1953	Three townships were formed: Zhenwumiao, Nanyingfang and Sanheli
1956	Merged into Zhenwumiao and Nanyingfang Subdistricts, and transferred under Xidan District
1958	Combined into Yuetan Subdistrict. Transferred under Xicheng District
1980	Land north of Yuetanbei Street and South of Fuchengmenwai Avenue were transferred to Fuwai Subdistrict.

== Administrative Division ==
As of 2021, there are a total of 26 communities within Yuetan Subdistrict:

Administrative Division Code	Community Name in English	Community Name in Simplified Chinese
110102007003	Yuetan	月坛
110102007004	Shehuilu	社会路
110102007005	Tiedaobu Zhuzhaiqu Disan	铁道部住宅区第三
110102007006	Sanheli Yiqu	三里河一区
110102007010	Nanshagou	南沙沟
110102007011	Fuxingmen Beidajie	复兴门北大街
110102007013	Tiedaobu Zhuzhaiqu Dier Er	铁道部住宅区第二、二
110102007016	Fuxingmenwai Dajie Jiaqihaoyuan	复兴门外大街甲7号院
110102007018	Sanlihe Erqu	三里河二区
110102007020	Sanlihe Sanqu Diyi	三里河三区第一
110102007022	Sanlihe Sanqu Disan	三里河三区第三
110102007024	Nanlishilu	南礼士路
110102007025	Muxidi	木樨地
110102007028	Fuxingmenwai	复兴门外
110102007029	Quanguo Zonggonghui Zhuzhaiqu	全国总工会住宅区
110102007030	Baiyunguan	白云观
110102007032	Zhenwumiao	真武庙
110102007033	Guangdianzongju Zhuzhaiqu Di'er	广电总局住宅区第二
110102007034	Xibianmen	西便门
110102007035	Tiedaobu Zhuzhaiqu Di'er Yi	铁道部住宅区第二、一
110102007037	Guangdianzongju Zhuzhaiqu Diyi	广电总局住宅区第一
110102007038	Qicheju Henan	汽车局河南
110102007039	Qicheju Hebei	汽车局河北
110102007043	Gong'an Zhuzhaiqu	公安住宅区
110102007045	Tiedaobu Zhuzhaiqu Disi	铁道部住宅区第四
110102007048	Sanlihe	三里河

== Landmarks ==
- Temple of the Moon
- White Cloud Temple
- Capital Museum

== See also ==
- List of township-level divisions of Beijing
