= Parasite Bay =

Bay in Antarctica

Parasite Bay (66°46′S 141°33′E) is a small bay between Péage Island and the coastal angle formed by the west side of Cape Découverte. It was charted by the French Antarctic Expedition in 1951 and named by them for the study of atmospheric parasites made there, and by analogy with Ionosphere Bay at the east side of Cape Découverte.
