= Péage Island =

Island in Adélie Land, Antarctica

- Location within Antarctica

Geography
- Location: Antarctica
- Coordinates: 66°46′S 141°32′E

Administration
- Administered under the Antarctic Treaty System

Demographics
- Population: Uninhabited

Péage Island is a small rocky island 0.93 kilometres (0.5 nmi) southwest of Cape Découverte. Charted in 1951 by the French Antarctic Expedition and named by them for its position, which seems to command access to the Curzon Islands for parties arriving from Port Martin, péage being French for toll booth.

== See also ==
- List of Antarctic and sub-Antarctic islands
