= Dru =

Dru, dru, or DRU may refer to:

== People ==
=== Real persons (surname) ===
- Camille Dru (born 1987), French trampolinist
- Joanne Dru (1922–1996), American actress

=== Real persons (forename) ===
- Andrew Dru Castro (born 1976), American Grammy Award-winning recording engineer, producer and songwriter
- Dru DeShields (born 2004), American football player
- Dru Drury (1724–1803), British entomologist
- Dru C. Gladney, American anthropologist
- Dru Sjodin (1981–2003), American murder victim
- Dru Down (born 1973), stage name of American rapper and actor Danyle Robinson (born 1969)
- Dru (singer), Canadian singer-songwriter Andrew Grange
- Dru Samia (born 1997), American football player

=== Fictional characters (forename) ===
- Dru, Gru's twin brother in the 2017 film Despicable Me 3 and the 2024 film Despicable Me 4
- Drusilla 'Dru' Blackthorn, in the 2007+ media franchise The Shadowhunter Chronicles
- Drusilla 'Dru' Sartoris, in Faulkner's 1938 novel The Unvanquished
- Drucilla 'Dru' Winters, in the 1973+ American soap opera The Young and the Restless
- Drusilla, a vampire in the TV series Buffy the Vampire Slayer and Angel

== DRU ==
- Danish Rugby Union, the governing body for rugby union in Denmark
  - DRU Superliga, the highest tier of the national rugby union competition in Denmark
- Design Research Unit, one of the first generation of British design consultancies
- Direct Reporting Unit, an agency of the United States Department of the Air Force

== In geography ==
- Aiguille du Dru, also known as the Dru, a mountain in the French Alps
- DRU Industriepark, a former factory complex in the Netherlands
- Dru Rock, Antarctica, an island

== Other uses ==
- dru, ISO 639-3 code for the Rukai language of Taiwan
- DRU, ICAO designator of the Russian airline ALROSA.

== See also ==
- Drusilla
