= Retour Island =

Island in Adélie Land, Antarctica

Retour Island (66°46′S 141°34′E) is a rocky island 0.7 nautical miles (1.3 km) long, the largest feature in the Curzon Islands, lying 0.1 nautical miles (0.2 km) north of Cape Decouverte. Charted in 1951 by the French Antarctic Expedition and so named by them to commemorate the return of French exploring parties to the vicinity.

== See also ==
- List of Antarctic and sub-Antarctic islands
