= Hui people in Beijing =

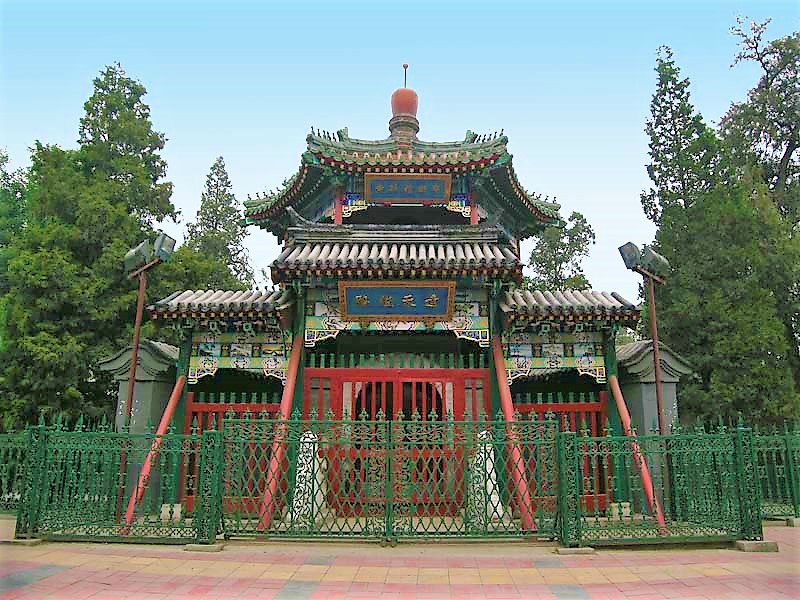
Niujie Mosque in Niujie, Beijing

Beijing has a large community of Hui people, totaling 249,223 people per the 2010 Chinese Census, or 2.35% of the city's total population. As of 2010, the Hui are the second largest minority in the city, behind the Manchu. Neighborhoods with high concentrations of Hui people, such as Niujie, exist throughout the city.

== History ==
The Niujie Mosque was built in the late 10th century and Muslims have been present in Beijing since at least this period.

During the Yuan dynasty, Beijing became a center for Chinese Islam. The Muslim population of the city began increasing soon after the Yuan dynasty was established, with Dadu (in modern Beijing) as their capital. Beijing would quickly become the home of many notable Muslims since that period. The population of Muslims in Beijing was placed at 3,000 households in the 13th century. There was around 35 mosques in Beijing during the Yuan period.

During the early Ming dynasty, individual Muslims in the city were granted political and religious titles by the government. Several more mosques were established in Beijing during the Ming dynasty, many of them bestowed an official name by the Ming emperor. In the Qing dynasty, the city became even more important for Muslims as it was a hub for intellectual and cultural exchanges among Chinese Muslims. The authorities promoted the Muslim community of Beijing as a model to be followed by other Muslims in China.

During the Republican period, the Muslims of Beijing survived the political turmoil by promoting Islamic education and culture along with patriotism for their country. Since 1949, Beijing has served as the center for the Chinese Islamic Association and the Chinese Islamic Institute which helps organize the Muslim community of Beijing and China.

== Demographics ==
The 1982 census stated that 184,693 people in Beijing were Hui, making up around 2% of Beijing's total population and 57% of the population classified as ethnic minority. Village and Family in Contemporary China, a 1980 study by William L. Parish and Martin K. Whyte, stated that there were 16,000 Muslims in Beijing. Dru C. Gladney, author of Muslim Chinese: Ethnic Nationalism in the People's Republic, wrote that based on the 1982 census, the 1980 study had "drastically" underestimated the number of Hui in Beijing.

== Geography ==
As of 1996 there was no published data based on the 1982 census which maps the distributions of Hui people in the city. The Niujie ("Oxen Street") community, as of 1996, has the city's highest Hui concentration. As of 1996 other communities which have concentrations of Hui include Madian, Chaonei, Chaowai, Chongwai, Haidian, Sanlihe, and Huashi.

By 2002, Niujie had survived the massive development in Beijing since it was located away from the northern end of Beijing. By that year Madian's Hui population eroded due to redevelopment.

== Economy ==
Dru C. Gladney stated that Islamic restaurants are often indicators of where Hui in Beijing live. As of 1996 within Beijing the Hui had operated hundreds of Islamic restaurants.

== Religion ==
As of 2017 there were about 70 mosques in Beijing. Gladney wrote that the Niujie Mosque in Niujie serves hundreds of Hui families, and typically the presence of one Hui mosque would indicate that 500 Hui individuals or 100 Hui families live in the vicinity.

== See also ==
- Demographics of Beijing
- Uyghurs in Beijing
- Minzu University of China
