= Niujie =

Niujie Subdistrict 牛街街道
- Subdistrict
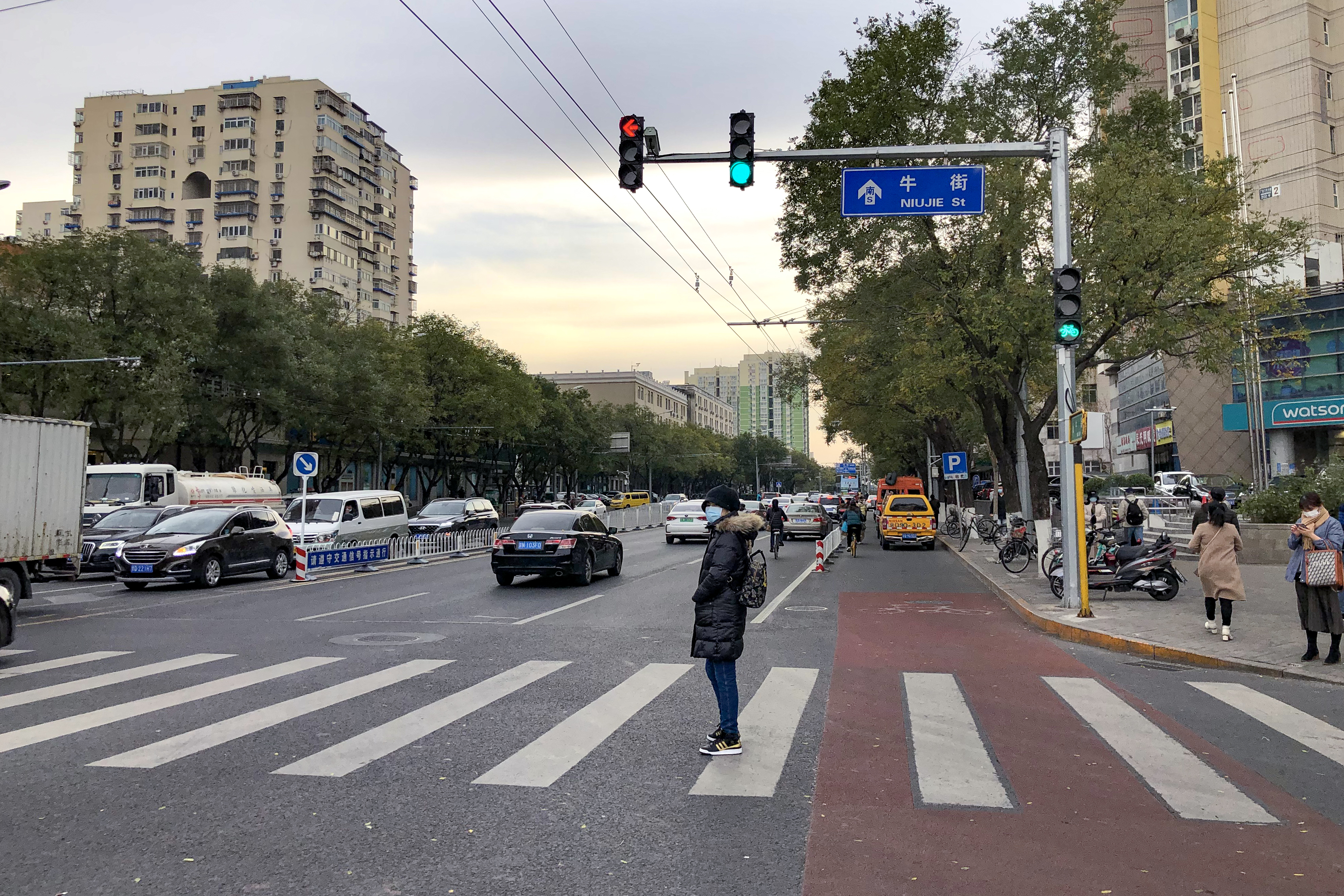
- North start of Niujie in 2020

- Location within Beijing Location within China
- Coordinates: 39°53′11″N 116°21′48″E
- Country: China
- Municipality: Beijing
- District: Xicheng

Area
  - Total: 1.44 km^{2} (0.56 sq mi)

Population (2020)
  - Total: 51,410
  - Density: 35,700/km^{2} (92,500/sq mi)
- Time zone: UTC+8 (China Standard)
- Postal code: 100053
- Area code: 010

Niujie (Chinese: 牛街; pinyin: Niú jiē; Wade–Giles: Niu-chieh; lit. 'Oxen Street') is a subdistrict in Xicheng District in southwest Beijing, China. The name "Niujie" can refer to the street Niujie or to the neighborhood Niujie. The subdistrict was previously in Xuanwu District before the district was merged into Xicheng District in 2010. As of 2020, its total population is 51,410.

The Niujie Subdistrict is administered by the Niujie Subdistrict Administrative Office. The core area of this district is along the street Niujie. The Niujie core area, a Hui people neighborhood, has Beijing's largest concentration of Muslim people. As of 2013 there is a Muslim-oriented hospital as well as social services, cafés, shops, restaurants, and schools catering to the Muslim population. In 2002 Wenfei Wang, Shangyi Zhou, and C. Cindy Fan, authors of "Growth and Decline of Muslim Hui Enclaves in Beijing," wrote that Niujie "continues to thrive as a major residential area of the Hui people in Beijing and as a prominent supplier of Hui foods and services for the entire city." The neighborhood has the Niujie Mosque, which according to Wenfei Wang, Shangyi Zhou, and Cindy Fan, "mark[s] the identity of Niujie" and has an element of centrality in the community. Most larger Hui neighborhoods in Beijing have their own mosques.

== History ==
At up to the Tang dynasty, what is now Niujie would have been on the city's periphery according to archival research and historical documents. The Niujie Mosque was built between 916 and 1125. Wenfei Wang, Shangyi Zhou, and Cindy Fan stated that the establishment of the Hui settlement "probably" was related to Muslims joining the army of Genghis Khan, who had conquered Beijing, and that based on some gravestones of imams encountered at the Niujie Mosque, a significant community of Hui people had lived in the Niujie area dating back to the Yuan dynasty. During that dynasty many Muslims moved to Beijing. Therefore, soldiers were the first Hui people in Niujie.

During the Yuan dynasty Niujie was located in proximity to and outside of the main Beijing city wall, and it had the name Willow River Village. Dru C. Gladney, author of Muslim Chinese: Ethnic Nationalism in the People's Republic, wrote that according to stories from that dynasty, Han people rarely walked in the neighborhood alone. In addition, the stories state that during the dynasty, 2,953 households resided on Niujie. Wenfei Wang, Shangyi Zhou, and Cindy Fan wrote that "peripheral location reflected separation between the Hui people living there and the Mongolian residents living within the city wall." In 1544 an outer city wall was established and Willow River Village was within this outer city wall. Wenfei Wang, Shangyi Zhou, and Cindy Fan wrote that the community "was still considered peripheral to the city proper where most Han Chinese lived."

According to the China Internet Information Center, a legend stated that the street Niujie was originally named "Pomegranate Street" or Liujie (Chinese: 榴街; pinyin: liú jiē; Wade–Giles: Liu-chieh) because the Muslims in the community grew pomegranate trees. Wenfei Wang, Shangyi Zhou, and Cindy Fan stated the Liu meant "willow" (C: 柳, P: Liǔ, W: Liu) and that the similarity between liu and niu "might have given rise to the name change." Gladney wrote that the name may have originated from a concentration of beef butchers during the Qing dynasty or from the homophonic similarity to the Liu River, where pomegranate and willow trees grew. The name change of the community to Niujie occurred during the Qing dynasty. The China Internet Information Center stated that the street name changed when members of the community began specializing in beef. At that time, imams had butchered both mutton and beef.

Wenfei Wang, Shangyi Zhou, and Cindy Fan stated that the Niujie Hui community continued to be distinct from the Manchu community in Beijing during the Qing dynasty.

In the late 1990s the neighborhood underwent a renovation and the majority of the 3,000 families living there relocated on a temporary basis as the renovations occurred. The renovations of a 36-hectare (89-acre) area in the district began in 1997, 26,000 residents in about 7,500 households were affected by the renovations. The completion of the first phase occurred by the end of 2000. New apartment buildings had been constructed, and a government policy stated that displaced residents of Niujie only needed to pay a small price in order to move into the new buildings. At the end of phase one, 3,000 people moved into the new apartment buildings. The majority of residents who decided not to return were Han Chinese. Overall the non-Muslims had a tendency to remain out of the neighborhood. Almost all of the Muslim families returned after renovations ended. Overall 90% of the displaced families from the first phase of the renovation had returned.

In 2002, Wenfei Wang, Shangyi Zhou, and Cindy Fan wrote that Niujie "continues to be a thriving enclave, with a high concentration of Hui residents and economic activities". The second stage of the renovation was scheduled to be completed that year.

== Administrative Division ==
By 2021, there are a total of 10 communities within the subdistrict:

Administrative Division Code	Community Name (English)	Community Name (Chinese)
110102018001	Niujie Dongli	牛街东里
110102018002	Chunfeng	春风
110102018003	Gangyuan	钢院
110102018004	Nanxiange	南线阁
110102018005	Caiyuan Beili	菜园北里
110102018006	Fenghua	枫桦
110102018007	Fayuansi	法源寺
110102018008	Baiguanglu	白广路
110102018009	Niujie Xili Yiqu	牛街西里一区
110102018010	Niujie Xili Erqu	牛街西里二区

== Demographics ==
Niujie district had 64,059 residents, 21.9% of them being Hui, in 2000. As of 2000 24,088 people lived in the Niujie core area, 54.1% being Hui. This gives it a higher percentage of Hui population than other areas of the district. The core area is one of Beijing's largest ethnic enclaves.

As of 1996 the district had 55,722 residents, with 13,755, or 24.7% of the total population, being ethnic minorities. Of the minorities, 13,307, or 96.6%, were Hui. In the core area itself, there were 2,446 residents and 649 households resident. Of the individuals, 1,763 were Hui, making up 70.2% of the population. Of the households 475 were Hui, making up 69.3%, and the Manchu and Mongolian ethnic groups each had two households.

In the neighborhoods on both sides of the core area, as of 1996 about 50% of the residents were Han and 50% were Hui. In the Tang Fang neighborhood in the Niujie District, as of the 1982 census, there were 3,107 individuals. Of them, there were 1,814 Hui, making up 58.38% of the population, 1,272 Han, making up 40.94% of the population, and 21 Manchu, making up .68% of the population. As of 1996 the communities closer to the core area have higher Hui populations than those further from the core area.

As of 2007, according to Nimrod Baranovich, author of "Inverted Exile: Uyghur Writers and Artists in Beijing and the Political Implications of Their Work," he had been informed that many Uyghur people live in Niujie.

== Cityscape ==
As of 2011 the Niujie core area features various buildings decorated in an Islamic Chinese style, including the post office and apartment blocks. The apartments were painted in the Islamic-associated colors white and green and decorated with Islamic symbols. The core area includes a Hui primary school, a supermarket carrying halal products, and several Muslim restaurants. As of 1996 there were 51 Islamic meatshops, 51 Islamic restaurants, and several Islamic foodstuff stores in all of Xuanwu district. On Niujie Street at that time there were Hui getihu who sold fruit and pastries, 8 Islamic noodle and pastry shops, and 2 small Islamic restaurants.

The Chinese Islamic Association building, located southeast of the Mosque, has Arab architectural flourishes such as parapets and large green domes. It was built in the 1950s. The Huimin Yiyuan (S: 回民医院, P: Huímín Yīyuàn), the Hui hospital, is at the south end of the Niujie street.

The Tang Fang neighborhood is west of Niujie Street on Beiruilu.

== Government and infrastructure ==
The Niujie Street Administrative Office governs the area in the community. In 2002 Wenfei Wang, Shangyi Zhou, and Cindy Fan concluded that based on the re-development plans stating that the Niujie Mosque would remain in its current location with its "centrality" in the community, the administrative office "has played an important role in preserving the Hui character of the enclave, making it possible for the Hui residents to return and live in a setting they are highly identified with, despite urban renovation and redevelopment."

== Economy ==
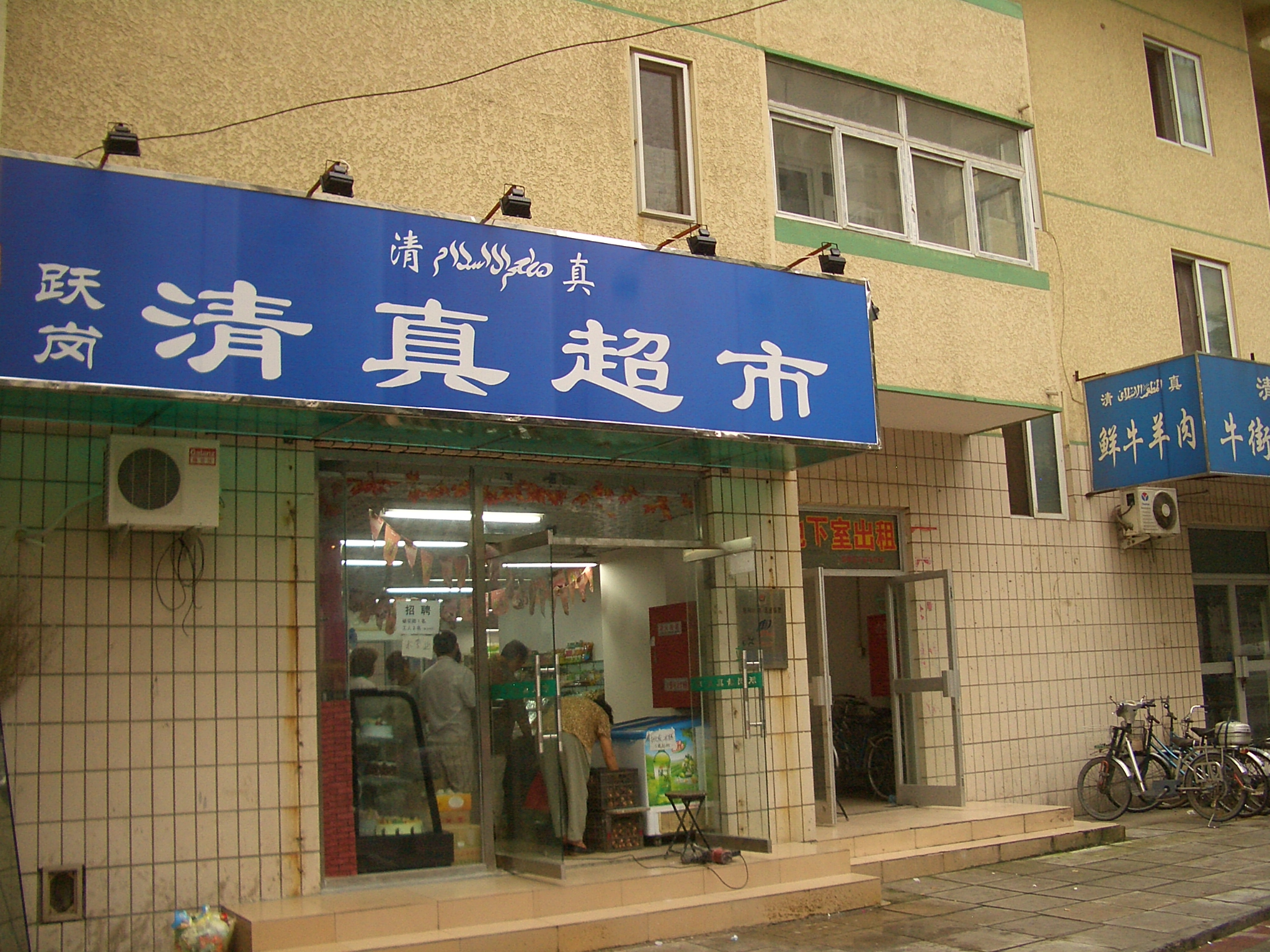
A halal supermarket in Niujie

Wenfei Wang, Shangyi Zhou, and Cindy Fan explained that the economy of the community is focused on "ethnic-specific activities" such as Jade processing, meat trading, and Islamic restaurants. Tourism, including visits to the Niujie Mosque, is a part of the economy of Niujie. A survey conducted by Wenfei Wang, Shangyi Zhou, and Cindy Fan in January 2002 concluded that the market and shops on Nanhengxi Street sold about 6,000 kilograms (13,000 lb) of beef and mutton daily. The same survey counted over 30 Islamic restaurants on Nanhengxi Street. In addition, around 2002, there had been an increase in contractors, miscellaneous repair shops, and other services.

Wenfei Wang, Shangyi Zhou, and Cindy Fan wrote that Niujie has remained to be an ethnic enclave because it continued to be "peripheral to the city’s core area of economic growth" with much of the expansion occurring in north Beijing instead of the portion of Beijing where Niujie resides. In an interview in August 2000 the head of a resident committee in the Madian neighborhood in Haidian District, which historically was a Hui community but faced a decline due to development, stated that even though going to Niujie from Madian meant a lengthy commute, many Madian Hui now preferred to travel there to purchase beef and mutton. Wenfei Wang, Shangyi Zhou, and Cindy Fan wrote that "This is evidence that Niujie’s role as a large enclave and major supplier for the Hui people in Beijing has been enhanced as the ethnic economy of Madian gradually declined."

Wenfei Wang, Shangyi Zhou, and Cindy Fan wrote that Niujie served in a wider ethnic Hui economy across Beijing as well as providing a local ethnic enclave economy in the period from the Ming dynasty until 1949. In the pre-1949 period 75% of the jade trade enterprises in the city were located in Niujie. Wenfei Wang, Shangyi Zhou, and Cindy Fan wrote that in this period a central component of Niujie was the food service sector, which consisted of beef and button stands, Hui food wagons and stands, and Hui restaurants. They stated that residents of Niujie "gained a reputation for operating meat delicatessens in other parts of Beijing." Niujie was also adjacent to a major vegetable market, Caishikou.

== Education ==
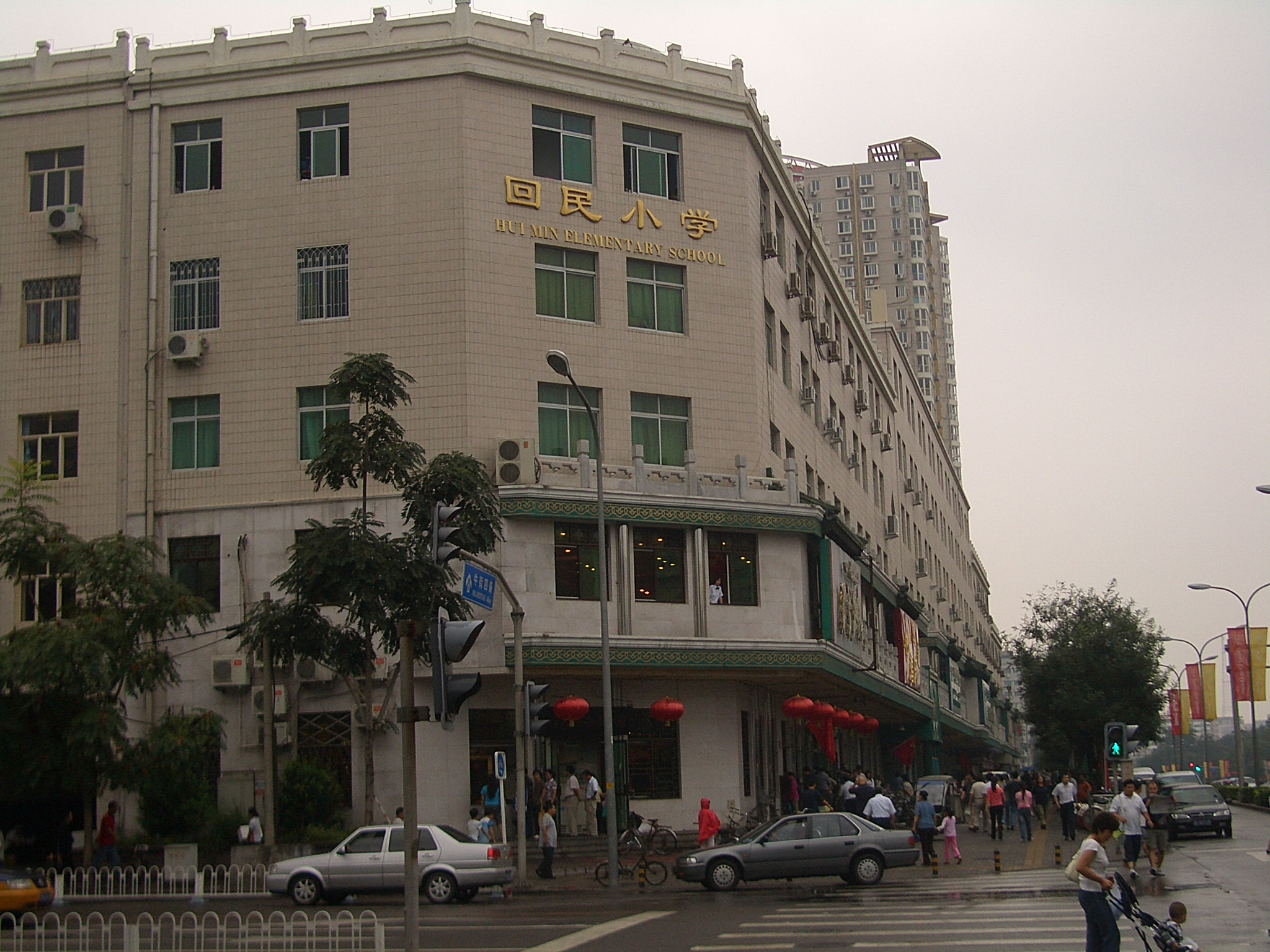
Huimin Elementary School in 2008

One school in Niujie, the Beijing Xuanwu Huimin Elementary School (Chinese: 北京市宣武回民小学; pinyin: Běijīng Shì Xuānwǔ Huímín Xiǎoxué; lit. 'Beijing Xuanwu Hui People Elementary School'), serves the Hui people living in the area.

== See also ==
- Hui people in Beijing
- Niujie station, on Beijing Subway Line 19
- List of township-level divisions of Beijing
