= Claquebue Island =

Island in Adélie Land, Antarctica

- Location within Antarctica

Geography
- Location: Antarctica
- Coordinates: 66°46′S 141°35′E
- Length: 0.5 km (0.31 mi)

Administration
- Administered under the Antarctic Treaty System

Demographics
- Population: Uninhabited

Claquebue Island is a rocky island 0.5 kilometres (0.25 nmi) long, lying 0.1 kilometres (0.05 nmi) east of Dru Rock in the Curzon Islands. It was charted in 1951 by the French Antarctic Expedition and named by them, for the village in La Jument Verte, a novel much read and appreciated by members of the French expedition.

== See also ==
- List of Antarctic and sub-Antarctic islands
