= Dru Rock =

Island in Adélie Land, Antarctica

- Location within Antarctica

Geography
- Location: Antarctica
- Coordinates: 66°46′S 141°35′E
- Archipelago: Curzon Islands
- Length: 0.28 km (0.174 mi)

Administration
- Administered under the Antarctic Treaty System

Demographics
- Population: Uninhabited

Dru Rock is a rocky island 0.28 kilometres (0.15 nmi) long between Retour Island and Claquebue Island in the Curzon Islands. The island is home to many craggy rock faces, which make climbing difficult.

== Charting ==
It was initially charted in 1951 by the French Antarctic Expedition. The island was named by them "Rocher des Drus" or "Dru Rock" in memory of their scaling of the needle-shaped peaks of Chamonix, France. "Dru" meant "strong" or "hot" in local French, and the island was charted on an unusually warm day. The Advisory Committee on Antarctic Names transferred the French name to English in 1962.
