= Madian, Beijing =

Neighbourhood of Beijing, China

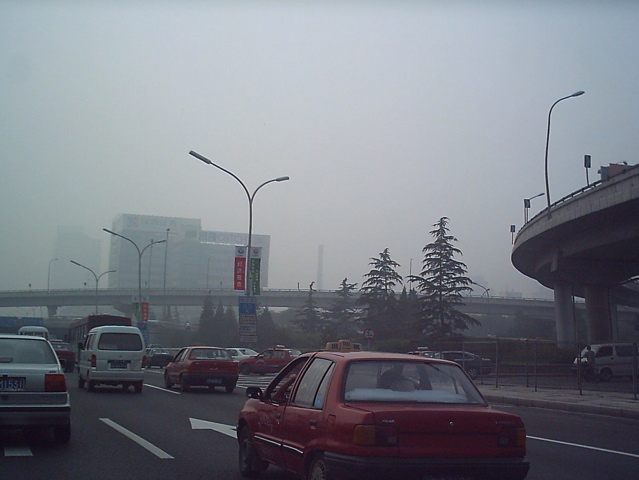
Madian node and bridge

Madian (simplified Chinese: 马甸; traditional Chinese: 馬甸; pinyin: Mǎdiàn; Wade–Giles: Ma-tian "Caravansary" or "Horse Pasture") is a community in Haidian District, Beijing, China. It is adjacent to the intersection of the 3rd Ring Road and the Jingzang Expressway (formerly Badaling Expressway), at the Haidian District-Xicheng District border. Two separate subdistrict offices serve portions of Madian.

A complex overpass links the northern segment of the 3rd Ring Road with an express route coming from Deshengmen on the 2nd Ring Road through to the Jingzang Expressway. Madian historically had a Hui population, and the 3,000-square-metre (32,000 sq ft) Madian Mosque is located in the community.

Madian Bridge has been expanded twice to create two direct links to the expressway. A few years ago, the route to Deshengmen was expanded and is now a city express route.

== History ==
Wenfei Wang, Shangyi Zhou, and C. Cindy Fan, authors of "Growth and Decline of Muslim Hui Enclaves in Beijing," wrote that Madian historically was in a "relatively peripheral part of the city" and in particular "peripheral to the core areas of the city". During the Yuan dynasty Madian was within the Beijing city wall. After the wall was rebuilt during the Ming dynasty, Madian was outside of the city wall.

Wenfei Wang, Shangyi Zhou, and Cindy Fan stated that according to historical records the first Hui arrived in Madian during the reign of the Kangxi Emperor of the Qing dynasty. Turmoil in northwestern China during the Qing dynasty caused many Hui to move eastward. A population of Hui, mostly horse and sheep traders, settled in Madian due to its access to horse and sheep trading routes. Therefore, a large trading market in horses and sheep was established there. Wenfei Wang, Shangyi Zhou, and Cindy Fan argued that the name Madian may have originated from the horse trading that occurred there and argued that this "may also be related to" the prevalence of the Ma family name in Madian. Kangxi built the Madian Mosque in 1662. Wenfei Wang, Shangyi Zhou, and Cindy Fan had interviewed an administrator of the mosque, who stated that the mosque "probably" opened due to a pre-existing Hui population.

Around the 1930s, traders of pigs and pork detoured around Madian because it was homogeneously Muslim. The head of a resident committee interviewed by Wenfei Wang, Shangyi Zhou, and Cindy Fan in August 2000 stated that Madian was over 90% Muslim in the 1950s. In the late 1950s, the community received an influx of people displaced by the construction of the Great Hall of the People.

In the initial years after the founding of the People's Republic in 1949 new housing developments appeared in Madian. Due to its location accessible to other areas, Madian was selected as a place for the development of new housing. Apartments were built in the place of the slaughterhouse and sheep market after those facilities were demolished. Han people moved into the apartments, causing the percentage of Hui people to decrease. Weiping Wu and Piper Gaubatz, authors of The Chinese City, wrote that the result was that "lost much of its Muslim character". The resident head stated that in the 1980s fewer than 30% of the people in Madian were Muslim. In 1996 Dru C. Gladney, author of Muslim Chinese: Ethnic Nationalism in the People's Republic, wrote that "recent studies indicate that the [Hui] community continues to maintain a strong solidarity."

In the decades before 2002 the expansion of highways and roads further changed the character of Madian. Many Hui left Madian when the Dechang Road was constructed in the 1980s. This road later became a part of the Badaling Expressway. In the 1990s developers started renovation projects in Madian because of its location along the 3rd Ring Road. In 1993 the renovation of the Yulanyuan had been completed. The central buildings are three story residential buildings that do not reflect the Islamic culture. Prior to the renovation the area had been named Nancun or Southern Village (C: 南村, P: Náncūn). More Hui left the neighborhood during the construction of the 3rd Ring Road in the 1990s. After the renovation of Yulanyuan, 40% of the original residents returned. In other parts of Madian, the rates of return from former residents were lower. Ultimately most of the displaced Hui Madian residents settled in more inexpensive areas further from the Beijing city core, in the northern and northwestern parts of Beijing.

Wenfei Wang, Shangyi Zhou, and Cindy Fan stated that post-renovation Madian was "relatively expensive". In 2000, many former residents of Madian would have been unable to move back there or have been required to buy a smaller living area if they wanted to move back as the purchase price of a new apartment was above 10,000 yuan per square meter. The resident head stated that in 2000 Madian was about 25% Muslim. In 2002 Wenfei Wang, Shangyi Zhou, and Cindy Fan stated that "Madian has lost much of its character as a Hui enclave in terms of both residential and economic functions." The three authors added that Gladney's conclusions about the solidarity of the community were "quickly outdated."

As of 2002 the development plans state that a multifunctional building named "CityChamp Palace" would be the centerpiece of Madian.

== Demographics ==
In 1982 there were 2,266 Han individuals in 660 households, 922 Hui individuals in 282 households, and 65 Manchu individuals in 30 households. The district was 28.6% Hui. 7.8% of the Han individuals have intermarried with Hui or Manchu, 11.2% of the Hui individuals have intermarried with Han or Manchu, and 80% of the Manchu individuals have intermarried with Han or Hui.

== Government and infrastructure ==
In 2002 Wenfei Wang, Shangyi Zhou, and Cindy Fan argued that the fact that Madian is divided between two administrative offices instead of being under one has "undermined" the Hui community and therefore, unlike the Niujie area in Xicheng District, the city government was less willing to preserve the Hui community in Madian due to developmental pressures.

== Economy ==
As of 2002 the community had several Hui groceries, three or four beef and mutton shops, and eight small Hui restaurants. Wenfei Wang, Shangyi Zhou, and Cindy Fan wrote that it is "likely" that "most of these businesses will disappear" as the renovation project of Madian continues its course. In addition, in an interview in August 2000 the head of a Madian resident committee stated that even though going to Niujie from Madian meant a lengthy commute, many Madian Hui preferred to travel there to purchase beef and mutton. The three authors wrote that the decline of the Hui population in Madian furthers the decline of the Hui economy there, and vice versa in a repeating process.

Wenfei Wang, Shangyi Zhou, and Cindy Fan wrote that "Historically, the Hui people in Madian were highly concentrated in businesses linked to the sheep market and were less proficient in other economic activities." During the reign of the Daoguang Emperor, the district sold a total of 130,000 head of animals in one year. The central street of Madian had 13 animal shops with a combined annual sale of 30,000 head of animals. Up until the 1950s a slaughterhouse in Madian was the primary source of mutton and beef of the Hui population of Beijing. The introduction of locomotives damaged the economy of Madian, since it caused the end of the caravan trade. During the late Republican period a heavy taxation was imposed, further damaging the economy. As a result, the Madian economy diversified. By the 1930s annual sales of sheep within Madian were between 30,000 and 50,000. The sheep market was demolished in the early part of the People's Republic, prior to the reform and opening up. As the Hui population declined, the Hui business activity declined.

== Education ==
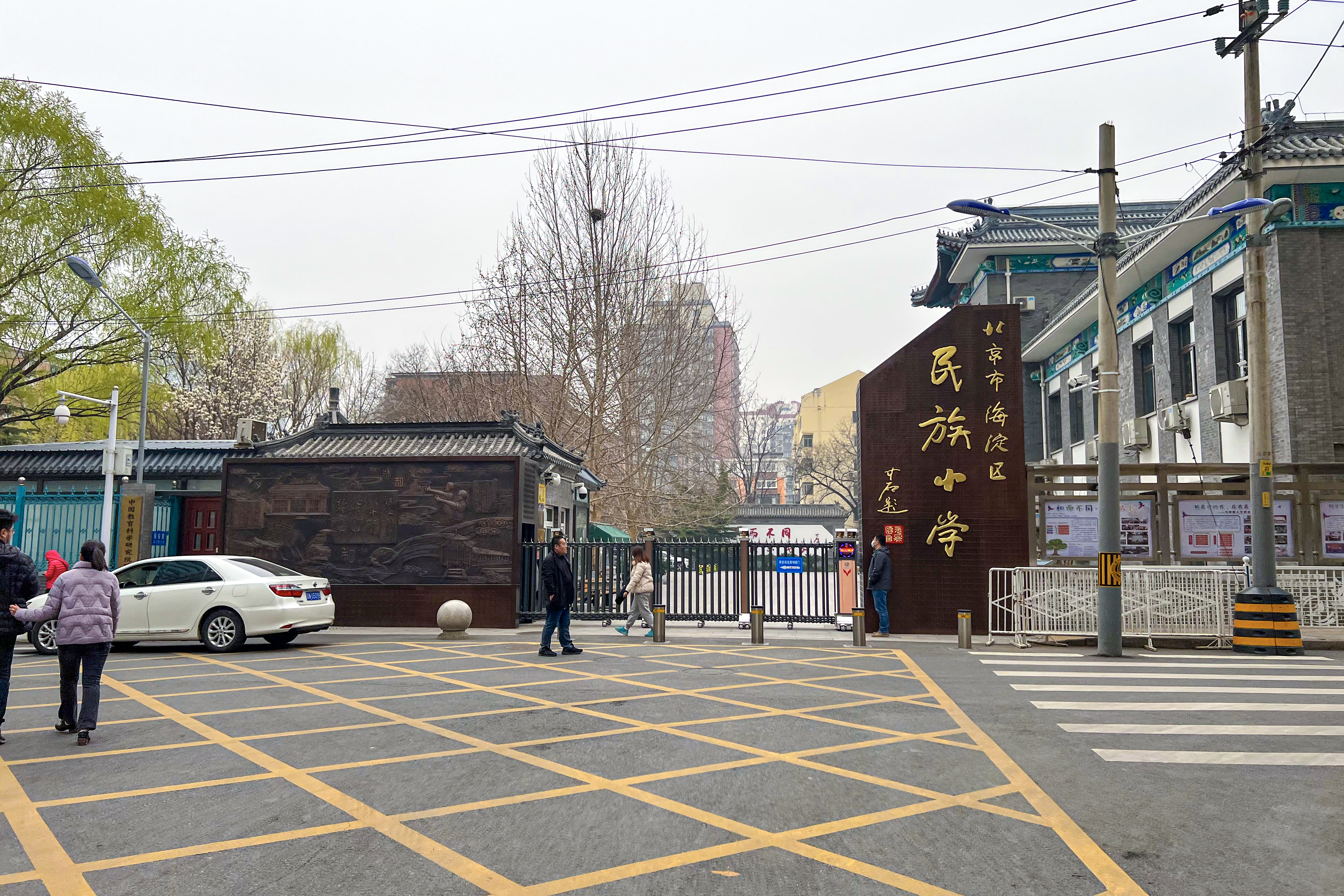
Beijing Haidian Minzu Primary School

The Beijing Haidian Minzu Primary School (S: 北京市海淀区民族小学, P: Běijīng Shì Hǎidiànqū Mínzú Xiǎoxué, "Beijing Haidian Ethnic Group Primary School") serves ethnic minorities in the Madian area. It was previously named Madian Primary School (S: 马甸小学, P: Mǎdiàn Xiǎoxué).

== See also ==
- Hui people in Beijing
