= Xuanwu District =

Xuanwu District may refer to:

- Xuanwu District, Beijing (宣武区), former district that was merged into Xicheng District
- Xuanwu District, Nanjing (玄武区), Jiangsu
