= Français Glacier Tongue =

Glacier tongue in Antarctica

Français Glacier Tongue (66°31′S 138°15′E) is a broad glacier tongue about 3 nautical miles (6 km) long extending seaward from Français Glacier. It was charted in 1951 by the French Antarctic Expedition and named by them for the Français, expedition ship of the French Antarctic Expedition, 1903–05, under Jean-Baptiste Charcot.
