= Niujie Mosque =

Mosque in Xicheng, Beijing, China

- 牛街清真寺; Niú Jiē Qīng Zhēn Sì مسجد نيوجيه
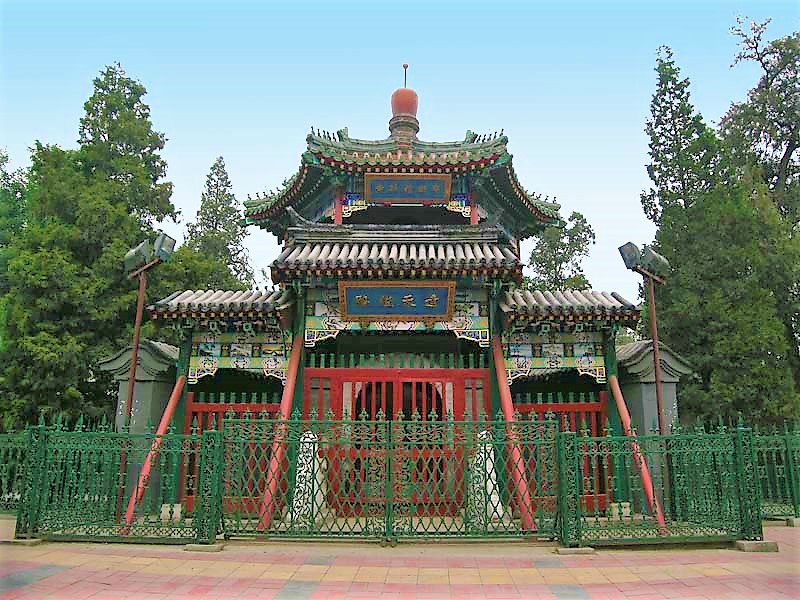

- Location of the mosque in Beijing

Religion
- Affiliation: Sunni Islam
- Ecclesiastical or organisational status: Mosque
- Status: Active

Location
- Location: Niujie, Xicheng, Beijing
- Country: China
- Interactive map of Niujie Mosque
- Coordinates: 39°53′04″N 116°21′29″E

Architecture
- Architect: Nazaruddin
- Type: Mosque
- Style: Chinese
- Completed: 996 CE (original); 1443 CE (rebuild); 1696 CE (current)
- Destroyed: 1215 CE (by Genghis Khan)

Specifications
- Capacity: 1,000 worshipers
- Interior area: 600 m^{2} (6,500 sq ft)
- Site area: 10,000 m^{2} (110,000 sq ft)
- Materials: Timber

Major cultural heritage sites under national-level protection
- Official name: Niujie Mosque 牛街礼拜寺
- Type: Cultural
- Criteria: Religion
- Reference no.: 3-134

The Niujie Mosque (simplified Chinese: 牛街礼拜寺; traditional Chinese: 牛街禮拜寺; pinyin: Niú Jiē Lǐ Bài Sì; Wade–Giles: Niu-chieh Li-pai-ssu), also known as the Oxen Street House of Worship (Chinese: 牛街清真寺; pinyin: Niú Jiē Qīng Zhēn Sì; Wade–Giles: Niu-chieh Ch'ing-chen-ssu), or the Oxen Street Mosque, is the oldest mosque in Beijing, China.

It was built in 996 CE during the Liao dynasty, destroyed during the Mongol conquest of China, was rebuilt during the 15th century, and was reconstructed and enlarged during the 17th century, under the Kangxi Emperor (r. 1661–1722) of the Qing dynasty. The mosque is listed as a Chinese major cultural heritage site.

The mosque is located in the Niujie area of Beijing's Xicheng District, the spiritual centre for the almost 10,000 Muslims living in the vicinity and it is the biggest and oldest one in Beijing. It was within the Xuanwu District before it merged into Xicheng in 2010. Niujie in Xicheng District, where the mosque is located, is the largest and biggest area inhabited by Muslims in Beijing.

The Niujie Mosque covers an area of approximately 10,000 square metres (110,000 sq ft). The mosque reflects a mixture of Islamic and Han Chinese cultural and architectural influences. From the outside, its architecture shows traditional Chinese influence and the inside has a blend of Islamic calligraphy and Chinese design. The main prayer hall is 600 square metres (6,500 sq ft) in area, and can hold more than 1,000 worshipers. The mosque, built out of timber, is home to some important cultural relics and tablets such as the upright tablet of an emperor's decree proclaimed in 1694 during the Qing dynasty.

== History ==
The Niujie Mosque, the largest of all the mosques in Beijing, was first built in 996 during the Liao dynasty (r. 916–1125). The local Muslim community constructed the mosque using traditional Chinese architecture, with the exception that it displays Arabic calligraphy in the interior. It was originally designed by Nazaruddin, the son of an imam. After it was destroyed by armies of Genghis Khan in 1215, the mosque was rebuilt in 1443 in the Ming dynasty; and Muslim eunuchs contributed funds in 1496 to repair the mosque.

It was significantly expanded in 1696 under the Qing dynasty. During the Qing dynasty, the neighbouring markets were known for Halal beef and mutton, even until today, the presence is still quite strong with Muslim grocery stores with Arabic signage along the road. The actual name of the mosque is Lǐbàisì, which was given by the Chenghua Emperor in 1474, but since it is located in Oxen Street (Niú means Oxen and jiē means street) the mosque is simply called Niujie. It is one of the major mosques in north China.

The mosque has undergone three renovations since the founding of the People's Republic of China in 1949, respectively in 1955, 1979 and 1996.

As of 2002, the master plan of the renovation of Niujie stated that the mosque will remain at its current location and that a grassy area and large square would be developed around the mosque.

== Architecture ==
The mosque consists of a group of buildings which follow the norms of traditional Chinese architecture. It has two courtyard according to the Siheyuan layout. Facilities include a worship hall, the Wangyue Building, Building for Publicising Etiquette, a lecture hall, the Tablet Pavilion, the Twin Pavilions, and bathrooms. The mosque is home to an ancient Quran over 300 years old, tombs of Arabian sages, and an incense burner dating from the Ming dynasty. The mosque also houses a library with ancient manuscripts. The prayer hall was applied the cruciform plan.

== Tourism and official visits ==
The Government of the People's Republic of China often uses the Niujie Mosque as a visiting site for delegations coming from Islamic countries. Han Chinese and Hui tourists and Muslims from outside of China visit the Niujie Mosque for tourism reasons.

While non-Muslims are not allowed to enter the prayer hall, people working at the mosque are quite friendly to all visitors and happy to talk about their beliefs with those who can speak Chinese. Visitors to the mosque may also be interested in the China Islamic Institute, which is just southeast, at the corner of Nanheng W. Road and Jiaozi Hutong.

== Transportation ==
The mosque is accessible within walking distance south west of Caishikou Station of Beijing Subway.

== Gallery ==
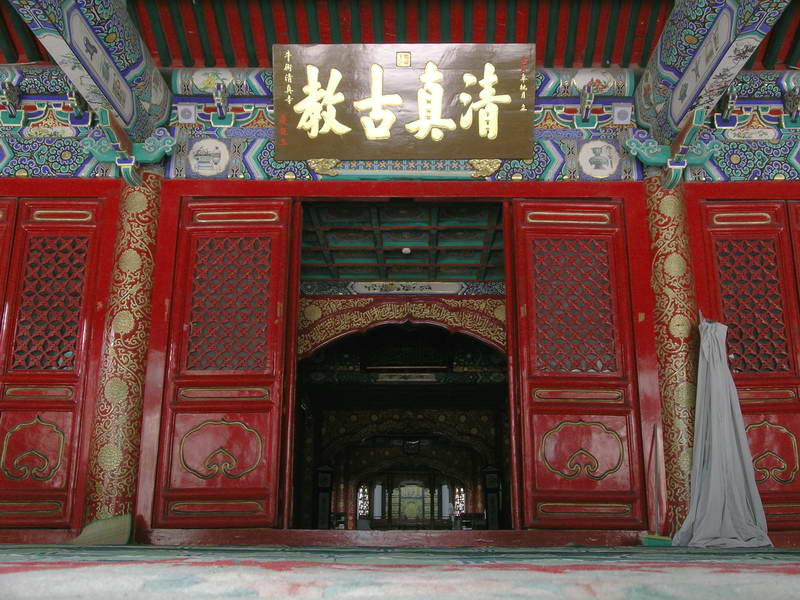
Main hall

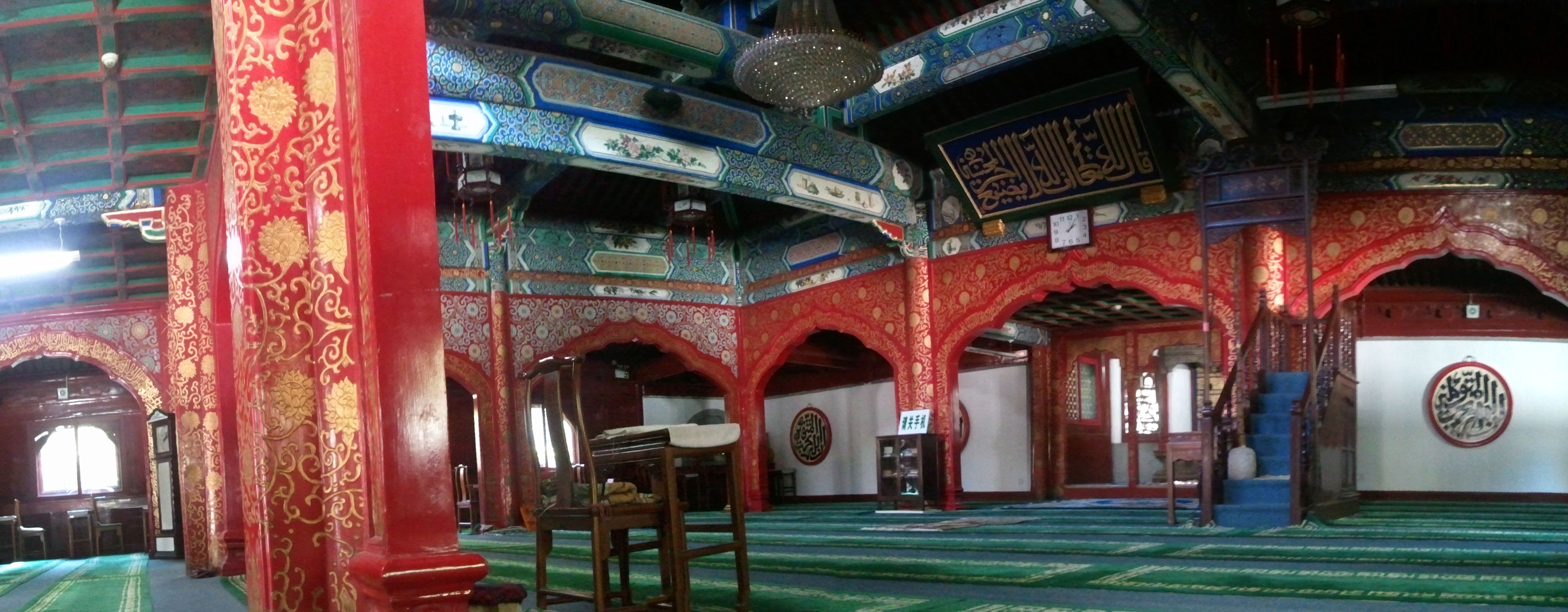
Main prayer hall

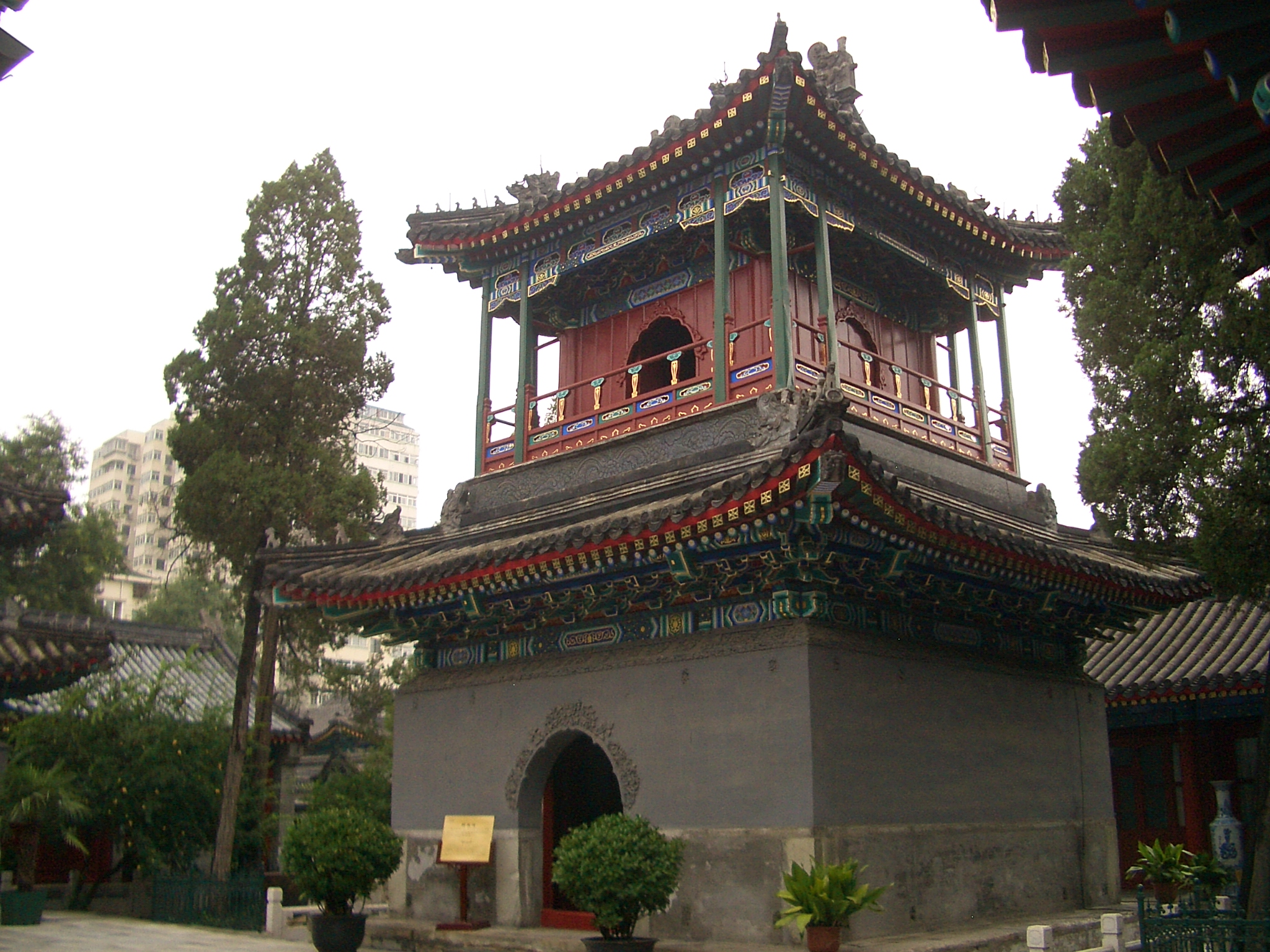
The minaret

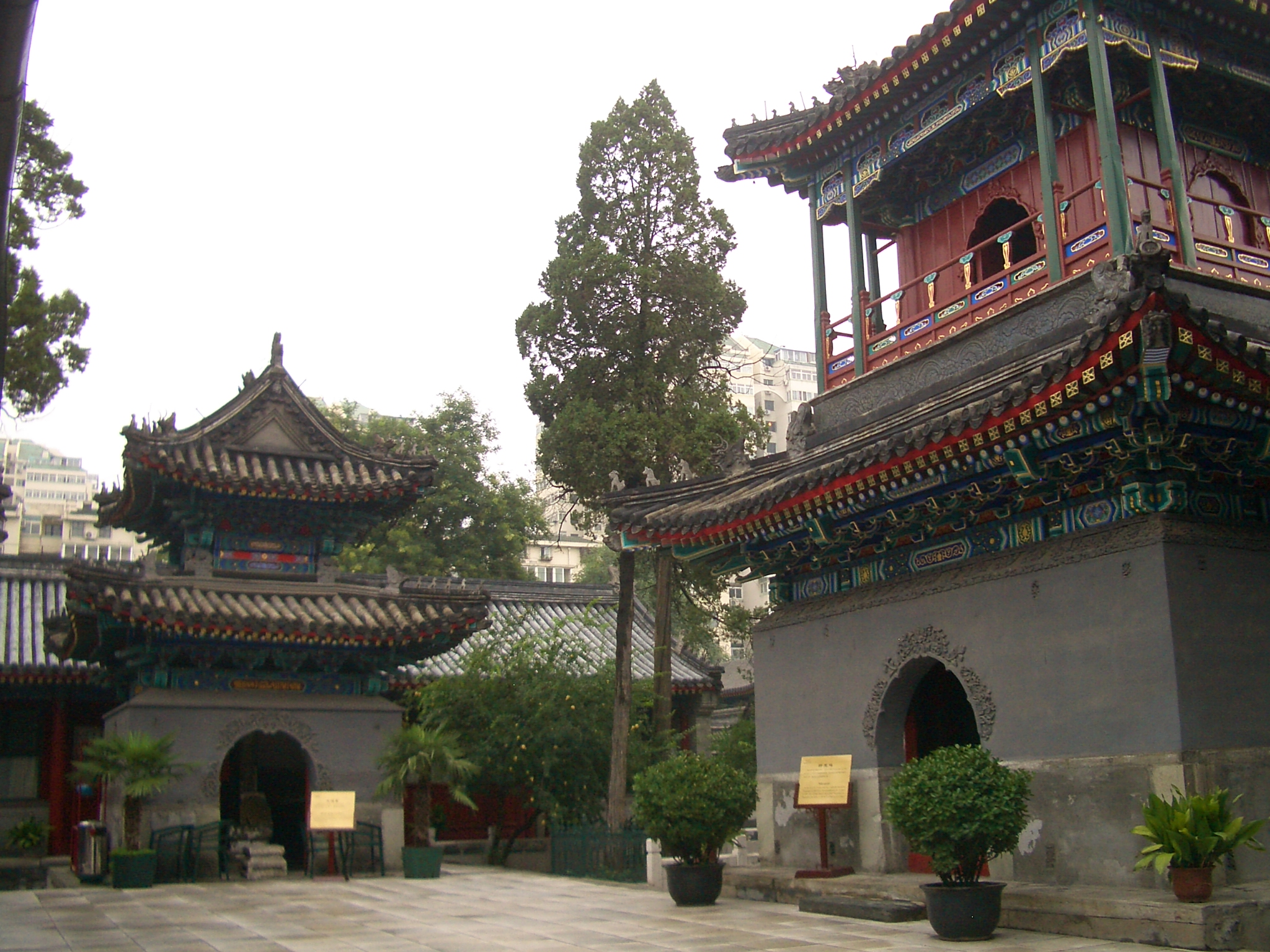
The sahn

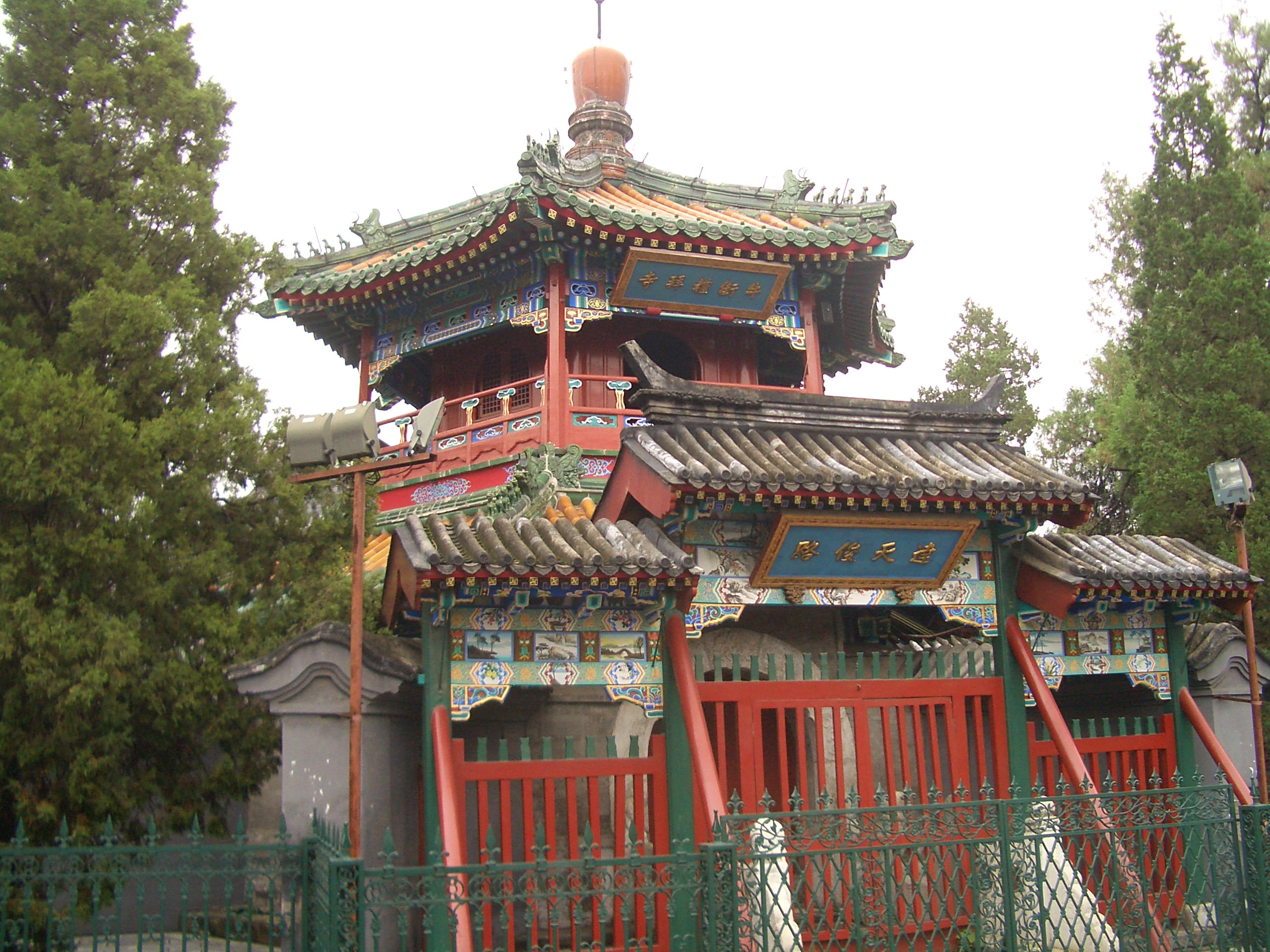
The Moon Tower

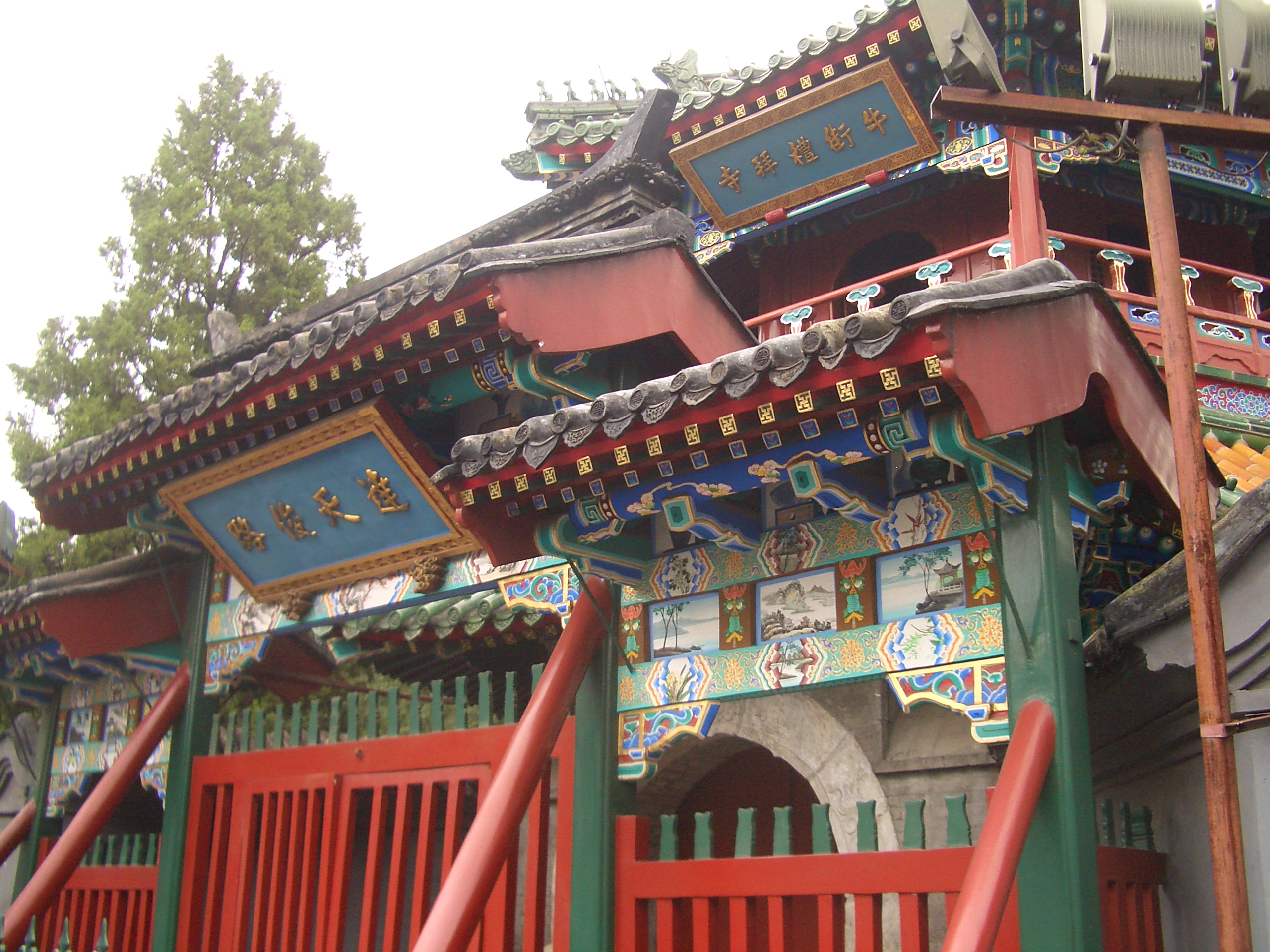
Main entrance

== See also ==
- Islam in China
- List of mosques in China
- List of Major National Historical and Cultural Sites in Beijing
