= Madian Mosque =

Mosque in Haidian, Beijing, China

- 马甸清真寺
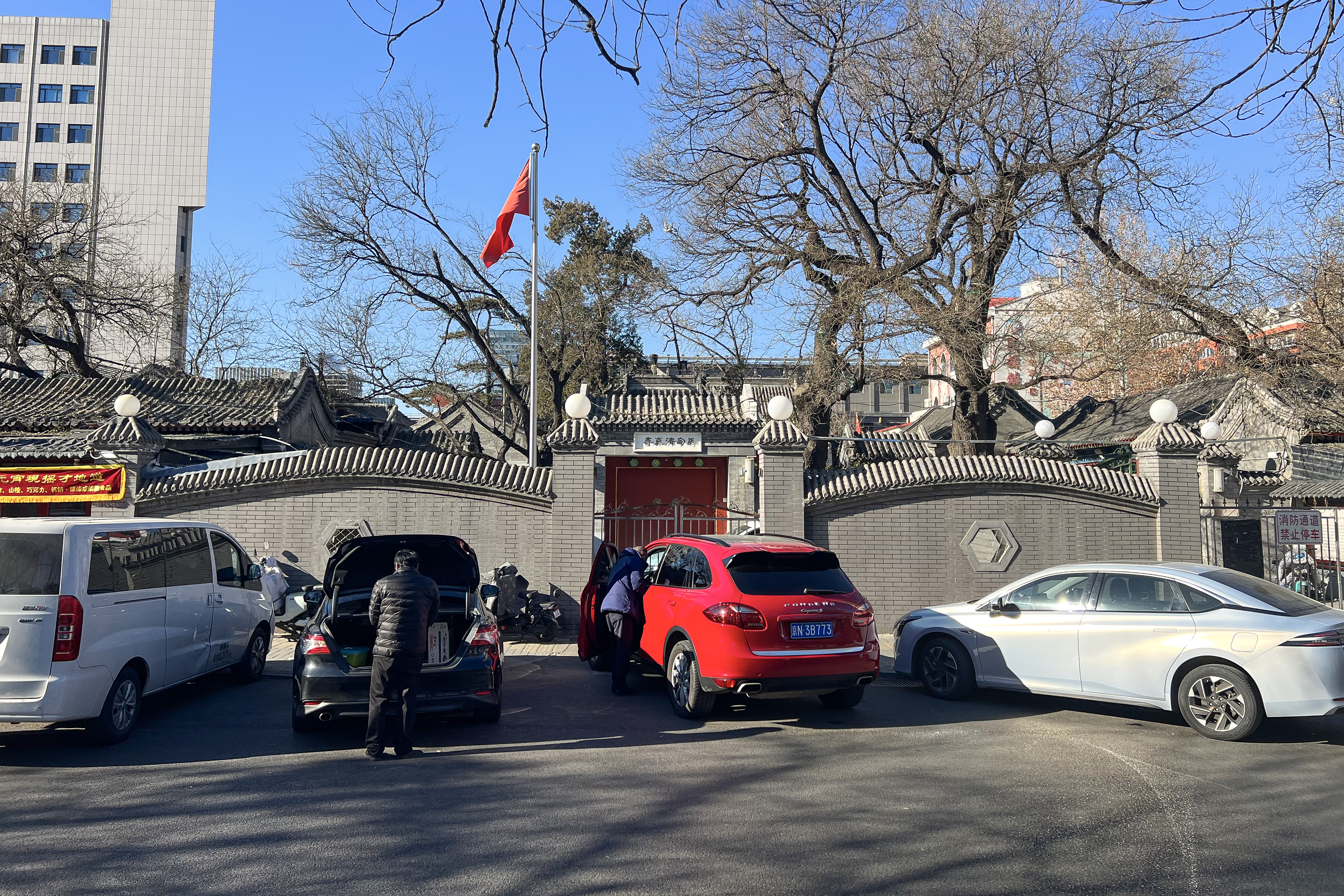

- Location of the mosque in Beijing

Religion
- Affiliation: Sunni Islam
- Ecclesiastical or organisational status: Mosque (c. 17th century–c. 1966); Profane use (1966–1982); Mosque (since 1982– )
- Status: Active

Location
- Location: Madian, Haidian, Beijing
- Country: China
- Interactive map of Madian Mosque
- Coordinates: 39°58′10.3″N 116°22′42.1″E

Architecture
- Type: Mosque
- Style: Chinese
- Completed: c. 17th century

Specifications
- Capacity: 200 worshipers
- Site area: 3,800 m^{2} (41,000 sq ft)

The Madian Mosque (simplified Chinese: 马甸清真寺; traditional Chinese: 馬甸清真寺; pinyin: Mǎdiān Qīngzhēnsì) is a mosque in Madian, Haidian District, Beijing, China.

== History ==
The mosque was constructed during the reign of Kangxi Emperor (r. 1661–1722) of Qing Dynasty due to the shear population of Hui people in the region. During the Cultural Revolution, the mosque was turned into a factory and the prayer room became a workshop. In 1982, the factory moved out and the building functioned as a mosque again.

== Architecture ==
The mosque has a capacity of 200 worshipers and located on a 3,800-square-metre (41,000 sq ft) site. It was constructed with the Chinese architecture style of building, with main building which consists of the prayer hall, south lecture hall, north lecture hall and other buildings.

== Transportation ==
The mosque is accessible within walking distance south of Jiandemen station of Beijing Subway.

== See also ==
- Islam in China
- List of mosques in China
