= Ionosphere Bay =

Bay in Cape Découverte, Antarctica

Coordinates: 66°46′S 141°35′E

Ionosphere Bay is a small bay bordering the east side of Cape Découverte, Antarctica. It was charted in 1951 by the French Antarctic Expedition and named by them for the corresponding scientific discipline, the study of the ionosphere.
