= Jiandemen station =

Beijing Subway station

Jiande Men 健德门
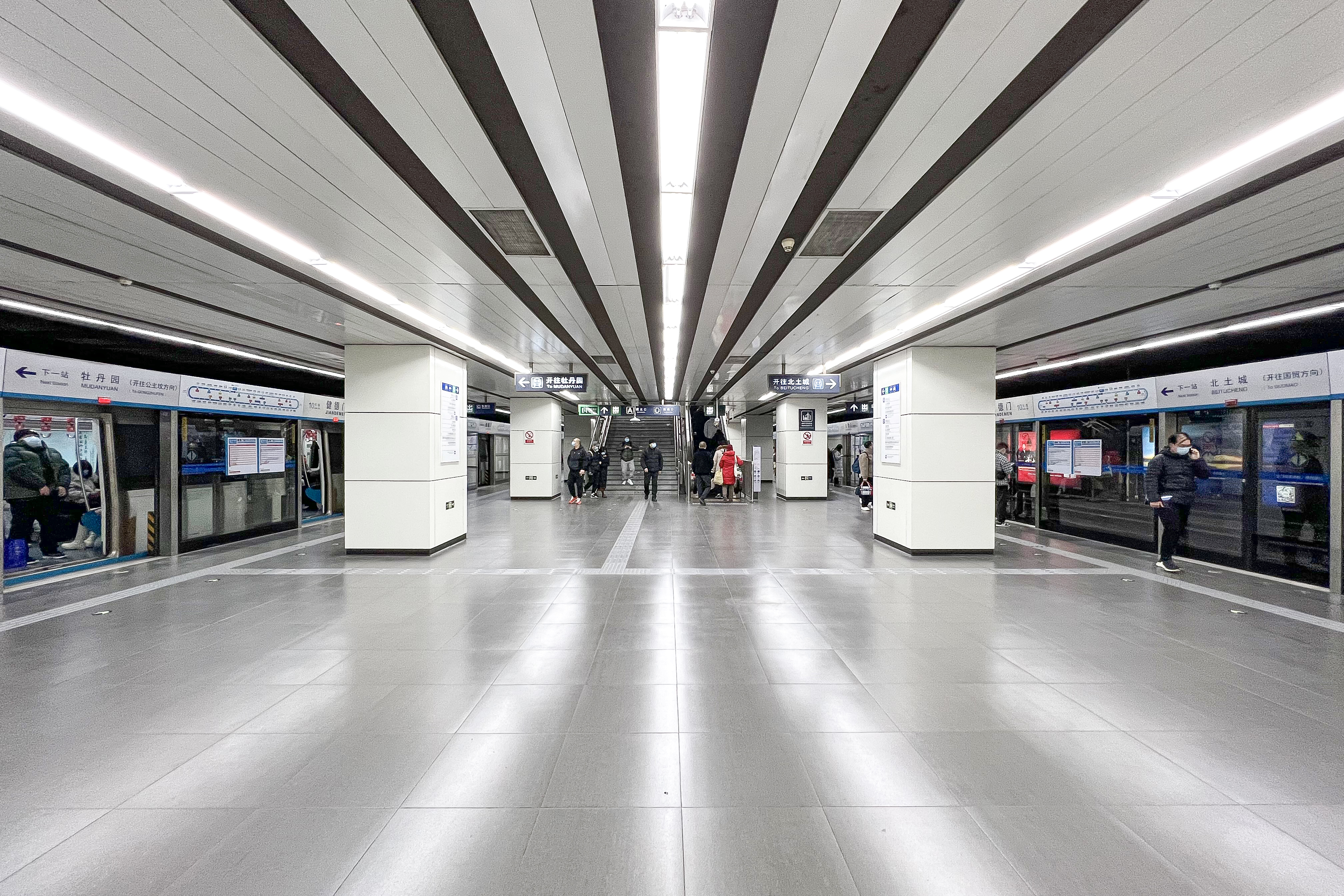
- Platform

General information
- Location: Beitucheng West Road (北土城西路) at G6 Beijing–Lhasa Expressway; Haidian District / Chaoyang District, Beijing; China
- Coordinates: 39°58′36″N 116°22′53″E
- Operator: Beijing Mass Transit Railway Operation Corporation Limited
- Line: Line 10
- Platforms: 2 (1 island platform)
- Tracks: 2

Construction
- Structure type: Underground
- Accessible: Yes

History
- Opened: July 19, 2008; 18 years ago

Services
Preceding station	Beijing Subway	Following station
Mudanyuan outer loop / anticlockwise	Line 10	Beitucheng inner loop / clockwise
Location
- Location within Beijing

Jiande Men Station (simplified Chinese: 健德门站; traditional Chinese: 健德門站; pinyin: Jiàndé Mén Zhàn) is a subway station on Line 10 of the Beijing Subway.

== Station layout ==
The station has an underground island platform.

== Exits ==
There are 3 exits, lettered A, C, and D. Exits A and D are accessible.

== Gallery ==
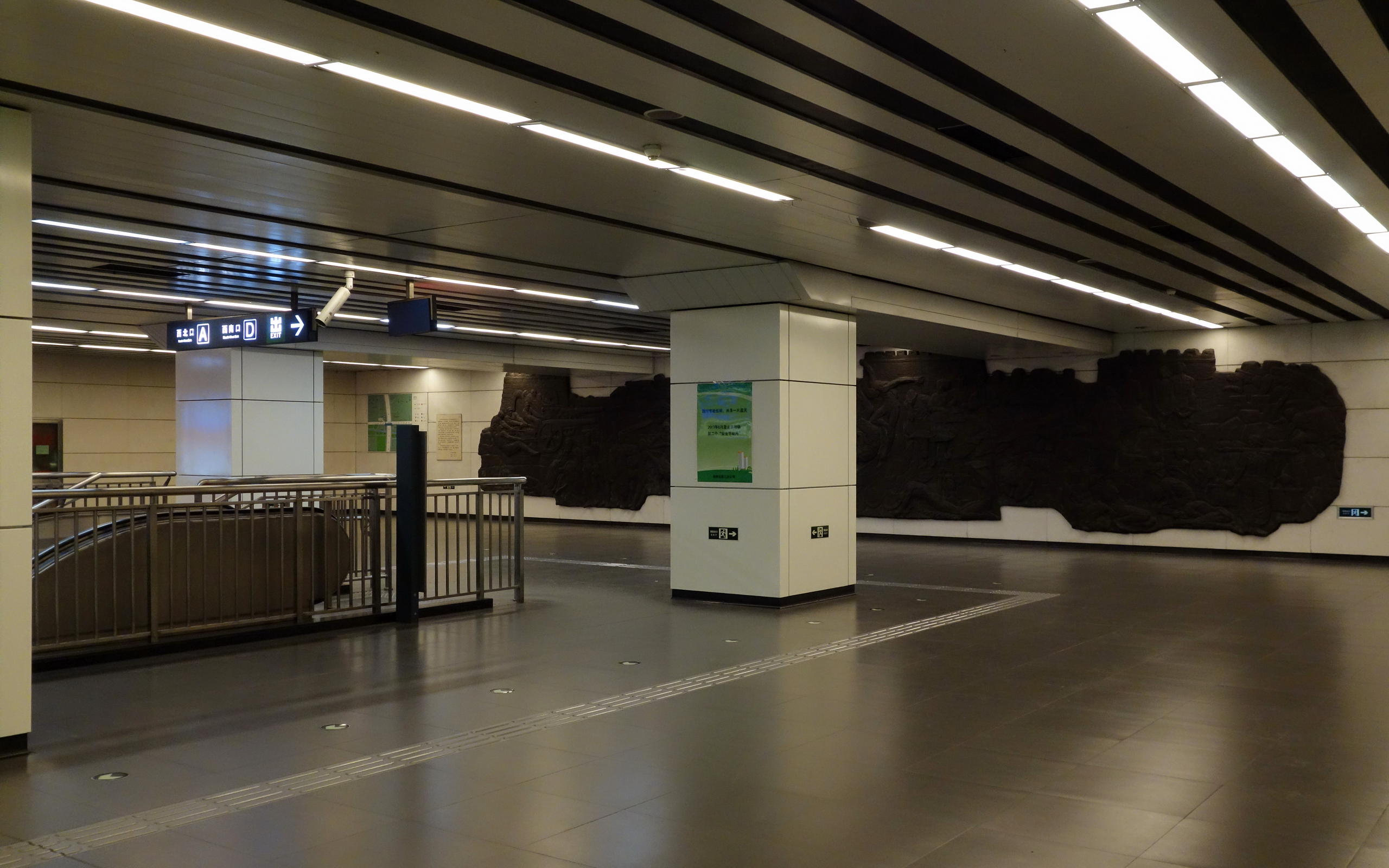
Station Hall

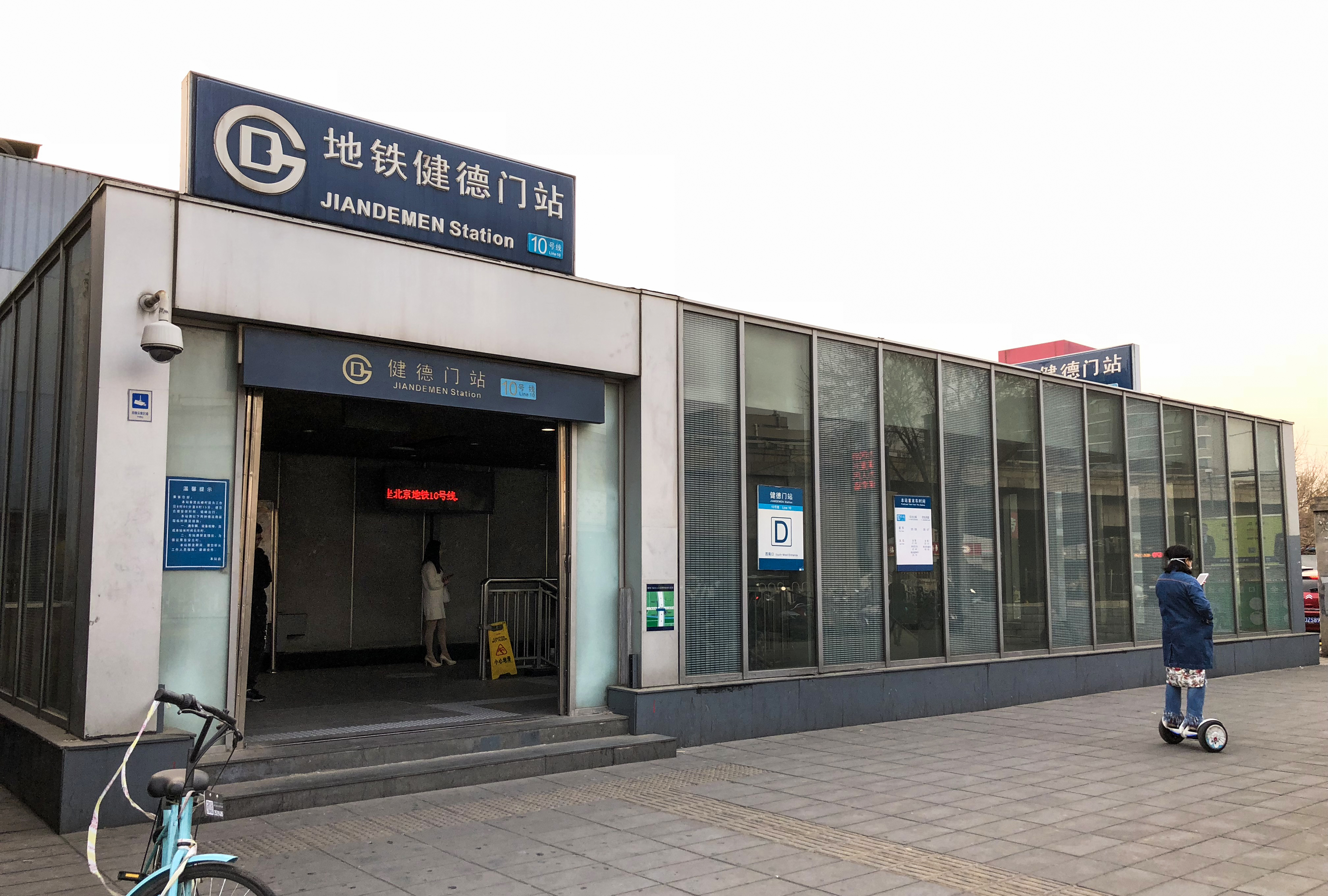
Exit D of Jiandemen Station

== Around the station ==
- Madian Mosque
