= Xuanwu, Beijing =

Former district of Beijing, China

Coordinates: 39°53′39″N 116°22′57″E

Xuanwu 宣武区
- District of the People's Republic of China
- 1952–2010
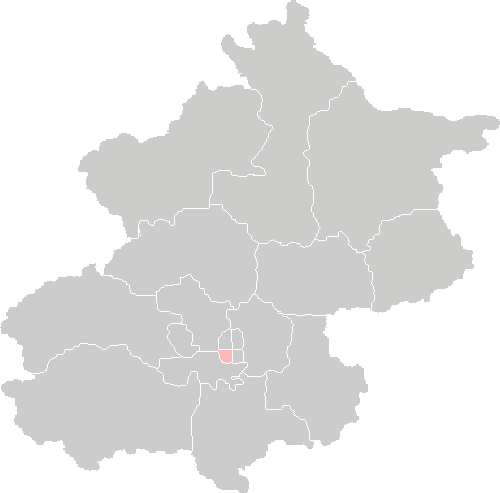
- Location of Xuanwu on Beijing.
- History
  - Established: 1952
  - Disestablished: 2010
Succeeded by
Xicheng District
- Today part of: Xicheng District

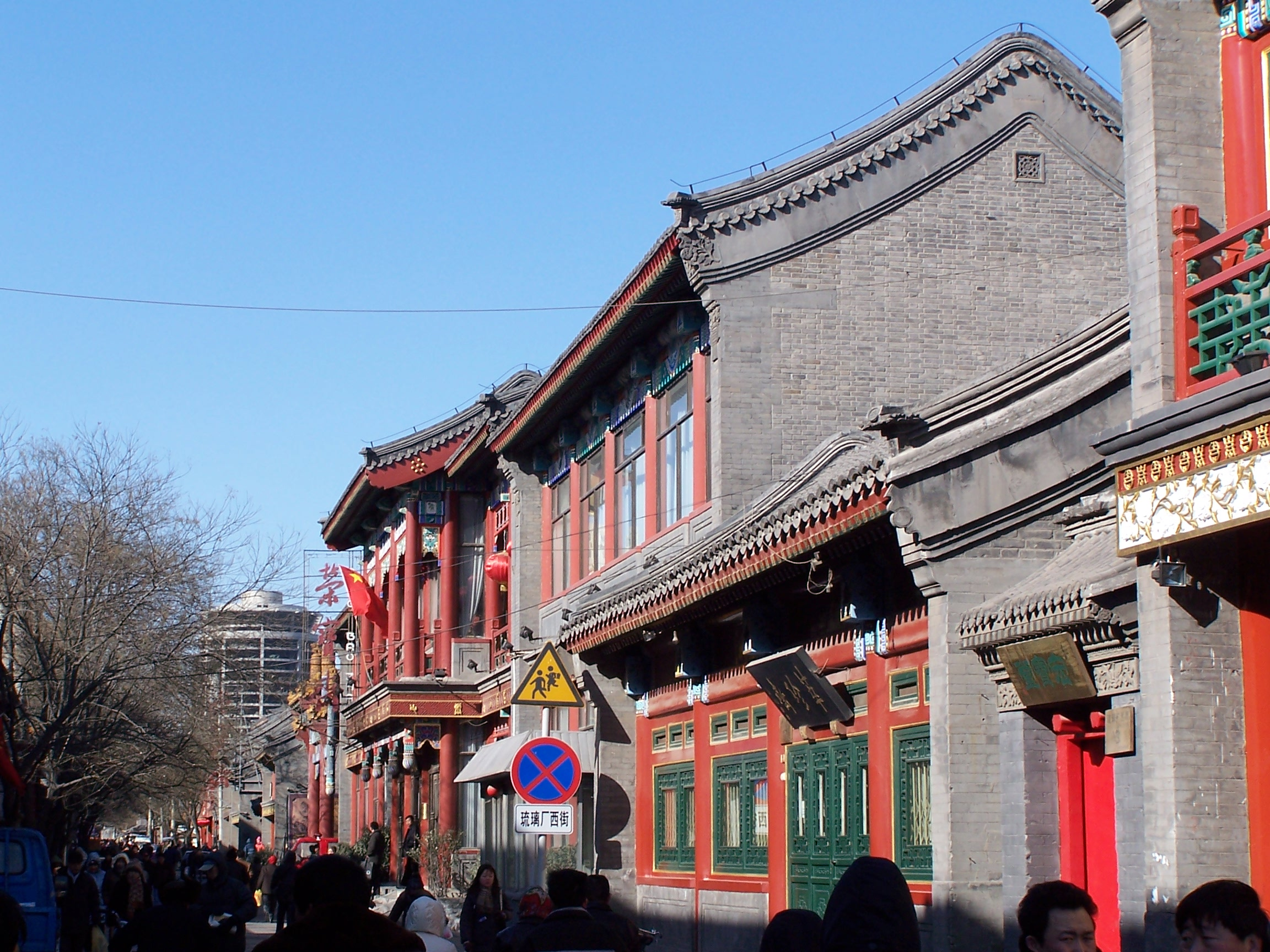
A hutong in Xuanwu during a Spring Festival Temple fair.

Xuanwu District (Chinese: 宣武区; pinyin: Xuānwǔ Qū) was a district of the Municipality of Beijing, China. It was located southwest to the city center, outside of Xuanwu Gate. The district was merged into Xicheng District in July 2010.

Located outside the Imperial Inner City and predominantly reserved for the lower class, the district was over 16.5 km^{2} in size. Although historically considered a wealthy area of Beijing as one of the older districts of the former Imperial City, Xuanwu District underwent rapid changes in its recent history leading up its merger into Xicheng District. The area was also the birthplace of Peking Opera and housed the Caishikou Execution Grounds during the Qing dynasty.

Xuanwu District had a large Muslim population.

Popular destinations in Xuanwu District include:

- Niujie Mosque
- Fayuan Temple
- Liulichang—an antiques market
- Huguang Guild Hall

== Economy ==
Wenfei Wang, Shangyi Zhou, and C. Cindy Fan, the authors of "Growth and Decline of Muslim Hui Enclaves in Beijing," stated in 2002 that Beijing's economic development was northward oriented and the economic development in the Xuanwu District "lags behind" Dongcheng District and Xicheng District, adjacent districts located towards the north.

== Education ==
Prior to the district's dissolution, The High School Affiliated to Beijing Normal University was located in Xuanwu.

One school in Niujie, the Beijing Xuanwu Huimin Elementary School (Chinese: 北京市宣武回民小学; pinyin: Běijīng Shì Xuānwǔ Huímín Xiǎoxué), serves the Hui people living in Beijing. That was previously in the Xuanwu District.

Xuanwu Normal Experimental Affiliated Number One Primary School (北京市宣武师范学校附属第一小学) is located in the former Xuanwu District.
