= Chinese Islamic cuisine =

Culinary traditions of Chinese Muslims

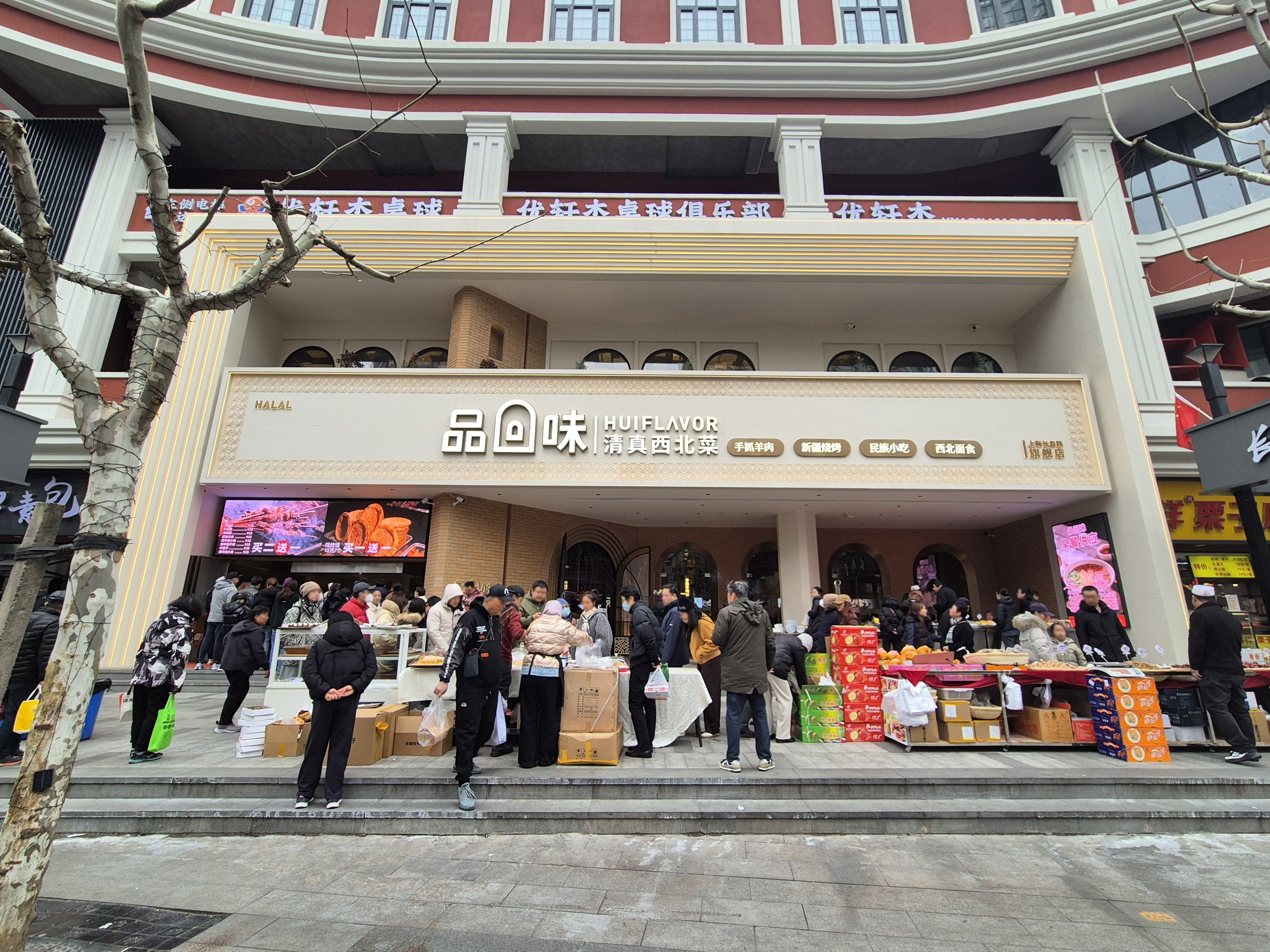
- A halal store and food center in Shanghai
- Chinese: 清真菜
Transcriptions
Standard Mandarin
- Hanyu Pinyin: qīngzhēn cài
other Mandarin
- Dungan: Чинжын цэ

Ethnic Hui cuisine
- Chinese: 回族菜
Transcriptions
Standard Mandarin
- Hanyu Pinyin: Huízú cài
other Mandarin
- Dungan: Хуэйзў цэ

Chinese Islamic cuisine consists of variations of regionally popular foods that are typical of Han Chinese cuisine, in particular to make them halal. Dishes borrow ingredients from Middle Eastern, Turkic, Iranian and South Asian cuisines, notably mutton and spices. Much like other northern Chinese cuisines, Chinese Islamic cuisine uses wheat noodles as the staple, rather than rice. Chinese Islamic dishes include clear-broth beef noodle soup and chuanr.

The Hui (Chinese-speaking Muslims), Bonan, Dongxiang, Salar and Uyghurs of China, as well as the Dungans of Central Asia and the Panthays of Burma, collectively contribute to Chinese Islamic cuisine.

== History ==
Due to the large Muslim population in Western China, many Chinese restaurants cater to or are run by Muslims. Northern Chinese Islamic cuisine originated in China proper. It is heavily influenced by Beijing cuisine, with nearly identical cooking methods and differing only when there are religious restrictions.

During the Yuan dynasty, halal and kosher methods of slaughtering animals and preparing food were banned and forbidden by the Mongol emperors, starting with Genghis Khan who banned Muslims and Jews from slaughtering their animals their own way and made them follow the Mongol method.

Among all the [subject] alien peoples only the Hui-hui say "we do not eat Mongol food." [Cinggis Qa'an replied:] "By the aid of heaven we have pacified you; you are our slaves. Yet you do not eat our food or drink. How can this be right?" He thereupon made them eat. "If you slaughter sheep, you will be considered guilty of a crime." He issued a regulation to that effect ... [In 1279/1280 under Qubilai] all the Muslims say: “if someone else slaughters [the animal] we do not eat." Because the poor people are upset by this, from now on, Musuluman [Muslim] Huihui and Zhuhu [Jewish] Huihui, no matter who kills [the animal] will eat [it] and must cease slaughtering sheep themselves, and cease the rite of circumcision.

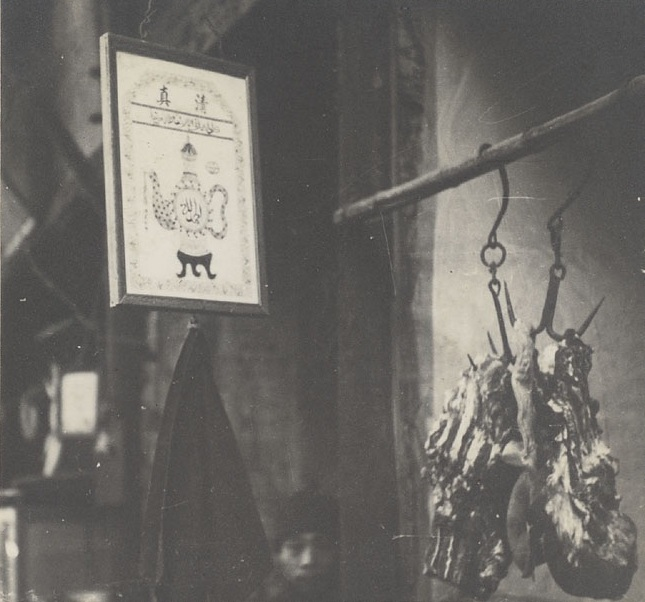
A halal meat store in Hankou, c. 1934 to 1935

== Background ==
A Chinese Islamic restaurant (Chinese: 淸眞菜館; pinyin: qīngzhēn càiguǎn) can be similar to a Mandarin restaurant with the exception that there is no pork on the menu and the dishes are primarily based on noodles or soup.

However, there is a distinction between Northern and Southern Chinese Islamic cuisines. While both use lamb, or mutton, Northern Chinese Islamic cuisine relies heavily on beef, but rarely duck, geese, shrimp or seafood, while southern Islamic cuisine is the reverse. This difference is due to availability of the ingredients. Oxen have been long used for farming and Chinese governments have frequently prohibited the slaughter of oxen for food. However, due to the geographic proximity of the northern part of China to minority-dominated regions that were not subjected to such restrictions, beef could be easily purchased and transported to Northern China. (Each restaurant serving beef noodles must be at least 400 meters from another of its type if they belong to Hui Muslims, since Hui have a pact in Ningxia, Gansu and Shaanxi.)

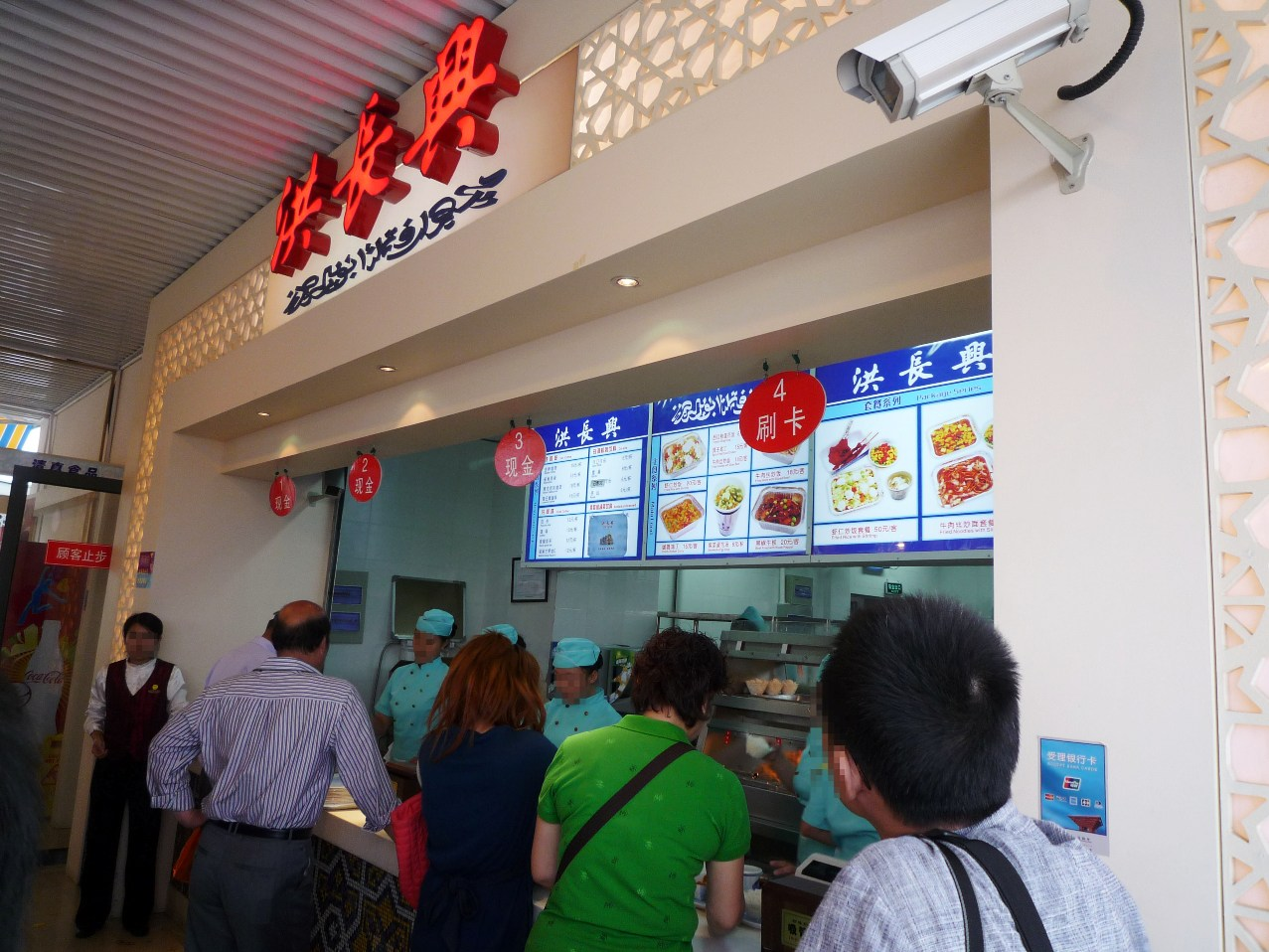
An Islamic fast-food restaurant at Shanghai Expo

In the east, Beijing's Muslim Quarter combines Hui and regional Chinese cooking in dishes like fried buns and mutton stew.

Outside of China, Chinese Hui Muslims who moved from Yunnan to Burma (Myanmar) are known as Panthays; they operate restaurants and stalls serving Chinese Islamic cuisine. Chinese Hui Muslims from Yunnan who moved to Thailand are known as Chin Haw and they also may serve Chinese Islamic food.

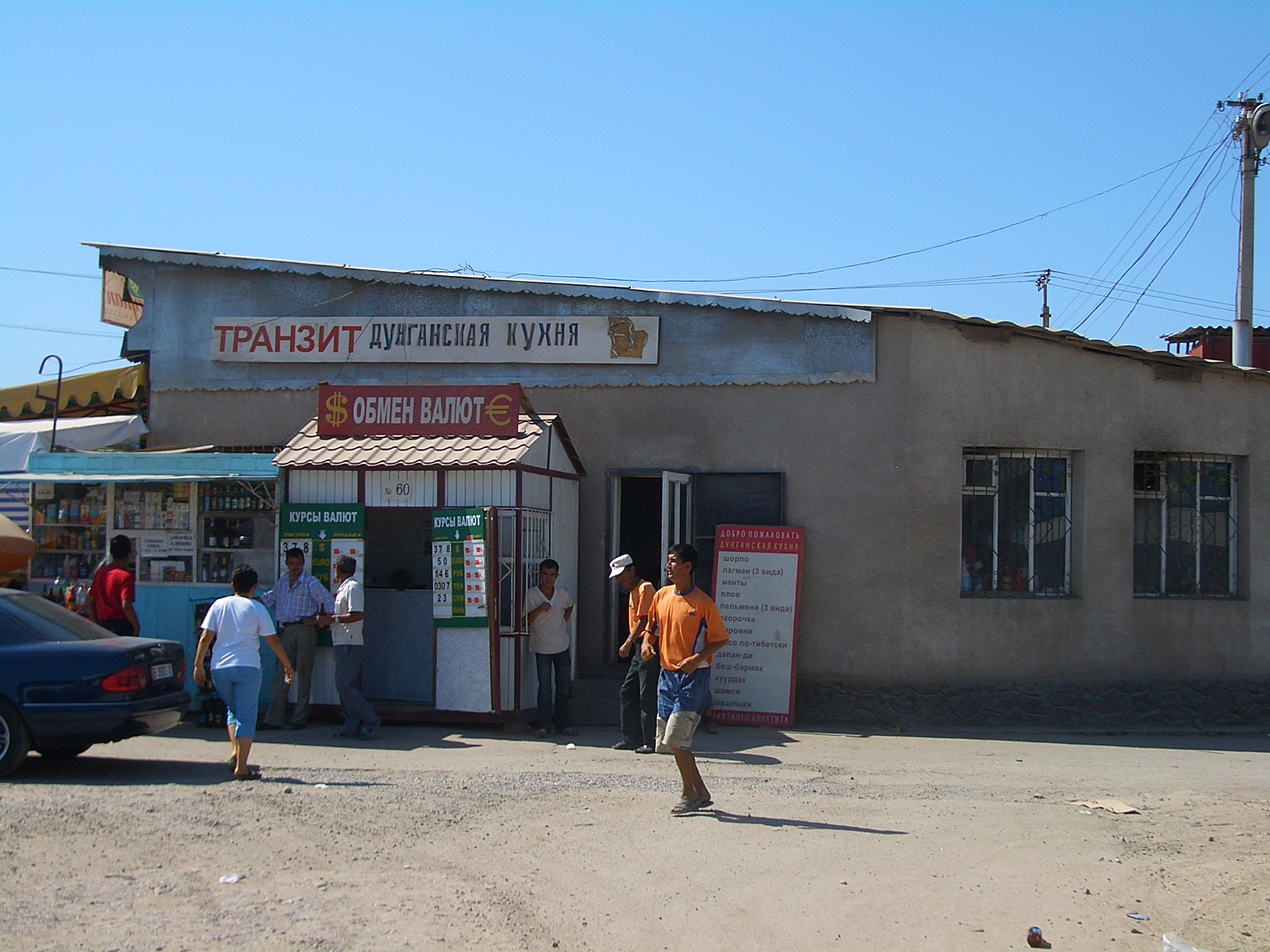
Restaurant in Bishkek, Kyrgyzstan, advertising Dungan cuisine.

In Central Asia, Dungan people, descendants of Hui, operate restaurants serving Chinese Islamic cuisine with chopsticks. The Hui who migrated to Taiwan operate Qingzhen restaurants and stalls serving Chinese Islamic cuisine in Taipei and other major cities.

Because of halal cleanliness standards, many Muslim Chinese restaurants are popular with non-Muslims.

== Dishes ==
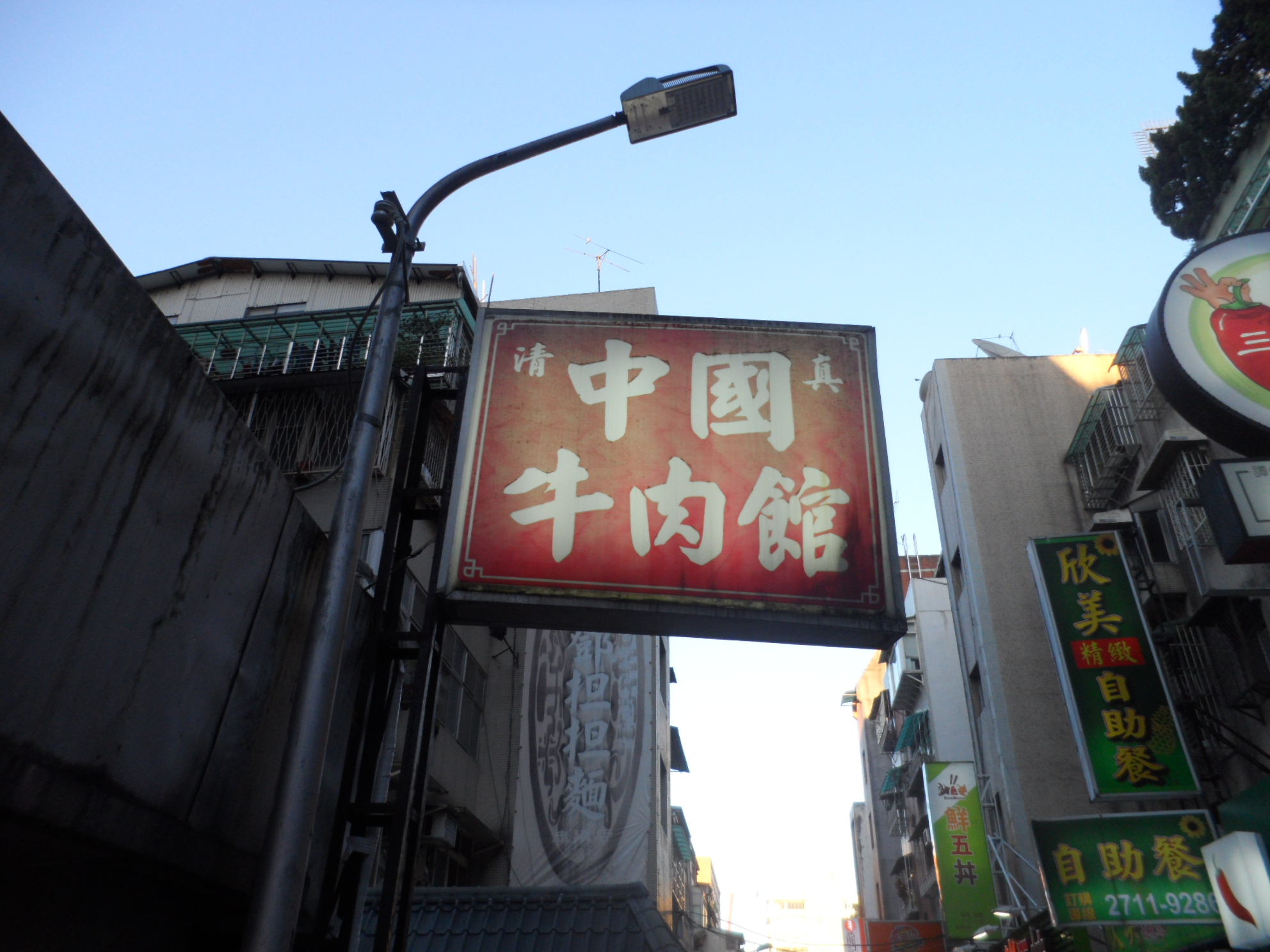
Chinese halal restaurant in Taipei, Taiwan

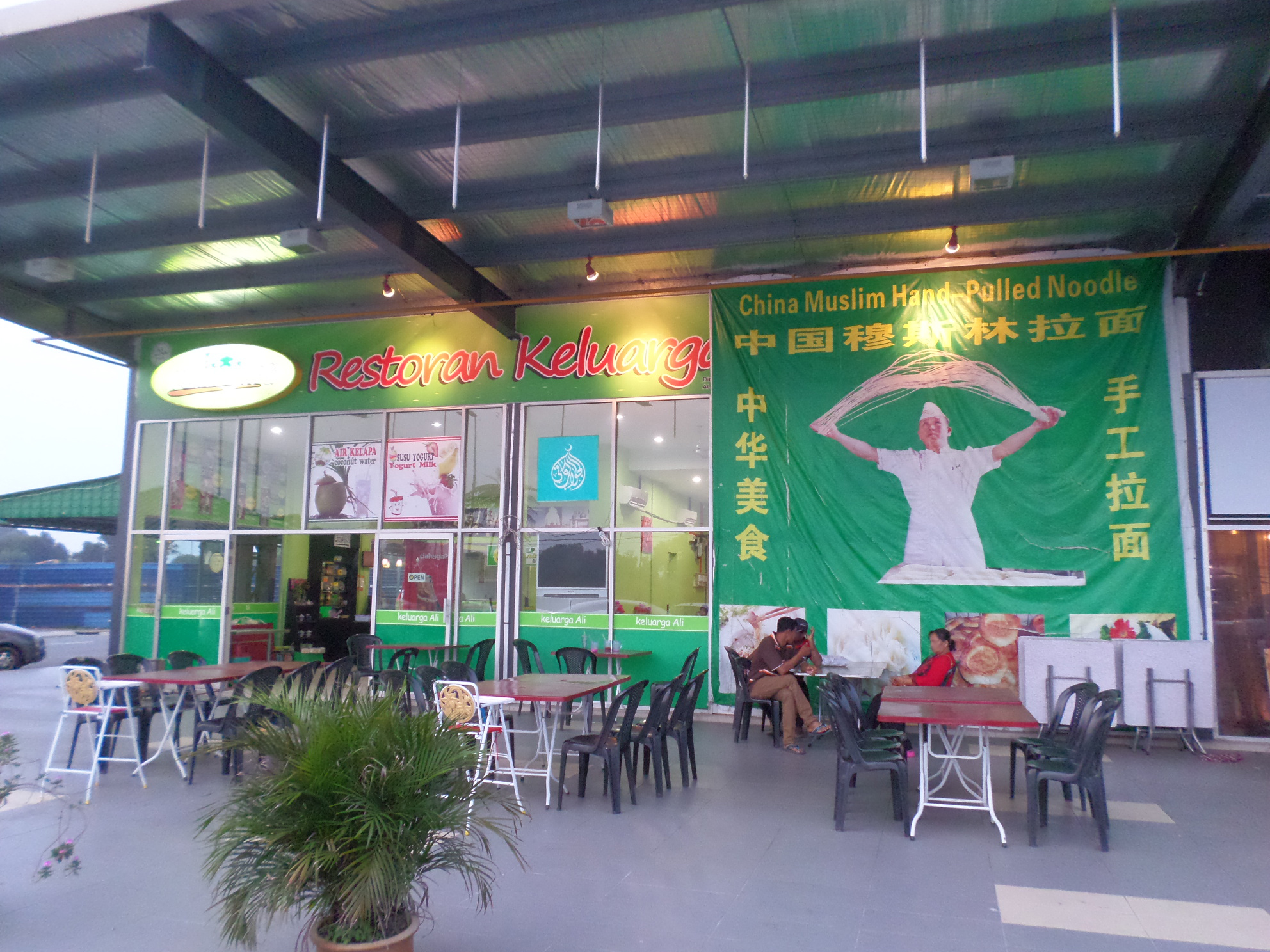
Chinese Islamic restaurant in Melaka, Malaysia

=== Lamian ===
Lamian (simplified Chinese: 拉面; traditional Chinese: 拉麪; pinyin: lāmiàn, Dungan: Ламян) is a Chinese dish of hand-made noodles, usually served in a beef or mutton-flavored soup (湯麪; tāngmiàn, даңмян), but sometimes stir-fried (炒麪; chǎomiàn, Чаомян) and served with a tomato-based sauce. Lā means to pull or stretch, while miàn means noodle. The hand-making process involves taking a lump of dough and repeatedly stretching it to produce a single very long noodle. There exists a local variant in Lanzhou, the Lanzhou beef noodles, also known as Lanzhou lamian. It is may also be called laghman.

=== Chuanr ===
Chuanr (Chinese: 串儿; pinyin: chuànr, Dungan: Чўанр, "kebab"), originating in Xinjiang and in recent years has been disseminated throughout the rest of that country, most notably in Beijing. It is a product of the Chinese Islamic cuisine of the Uyghur people and other Chinese Muslims.

=== Nang ===
Nang (馕, Нәң) is a type of round unleavened bread, topped with sesame. It is similar to South and Central Asia naan.

== Image gallery ==
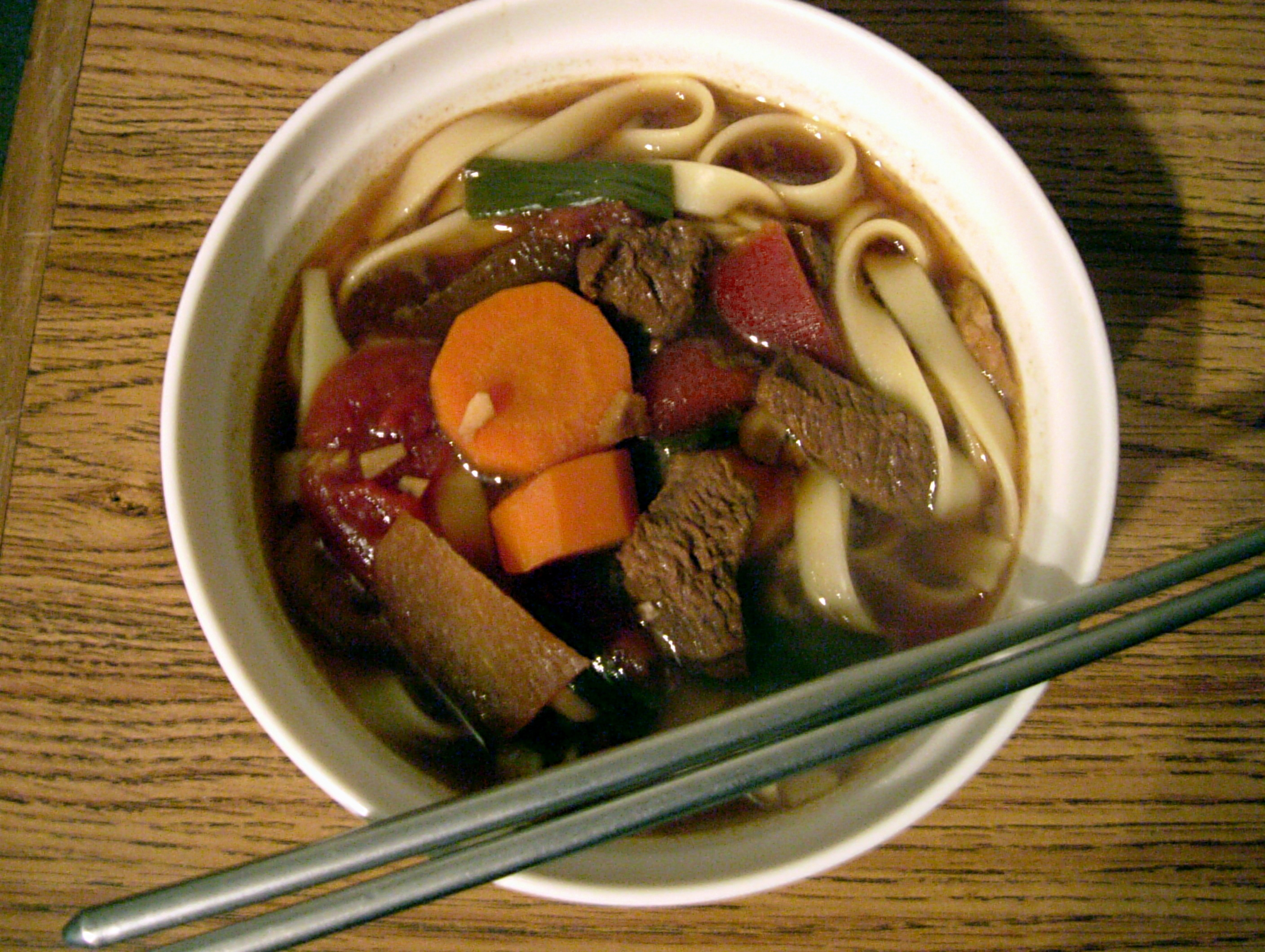
Beef noodle served

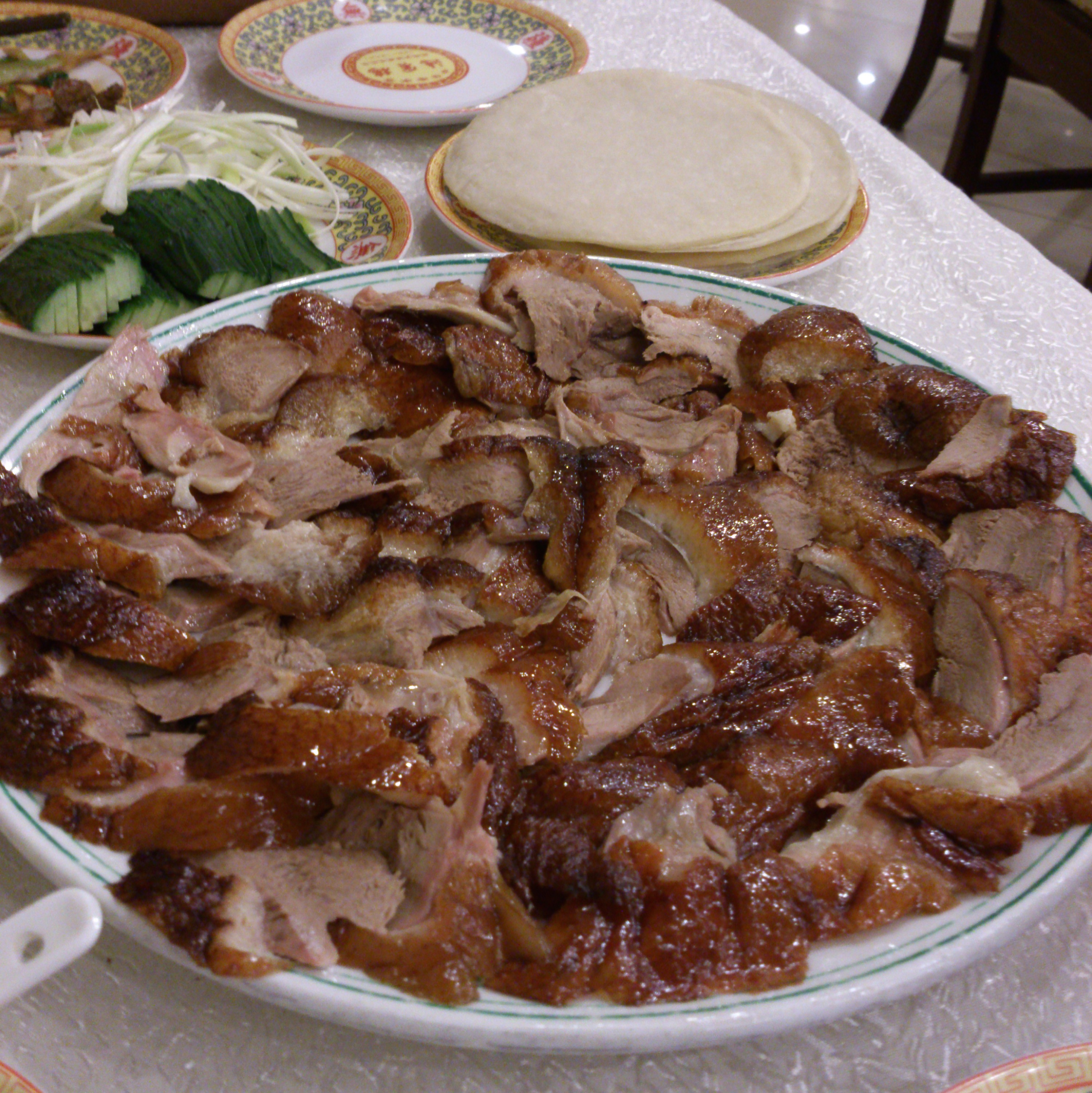
Peking duck served at a halal restaurant in Beijing

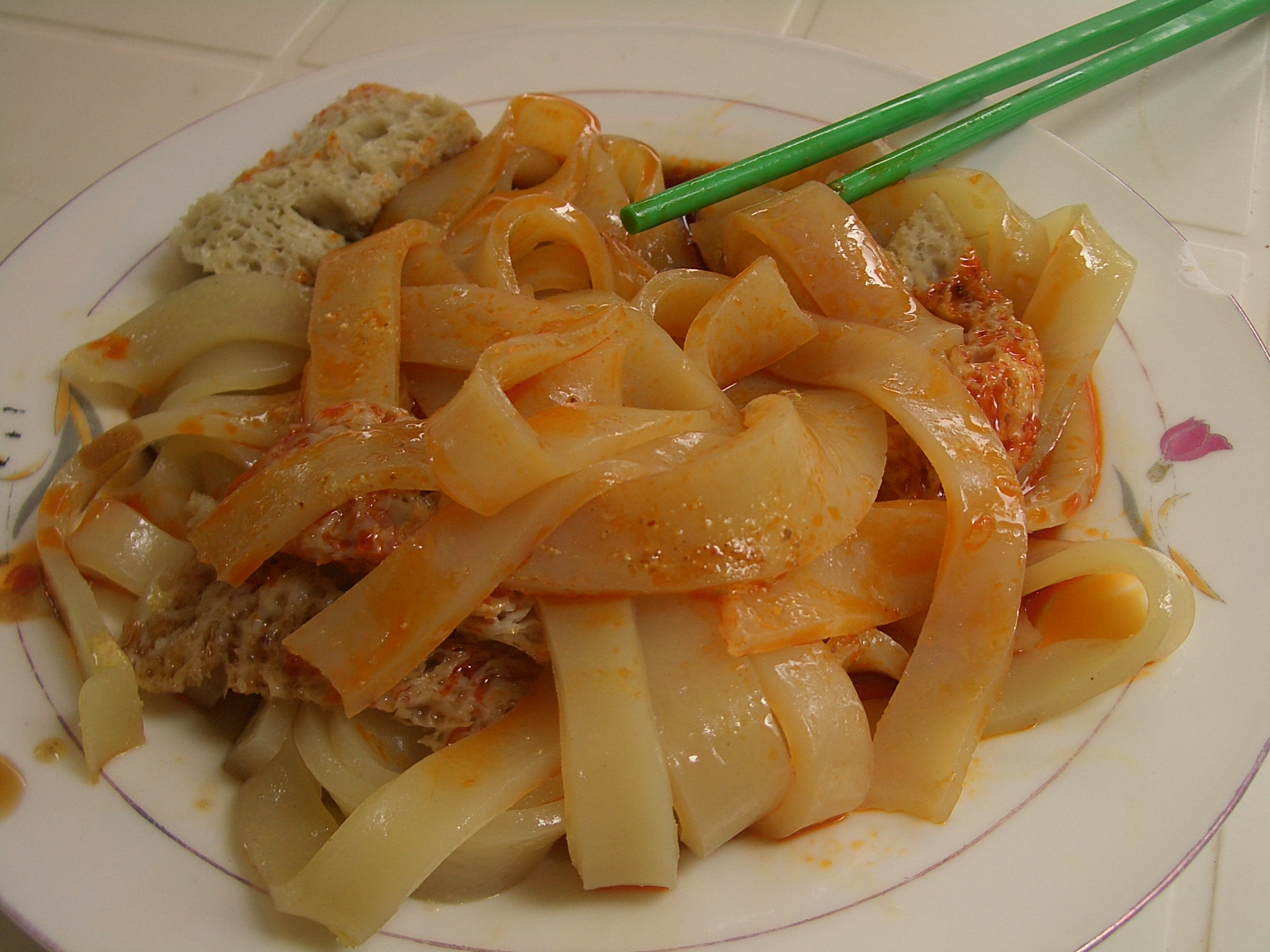
Niang pi (酿皮, Няң пы), a popular vegetarian noodle cold dish in Linxia

== See also ==
- Chinese cuisine
- Islam in China
- Uyghur cuisine
- Dali City
- Gansu
- Kunming
- Lanzhou
- Ningxia
- Qinghai
- Shaanxi
- Xi'an
- Yunnan
