= Curzon Islands =

Islands of Antarctica

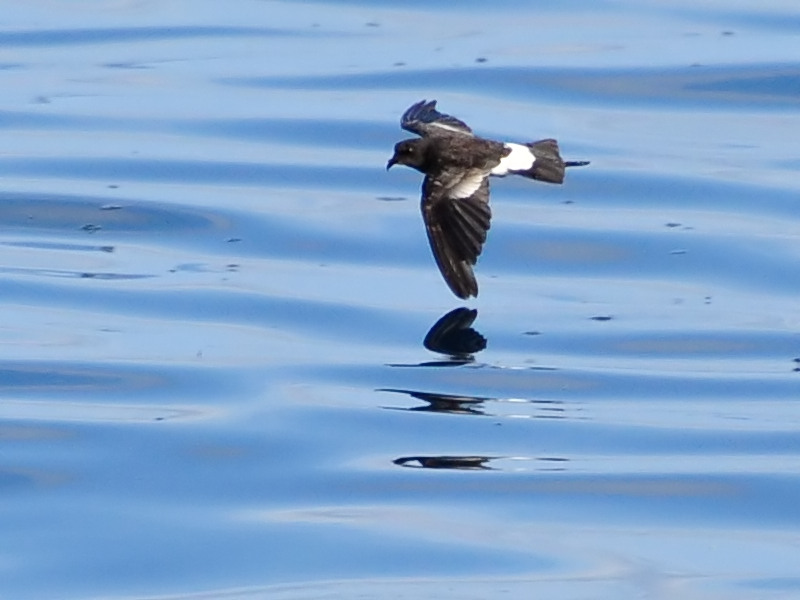
- Wilson's storm petrels breed in the islands

- Location within Antarctica

Geography
- Location: Antarctica
- Coordinates: 66°46′S 141°35′E

Administration
- Administered under the Antarctic Treaty System

Demographics
- Population: Uninhabited

The Curzon Islands are a small group of rocky islands lying close off Cape Découverte, Adélie Coast. They were probably sighted in January 1840 by a French expedition under Captain Jules Dumont d'Urville, though not identified as islands on d'Urville's maps. The islands were roughly charted in 1912 by Captain J.K. Davis of the Australasian Antarctic Expedition ship Aurora and named by Mawson for Lord Curzon, the President of the Royal Geographical Society, 1911–14. The islands were mapped in detail by the French Antarctic Expedition, 1950–52.

== Important Bird Area ==
A 359 ha site comprising the island group and the intervening marine area has been designated an Important Bird Area (IBA) by BirdLife International because it supports about 13,000 breeding pairs of Adélie penguins, mainly on Retour Island, the largest of the group. South polar skuas and Wilson's storm-petrels also breed in the islands. The closest permanent station is the French Dumont d'Urville, some 70 km to the west.

== See also ==
- List of Antarctic and sub-Antarctic islands
