= Cape Découverte =

Island cape in Adélie Land, Antarctica

Cape Découverte or Cape Discovery (66°46′S 141°33′E) is the point of rocks which marks the northwest extremity of the Curzon Islands along the Adélie Coast. It was discovered on 21 January 1840, by the French Antarctic Expedition, 1837–40, under Captain Jules Dumont d'Urville who gave the name "Cap de la Decouverte" (cape of the discovery). It was the first rocky point of the coast seen by members of the expedition.
