= Dru C. Gladney =

American anthropologist (1956–2022)

- Gladney in 2008
- Born: November 3, 1956; Pomona, California, U.S.
- Died: March 17, 2022 (aged 65)

Dru Curtis Gladney (November 3, 1956 – March 17, 2022) was an American anthropologist who was president of the Pacific Basin Institute at Pomona College and a professor of anthropology there. Gladney authored four books and more than 100 academic articles and book chapters on topics spanning the Asian continent.

== Early life ==
Gladney was born and raised in Pomona, California, and attended Westmont College, where he earned a B.A. in philosophy and religious studies, followed by M.A.s in theology and cross-cultural studies from Fuller Theological Seminary. He received an M.A. in anthropology and his Ph.D. in Social Anthropology from the University of Washington, Seattle, in 1987.

== Career and research ==
Gladney focused his research on ethnic and cultural nationalism in Asia, specializing in the peoples, politics, and cultures of the Silk Road and Muslim Chinese (or Hui). A two-time Fulbright Research Scholar to China and Turkey, he conducted long-term field research in Western China, Central Asia, and Turkey. The results of his work have been featured on CNN, BBC, Voice of America, National Public Radio, al-Jazeerah, and in Newsweek, Time, The Washington Post, International Herald Tribune, Los Angeles Times and The New York Times.

Gladney's 2004 book, Dislocating China: Muslims, Minorities, and Other Subaltern Subjects was published by the University of Chicago Press. His 1991 Harvard East Asian Monographs 149 book was Muslim Chinese: Ethnic Nationalism in the People's Republic. He authored (1998) Ethnic Identity in China: The Making of a Muslim Minority Nationality; and was editor of Making Majorities: Constituting the Nation in Japan, China, Korea, Malaysia, Fiji, Turkey, and the U.S.

Gladney joined the Pomona College faculty in 2006 as a professor of anthropology. He was president of the Pacific Basin Institute and chair of the anthropology department for a time. He held faculty positions and post-doctoral fellowships at Harvard University; the University of Southern California; King's College, Cambridge, the Institute for Advanced Study, Princeton; the East–West Center, Honolulu; and the University of Hawai'i at Manoa. He was a consultant to the Soros Foundation, Ford Foundation, World Bank, Asian Development Bank, Getty Museum, National Academy of Sciences, European Center for Conflict Prevention, U.N. High Commissioner for Refugees, and UNESCO. He served on the advisory board of the East Turkistan National Awakening Movement.

== Death ==
Gladney died on March 17, 2022, aged 65.
