= French Antarctic Expedition =

Research expedition

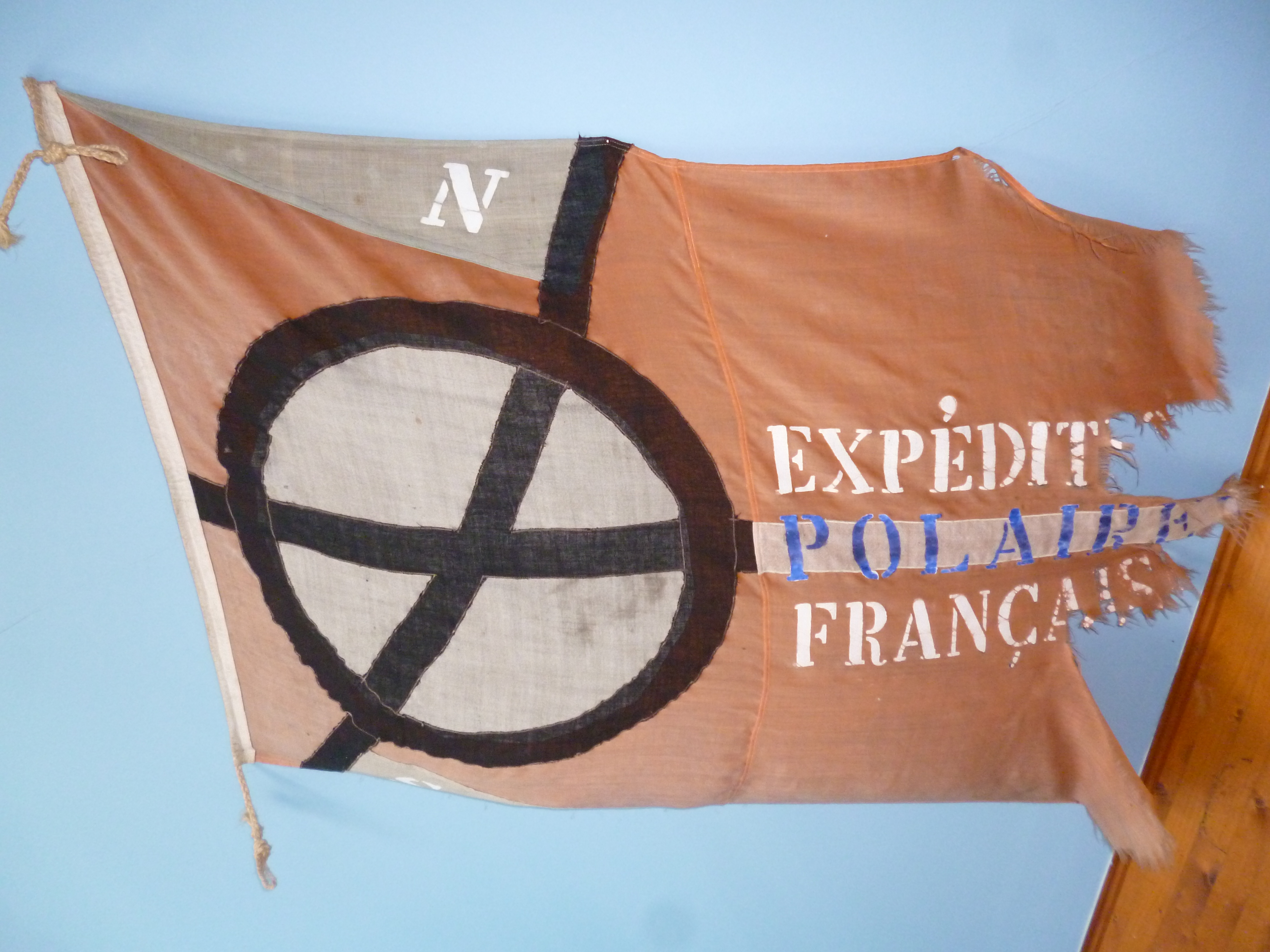
Flag of the Expéditions Polaires Françaises.

The French Antarctic Expedition is any of several French expeditions in Antarctica.

== 1837–1840 ==
In 1837, during an 1837–1840 expedition across the deep southern hemisphere, Captain Jules Dumont d'Urville sailed his ship Astrolabe along a coastal area of Antarctica which he later named Adélie Land, in honor of his wife. During the Antarctic part of this expedition, Dumont d'Urville team performed the first experiments to determine the approximate position of the South magnetic pole, and landed on Débarquement Rock in the Géologie Archipelago, (66°36′19″S 140°4′0″E) just 4 km from the mainland, where he took mineral and animal samples. On his return to France in 1840 he was made rear admiral.

== 1904–1907 ==
Jean-Baptiste Charcot was appointed leader of a 1904–1907 French Antarctic Expedition, aboard the ship Français, exploring the west coast of Graham Land portion of the Antarctic Peninsula. The expedition reached Adelaide Island in 1905 and took pictures of the Palmer Archipelago and Loubet Coast.

They roughly surveyed, the SW coast of Anvers Island in 1904. They gave the name "Presqu'ile de Biscoe" to a small peninsula on the SE side of Biscoe Bay, adding to the honours for John Biscoe – who may have landed in the vicinity in 1832. While the name "Presqu'ile de Biscoe" has not endured, the resurvey by the Falkland Islands Dependencies Survey in 1955 named Biscoe Point for the rocky point found in the approximate location of Charcot's Presqu'ile.

Loubet Land was explored in January 1905 and named after Émile Loubet, then President of France.

Rabot Island was first charted by the expedition and named after Charles Rabot.

They mapped Watkins Island but did not name it. They also charted Arthur Harbour.

Mount Francais (64°38′S 63°27′W) in the Trojan Range was named after the expedition ship Français.

Lavoisier Island was named 'Ile Nansen' after Fridtjof Nansen, Norwegian Arctic explorer. The name was changed in 1960 to avoid confusion with nearby Nansen Island, so named in 1898 by a Belgian expedition.

Bonaparte Point (64°47′S 64°05′W) was charted and named for Prince Roland Bonaparte, then President of the Paris Geographical Society.

Logistics support for this expedition was provided by the Argentine Navy (Armada de la República Argentina), employing the legendary corvette ARA Uruguay.

== 1908–1911 ==
Within a year of returning from the Second Expedition, Charcot commanded a new expedition from 1908 to 1911. Sailing on the ship Pourquoi-Pas? IV (Why Not? IV), the expedition explored the Bellingshausen Sea, the Amundsen Sea, and discovered, charted and named several features.

Loubet Land was named for Émile Loubet, the President of France during Charcot's earlier expedition.

Charcot Island was named for the Captain himself.

The expedition moored aboard ship in a cove on the southeast side of Petermann Island, which they named Port Circumcision because it was spotted 1 January 1909, the traditional day for the Feast of the Circumcision.

Renaud Island was first charted and named. Fallieres Coast was first explored in January 1909, and Charcot named for Clément Armand Fallières, then President of France.

Mikkelsen Bay was first seen from a distance in 1909, but it was not recognised as a bay. The Mikkelsen Islands were named after Otto Mikkelsen, a Norwegian diver who inspected the damaged hull of the Pourquoi-Pas at Deception Island.

Marguerite Bay was discovered in 1909 and Charcot named the bay after his wife. Jenny Island, in Marguerite Bay, was discovered and named by Charcot for the wife of Sub-Lieutenant Maurice Bongrain, second officer of the expedition.

The name "Pavie" was given in 1909 to an island, or possible cape, shown on the expedition's maps at 68°27′S 66°40′W. Viewed from a position some 15 to 17 miles southeast of Jenny Island, expedition surveyor Maurice Bongrain made sketches of this feature which were labeled both "Île Pavie" and "Cap Pavie". The area later became known as Pavie Ridge.

Adelaide Island was first surveyed by the expedition. They also discovered Millerand Island, which was likely named for Alexandre Millerand, French statesman. Douglas Range was seen from a distance.

Rothschild Island was named after Baron Edouard Alphonse de Rothschild (1868–1949), head of the French branch of the Rothschild family and president of the Rothschild Brothers bank.

The northern portion of Wilkins Sound was first seen and roughly mapped in 1910 by the expedition.

== 1948–1949 ==
This aborted expedition was led by André-Frank Liotard in 1948–1949. With a total of 62 members, 30 dogs, and 200 tons of equipment aboard Commandant Charcot, it was planned to leave a party of eleven in Adélie Land, where a base was to be constructed. But, with heavy ice pack in February 1949, the ship could never reach the Antarctic coast (southernmost point: latitude 66°11', an estimated 45 miles from the coastline). On their return trip from Antarctica, a party was briefly landed on 3 March 1949 on Sabrina Island, one of the Balleny Islands. The expedition also visited the newly-established Australian base of Macquarie Island, where they made a depot of 7,000 L fuel.

== 1949–1951 ==
André-Frank Liotard returned to Adélie Land in 1949–1951, again aboard Commandant Charcot. Eleven of the expedition party and 28 dogs were put ashore, and Port Martin Station was established some 60 km to the west of Cape Denison where Douglas Mawson had wintered 40 years before. The party spent a full year doing weather and astronomical research. The expedition charted and named Français Glacier Tongue, Ionosphere Bay and Parasite Bay, among others.

== 1950–1952 ==
In 1950–1952, Michel Barré led a party of seventeen that wintered at Port Martin.

== 1951–1953 ==
Two parties were planned to winter in Adélie Land in 1952: one in Port Martin under the leadership of René Garcia; the other in a hut to be erected in the Géologie Archipelago, some 65 km to the west of Port Martin, where an Emperor penguin rookery had been discovered by the 1949–1951 expedition. A fire destroyed Port Martin on 23 January 1952 on the eve the ship Tottan left, and the expedition main party had to re-embark. A small group of seven men decided however to be put ashore at Pointe Géologie, where they wintered under the leadership of Mario Marret. They were relieved in early 1953.

This marks the end of French winterings in Adélie Land before the permanent Dumont d'Urville Station was established in 1956 on Petrel Island, replacing the old base built there in 1952.

== Numbering ==
The French Polar Expeditions, which have carried out logistics in Adélie Land as of 1948, have adopted a numbering that leaves out Jean-Baptiste Charcot's two voyages of exploration because they do not concern Adélie Land. Thus, they refer to the 1837–1840 expedition as "TA 1" ("TA" is for: "Terre Adélie", Adélie Land in French), while the 1951–1953 expedition is "TA 5". The next expedition in 1956 is "TA 6".

== See also ==
- List of Antarctic expeditions
- Heroic Age of Antarctic Exploration
- European and American voyages of scientific exploration

== Bibliography ==
- Dubard, Pierre; Bayle, Luc-Marie (1951). Le "Charcot" et la Terre Adélie (in French). Paris: Éditions France Empire.
- Barré, Michel (1994) [1st pub. 1953, Paris: René Julliard]. Blizzard: Terre Adélie 1951 (in French). Rennes: Éditions Ouest-France. ISBN 978-2-7373-1657-9.
