= Tan Sitong =

Chinese philosopher and reformist (1865–1898)

Tan Sitong 譚嗣同
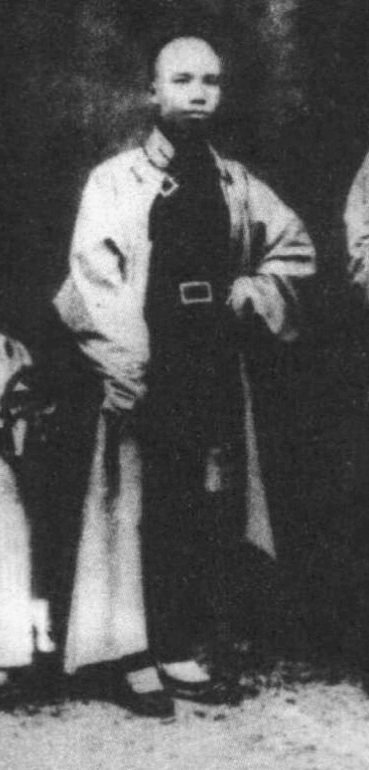

Military Secretary of Grand Council 軍機章京
- In office May – September 1898

Personal details
- Born: 10 March 1865 Beijing, Qing China
- Died: 28 September 1898 (aged 33) Caishikou Execution Grounds, Beijing, Qing China
- Cause of death: Execution by beheading
- Occupation: Government official, reformer, writer

Tan Sitong
- Traditional Chinese: 譚嗣同
- Simplified Chinese: 谭嗣同
Transcriptions
Standard Mandarin
- Hanyu Pinyin: Tán Sìtóng
- Wade–Giles: T'an^{2} Ssu^{4}-t'ung^{2}
- IPA: [tʰǎn sɨ̂tʰʊ̌ŋ]

Tan Sitong (simplified Chinese: 谭嗣同; traditional Chinese: 譚嗣同; pinyin: Tán Sìtóng; Wade–Giles: T'an^{2} Ssu^{4}-T'ung^{2}, March 10, 1865 – September 28, 1898), courtesy name Fusheng (復生), art name Zhuangfei (壯飛), was a Chinese politician, thinker, and reformist of the late Qing dynasty. He was executed at the age of 33 when the Hundred Days' Reform failed in 1898. Tan Sitong was one of the six gentlemen of the Hundred Days' Reform, and occupies an important place in modern Chinese history. To many contemporaries, his execution symbolized the political failure of the Qing dynasty's reformation, helping to persuade the intellectual class to pursue violent revolution and overthrow the Qing dynasty.

== Early life ==
Tan Sitong was one of nine siblings and was born in Beijing, although his family originally came from Liuyang, Hunan Province. His father, Tan Jixun (谭继洵), was the governor of Hubei, and his mother, a traditional Chinese housewife named Xu Wuyuan (徐五缘), was very strict with her children.

Tan spent his childhood in Beijing and his youth in Liuyang. He began his formal education at 5 and was tutored by a famous scholar called Ouyang Zhonggu (歐陽中鴣) when he was 10. Although he was talented at essay writing, he objected to the conventional form of the essay that was required for examinations. As a result, he only achieved the title of "student member" (shengyuan; 生員), a very low educational level.

At the age of 12, Tan's mother, eldest brother, and second eldest sister died within a span of five days due to diphtheria that had spread during a visit to a cousin. He also fell gravely ill but recovered three days later, which many people deemed to be a miracle. After Tan lost his mother, his father's concubine treated him badly.

In 1879, Tan studied under another scholar, Xu Qixian (徐啟先), with whom he began a systematic study of representative works in Chinese, as well as natural science.

In 1884, he left his home and traveled to several different provinces of China, including Hebei, Gansu, Xinjiang, Shaanxi, Henan, Hubei, Jiangxi, Jiangsu, Anhui, Zhejiang, Shandong, and Shanxi. He composed more than 200 poems during the trip.

At the age of 19, Tan married a woman named Li Run (李闰) and had a son named Tan Lansheng (谭兰生), who died within a year of being born.

== Reforming campaign ==
=== Background ===
During the 19th century, the Qing dynasty faced a mounting series of crises. Chinese defeat in the First Opium War led to demoralizing foreign intervention, annexation and subjugation of China by Western powers, Russia, and Japan.

During this time, Chinese intellectuals and officials sought ways to improve Chinese life and national prospects.

In 1895, after a defeat by Japan in the First Sino-Japanese War, China was forced to sign the unequal Treaty of Shimonoseki, under which Taiwan was occupied and 250 million taels were paid to Japan. Astonished and indignant by the defeat, Tan realized the necessity of a thorough reformation in China, and he and his colleagues searched for new approaches to improve national standing. In 1896, he wrote the poem My Feelings (《有感》):

世間無物抵春愁，
合向蒼冥一哭休。
四萬萬人齊下淚，
天涯何處是神州？

In this world, nothing can dispel the sorrow of spring,
might as well let out a cry to the vast unknown and be done.
400 million people are shedding tears together,
where in the ends of the earth can our divine China be found?

Between 1896 and 1897, he finished writing a book called Ren Xue (仁学, Theory of Benevolence), which was considered to be the first philosophical work of the Reform. In the book, he said absolute monarchy greatly oppressed human nature. In 1898, he founded a new academy called the South Academy, which attempted to introduce Reformation ideals in southern China, specifically the Hunan district. He later created the newspaper Hunan Report (湘报) to publicize the advantage of reform policies.

=== Hundred Days Reform ===
Early in 1898, Tan was introduced to Emperor Guangxu, who was considering enacting reform policies. He was appointed a member of the Grand Council, and within two months the Hundred Days' Reform began with the issuing of an Imperial order titled Ming Ding Guo Shi (明定国是诏). Tan was the highest-ranking official involved in the Hundred Days' Reform.

Although the Guangxu emperor had nominally been ruler in his own right since 1889, his aunt and former regent, Empress Dowager Cixi, retained very substantial power in court. Conservative court officials rallied around Cixi in expressing their opposition to reform.

In September 1898, Tan and his counterparts thought the Dowager and conservative officials were planning to interfere with the Reformation campaign, and he visited general Yuan Shikai (袁世凯), in the hope that Yuan's army could support the Reformation Movement by murdering Ronglu (荣禄, a Manchu official who was in charge of the capital and its surrounding regions then) and imprisoning Cixi in the Summer Palace. After returning to Tianjin, Yuan immediately betrayed the Reform movement by divulging the conspiracy. Cixi was also informed that the reformists were trying to engage Itō Hirobumi (a Japanese politician and reformist who was touring in China) as a government consultant and provide him with a certain amount of power, which worried her significantly about the dynasty's stability.

As a result, Cixi returned to the Forbidden City from the Summer Palace on September 21 and led a coup, where she seized the throne power from Emperor Guangxu and ordered the arrest of all those involved in the Reformation. The short-lived Reformation Movement ended 103 days after it began and it has been known ever since as the Hundred Days' Reform. Emperor Guangxu was imprisoned at Ying Tai (a tiny island in the middle of a lake) in Zhongnanhai, allowing Cixi to absolutely consolidate her public standing and authority. All the Reformation policies were abolished except for Jing Shi Da Xue Tang (京师大学堂), the first government-established tertiary educational institution in China's history, which later on became Peking University.

Tan was arrested at the Guild Hall of Liuyang (浏阳会馆) in Beijing on September 24. Unlike reformers Kang Youwei and Liang Qichao, Tan had not fled to Japan. However, Tan refused to go with the reason that his sacrifice would serve as a catalyst for Reformation ideals among the nation. His words on this were as follows:

各國變法，無不從流血而成。今中國未聞有因變法而流血者，此國之所以不昌者也。有之，请從嗣同始。

Seen from the world, no successful reforms were made without bleeding. So far, within China, it has never been heard that anyone sacrificed his life to reform the nation, for which the country lacks prosperity. If there is anyone to be, just start from me.

After being captured, Tan was put in the Xing Bu Da Lao (刑部大牢), the jail belonging to the then-Ministry of Justice, and charged with treason and attempting a military coup. The legal inquiry process was interrupted by an abrupt order from the Emperor (effectively made by Cixi) calling for an immediate execution due to the severity of his crimes. Consequently, Tan was escorted to the Caishikou Execution Grounds outside Xuanwu Gate of Peking on the afternoon of September 28, 1898, where he was executed by beheading along with five others: Yang Shenxiu, Lin Xu, Liu Guangdi, Kang Guangren (younger brother of Kang Youwei), and Yang Rui. Historically, these men are called the six gentlemen of the Hundred Days' Reform. There were originally another two officials to be executed along with the six, Zhang Yinhuan and Xu Zhijing, but they survived the execution due to rescues by high-ranked officials and foreign interventions.

Tan's last words on the execution ground are well known in China, translated as follows:

有心杀贼，无力回天。死得其所，快哉! 快哉!

Eager to kill the oppressors, powerless to turn the tide. To die where one should, how exhilarating, how exhilarating!

== Death and legacy ==
After the execution, Tan's remains were collected and stored by some of his friends. In 1899, the remains were sent to and buried in his hometown, Liuyang, Hunan. His father, despite his disagreement with his son's reform efforts, was stripped of all official duties, and returned to his hometown, where he died three years later. Tan's wife, Li Run (李闰), became active in promoting girls' education and also volunteered as a foster mother in Hunan in her later years. She died in 1925, 14 years after the collapse of the Qing dynasty and 27 years after her husband's death.

== See also ==
- Former Residence of Tan Sitong
- Lin Xu
- Tang Caichang
