= Tang Caichang =

Politician and revolutionary

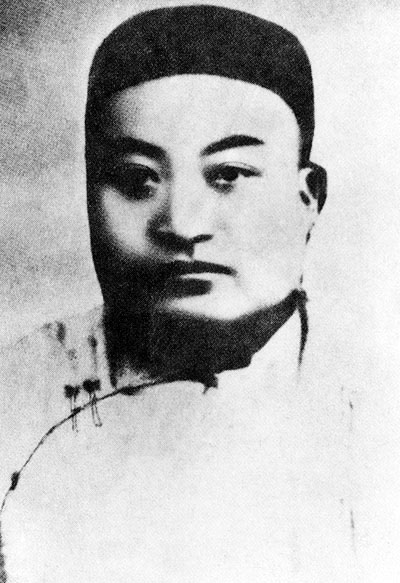
- Born: 1867; Liuyang, Hunan, Qing Empire
- Died: 1900 (aged 32–33); Hankou, Hunan, Qing dynasty
- Known for: Leader in the Tang Caichang's uprising
- Children: 15 children
- Relatives: Tang Youren (third son)

Tang Caichang (Chinese: 唐才常; pinyin: Táng Cáicháng; 1867 – 22 August 1900) was a late Qing dynasty revolutionary and political activist. He and fellow reformer Tan Sitong were from Liuyang. Tang was chosen by Kang Youwei to lead an uprising in Hankou, however he and thirty others were arrested by Qing forces before it ever began on August 21, 1900. By order of Zhang Zhidong, then Viceroy of Huguang, he was beheaded the following day in Wuchang. He is considered by the Chinese to be a martyr for revolution.

Tang was one of the chief proponents of the Social Darwinist-rooted ideas of race in contemporary China. He postulated that humankind was divided into the four main races: yellow, white, red, and black. According to Tang's views, the yellow and white races were inherently superior to the red and black ones and crossbreeding with superior races was a way to improve the race (Chinese: 進種; pinyin: jinzhong). Tang also stated that the origins of humanity could be traced specifically to China.

== See also ==
- Tan Sitong
- Kang Youwei
- Sun Yat-sen
- Hundred Days' Reform
- Wuchang uprising
