= Houguan =

Houguan may refer to:

- Guan (instrument), a Chinese double reed wind instrument
- Houguan, Hebei (侯贯), a town in Wei County, Xingtai, Hebei, China
- Houguan county (侯官), a former county near Fuzhou, Fujian, China
