= Caishi Kou station =

Beijing Subway interchange station

Caishi Kou 菜市口
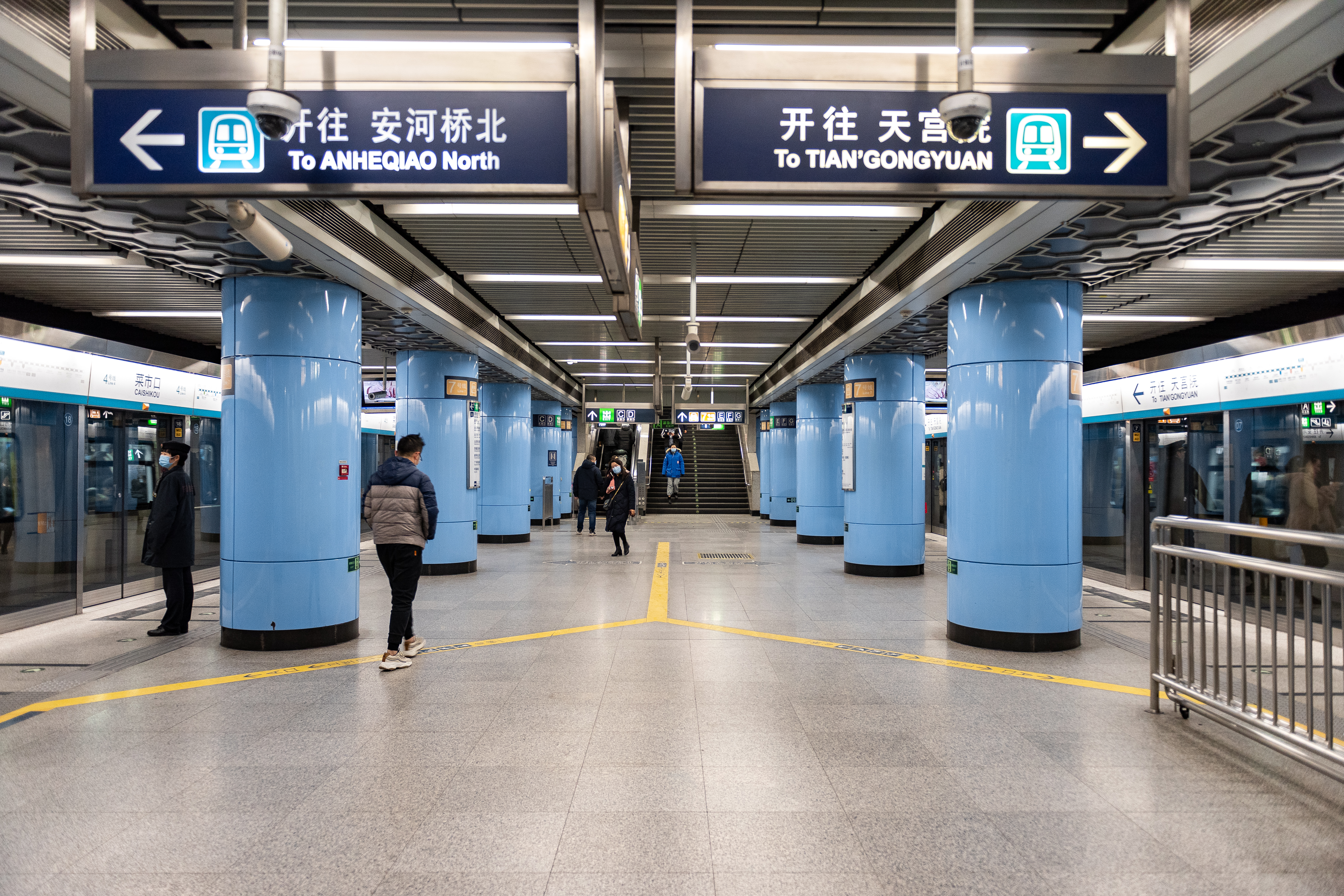
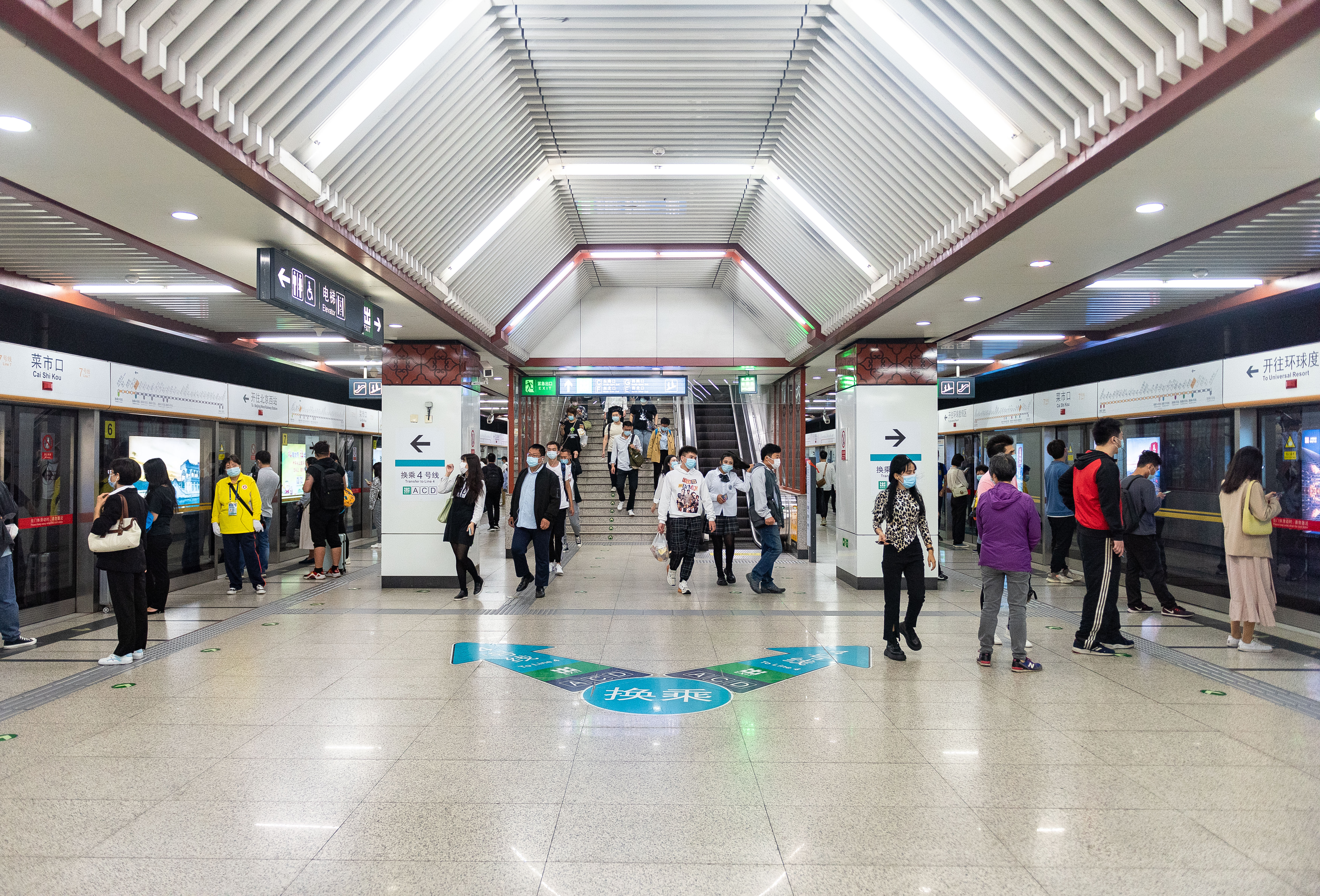
- Line 4 platform Line 7 platform

General information
- Location: Caishikou, Xicheng District, Beijing; China
- Coordinates: 39.889296°N 116.374425°E
- Operator: Beijing MTR Corporation Limited (Line 4); Beijing Mass Transit Railway Operation Corporation Limited (Line 7)
- Lines: Line 4; Line 7
- Platforms: 4 (2 island platforms)
- Tracks: 4

Construction
- Structure type: Underground
- Accessible: Yes

History
- Opened: September 28, 2009; 16 years ago (Line 4); December 28, 2014; 11 years ago (Line 7)

Services
Preceding station	Beijing Subway	Following station
Xuanwu Men towards Anheqiaobei	Line 4	Taoranting towards Tiangong Yuan
Guang'anmen Nei towards Beijing West railway station	Line 7	Hufangqiao towards Universal Resort
Location
- Location within Beijing

Caishi Kou Station (Chinese: 菜市口站; pinyin: Càishì Kǒu Zhàn) is an interchange subway station between Line 4 and Line 7 of the Beijing Subway. Line 4 station opened in September 2009, together with the other stations on the line. It is located in the Caishikou neighbourhood of the Xicheng District.

== Around the station ==
- Niujie Mosque located on Niujie
- Caishikou Execution Grounds

== First and last time ==
- Beijing West Railway Station — Hua zhuang
  - The first train 5:39
  - The last train 23:24
- Hua zhuang — Beijing West Railway Station
  - The first train 5:43
  - The last train 22:58

== Station layout ==
Both the line 4 and 7 stations have underground island platforms.

== Exits ==
There are 6 exits, lettered A, C, D, E, F, and G. Exits A, E, and G are accessible.

== Gallery ==
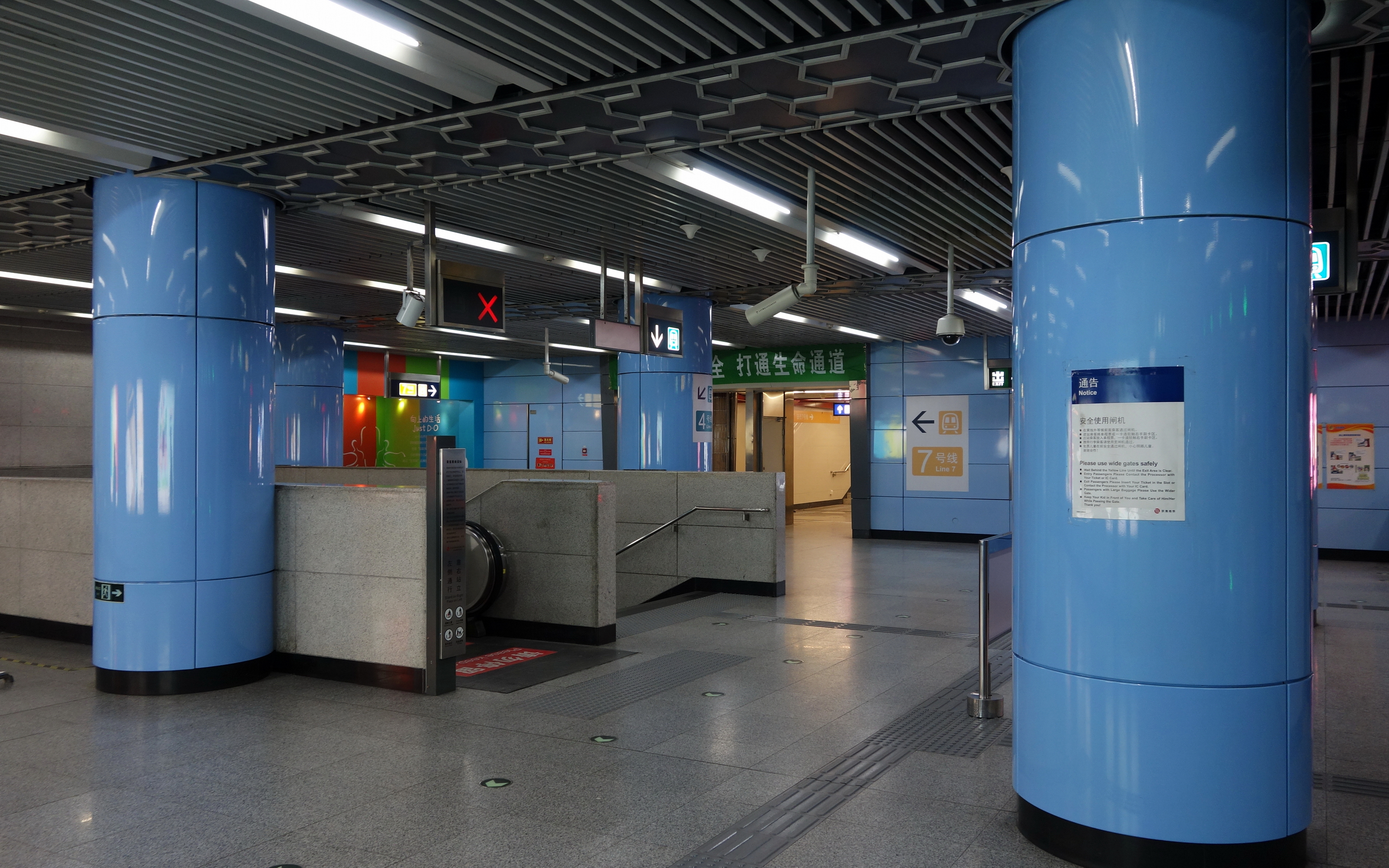
Line 4 concourse (November 2015)

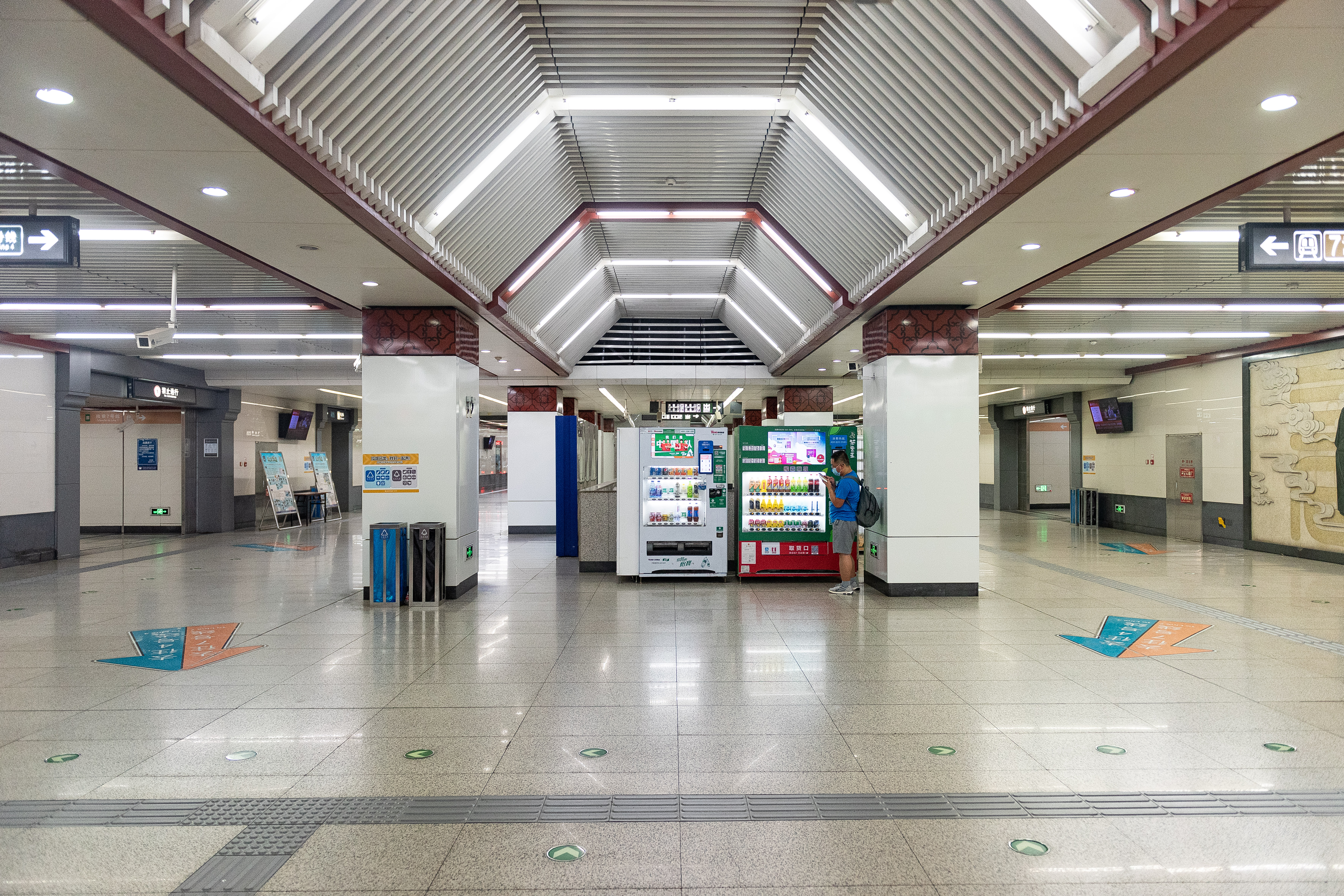
Line 7 concourse

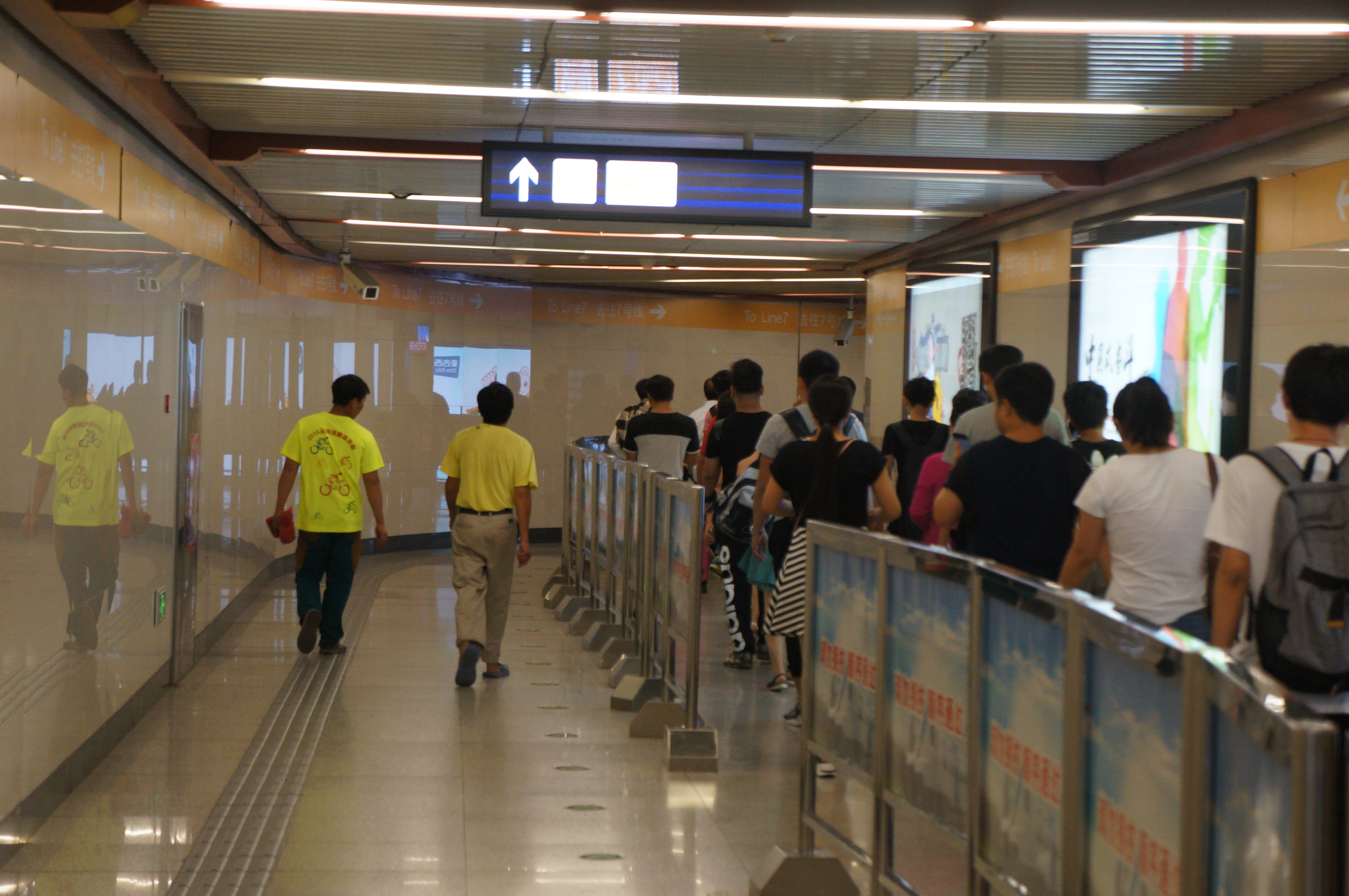
Interchange corridor (June 2016)

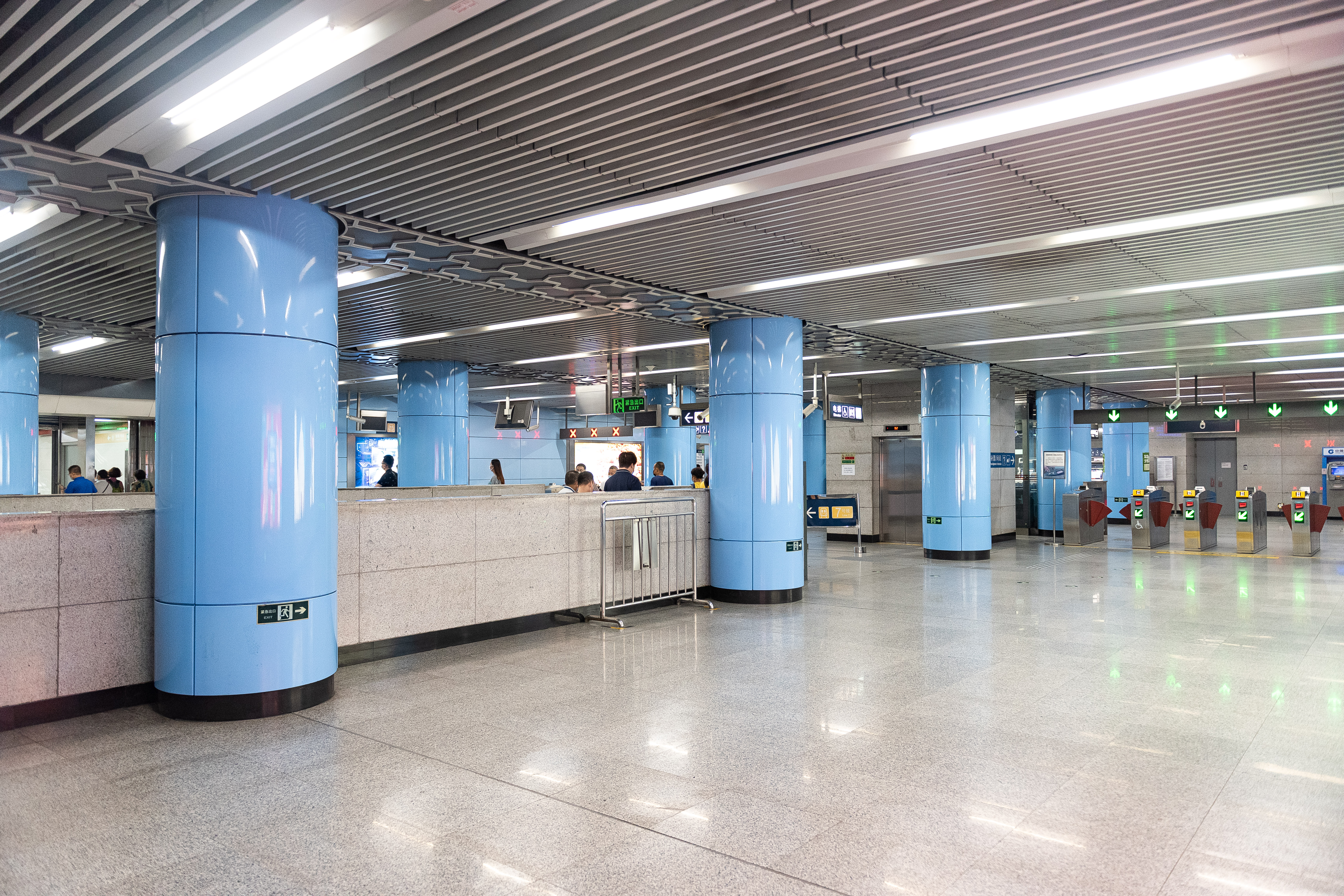
Line 4 north concourse

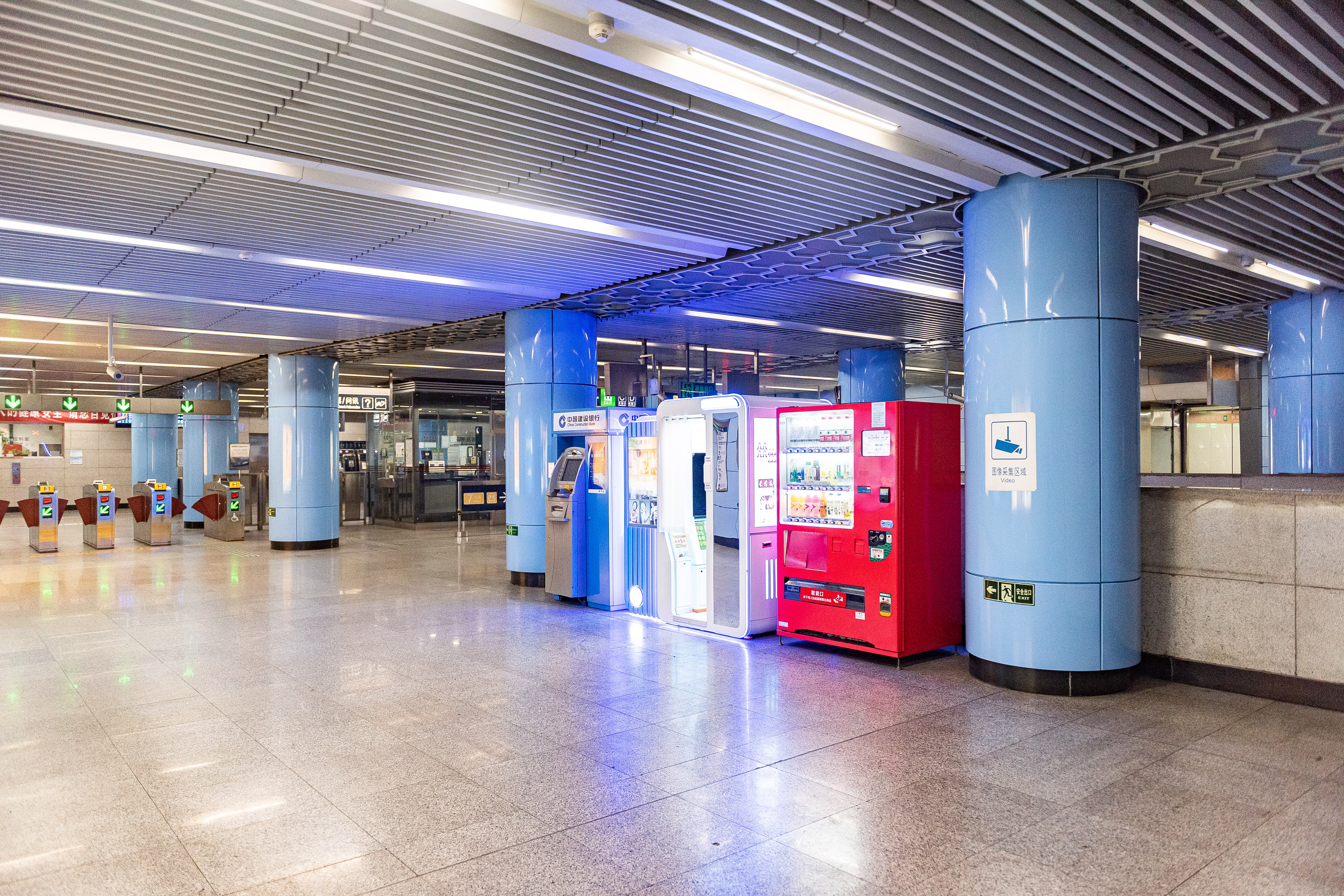
Line 4 south concourse

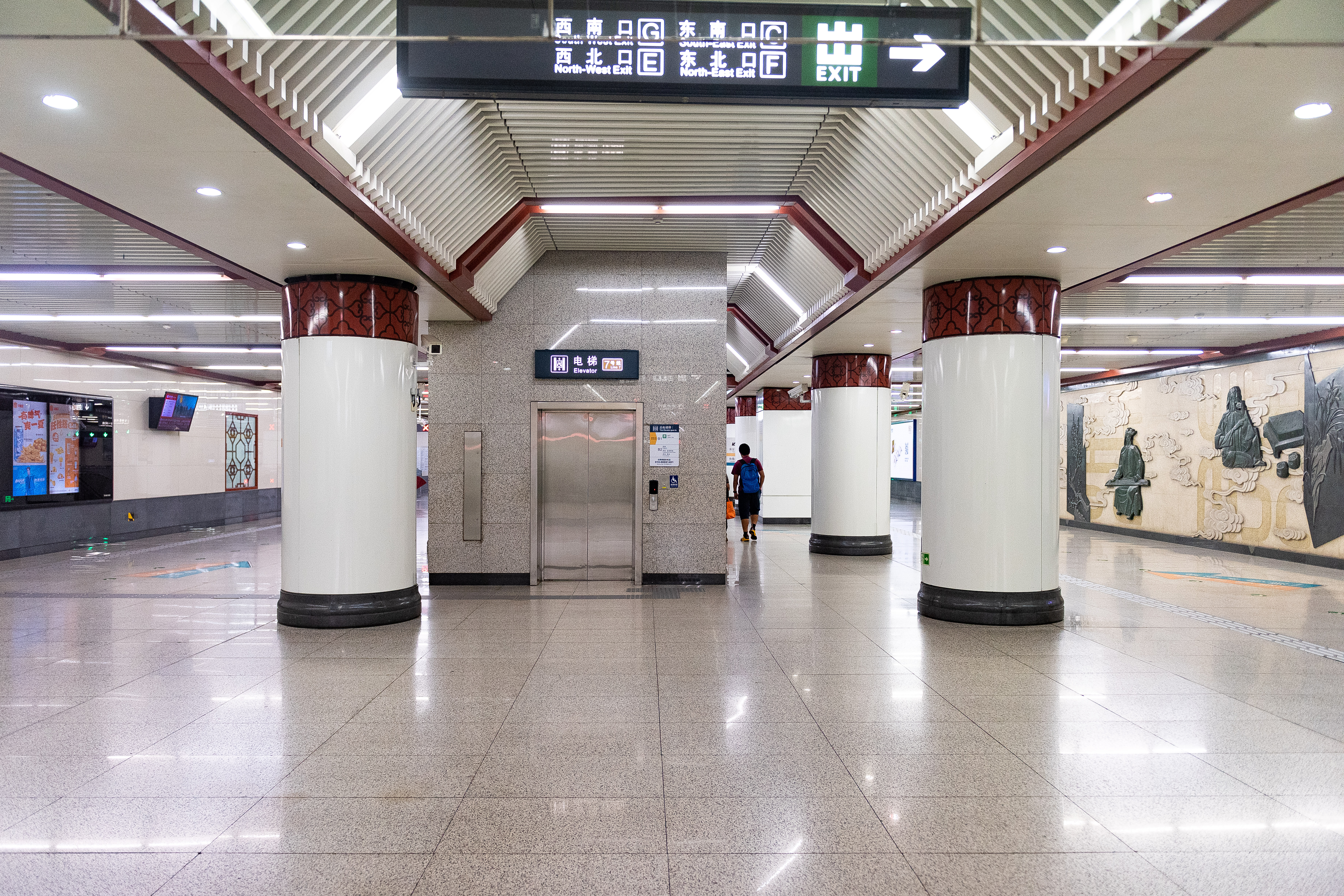
Line 7 concourse
