= Wanzi station =

Beijing Subway station

Wanzi 湾子
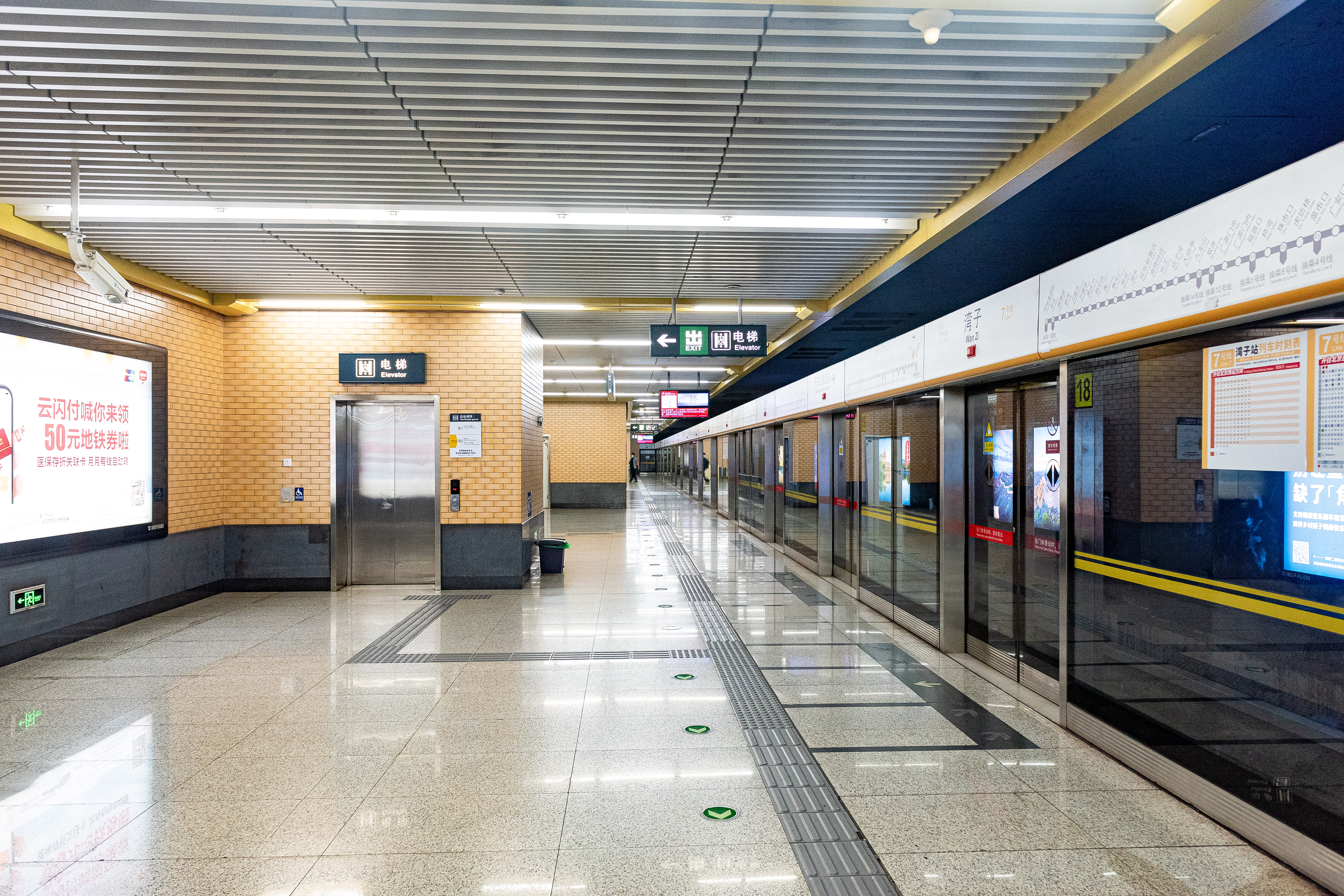
- Westbound platform

General information
- Location: Guang'anmen Outer Street; Xicheng District, Beijing; China
- Coordinates: 39.888606°N 116.321708°E
- Operator: Beijing Mass Transit Railway Operation Corporation Limited
- Line: Line 7
- Platforms: 2 (2 side platforms)
- Tracks: 2

Construction
- Structure type: Underground
- Accessible: Yes

History
- Opened: December 28, 2014

Services
Preceding station	Beijing Subway	Following station
Beijing West railway station Terminus	Line 7	Daguanying towards Universal Resort
Location
- Location within Beijing

Wanzi Station (simplified Chinese: 湾子站; traditional Chinese: 灣子站; pinyin: Wānzǐ Zhàn) is a station on Line 7 of the Beijing Subway. It was opened on December 28, 2014 as a part of the stretch between Beijing West railway station and Jiaohuachang and is located between Beijing West railway station and Daguanying.

== First and last time ==
- Beijing West Railway Station — Hua Zhuang
  - The first train 5:32
  - The last train 23:17
- Hua Zhuang — Beijing West Railway Station
  - The first train 5:52
  - The last train 23:36

== Station layout ==
The station has 2 underground side platforms.

== Exits ==
There are 3 exits, lettered A, C, and D. Exits A and C are accessible.
