= Taoranting station =

Beijing Subway station

Taoranting 陶然亭
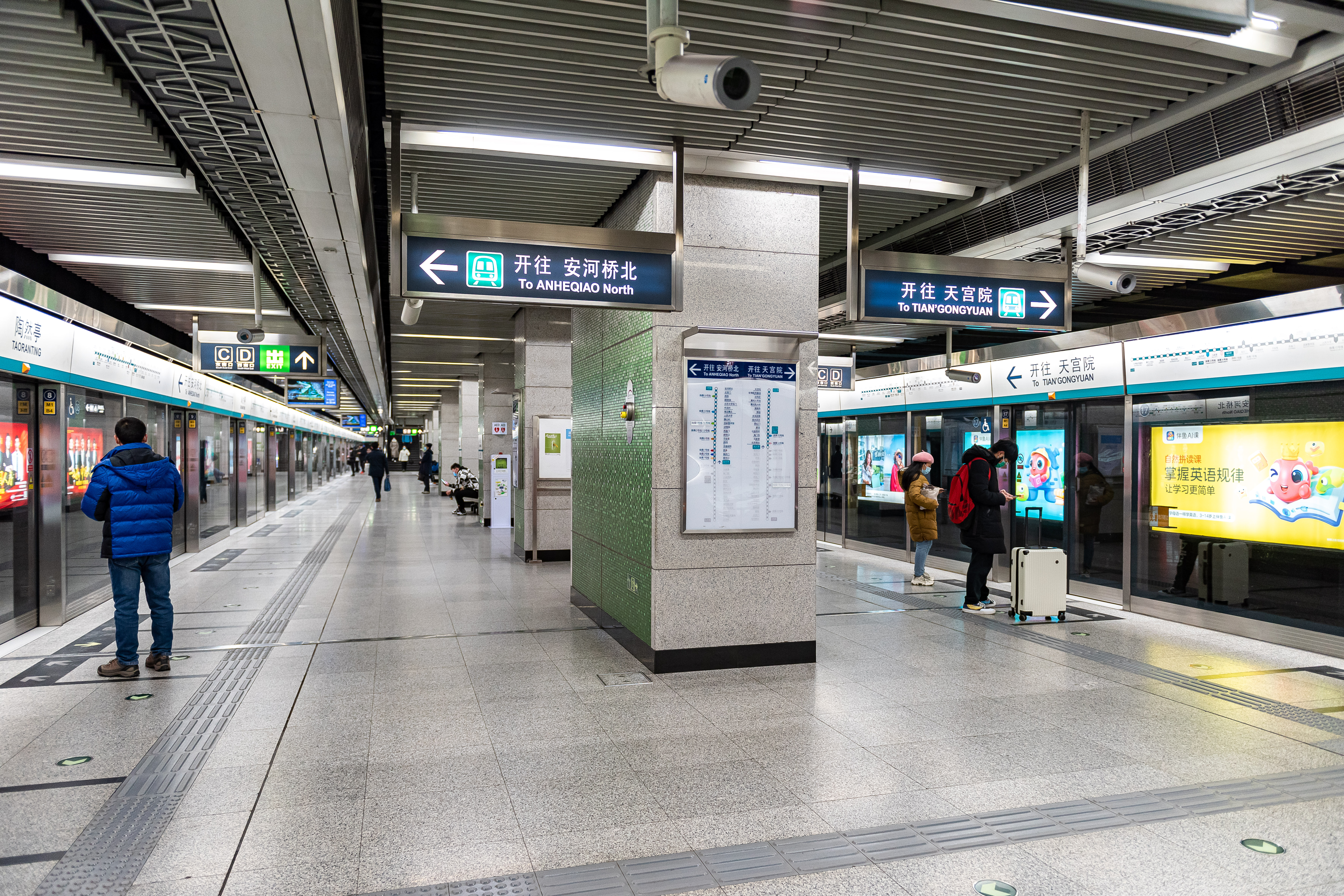
- Platform in January 2021

General information
- Location: Caishikou Street; Xicheng District, Beijing; China
- Coordinates: 39.8771°N 116.3682°E
- Operator: Beijing MTR Corporation Limited
- Line: Line 4
- Platforms: 2 (1 island platform)
- Tracks: 2

Construction
- Structure type: Underground
- Accessible: Yes

History
- Opened: September 28, 2009; 16 years ago

Services
Preceding station	Beijing Subway	Following station
Caishi Kou towards Anheqiaobei	Line 4	Beijing South railway station towards Tiangong Yuan
Location
- Location within Beijing

Taoranting Station (Chinese: 陶然亭站; pinyin: Táorántíng Zhàn) is a subway station on Line 4 of the Beijing Subway.

== Station layout ==
The station has an underground island platform.

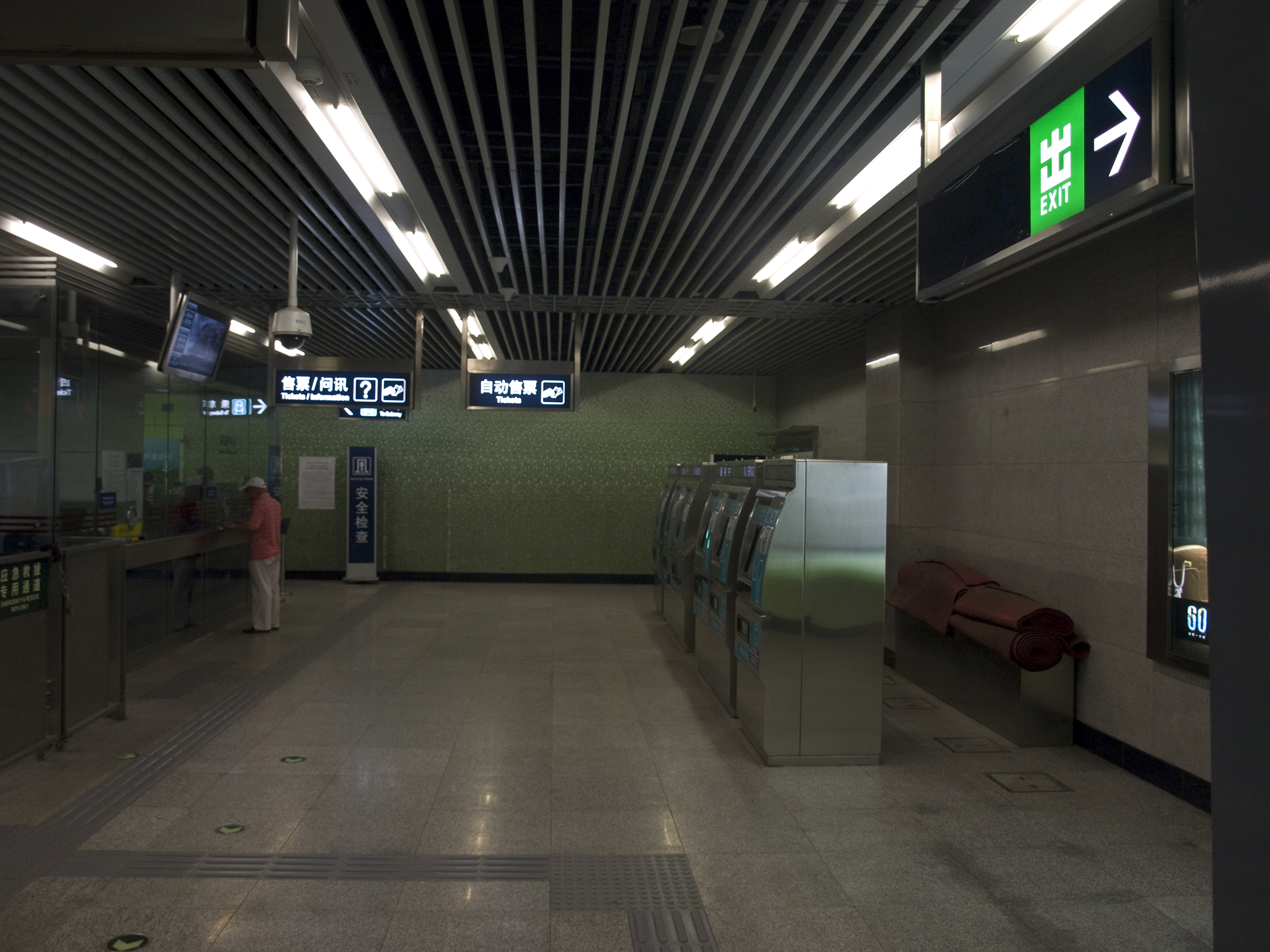
Entrance to the station

== Exits ==
There are 3 exits, lettered A, C, and D. Exit A is accessible.
