= Guang'anmennei station =

Beijing Subway station

Guang'anmen Nei 广安门内
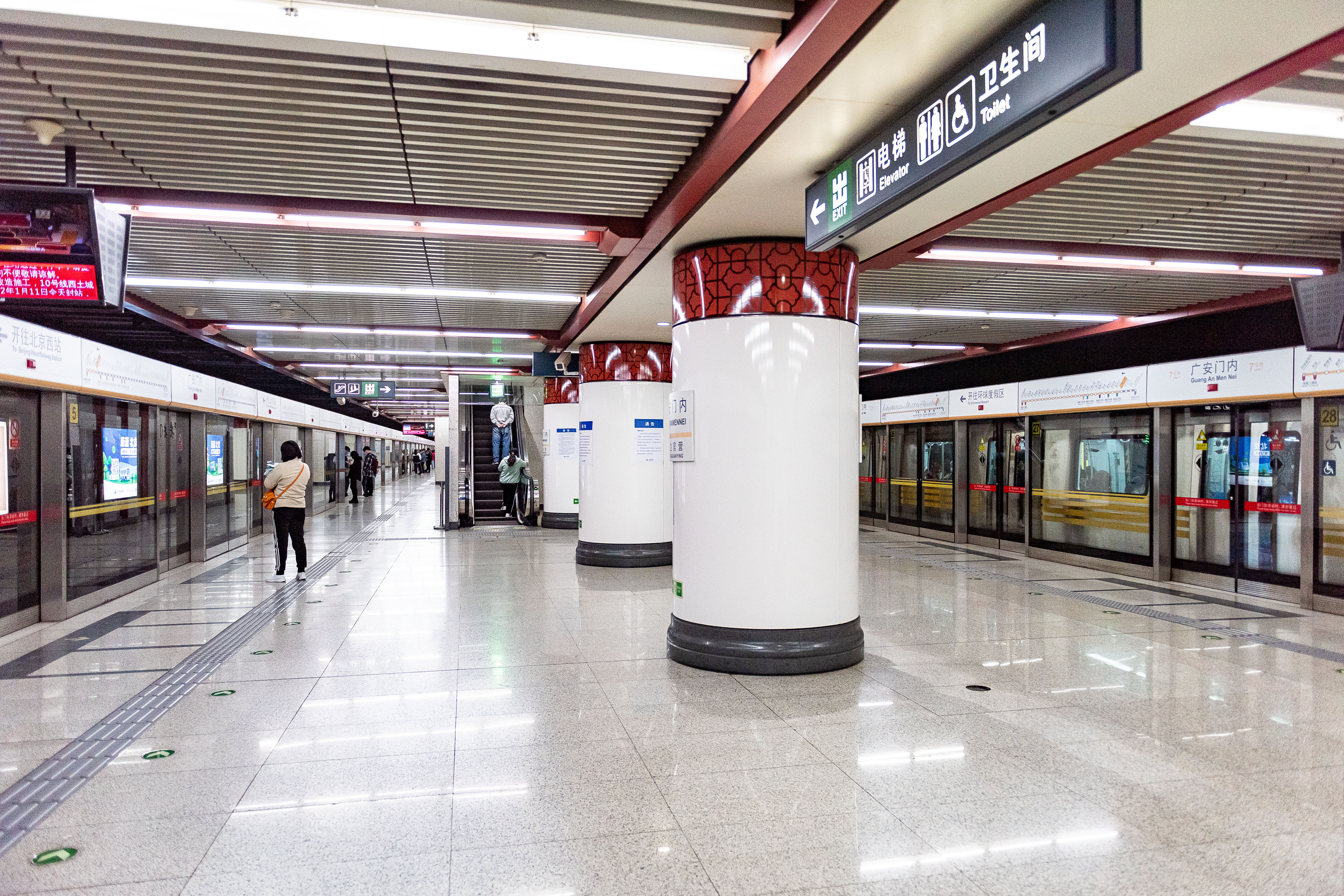
- Platform

General information
- Location: Guang'anmen Inner Street; Guang'anmennei Subdistrict, Xicheng District, Beijing; China
- Coordinates: 39.8894°N 116.3574°E
- Operator: Beijing Mass Transit Railway Operation Corporation Limited
- Line: Line 7
- Platforms: 2 (1 island platform)
- Tracks: 2
- Connections: Line 19 (OSI via Niujie)

Construction
- Structure type: Underground
- Accessible: Yes

History
- Opened: December 28, 2014; 11 years ago

Services
Preceding station	Beijing Subway	Following station
Daguanying towards Beijing West railway station	Line 7	Caishi Kou towards Universal Resort
Location
- Location within Beijing

Guang'anmen Nei Station (simplified Chinese: 广安门内站; traditional Chinese: 廣安門內站; pinyin: Guǎng'ānmén Nèi Zhàn) is a station on Line 7 of the Beijing Subway. It was opened on December 28, 2014 as a part of the stretch between Beijing West railway station and Jiaohua Chang and is located between Daguanying and Caishi Kou.

== Station layout ==
The station has an underground island platform.

== Exits ==
There are 3 exits, lettered A, B, and C2. Exits B and C2 are accessible.
