= Daguanying station =

Beijing Subway Line 7 and Line 16 station

Daguanying 达官营
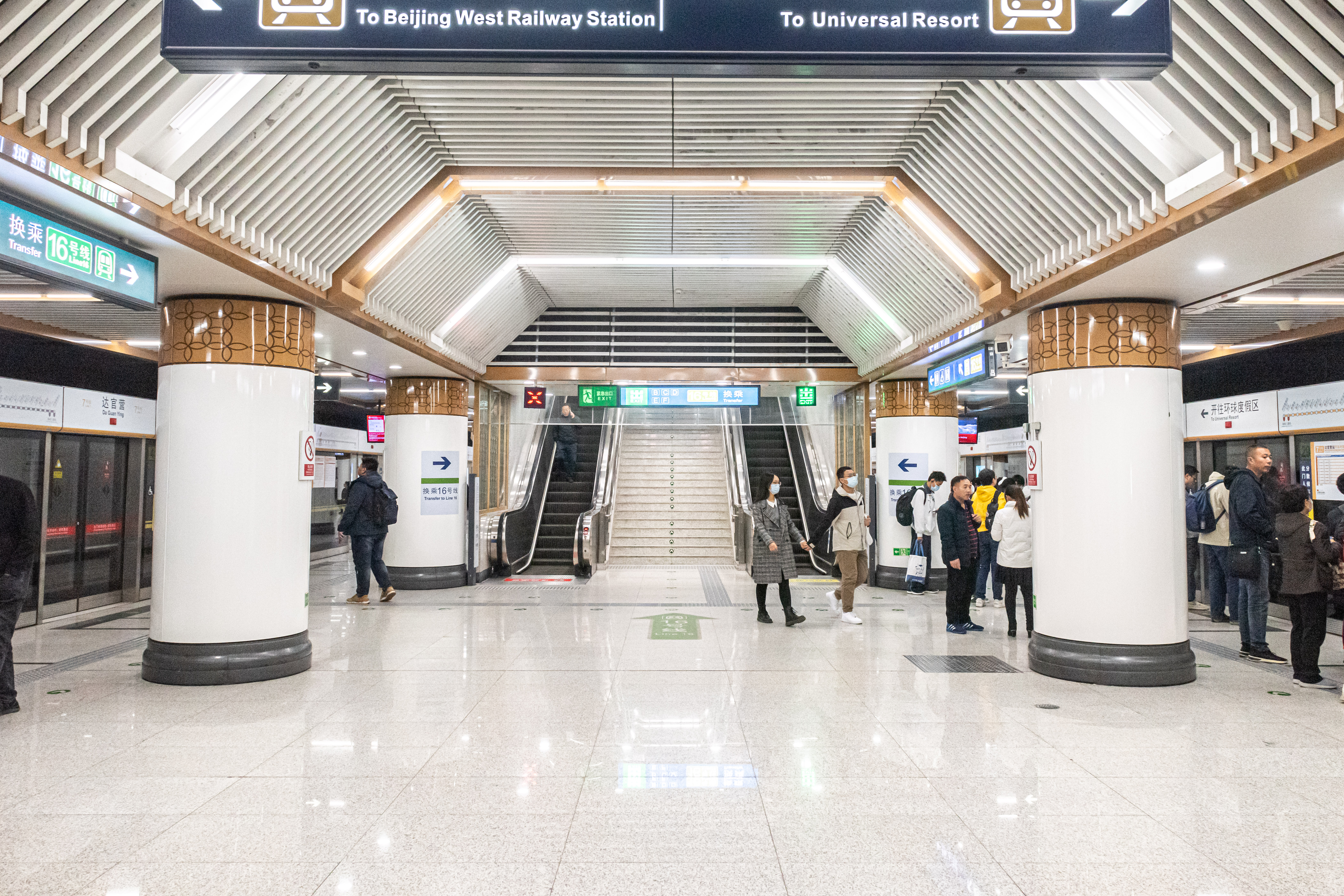
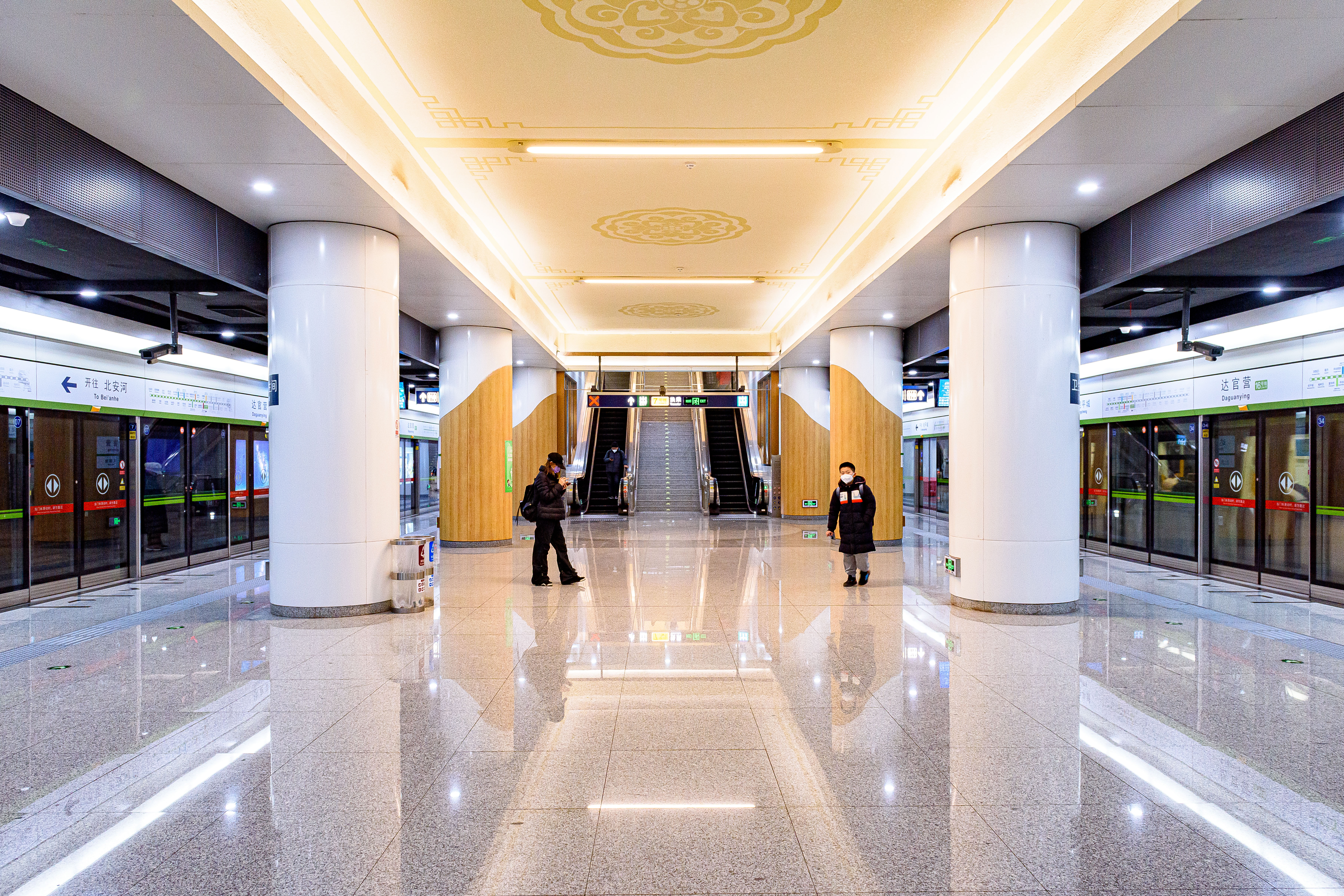
- Line 7 platform Line 16 platform

General information
- Location: Guang'anmen Outer Street; Guang'anmenwai Subdistrict, Xicheng District, Beijing; China
- Coordinates: 39.888535°N 116.330051°E
- Operator: Beijing Mass Transit Railway Operation Corporation Limited
- Lines: Line 7; Line 16
- Platforms: 4 (2 island platforms)
- Tracks: 4

Construction
- Structure type: Underground
- Accessible: Yes

History
- Opened: Line 7: December 28, 2014; 11 years ago; Line 16: December 31, 2022; 3 years ago

Services
Preceding station	Beijing Subway	Following station
Wanzi towards Beijing West railway station	Line 7	Guang'anmen Nei towards Universal Resort
Muxidi towards Bei'anhe	Line 16	Honglian Nanlu towards Wanpingcheng
Location
- Location within Beijing

Daguanying Station (simplified Chinese: 达官营站; traditional Chinese: 達官營站; pinyin: Dáguānyíng Zhàn) is an interchange station on Line 7 and Line 16 of the Beijing Subway. Line 7 opened on December 28, 2014 as a part of the stretch between Beijing West railway station and Jiaohuachang and is located between Wanzi and Guang'anmennei. Line 16 opened on December 31, 2022.

== Station layout ==
Both the line 7 and line 16 stations have an underground island platforms. There are 5 exits, lettered B, C, D, E and F. Exits B and C are accessible via elevators.

== Gallery ==
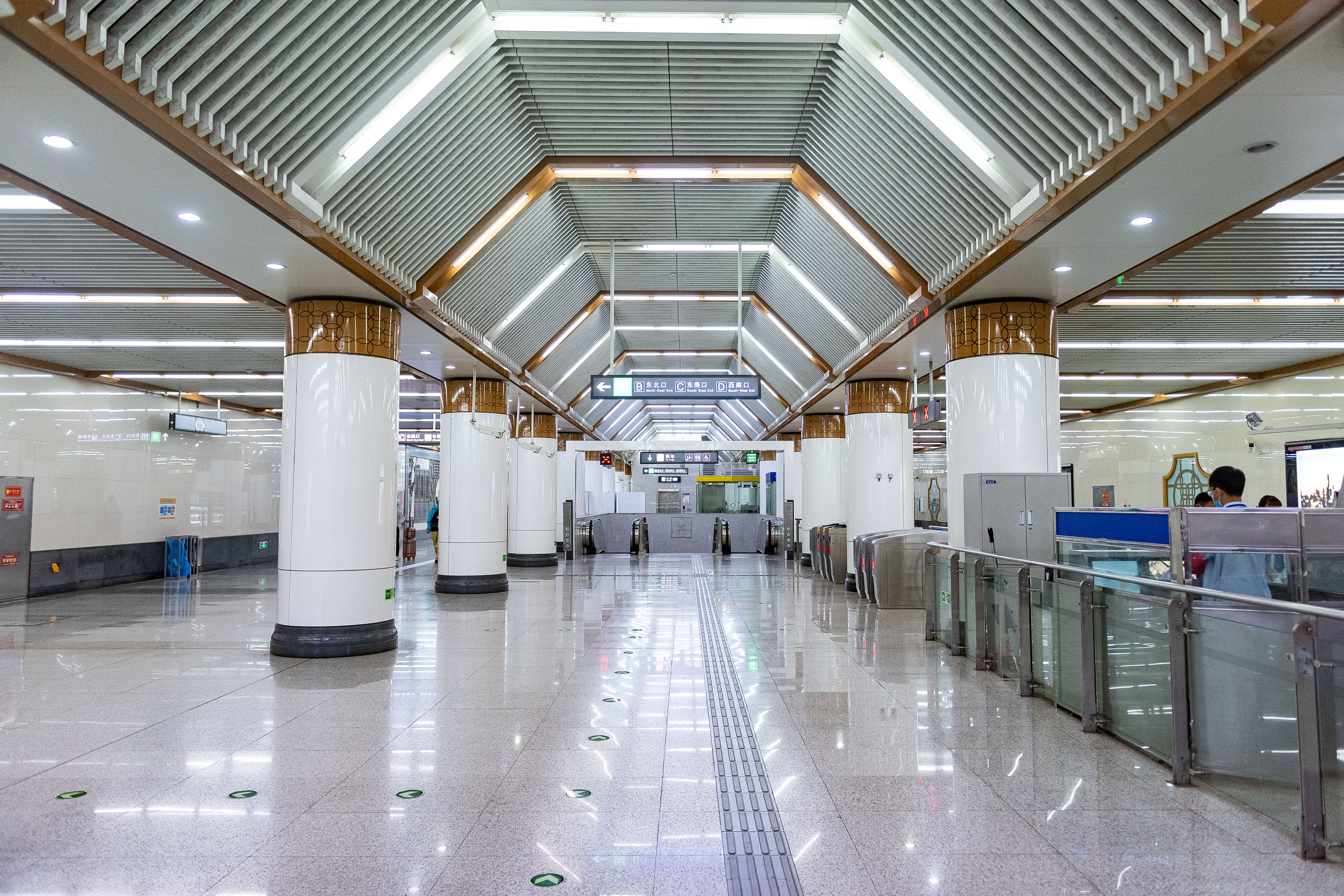
Line 7 concourse (June 2021)

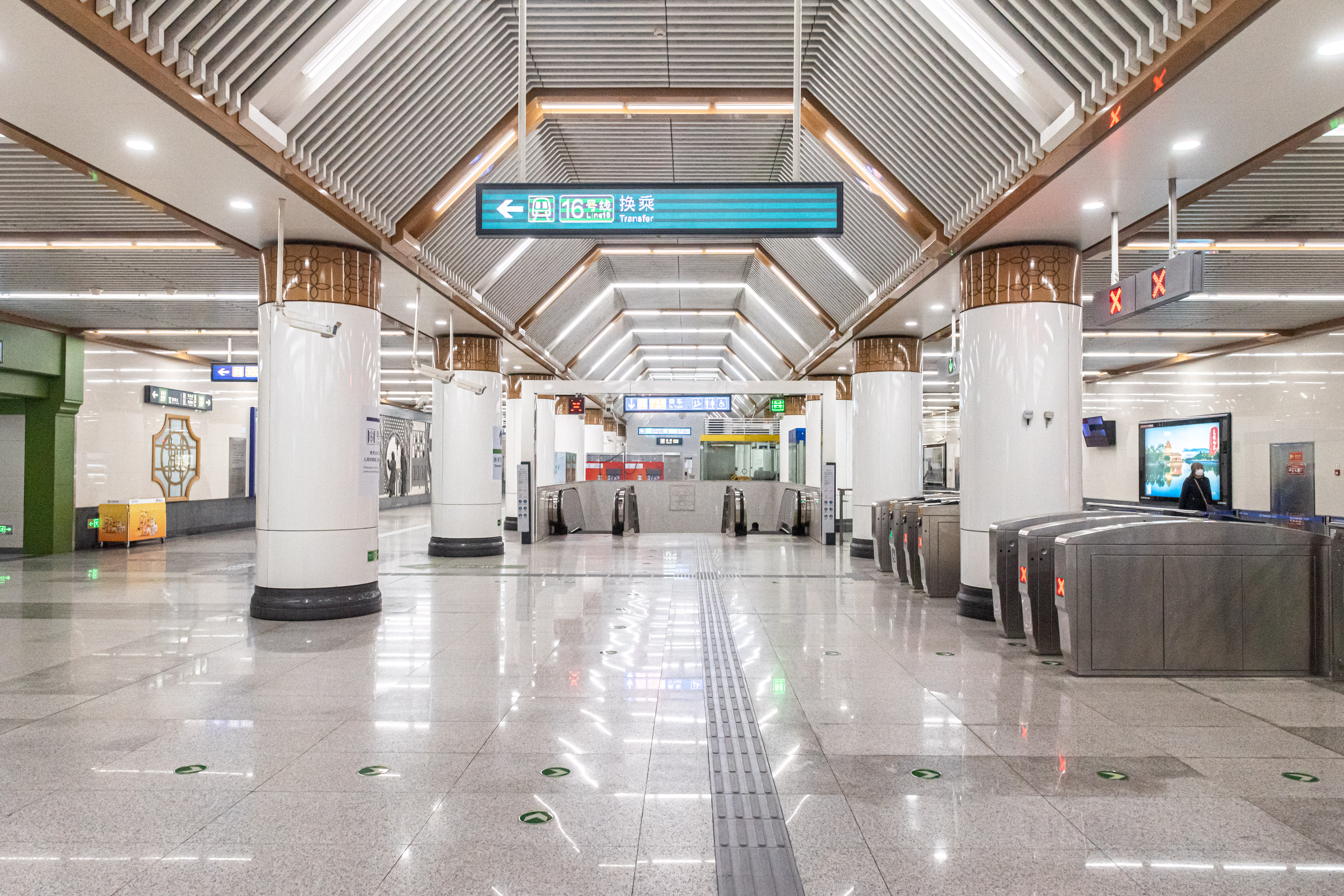
Line 7 concourse (November 2023)

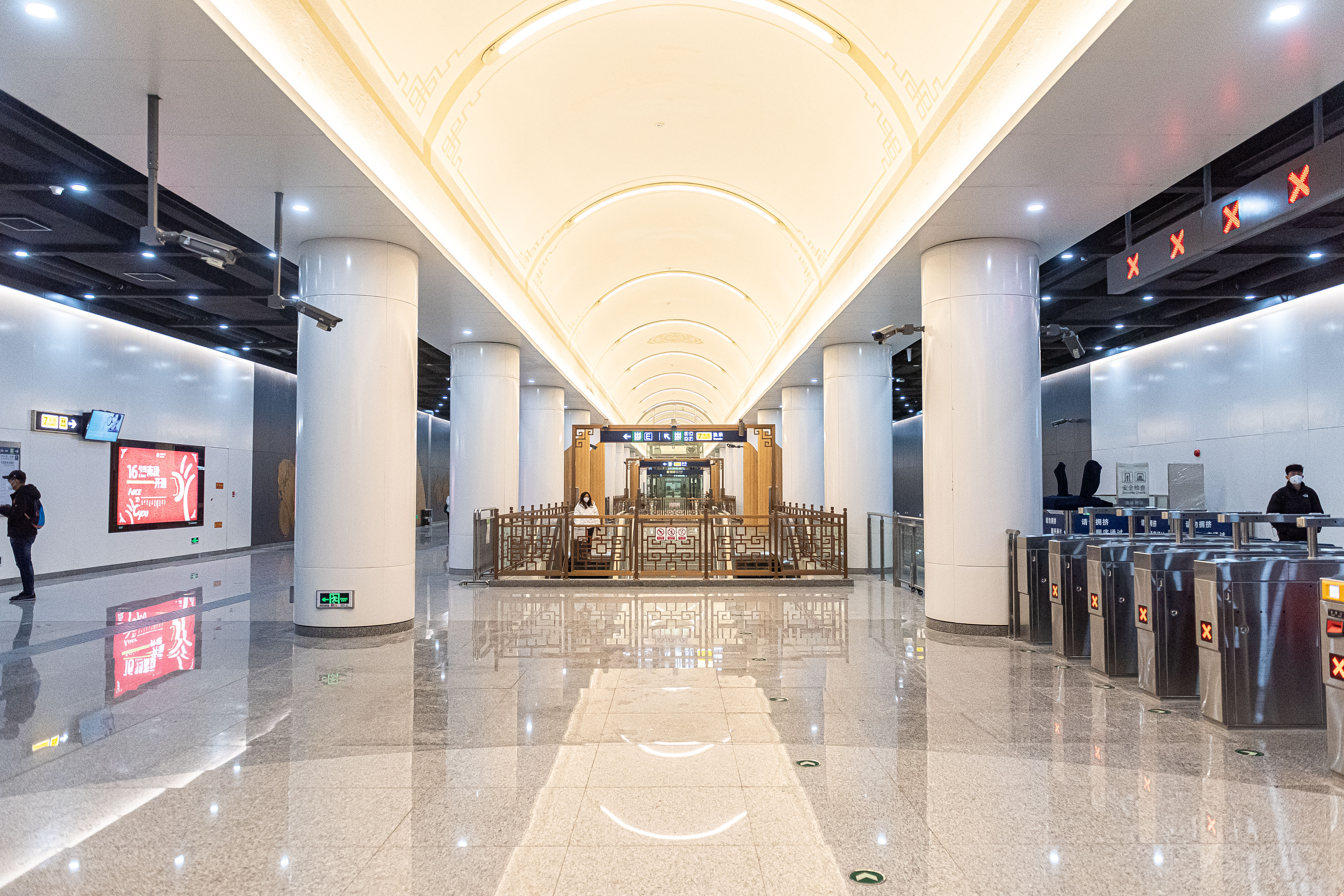
Line 16 concourse (December 2022)
