= Honglian Nanlu station =

Beijing Subway Line 16 station

Honglian Nanlu 红莲南路
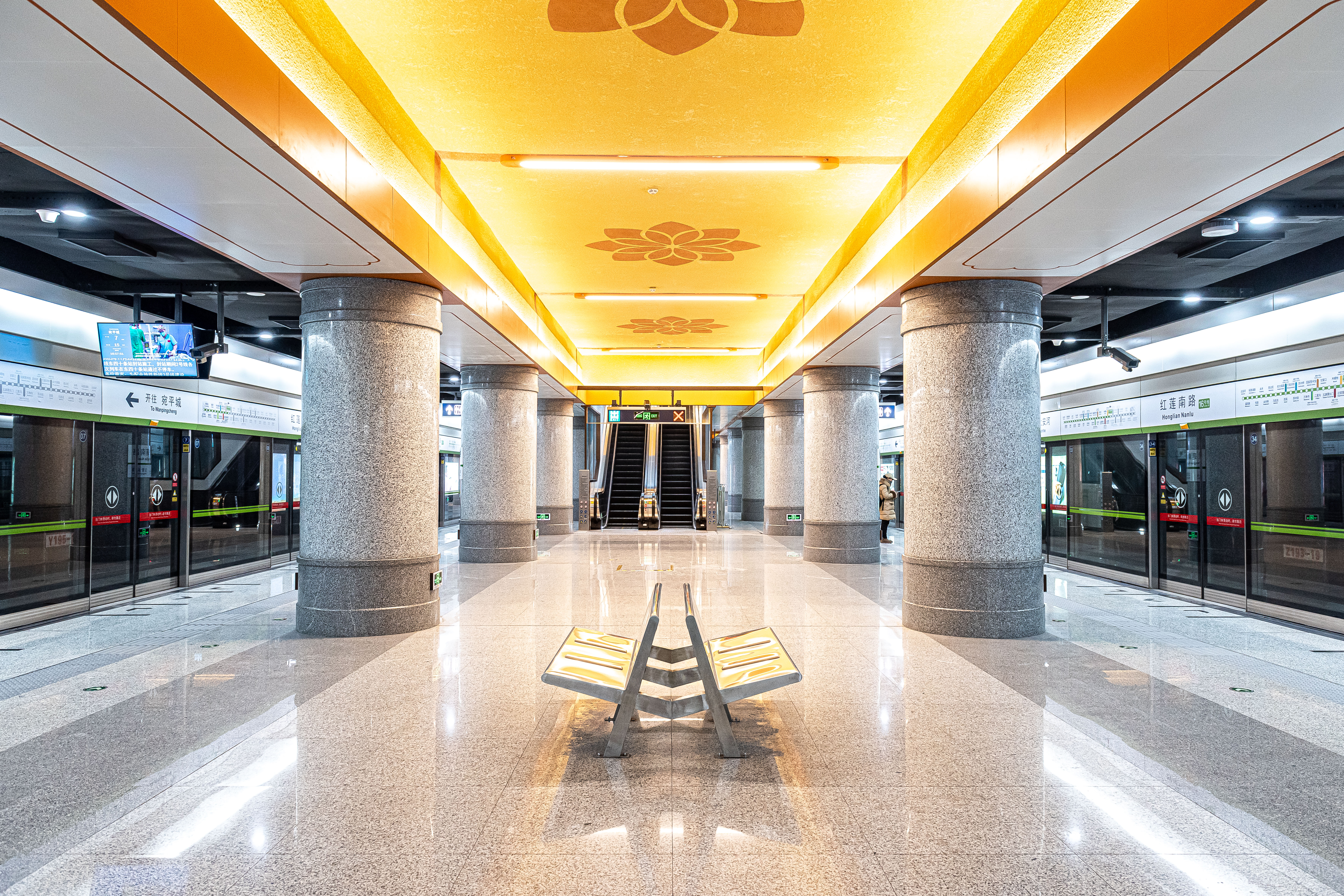
- Platform

General information
- Location: Intersection of Lianhuahe East Road and Honglian South Road, Xicheng District; China
- Coordinates: 39°52′35″N 116°19′51″E
- Operator: Beijing MTR Metro Line 16 Corp., Ltd.
- Line: Line 16
- Platforms: 2 (1 island platform)
- Tracks: 2

Construction
- Structure type: Underground
- Accessible: Yes

History
- Opened: December 31, 2022; 3 years ago

Services
Preceding station	Beijing Subway	Following station
Daguanying towards Bei'anhe	Line 16	Lize Shangwuqu towards Wanpingcheng
Location

Honglian Nanlu station (Chinese: 红莲南路站; pinyin: Hónglián Nánlù zhàn; lit. 'Honglian South Road station') is a station on Line 16 of the Beijing Subway. The station opened on 31 December 2022.

== Station layout ==
The station has an underground island platform. There are 4 exits, lettered A, B, C and D. Exit B is accessible via an elevator.

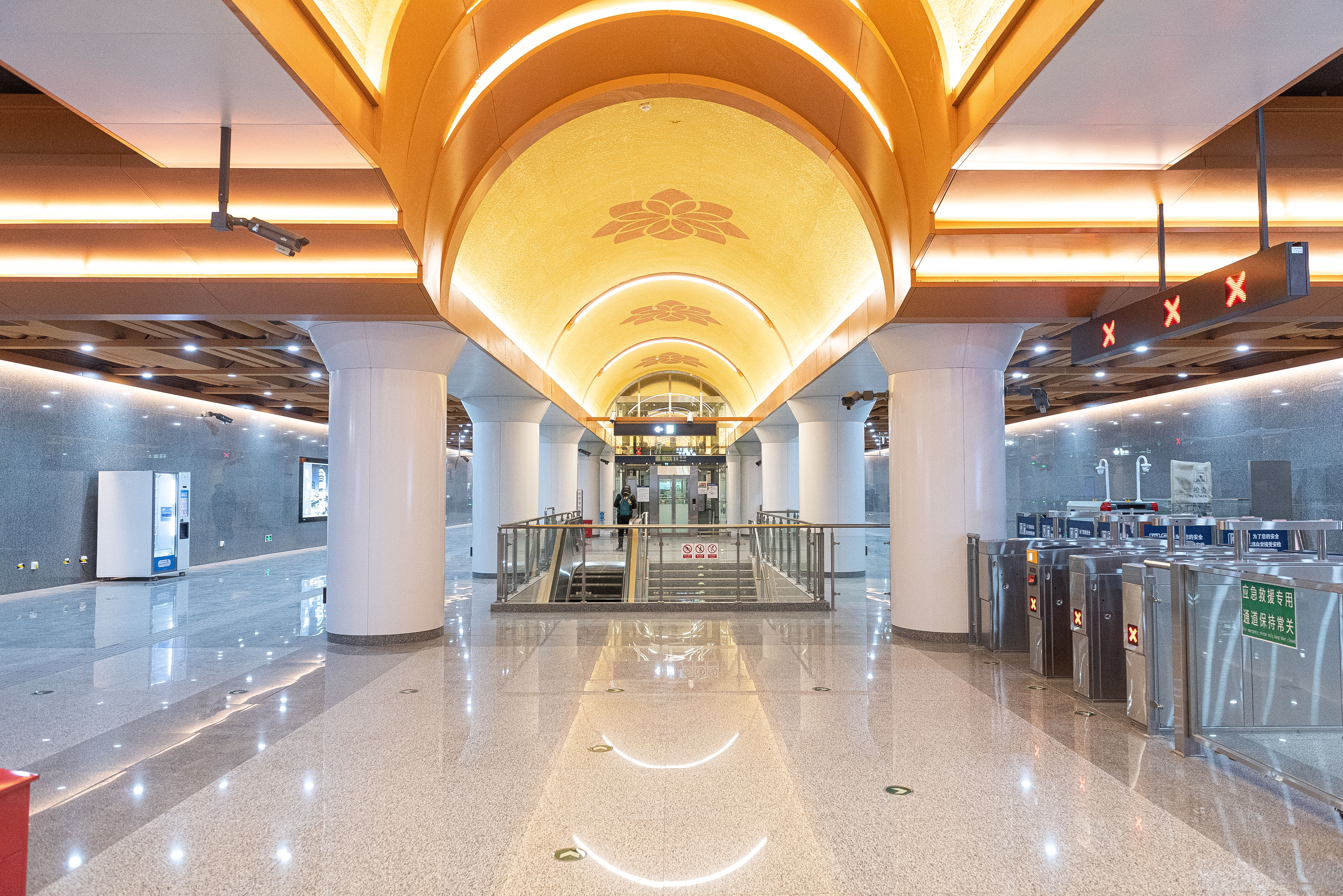
Concourse
