= Six gentlemen of the Hundred Days' Reform =

Chinese intellectuals executed in 1898

Six Gentlemen of Wuxu
- Chinese: 戊戌六君子
- Members: Tan Sitong; Lin Xu; Yang Rui; Yang Shenxiu; Liu Guangdi; Kang Guangren
- Beheaded in the order: Kang Guangren; Tan Sitong; Lin Xu; Yang Shenxiu; Yang Rui; Liu Guangdi

Six gentlemen of the Hundred Days' Reform (Chinese: 戊戌六君子; pinyin: Wùxū liù jūnzǐ), also known as Six gentlemen of Wuxu, were a group of six Chinese intellectuals whom the Empress Dowager Cixi had arrested and executed for their attempts to implement the Hundred Days' Reform. The most vocal and prominent member in the group of six was Tan Sitong. Kang Guangren was notable as the younger brother of the reformist leader Kang Youwei. These executions were a part of the large purge in which about 30 men were arrested, imprisoned, dismissed from office, or banished. In many cases the family members of these men were arrested as well.

On September 21, 1898, after growing intolerance of the Guangxu Emperor's hundred days' reform, Cixi and Ronglu successfully attempted a coup d'état in which all substantive power was taken from the Guangxu Emperor and assumed by Cixi, and the six reformers influencing Guangxu were arrested. The traditional view is that Cixi was the main instigator of these executions. However, evidence has surfaced that the conservative "Iron Hat" faction might have threatened her by having a Chinese-Muslim army close to Beijing.

== Beheaded ==
The six gentlemen stood trial on 28 September 1898 and were beheaded at Caishikou in Beijing on the same day without being tried by the Ministry of Justice.

However, biographer Jung Chang noted that Empress Dowager's action was also motivated by the assassination threat toward her. Yang Rui was said to be innocent, but four of the six were among the conspirators, including Yang Shenxiu who proposed the plan to infiltrate Cixi's resident. The assassination plan was concealed for a long time until the testimony of the man named Bi, who was ordered to kill Cixi but managed to escape, was revealing the plot to kill Cixi. The testimony was found in Japanese archives in the 1980s. Kang Youwei managed to escape to Japan, and he also spread stories to vilify Cixi. Jung Chang wrote that Kang Youwei was a "master propagandist".

The six were beheaded in the following order: Kang Guangren (康广仁), Tan Sitong, Lin Xu, Yang Shenxiu (杨深秀), Yang Rui (杨锐), and Liu Guangdi.

== See also ==
- Gongche Shangshu movement
- May Fourth Movement
