= Lin Xu =

Chinese politician (1875–1898)

- 林旭
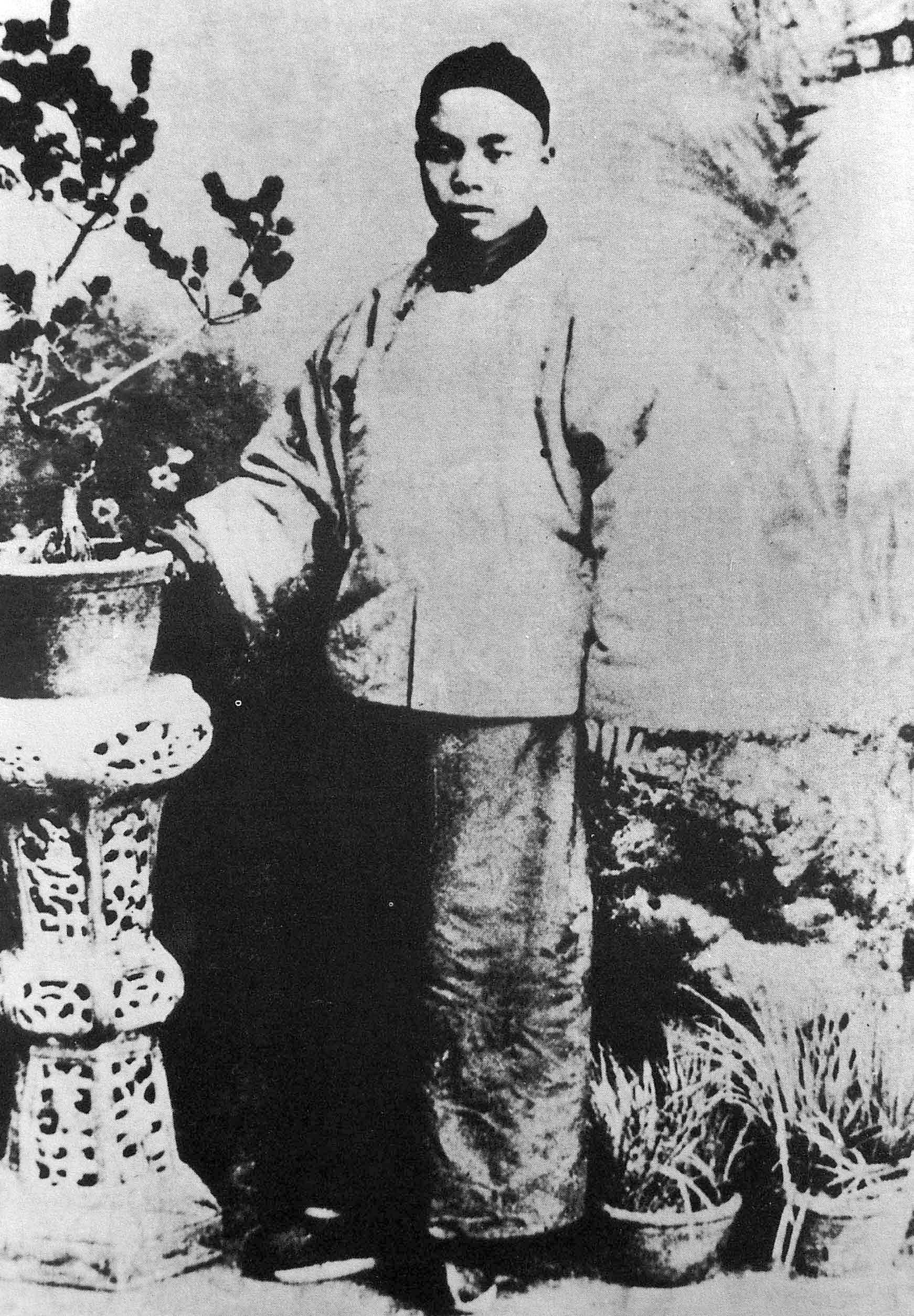
- Born: 1875; Houguan, Fujian (now Fuzhou)
- Died: 28 September 1898 (aged 22–23); Caishikou, Beijing
- Cause of death: Beheading, Execution
- Occupations: Government official, reformer, scholar, writer
- Known for: Advocacy of political reform
- Movement: Reformist faction

Lin Xu (Chinese: 林旭; 1875 – 28 September 1898), courtesy name Tungu (暾谷), was a Chinese politician, scholar, songwriter and poet who lived in Fujian. He was also a student of Kang Youwei, a prominent official and one of the leaders of a reform movement in the late Qing regime.

Lin Xu was one of the "Six Gentlemen of Wuxu". On September 28, 1898, he was executed at Caishikou Execution Grounds in Beijing via decapitation.

== Biography ==
Lin Xu was born in Houguan (侯官), which is now Fuzhou, Fujian. He took the imperial examination locally and obtained the position of a "Jieyuan" (解元) in 1893. In 1895, he had become an official.

In April 1898, in response to foreign imperialism and internal political turmoil within the Qing government, Lin co-founded the State Protection Association (保國會) with others to oppose colonialism. He fought for radical social, educational and political reforms in China. As one of the Six Gentlemen who attempted to implement the Hundred Days' Reform programme with backing from the Guangxu ruler, Lin advocated a radical position in which China would adopt a modern-style government and convert into absolute dictatorship to a Prime minister ruled constitutional monarchy.

However, on 21 September 1898, the conservative faction in the Qing government, led by Empress Dowager Cixi, saw the Hundred Days' Reform programme as a foreign plot to overthrow the government. The State Protection Association was disbanded, and the Hundred Days' Reform was terminated, while the Six Gentlemen were arrested and imprisoned. Seven days later, on 28 September, Empress Dowager Cixi ordered the Six Gentlemen to be executed and beheaded outside Xuanwu Gate in Beijing.
