= Houguan County =

Fujian Province

Houguan County (Chinese: 侯官縣; pinyin: Hóuguān-xiàn) is a former county in Fujian Province, China that is now mostly part of Minhou County, Fuzhou. Established during the Eastern Han dynasty, it was dissolved soon after the founding of the Republic of China in 1912.

== People ==
- Chen Menglei, Qing dynasty scholar and author
- Lin Xu, politician executed by the Qing dynasty during Empress Cixi's reign
