= Liu Guangdi =

Chinese official and reformer (1861–1898)

- 刘光第
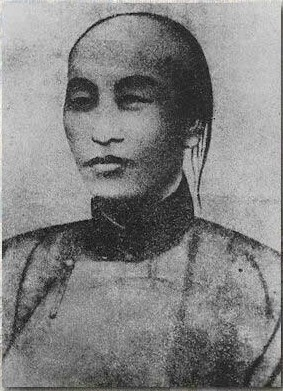
- Sketch of Liu Guangdi

Manager of the Ministry of Penalty (Guangxi Province)
- Monarch: Guangxu
- Parliamentary group: Six gentlemen of the Hundred Days' Reform

Minister of the Military
- Monarch: Guangxu

Personal details
- Born: 18 June 1861
- Died: 28 September 1898 (aged 37) Caishikou Execution Grounds (Death by execution)
- Occupation: Government official, reformist, poet

Liu Guangdi (simplified Chinese: 刘光第; traditional Chinese: 劉光第; 18 June 1861 - 28 September 1898) was a Chinese government minister during the late Qing dynasty. He was a leader of the Hundred Days' Reform movement of 1898. After the reforms were reversed in a coup, he and five other leaders were executed. They are now considered as martyrs and are referred to as the Six Gentlemen. Liu was also a reformist patriotic poet of the late Qing Dynasty.

== Early life and education ==
Liu Guangdi was born in 1859 to Hakka Chinese in Fushun County, Sichuan. After completing his early education in the county, he attended Jinjiang College in 1880. After passing the highest imperial examination, Jinshi, in 1883, he was appointed Apprentice Secretary in a central Board at the capital, and he was appointed as Secretary in the Board of Punishments. Though he had a promising future on official career, he worried about the national fate of the country given foreign incursions and the corruption and degeneration of the ailing Ching/Qing regime.

== Constitutional reform ==
Starting in 1896 there was increasing pressure for Constitutional Reform, which was supported by the Guangxu ruler, then in his 20s.

In 1898, the Constitutional Reform campaign known as the Hundred Days Reform movement, which was led by Kang Youwei and Liang Qichao, reached a climax. Kang Youwei set up the Society for Safeguarding the Empire (Baoguohui 寶國會) and Liu Guangdi joined it with other friends. On 13 April 1898, the Guangxu Emperor ordered Kang to start the reformation. Over the next few months Guangxu published a series of reform measures. In July, Liu Guangdi was recommended to Guangxu because of his sharp political ideas. GuangXu appreciated him, and on 5 September he promoted him as one of the ministers of military.

Actually, the then Grand Council was staff division of the Constitutional Reform. Guangxu was so eager to change China's situation that had to read over hundreds of recommendations every day. Liu Guangdi and Tan Sitong helped him and provided him with solutions. With the help of the reformist, Guangxu published a series of reform measures.

The Constitutional Reform encroached on the interests of the hard-liner conservatives within the imperial court including ministers, bureaucrats, and military leaders; led by Empress Dowager Cixi. Seeing the chaotic political situation, Liu Guangdi grew increasingly concerned about the Cixi's interference in reform efforts. He wanted to get rid of Cixi's control in order to insure success of constitutional reform while staying clean and unsullied in the fierce political whirlpool.

== Execution ==
On 21 September Cixi, backed by army generals, took the unexpected action to arrest Guangxu as she got the secret information from Yuan Shikai. She then issued orders to arrest and kill the reformists. Liu Guangdi was arrested at the Ground Council. On 28 September Cixi ordered the beheading of the reformists without interrogation or trial. On the way to the execution ground, Liu Guangdi still made protests against the decision of Cixi and insisted on the validity of the constitutional reform. He and five others were beheaded and executed without trial at Caishikou, an execution ground in modern China, on 28 September 1898. They are now referred to as the Six Gentlemen of the Hundred Days' Reform and are revered as martyrs to the Chinese nation.

== The tomb of Liu Guangdi ==
The tomb of Liu Guangdi was at Luo Han Temple of Zhao Hua County. In 1984, after the permission of Zigong Government, his skeleton was moved to the back of Martyrs cemetery in Zigong. Zhao Puchu, a great calligrapher and patriots, wrote tablet inscription for him.

== Liberal achievements ==
Liu Guangdi loved literature since his childhood. He had two famous poetry anthologies, which contained 54 essays and 260 poems.

As he liked the styles of poetry of Li Bai and Du Fu, he composed many poems which praised nature and sighed for current affairs. He loved his homeland. He even wrote more than 40 poems to praise the beautiful scenery of Mount Emei. Liu expressed anger at despair towards foreign incursions into Chinese territory and the state of the Chinese nation in his poems. The subject of his poems focused on his hatred of corruption and his patriotism to China.

== Character evaluation ==
Liang Qichao wrote a biography for him. Kang Youwei composed an elegiac couplet for him. They both honored him as the most excellent gentleman of the six martyrs of Constitutional Reform.
