= Caishikou Execution Grounds =

Execution ground in Qing dynasty Beijing

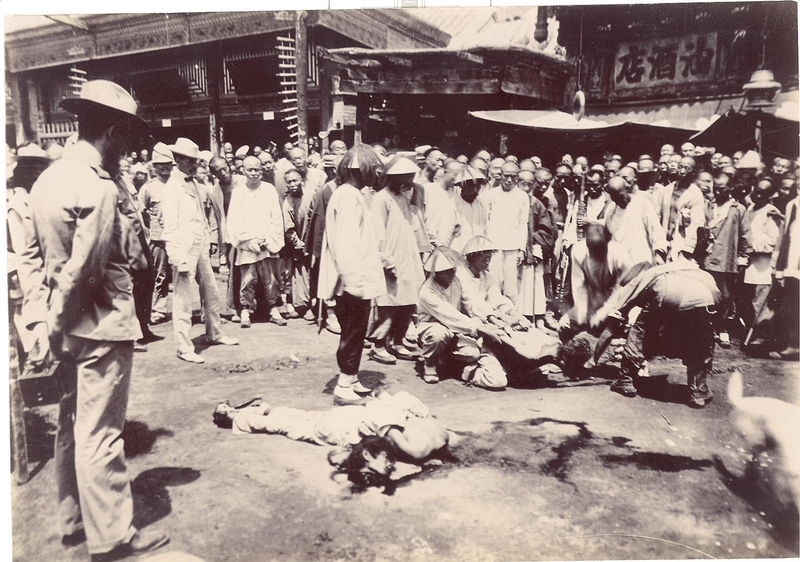
- Execution of Boxers at the execution ground.
- Simplified Chinese: 菜市口法场
- Traditional Chinese: 菜市口法場

Caishikou Execution Grounds (traditional Chinese: 菜市口法場; simplified Chinese: 菜市口法场; pinyin: Càishìkǒu Fǎchǎng), also known as Vegetable Market Execution Ground, was an important execution ground in Caishikou, Beijing during the Qing dynasty era. It was located at the crossroads of Xuanwumen Outer Street and Luomashi Street. The exact location is under debate today. However, contemporary sources and photographs put it across from the Heniantang Pharmacy (Chinese: 鶴年堂藥店).

Executions were usually carried out at 11:30 AM. On the day of the execution, the convict would be carted from the jail cell to the execution grounds. The cart stopped at a wine shop named Broken Bowl (Chinese: 破碗居) on the east side of Xuanwu Gate, where the convict would be offered a bowl of rice wine. The bowl would be smashed after it was drunk. During the executions of infamous convicts, it was common for a large crowd to gather and watch. The torture death by a thousand cuts was also carried out at the execution grounds.

The Catholic bishop Alphonse Favier wrote about the execution ground in the 1890s:

The convicts, on their knees, are executed one after the other, their bodies carried to the dump, their heads hung in little cages on a tripod frame made of poles. Passerby can view the bloodless heads, their huge, terrified eyes half eaten by magpies and crows that peck through the rungs; each queue trails down to the ground; dogs look on and stand on their hind legs trying to get to them

— Alphonse Favier, Péking: histoire et description

== Notable individuals executed at Caishikou ==
Most of these executions were carried out by beheading, with only specific crimes being punished by death by a thousand cuts.

- Zhu Yousong, Hongguang Emperor, first emperor of the Southern Ming Dynasty
- Zhu Changfang, member of the royal family of Southern Ming Dynasty
- Zhu Cunji (朱存極), Ming dynasty Prince of Qin (秦王)
- Zhu Shenxuan (朱审烜), Ming dynasty Prince of Jin (晉世子)
- Zhu Youzou (朱由棷), Ming dynasty Prince of Heng (衡王)
- Zhu Ciyue (朱慈爚), Ming dynasty Prince of Chong (崇王)
- Zhu Youli (朱由櫟), Ming dynasty Prince of De (德王)
- Zhu Cikui (朱慈煃), Ming dynasty Prince of Ji (吉王)
- Zheng Zhilong, father of Koxinga
- Jahangir Khoja, East Turkic Uyghur rebel leader (death by a thousand cuts)
- Six gentlemen of the Hundred Days' Reform:
  - Tan Sitong
  - Lin Xu
  - Yang Rui (杨锐)
  - Yang Shenxiu (杨深秀)
  - Liu Guangdi
  - Kang Guangren (康广仁)
- Xu Jingcheng, Qing diplomat during the Boxer Rebellion.
- Qixiu (启秀), Manchu pro-Boxer official
- Zhong Renjie (鍾人傑)
- Lin Fengxiang (林鳳祥), Taiping rebel
- Li Kaifang, Taiping rebel
- Li Hanjie (李漢傑)

== See also ==
- Caishikou
