= Hundred Days' Reform =

1898 failed reform movement in late Qing dynasty China

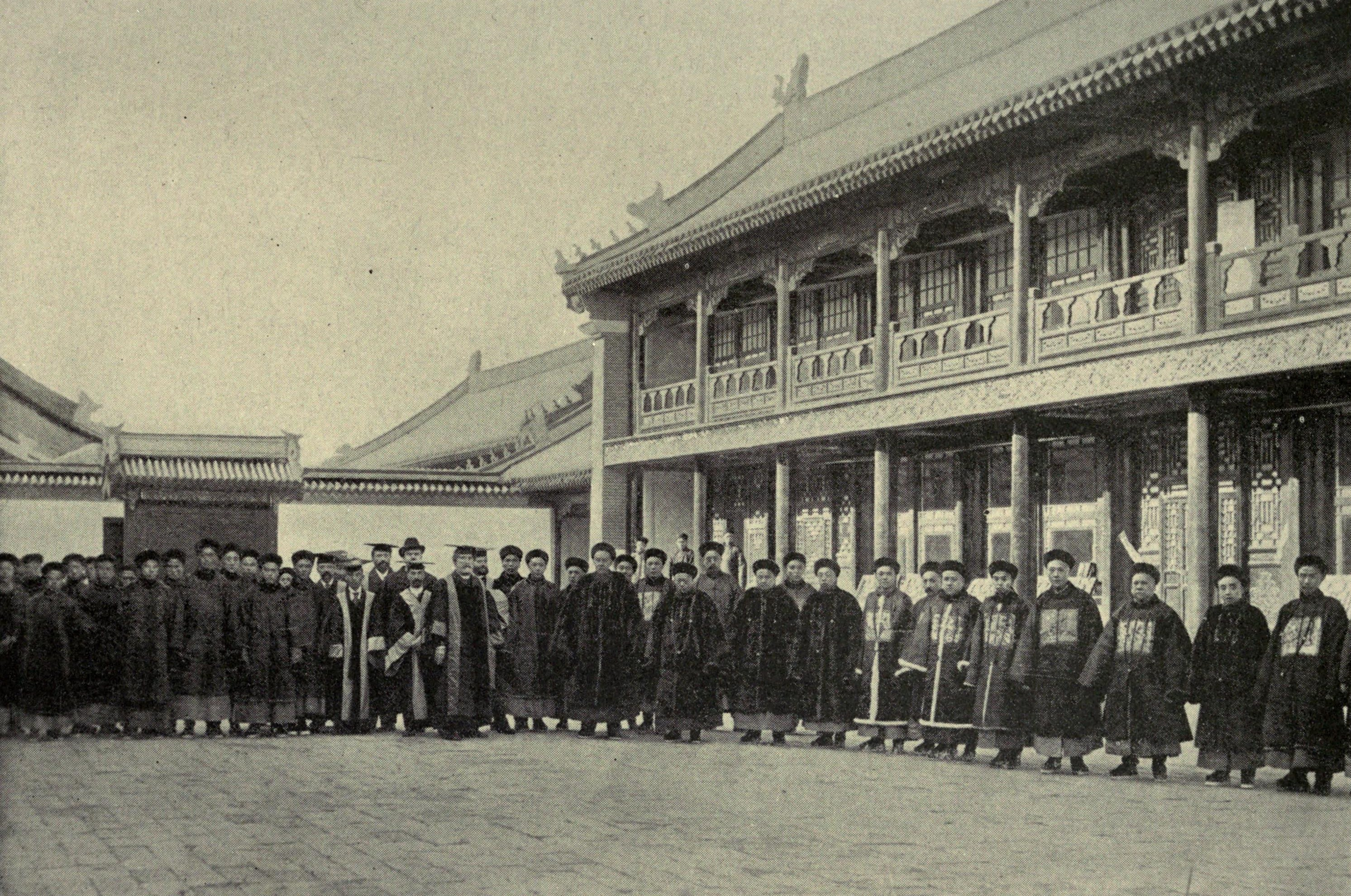
- A group photograph of the faculty and staff of the Imperial University of Peking around 1900. Established during the Hundred Days' Reform of 1898, the Imperial University was one of the very few reform measures that survived after the movement was suppressed
- Traditional Chinese: 戊戌變法
- Simplified Chinese: 戊戌变法
- Literal meaning: Wuxu reform
Transcriptions
Standard Mandarin
- Hanyu Pinyin: wùxū biànfǎ

Alternative Chinese name
- Traditional Chinese: 百日維新
- Simplified Chinese: 百日维新
- Literal meaning: Hundred Days' Reform
Transcriptions
Standard Mandarin
- Hanyu Pinyin: bǎirì wéixīn

The Hundred Days' Reform (traditional Chinese: 百日維新; simplified Chinese: 百日维新; pinyin: Bǎirì Wéixīn; lit. '100 Days Reform') or Wuxu Reform (traditional Chinese: 戊戌變法; simplified Chinese: 戊戌变法; pinyin: Wùxū Biànfǎ; lit. 'Reform of the Wuxu year') was a short-lived national, cultural, political and educational reform movement in the Qing Empire, from June 11 to September 21, 1898. It sought to modernize China's institutions during a time of increasing foreign intervention in China following the country's defeat in the First Sino-Japanese War (1894–1895). Although brief, the movement introduced new political concepts of nationhood and sovereignty, inspiring many of the subsequent "New Policies" reforms launched after 1901.

Initiated by the Guangxu Emperor, it was led by reform-minded scholars, including Kang Youwei and Liang Qichao. Over a period of roughly 100 days, the Guangxu Emperor enacted a series of imperial edicts with various goals in mind. These mandates aimed to restructure government organization, reform the civil service examination system, modernize the army, promote industrial and education progress, and adopt elements of constitutional governance.

Some of these measures were implemented, such as the establishment of the Imperial University of Peking (now Peking University). However, most faced resistance from conservative factions. While Empress Dowager Cixi supported principles of the reform, she feared that sudden implementation, without bureaucratic support, would be disruptive and that the Japanese and other foreign powers would take advantage of any weakness. Thus, on September 21, 1898, Empress Dowager Cixi with her allies staged a coup d'état, forcing the emperor under house arrest and further executing six of the leading reformers. She later backed the late Qing reforms after the invasions of the Eight-Nation Alliance.

== Background ==
Following its defeat in the First (1839–1842) and Second (1856–1860) Opium Wars, China embarked on an effort to modernize which became the Self-Strengthening Movement. Military modernization was a high priority from the beginning of the movement, concentrating more on providing the armed forces with modern weapons than reforming governance or society. Following the Taiping Rebellion in 1850, Empress Dowager Cixi conducted a series of reforms that led to a brief period of time, known as the Tongzhi Restoration, which sought to modernize China using imported Western machinery and weaponry.

Several western supporting individuals, such as Li Hongzhang, wanted to create a modernized military that incorporated western innovations with China. He, as well as a majority, believed that through western influence, China could strengthen its economy and protect itself on a global stage. At the same time, the British military had flintlocks, caplocks, breech-loading rifled artillery, while the Qing had matchlock muskets which had far less rounds and lower accuracy. These differences motivated China to purchase and employ western weaponry.

Apart from firearm imports, China also desired to improve its weapon manufacturing proficiency by building more domestic factories. Established in 1865 Shanghai, the Jiangnan Arsenal was the largest factory in China, producing both ships and firearms. The factory acted as a navy shipyard, building wooden and iron-hulled warships, large numbers of breech-loading rifles, as well as artillery shells. However, initiatives such as the Jiangnan Arsenal met significant challenges, still being considered underdeveloped in comparison to Europe's innovations, and ventures were deprived of imperial funding, slowing the pace of production. While dramatic improvements were made to hardware, the military lacked the organization, training and institutions required to sustain forthcoming wars.

== Reformer proposals ==
The limitations of the Self-Strengthening Movement's emphasis on military and technological projects without fundamental institutional reform were exposed by the First Sino-Japanese War (1894–1895) in which Qing China was defeated by Meiji Japan, a state that had undergone more comprehensive reforms during the same period. The defeat led to additional unequal treaties as European powers took advantage of China's weakness. Specifically, the Treaty of Shimonoseki forced China to recognize Korean independence, cede Taiwan and the Liaodong Peninsula, in addition to paying a large indemnity. The defeat was viewed by Chinese elites as clear evidence of the Self-Strengthening Movement's failure as well as a signal that institutional and constitutional change were required.

Against this backdrop, reformist thinkers such as Tan Sitong (譚嗣同), Kang Youwei (康有爲), and Liang Qichao (梁啓超) responded to what they perceived as China's deep crisis, including political division, insurrection, opium addiction (due to the opium wars) and growing foreign conflicts, by developing influential philosophical systems. These mechanisms, including memorials to the throne, the organization of reform and "study" societies, as well as widely circulated political essays aimed at creating solutions which enacted political reform and a new Chinese reformist movement.

These reformers were influenced by the success of Japan's Meiji constitutional reforms and they argued that China needed more than technical improvements to its armies and its arsenals. Specifically, it required change to its governing institutions, educational systems, as well as social order. Their reforms aimed to move beyond the earlier "Self-Strengthening" model and towards a program of state building. Elements of the Qing government were sufficiently alarmed to permit Kang Youwei and Liang Qichao to propose reforms to Emperor Guangxu who agreed and committed to the ambitious reform agenda Over roughly one hundred days, the throne issued a rapid series of edicts which addressed education, administration, the economy, and the military. Some of Kang's students were also given minor but strategic posts in the capital to assist with the reforms. The reform program included several proposals including:

Educational Reforms:

- Establishing Peking University as a place where sciences, liberal arts and the Chinese classics would all be integrated for study.
- Building a modern education system (studying mathematics and science instead of focusing mainly on Confucian texts)
- Gradual replacing the traditional civil service examination curriculum
- Encouraging imperial family members to study abroad

Administration and Governance Reforms:

- Transitioning to a constitutional monarchy including plans to establish deliberate institutions and to place limits on autocratic rule, drawing from the Meiji model.
- Abolishing the traditional examination system. Reformers saw this system as obstructing the creation of a modern bureaucracy and hindering social mobility.

Economy, Industry, and Infrastructure Reforms:

- Eliminating sinecures (positions that provided little or no work but provided a salary)
- Establishing agricultural schools in all provinces and schools and colleges in all provinces and cities
- Applying principles of capitalism to strengthen the economy, including encouragement of joint stock enterprises and private investment
- Rapid industrialization through manufacturing, commerce, and capitalism
- Establishing trade schools for the manufacture of silk, tea, and other traditional crafts
- Establishing a bureau for railways and mines designed to coordinate infrastructure building on a national scale.

Agriculture Reforms:

- Utilization of underused or vacant military lands for cultivation to increase grain output and relieve rural distress
- Encouraging "modern agriculture" as a state priority
- Establishing agricultural schools in all provinces to teach farmer improved methods of work

Military Reforms:

- Reorganization and modernization of the army through Western style training, drilling and staff systems, and the establishment of a modern military academy
- Establishing a modern naval academy

The reformers declared that China needed more than "Self-Strengthening" and that innovation must be accompanied by institutional and ideological change. Opposition to the reforms was intense among the conservative ruling elite who condemned it as too radical and proposed a more moderate and gradualist alternatives. It provoked strong resistance among senior Manchu princes, Grand Councilors, and provincial governors, many of whom viewed these proposals, such as revising the examination system and as abolishing sinecures, as direct threats to the existing social and political order. Conservatives advocated for slower and more limited change in fear that the use of foreign advisors and Japanese constitutional models would place the Qing state under foreign influence. Conservative Prince Duan urged the expulsion of foreigners such as Timothy Richard and former prime minister Itō Hirobumi from the court.

As tensions between the Guangxu Emperor and Empress Dowager Cixi escalated, some reformers began plotted to forcefully remove Empress Dowager Cixi from power. According to later accounts, Tan Sitong asked Yuan Shikai to kill Ronglu, take control of the garrison at Tientsin, and then march on Beijing and arrest Cixi. However, Yuan had previously promised to support Ronglu; rather than kill him, Yuan informed Ronglu of the plot enabling Cixi and her faction to organize a coup d'état.

== Cixi ends the program ==
Major pro-reform figures

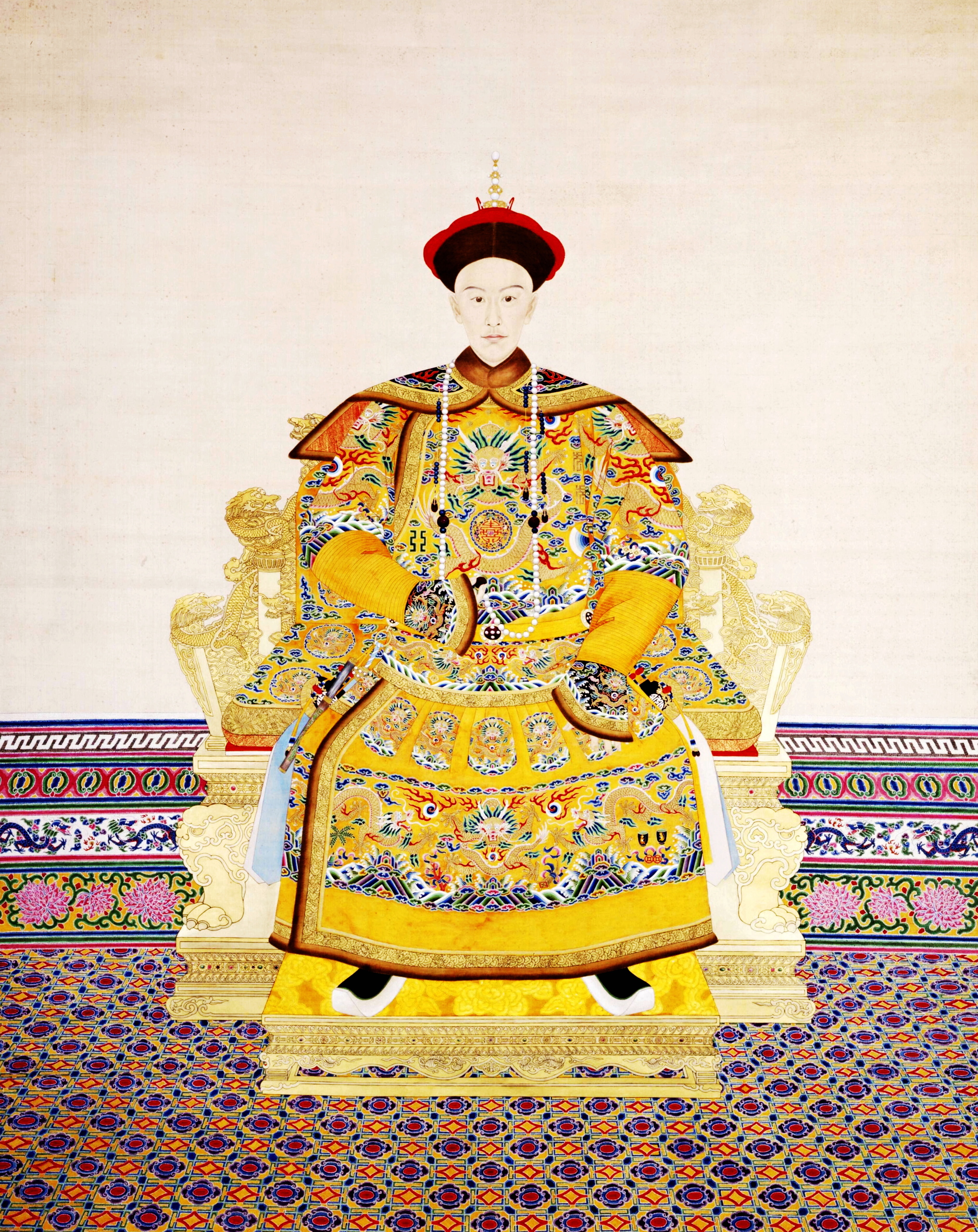
Guangxu Emperor

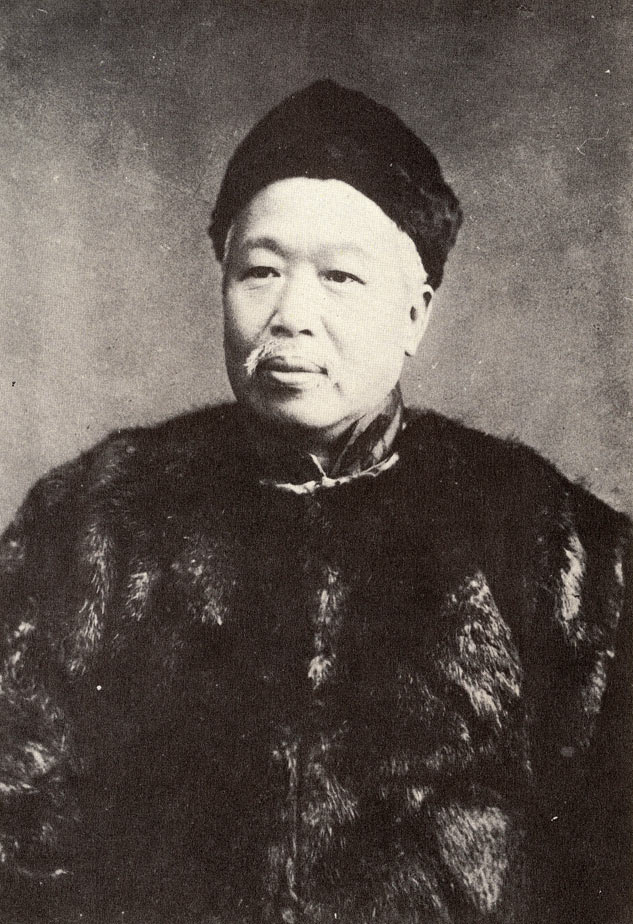
Kang Youwei

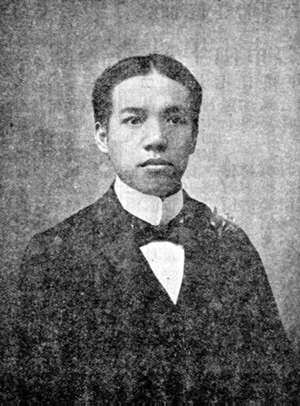
Liang Qichao

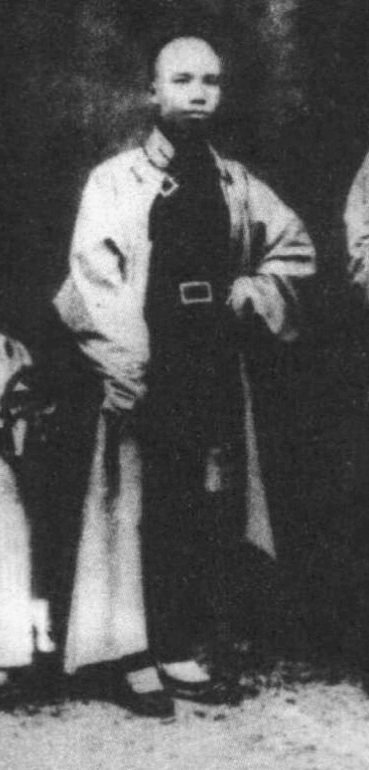
Tan Sitong

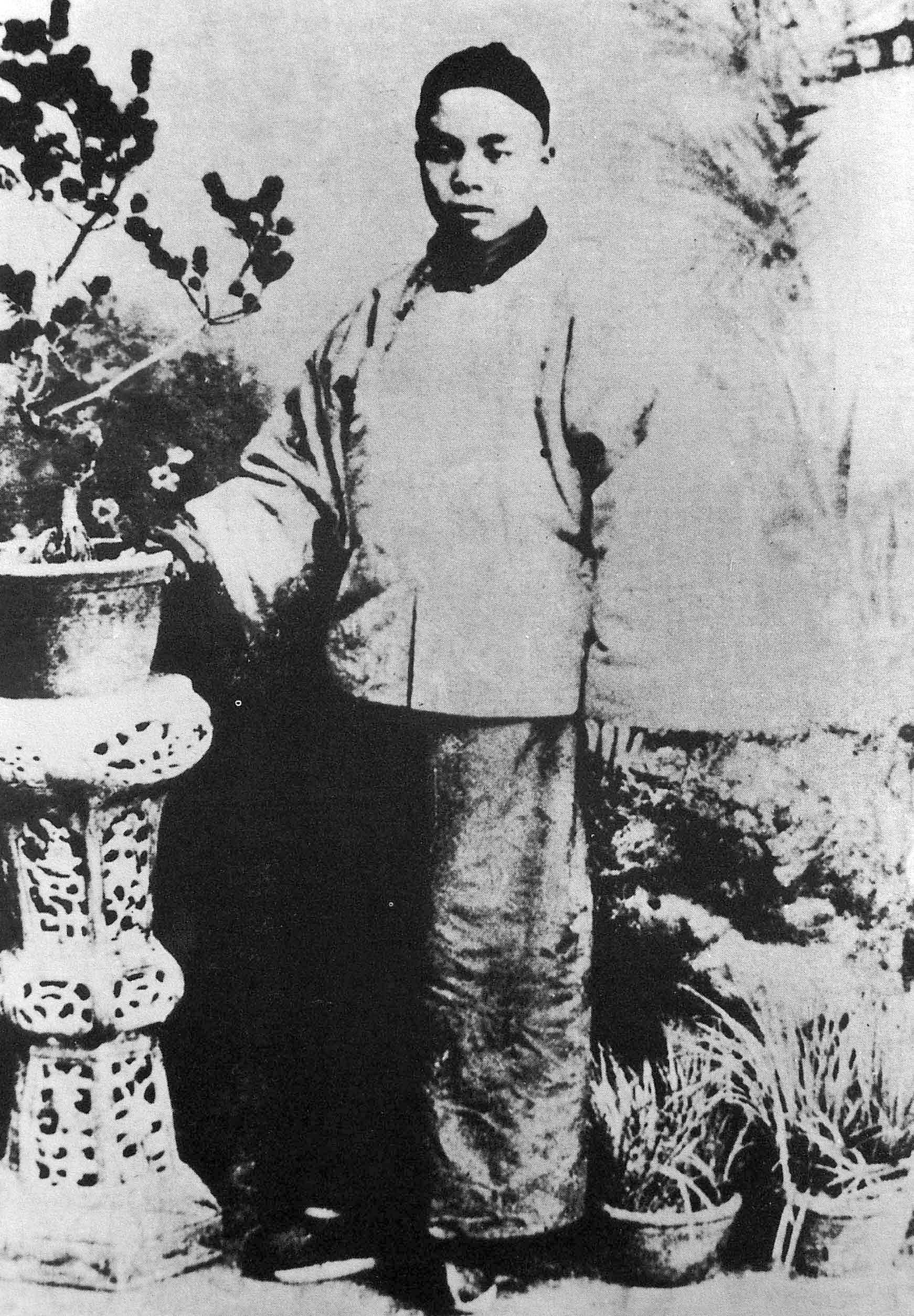
Lin Xu

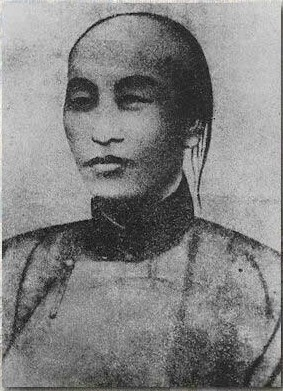
Liu Guangdi

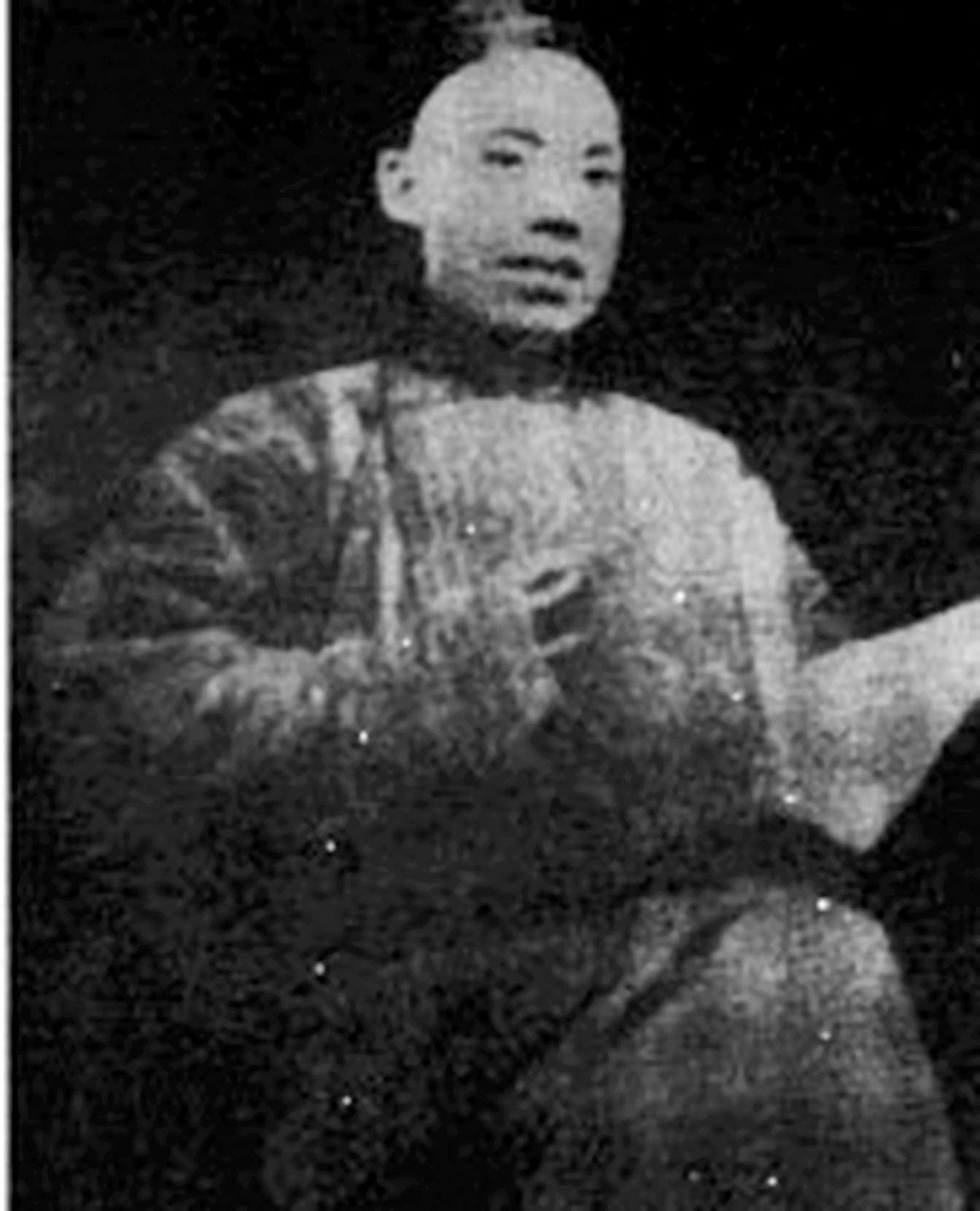
Yang Shenxiu

With the support of the conservatives and the armed forces commanded by Yuan and Ronglu, Cixi launched a coup d'état on September 22, 1898, and took over the government. Guangxu was put under house arrest on the Yingtai Island until his death in 1908.

The reforms were reversed and their chief advocates – the "Six Gentlemen of Wuxu" (戊戌六君子): Tan Sitong, Kang Guangren (Kang Youwei's brother), Lin Xu, Yang Shenxiu, Yang Rui, and Liu Guangdi – were ordered to be executed. Reforms such as the abolishing of the old writing style was put back into mandate, the removal of offices and agencies were reinstituted, and the establishment of certain newspapers, civil societies and schools were all suspended. The two principal leaders, Kang Youwei and his student Liang Qichao, fled to Japan to seek refuge where they founded Baohuang Hui (Protect the Emperor Society) and worked, unsuccessfully, for a constitutional monarchy in China. Tan Sitong refused to flee and was executed. An alternative view is that Liang and Kang had a different objective for leaving for Japan which is to not only justify fleeing China but to also solicit intervention by foreign powers like Britain or Japan to rescue Emperor Guangxu.

During the Hundred Days' Reform, generals Dong Fuxiang, Ma Anliang, and Ma Haiyan were called to Beijing and helped put an end to the movement along with Ma Fulu and Ma Fuxiang. Dong Fuxiang and the Muslim Gansu Army stationed in Beijing during the Hundred Days' Reform later participated in the Boxer Rebellion and became known as the Kansu Braves.

== Aftermath ==
The late Qing reforms attempted in the years following the Hundred Days included the abolition of the Imperial examination in 1905, educational and military modernization patterned after the model of Japan, and experiments in constitutional and parliamentary government. The ultimate failure of these reforms gave impetus to revolutionary forces within the country. Changes within the establishment were seen to be largely hopeless, and the overthrow of the Qing increasingly appeared to be the only way to save China. Despite the late Qing reforms of the early 1900s, such sentiments directly contributed to the success of the Xinhai Revolution in 1911.

Leo Tolstoy corresponded with Gu Hongming on the Hundred Day's Reform and agreed that the reform movement was ill-advised. The reformist Kang Party, formed by students of Kang and Liang, was one of the most alarming groups in the eyes of court conservatives at this time.

== Differing interpretations ==
Views of the Hundred Days' Reform have become more nuanced in analyses of some historians. The mainstream view is that the reformers were heroic but unorganized, trying to ideologically reform and save the backwards state, but were hampered by the ruling conservative faction, led by the Empress Dowager Cixi who were afraid the results would impede on their own power.

=== Failure as Kang's responsibility ===
However, some historians in the late 20th century have taken views that are more favorable to the conservatives and less favorable to the reformers. In this view, Kang Youwei and his allies were hopeless dreamers unaware of the political realities in which they operated. This view argues that the conservative elites were not opposed to change.

For example, Sterling Seagrave, in his book The Dragon Lady, argues that there were several reasons why the reforms failed. Chinese political power at the time was firmly in the hands of the ruling Manchu nobility. The highly xenophobic iron hats faction dominated the Grand Council and were seeking ways to expel all Western influence from China. When implementing reform, the Guangxu Emperor by-passed the Grand Council and appointed four reformers to advise him. These reformers were chosen after a series of interviews, including the interview of Kang Youwei, who was rejected by the Emperor and had far less influence than Kang's later boasting would indicate. At the suggestion of the reform advisors, the Guangxu Emperor also held secret talks with former Japanese Prime Minister Itō Hirobumi with the aim of using his experience in the Meiji Restoration to lead China through similar reforms.

It has also been suggested, controversially, that Kang Youwei actually did a great deal of harm to the cause by his perceived arrogance in the eyes of the conservatives. Numerous rumors regarding potential repercussions, many of them false, had made their way to the Grand Council; this was one of the factors in their decision to stage a coup against the Emperor. Kang, like many of the reformers, grossly underestimated the reactionary nature of the vested interests involved.

The Emperor set about to enact his reforms by largely bypassing the powerful Grand Council; said councilors, irritated at the Emperor's actions and fearful of losing the political power they had, then turned to the Empress Dowager Cixi to remove the Emperor from power. Many, though not all, of the reforms came to naught. The council, now confident in their power, pushed for the execution of the reformers, an action that was carried out ruthlessly.

=== Richard's federation theory ===
According to Professor Lei Chia-sheng (雷家聖), Japanese former prime minister Itō Hirobumi (伊藤博文) arrived in China on September 11, 1898, about the same time that Kang Youwei invited British missionary Timothy Richard to Beijing. Richard suggested that China appoint Itō as one of many foreign advisors in order to further push China's reform efforts. On September 18, Richard successfully convinced Kang to adopt his plan in which China would join a federation (合邦) of ten nations.

Kang nonetheless asked fellow reformers Yang Shenxiu (楊深秀) and Song Bolu (宋伯魯) to report this plan to the Guangxu Emperor. On September 20, Yang sent a memorial to the emperor to that effect. In another memorial to the Emperor written the next day, Song advocated the formation of a federation and the sharing of the diplomatic, fiscal, and military powers of the four countries under a hundred-man committee. Lei Chia-sheng argues that this idea was the reason why Cixi, who had just returned from the Summer Palace on September 19, decided to put an end to the reforms with the September 21 coup.

On October 13, following the coup, British ambassador Claude MacDonald reported to his government that Chinese reforms had been "much injured" by Kang and his friends' actions. However, the British and American governments had been largely unaware of the "federation" plot, which appears to have been Richard's own personal idea. The Japanese government might have been aware of Richard's plan, since his accomplice was the former Japanese prime minister, but there is no evidence to this effect yet.

== See also ==
- History of China
- Qing dynasty
- Late Qing reforms
- Economy of China
- Economic history of China before 1912
- Economic history of China (1912–1949)
