= Caishikou =

Neighborhood in Beijing, China

Coordinates: 39.8893°N 116.3744°E

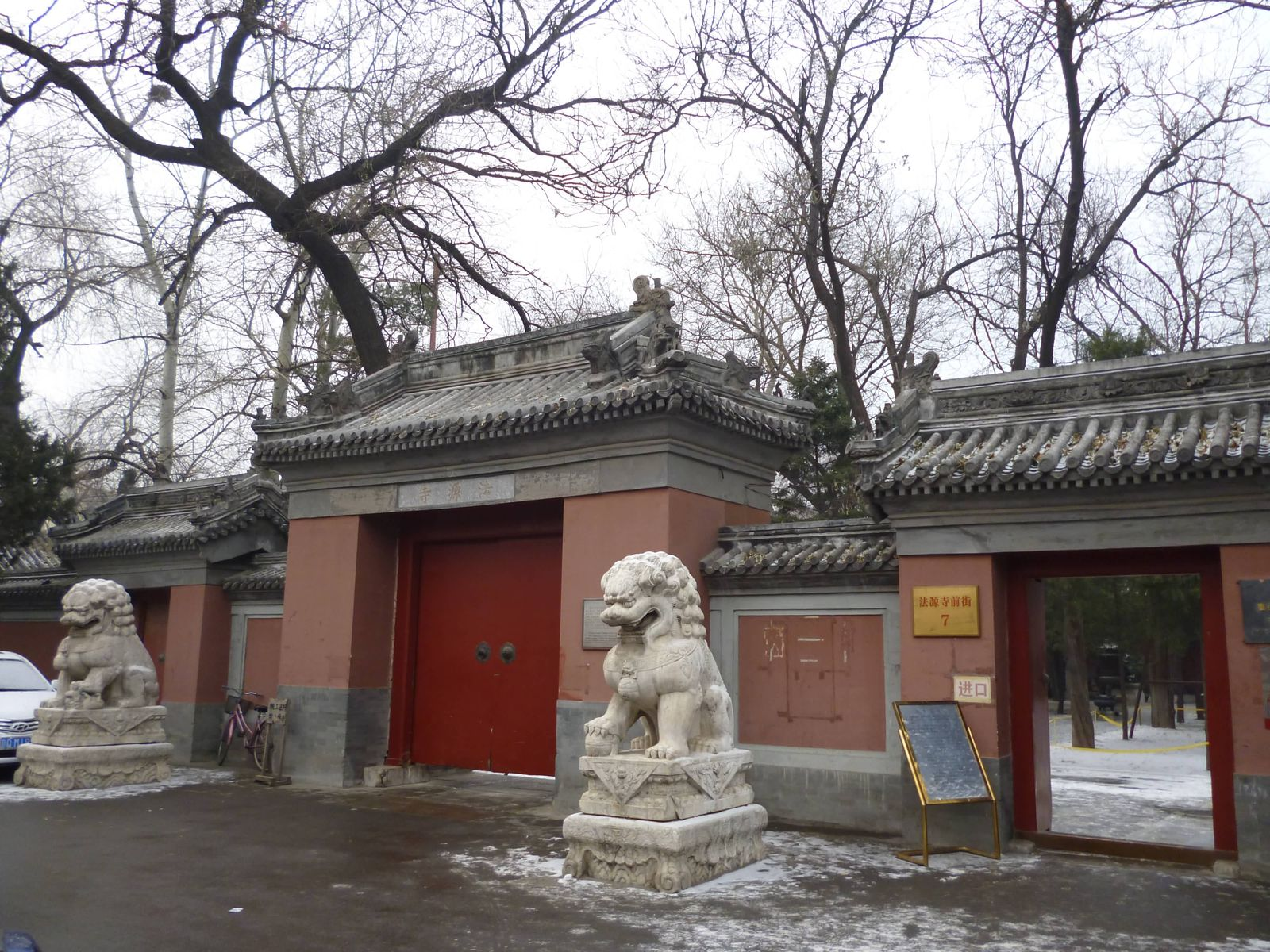
Fayuan Temple main entrance, in Caishikou

Caishikou (Chinese: 菜市口; pinyin: Càishìkǒu) is a neighborhood in Beijing, situated in Xicheng District.

Part of it, known as Caishikou Execution Grounds (菜市口法场), was where most of Beijing's capital punishments were carried out during the Qing dynasty era and were open to public viewing.

Caishikou is served by Caishikou Station, on lines 4 and 7 of the Beijing Subway.
