= Uyghurs in Beijing =

Ethnic group in Beijing

Uyghurs in Beijing are both first-generation Uyghurs who have arrived in Beijing, China, and second-generation Uyghurs who perceive themselves as Beijingers.

== History ==
=== Tang to Yuan dynasties ===
During the Tang dynasty, the ancient Uyghur Kingdom and the Tang government had close relations and large numbers of ancient Uyghurs of Mongolia including merchants and soldiers migrated to Youzhou (modern Beijing). The Tang governor of Youzhou, Zhu Tao, who rebelled against the Tang dynasty in 783, had a Uyghur wife and 3,000 Uyghur cavalry under his command. After the Uyghur Kingdom was conquered by the Yenisei Kirghiz in 840, many Uyghurs fled south to Tang China and some 30,000 settled in Youzhou. In the Liao dynasty, Youzhou became the Southern Capital of the Liao and Uyghurs merchants lived in a part of the city known as the Weiwuerying or the "Uyghur Camp."In the Anshi Rebellion and the subsequent war, almost all of these Uyghurs were killed.

After Genghis Khan captured Beijing from the Jin dynasty in 1215, Uyghur noble families serving the Mongol court were sent to administer the city, then renamed Yanjing. These Uyghur nobles were from the Qocho Kingdom, which was formed in the Tarim Basin in 855 and submitted to the Mongols in 1209. Among the Uyghurs who came to Yanjing was Buluhaya, who was a lieutenant of Genghis Khan and given the rank of financial manager. He built a large estate outside the city along the Gaoliang River and moved his mother there. The settlement became known as the Weiwuercun or the "Uyghur Village." After Buluhaya's death, he was posthumously honored by Külüg Khan as the Duke of Wei. It is believed that Weigongcun or the Village of the Duke of Wei, was so-named because of Buluhaya (布鲁海牙).

Another Uyghur noble sent to Yanjing was Alihaya (阿里海牙), who served as a minister of the governments of the capital region (after Yanjing became the capital of the Yuan dynasty) and Huguang. Alihaya married a relative of Buluhaya. His son, Xiaoyunshihaya (小云石海牙), also known as Guan Yunshi, was a noted scholar in the Hanlin Academy.

Perhaps the most famous Uyghur official was Mengsusi (蒙速思), the Darughachi or governor of the Yanjing region, who served in the court of Kublai Khan. Mengsusi's daughter was married to the son of Buluhaya, Lian Xixian (廉希宪). Mengsusi's son, Ashitimur, served as the Minister over the Masses, and was buried in Weigoncun.

Buluhaya's descendants took on the surname Lian (廉), while Alihaya's were named Guan (贯). In the early 1950s, the Lians were still among the 17 farming families living in Weigongcun. In 2001, a daughter of a Lian was still living there.

The Uyghur nobles who moved to Weigongcun in the Yuan dynasty practiced Buddhism, the religion of the Qocho Kingdom. Later Uyghur migrants to Beijing were Muslims, and usually congregated in or near the city's Hui Muslim communities.

=== Qing dynasty and Republican era ===
After the Qing dynasty conquered Xinjiang in the 1750s, a number of nobles, artisans, entertainers, merchants, clerics, and prisoners, were relocated to Beijing. Several families of nobility, including members of the Khoja clan and the Huo-ji-si, had assisted in the Qing campaign. They became members of the Mongol Plain White Banner and quarters were built for them at Huiziying, just southwest of the Forbidden City on West Chang'an Avenue and East Anfu Hutong. During the reign of the Qianlong Emperor, there were 329 Uyhurs living in Huiziying. Some 300 Altishahri musicians and dancers were brought to Beijing, and performed at court banquests. By the reign of the Guangxu Emperor, there were over 1,800 Altishahri musicians and dancers. The Qianlong Emperor established a mosque in Beijing for this community.

After the 1911 Xinhai Revolution, some residents of this community moved back to Xinjiang, while others remained. In the early 1930s, there were 108 Uyghur households with 795 inhabitants living in Huiziying.

=== Under the People's Republic of China ===
By the early 1950s, Weigongcun had only a handful of farming families and had long lost its Uyghur character. The local population grew as the city of Beijing expanded into Haidian District and residents from other parts of Beijing moved into high rises built in the neighborhood. The opening of the Nationalities University (now known as Minzu University of China in English) nearby, however, brought a new wave of Uyghur residents.

Most Uyghurs moved to improve their economic standing. Nimrod Baranovitch, author of Inverted Exile: Uyghur Writers and Artists in Beijing and the Political Implications of Their Work, wrote that "the movement of Uyghurs from Xinjiang to Beijing had much in common with the great migration of millions of other people who transplanted themselves from China's periphery to the major cities to struggle for their share of the country's burgeoning prosperity." Baranovitch argued that "for many Uyghurs it was ethnic politics that shaped every aspect of their movement to the Chinese capital and their life there—a factor that has made their overall experience unique."

In the early 1980s, several hundred Uyghurs from Xinjiang moved to Beijing to trade fabrics, scarves and household products. They mainly congregated along Wangfujing Avenue, near the Dong'an Market and Wangfujing Department Store, and shipped goods back to Xinjiang at the Bamiancao Post Office.

In 1985, after private markets were officially permitted in Beijing, more Uyghurs arrived, opening street stands that sold kebabs and dried fruit. They were active around the Beijing railway station, Beijing Zoo, Ganjiakou, Weigongcun, Renmin University and Haidian township.

== Geography ==
The first Xinjiang restaurants opened near Ganjiakou at Beishagou and Weigongcun in the mid-1980s. These neighborhoods developed into the first ethnic Uyghur enclaves in modern Beijing.

Beishagou is located about 300 meters north of the Ganjiakou Department Store, close to the Xinjiang Office in Beijing. The first Xinjiang wonton restaurant opened here in 1984 and there were 15 by 1987. In 1992, the Haidian District Government officially called the neighborhood, Xinjiangcun or "Xinjiang Village" and by 1993, there were 33 Xinjiang restaurants in Beishagou with 500-600 registered residents from Xinjiang. In 1999, Beishagou Street was widened and shops and restaurants were demolished, including dozens of Xinjiang businesses. The Haidian government paid nearly ¥10 million in compensation, but the restaurants were scattered to other parts of the city and country.

In Weigongcun, the first Xinjiang restaurant opened in 1983 and a "Xinjiang Street" emerged along the north wall of the Nationalities University. By 1996, there were 18 Xinjiang restaurants along with ethnic Tibetan, Dai, Mongolian, Korean and Hui restaurants.

In 2007 Baranovitch stated that he had been told that many Uyghur people live in Niujie, a Hui neighborhood, and that there was a new "Xinjiangcun" (C: 新疆村, P: Xīnjiāngcūn, "Xinjiang Village") ethnic enclave that was established in proximity to the Beijing West railway station.

== Demographics ==
The 2002 China Population Statistics Yearbook (S: 中国人口统计年鉴, P: Zhōngguó rénkǒu tǒngjì niánjiàn), compiled by the National Bureau of Statistics China Department of Population, Social, Science and Technology Statistics (S: 国家统计局人口和社会科技统计司 Guójiā Tǒngjìjú Rénkǒu hé Shèhuì Kējì Tǒngjì Sī), stated that 3,129 Uyghur lived in Beijing. Baranovitch stated that the actual number of Uyghur in Beijing is greater than that because official statistics do not "include the floating population". Baranovitch stated that he had informants tell him that there were 10,000 Uyghurs in 2001 and 13,000 Uyghurs in 2005 but he was unable to verify the figures.

Uyghurs living in Beijing have a low fertility rate, similar to other populations in the area.

== Economics ==
In a 1996 study of 11 Xinjiang restaurants in Weigongcun, Yang Shengmin found that the owners were from Urumqi, Kashgar and Yining. Most were small businesspeople in Xinjiang, but some were farmers and teachers, workers and government staff. All of the chefs were from Xinjiang, usually from the same town of origin as the owner, along with 70% of the restaurant staff. The restaurants attracted a diverse clientele including local residents, migrants from Xinjiang, students from the nearby Nationalities University, and foreign embassies, particularly Islamic countries. The annual profit of the restaurants varied from ¥50,000 to nearly ¥1,000,000.

In 2007 Blaine Kaltman, author of Under the Heel of the Dragon: Islam, Racism, Crime, and the Uighur in China, wrote that most Uyghur worked in the food services sector. Kaltman stated that Uyghur worked in Niujie in Xuanwu District (now Xicheng District), Weigongcun in Haidian District, and other areas in Beijing.

Baranovitch wrote that in the 1990s wealthier Uyghur in Beijing opened Xinjiang-style restaurants. Other Uyghur in Beijing sold fruit such as grapes and melons which had originated from Xinjiang, and others sold yangrouchua'r or Xinjiang-style barbecued mutton. At the time some Uyghur engaged in the sale of illegal drugs, pickpocketing, and other unlawful activities.

== Language ==
In 2007 Kaltman wrote that "Most Beijing Uighur speak reasonable, if not entirely proper, Mandarin, especially those residing and working outside Uighur enclaves."

== Politics ==
In Yang Shengmin's 1996 study, most of the owners and staff of the Xinjiang restaurants lacked local residence permits and have to pay for basic services. The subdistrict authorities charged them ¥40 per year for a public restroom fee. They were required to pay ¥1,000-2,000 per year to send their children to local public schools. Many of their children grew up in Beijing, spoke Beijing Mandarin more fluently than Uyghur but did not identify as Beijing residents. They felt marginalized in Beijing society and believed their future lay back in Xinjiang.

In 2007 Baranovitch argued that within Beijing Uyghurs living there had "a rare freedom to voice dissent" that they could not have in Xinjiang. Baranovitch stated that according to several accounts, Uyghur people could "live a normal life" by engaging in a "more equal" job competition, practice the Islamic religion "more freely" and "speak much more freely" due to Beijing's lack of proximity to Xinjiang.

Baranovitch stated that according to recent literature, national government officials had increased concern with Uyghur ethnic nationalism, causing a "growing political and cultural repression" against the Uyghur population in Xinjiang province since the mid-1990s. According to Baranovich, this convinced Uyghurs to lengthen their stays in Beijing or to move to Beijing. Baranovitch argues "that the experience of many of the Uyghurs who live in Beijing is closer to that of exiles and refugees than to that described in the growing body of literature on internal migrants in China."

Uyghurs experienced harassment and discrimination originating from other Beijing residents and government authorities. Baranovitch wrote that because they were not Han Chinese, many Uyghurs in Beijing felt a sense of alienation, that they were on a "foreign" territory.

In 2007 Baranovitch wrote that "The little research that has been done on these Uyghurs identify and study them as "internal migrants" and as part of the city's large "floating population" (liudong renkou)" [流动人口].

== See also ==
- Demographics of Beijing
- Hui people in Beijing
- Minzu University of China
