= North Minzu University =

University in China

- 北方民族大学
- Former names: Northern University for Nationalities/Second Northwest University for Nationalities/Northwest Second Minzu University
- Type: National University
- Established: 1984; 42 years ago
- Affiliations: State Ethnic Affairs Commission
- President: Li Junjie
- Administrative staff: 1,332
- Students: 21,000
- Location: Yinchuan, Ningxia, China; 38°29′48″N 106°6′36.2″E
- Website: en.nmu.edu.cn

North Minzu University (abbreviated as NMU; Chinese: 北方民族大学; pinyin: Běifāng Mínzú Dàxúe) is a Chinese university located at Yinchuan City, Ningxia Province, China. It is a comprehensive national institution of higher education which is affiliated to the State Ethnic Affairs Commission. The university is authorized to grant bachelor's, master's and doctor's degrees approved by the Academic Degree Commission of the State Council. NMU is the only university at the central ministry and commission level that is established in an autonomous region, located in Yinchuan, the capital city of Ningxia Hui Autonomous Region. The university was founded in 1984 as Northwest Second Minzu University. In 2008, it was renamed to North Minzu University.

There are over 21,000 master students, undergraduate students and preparatory students studying in NMU from 56 ethnic groups of 31 provinces. The university is focusing on minority education and has over 60% minority students. In the past three decades, NMU has educated over 50,000 minority students.

== Academic programmes ==
There are 72 undergraduate majors in 10 disciplines, including literature, science, engineering, law, history, management, economics, art, education and medicine. There are 10 first-level disciplines able to authorize master degrees including ethnology, and 9 professional master degrees including MPA. Besides, ethnology can authorize the first-level discipline doctor's degree. There are 16 key disciplines at the provincial and ministerial level including the history of China's ethnic minorities discipline, 4 national characteristic majors including material science and engineering, 9 provincial and ministerial-level characteristic majors including Chinese language and literature. In addition, there are 4 key construction majors at the provincial and ministerial level, 7 provincial and ministerial-level key construction programs (groups). Materials science is a national-level experimental teaching center. There are 8 provincial and ministerial experimental teaching demonstration centers, including the Demonstration Center and Chemical Technology Foundation.

== International cooperation ==
The Hefei University of Technology is a counterpart support university designated by the National Ethnic Affairs Commission and the Ministry of Education. NMU is also cooperating with Peking University, Xi'an Jiaotong University, University of Science and Technology Beijing, Lanzhou University and other domestic universities, scientific research institutions, local governments, and industrial enterprises. The university established the International Education College in 2014, joined the Silk Road University Alliance in 2015, and was approved by 3 Ministry of Education national and regional research centers in 2017. By holding Chinese training classes for young people from Central Asia and Ningxia International Sister Cities, recruiting and cultivating foreign students for Chinese language training, academic education, and project training. As of 2020, there are 82 international students. The university has successively signed cooperation agreements with more than 60 universities and institutions in 28 countries and regions including the United States, France, and Malaysia.

== Rankings and reputation ==
In 2021, NMU ranked 233rd among all Chinese Universities in the "Alumni Association 2021 China University Rankings".

In 2021, NMU is the top university in Ningxia with top level research majors.

== See also ==
Other universities for ethnic minorities in the People's Republic of China:

- Minzu University of China
- South-Central University for Nationalities
- Southwest Minzu University
- Northwest Minzu University
- Dalian Minzu University
- Guangxi University for Nationalities
- Yunnan University for Nationalities
- Qinghai University for Nationalities
- Inner Mongolia University for Nationalities
