= Wangzuo =

Wangzuo Town 王佐镇
- Town
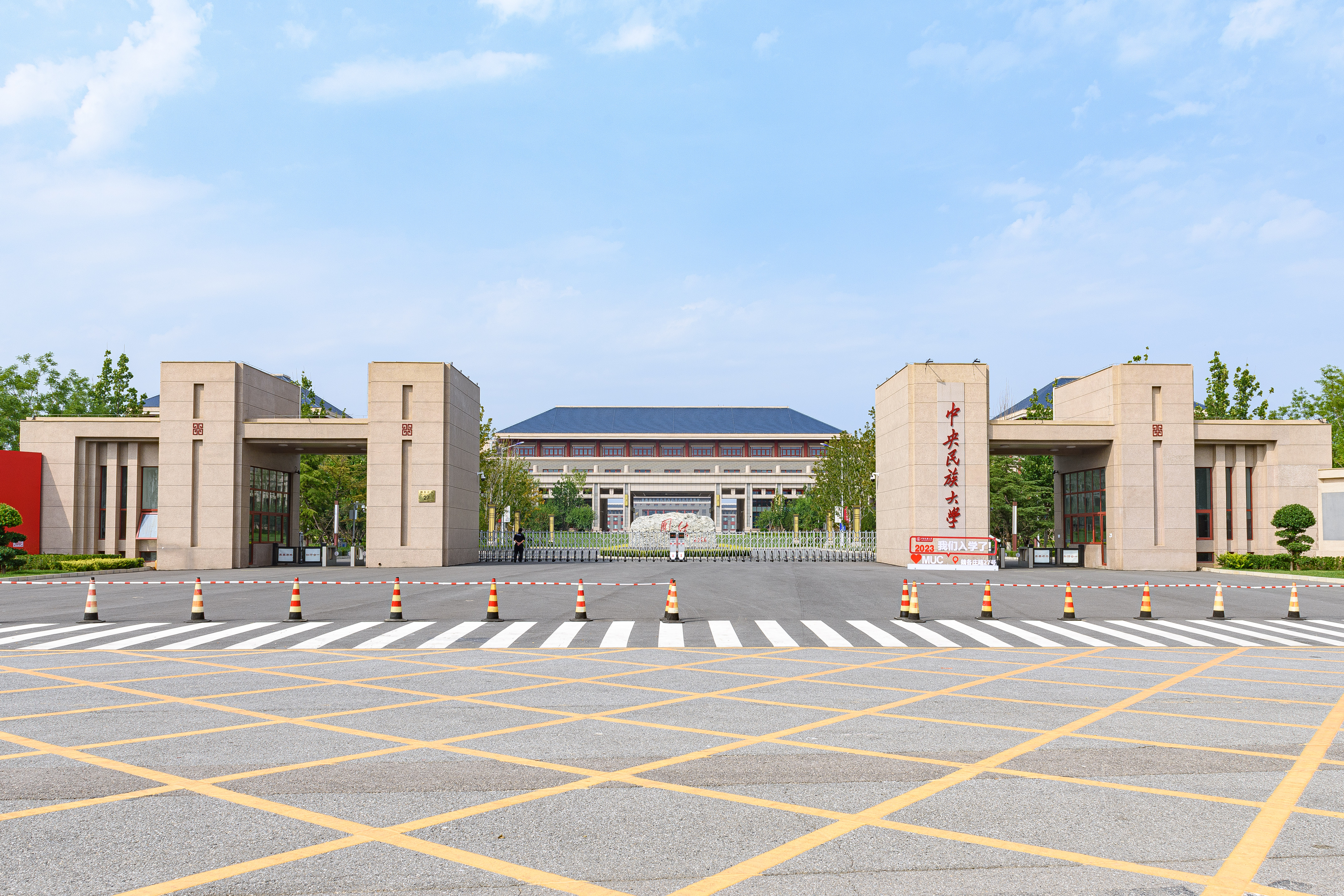
- Minzu University of China (Fengtai campus) in Weigezhuang village, September 2023

- Location within Beijing Location within China
- Coordinates: 39°48′01″N 116°09′00″E
- Country: China
- Municipality: Beijing
- District: Fengtai
- Village-level Divisions: 4 communities 8 village

Area
  - Total: 55.68 km^{2} (21.50 sq mi)

Population (2020)
  - Total: 59,452
  - Density: 1,068/km^{2} (2,765/sq mi)
- Time zone: UTC+8 (China Standard)
- Postal code: 100074
- Area code: 010

Wangzuo Town (Chinese: 王佐镇; pinyin: Wángzuǒ Zhèn) a town on the southwest of Fengtai District, Beijing, China. It is bordering Yongding Township to the north, Beigong Town and Yungang Subdistrict to the east, Changyang Town, Gongcheng and Xilu Subdistricts to the south, Qinglonghu and Tanzhesi Towns to the west. The town had a population of 59,452 in 2020.

The name of Wangzuo (Chinese: 王佐) Town was given during the Qing dynasty by a noble who chose to be buried in the region after his death.

== History ==
History of Wangzuo Town
Year	Status
1945	Part of Liangxiang County, Hebei
1958	Transferred to Fengtai District, Beijing, later incorporated into Changxindian People's Commune
1961	Separated out of Changxindian and formed its own commune
1984	Reformed into Wangzuo Township
2001	Reformed into a town
2021	Part of Yungang Subdistrict was incorporated into Wangzuo Town

== Administrative Division ==
As of 2021, Wangzuo Town consisted of 12 subdivisions, including 4 communities and 8 villages:

Administrative Division Code	Community Names	Name Transliteration	Type
110106101001	南宫雅苑	Nangong Yayuan	Community
110106101002	山语城	Shanyucheng	Community
110106101003	翡翠山	Feicuishan	Community
110106101004	南宫景苑	Nangong Jingyuan	Community
110106101200	西庄店	Xizhuangdian	Village
110106101201	沙锅	Shaguo	Village
110106101202	怪	Guai	Village
110106101203	魏各庄	Weigezhuang	Village
110106101204	西王佐	Xiwangzuo	Village
110106101205	南宫	Nangong	Village
110106101206	庄户	Zhuanghu	Village
110106101207	佃起	Dianqi	Village

== Tourism ==
Qinglong Lake Park (青龙湖公园) is located in Wangzuo.

== See also ==
- List of township-level divisions of Beijing
