= Weigongcun =

Weigongcun may refer to:

- Weigongcun, Beijing, area of Beijing, China
- Weigongcun Station, on Beijing Subway, China
