= Minzu University of China =

National public university in China

- 中央民族大学
- Former name: The Central University for Nationalities
- Motto: 美美与共，知行合一
- Motto in English: Diversity in Unity, Theory in Practice
- Type: National
- Established: 1941; 85 years ago
- Affiliations: National Ethnic Affairs Commission, UASR
- Party Secretary: Zhang Jingze
- Faculty: 1,200
- Administrative staff: 1,991 (including academic staff)
- Students: 15,800
- Undergraduates: 11,200
- Postgraduates: 4,600
- Location: Beijing, China; 39°56′54″N 116°19′03″E
- Campus: Urban
- Website: www.muc.edu.cn

Chinese name
- Simplified Chinese: 中央民族大学
- Traditional Chinese: 中央民族大學
- Literal meaning: Central Ethnic Groups/Nationalities University
Transcriptions
Standard Mandarin
- Hanyu Pinyin: Zhōngyāng Mínzú Dàxúe

The Minzu University of China (MUC) is a national public university in Beijing, China. It is affiliated with the National Ethnic Affairs Commission of the United Front Work Department of the Central Committee of the Chinese Communist Party. The university is part of Project 211, Project 985, and the Double First-Class Construction.

Minzu University ranked first in China among universities for ethnic minority studies. It aims to be one of the best universities of its kind in the world for inheriting and promoting the excellent culture of all ethnic groups. With the strong support of Chinese government, it has developed rapidly over the years. MUC is one of the most prestigious universities in China in ethnology, anthropology, ethnic economies, regional economics, religion studies, history, dance, and fine arts.

== Name ==
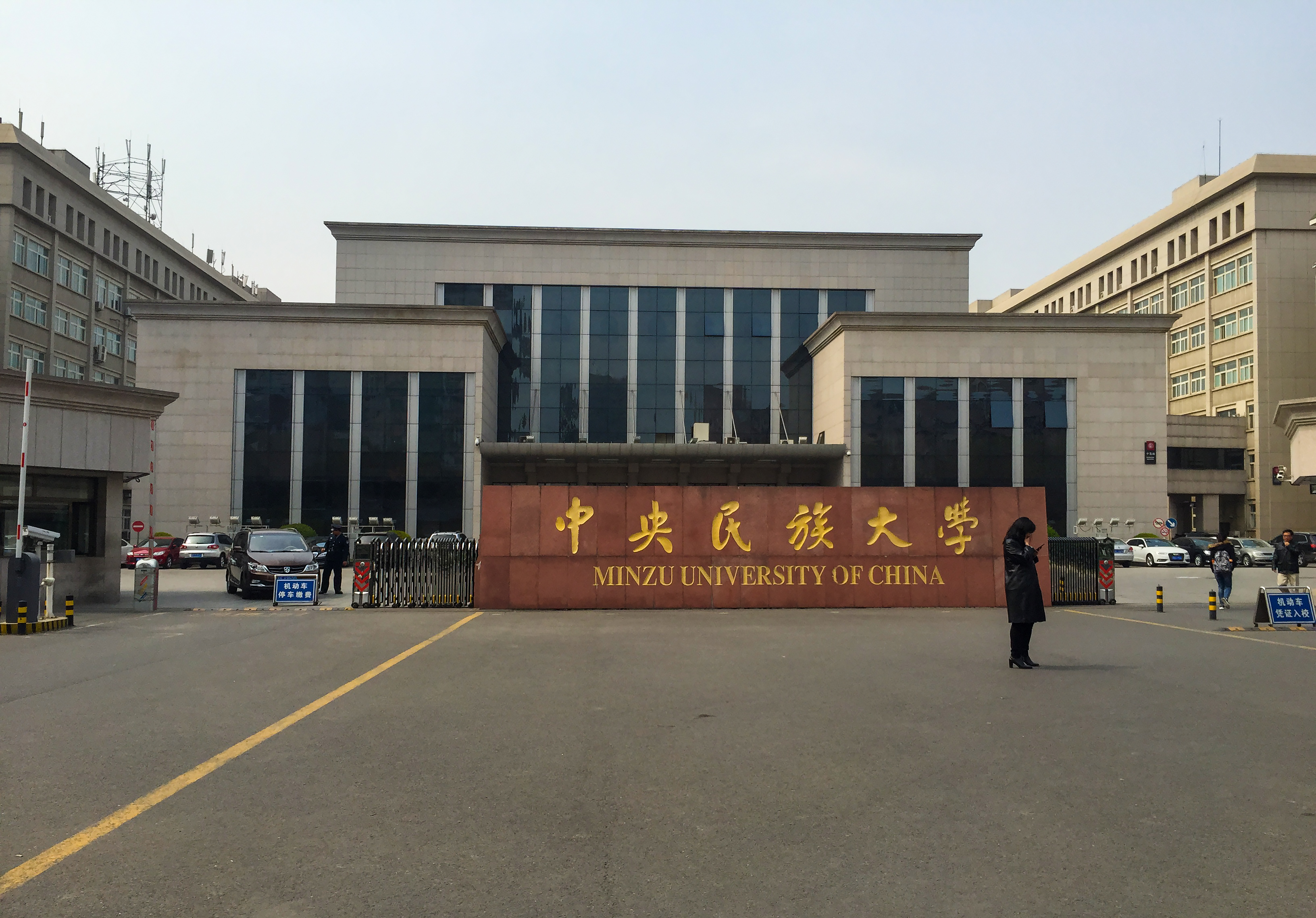
East gate of Minzu University of China in March 2017, showing both Chinese and English names of the university

The Chinese name has the meaning "central ethnic university", suggesting a national-level university focused on serving minority ethnic groups. The old English name translated the ethnic term as "nationalities", based on the term used in German and Russian language Marxist texts. On 20 November 2008, the university changed its official English name, apparently citing concerns that "central" might imply a location in the geographical centre of China (as it does in South-Central University for Nationalities), and the old name did not sound good. The name change of Renmin University has been cited as a precedent. The new name obscures the university's ethnic character, although student opinion has focused more on the fact that it makes obsolete the university's nickname, "the village". The Chinese word for village (Chinese: 村; pinyin: cūn) has a Hanyu pinyin spelling similar to the English abbreviation "CUN". In mainland Chinese culture, villages have homely connotations.

== History ==
University rankings

Global – Overall
- CWUR World: 1962
- CWTS World: 1579
- RUR World: 938
- USNWR Global: 1599

Regional – Overall
- QS Asia: 301-350
- QS BRICS: 271-280

National – Overall
- BCUR National: 80
- QS National: 90

The Chinese Communist Party first established a Nationalities Institute in its Civil War stronghold of Yan'an, in central China, in October 1941. In 1950-1952, this was merged with other ethnolinguistic and sociological departments, including elements of Peking University and Tsinghua University. The result was the Central Institute for Nationalities, which was established in 1951 and officially opened on 11 June 1952. The institute was assigned a large area of parkland on the outskirts of Beijing as its campus.

Both the Yan'an and Central institutes were intended to train cadres (officials) for ethnic minority areas, as well as providing a liberal arts education for promising students from the minorities. The cadres were to be trained so they could serve as liaisons between their minority communities and the Chinese government. Their research was and is intended to support the policies of the State Ethnic Affairs Commission. In its early years, the institute was caught up in the sensitive issue of classifying China's vast population into official ethnic groups, until the Cultural Revolution made conventional education almost impossible.

In 1999, it was granted "key university" status, as part of Project 211, which was supposed to identify 100 Chinese universities that would play leading roles in the 21st century. Since 2004, the university has been a participant in Project 985, a major national programme to raise 39 universities to world-class status. The campus has been almost completely reconstructed as part of this programme.

Meanwhile, Haidian has continued to develop as Beijing's main university district. CUN is now adjacent to the National Library of China and Zhongguancun, which local media refer to as "China's silicon valley." In 2006 a large site was acquired in Beijing's Fengtai district, and it is likely that a second campus will be constructed there.

== Rankings ==
In 2001, the People's Daily described CUN as "China's top academy for ethnic studies." Minzu University is ranked first by Shanghai Ranking in China among universities that originated as "ethnic minorities".

The university's emphasis on arts and humanities programs, particularly those majors related to ethnic minorities, has resulted in a relatively lower standing in global university rankings.

It also ranked 301-350th in Asia by the QS Asia University Rankings and 271-280th among BRICS countries by the QS BRICS University Rankings.

Internationally, Minzu University of China was ranked amongst top 2000 in the world by U.S. News & World Report Best Global Universities Ranking, the Center for World University Rankings (CWUR), the RUR World University Rankings, CWTS Leiden Ranking and University Ranking by Academic Performance.

== Admissions ==
To ensure that members of the 56 recognized minority groups are admitted the school has fixed quotas for each group. As of 2011, Minzu University accepts National Higher Education Entrance Examination (Gaokao) scores with a minimum in the mid-400s, or below the 50th percentile. Out of the Beijing universities, this has one of the lowest acceptance requirements.

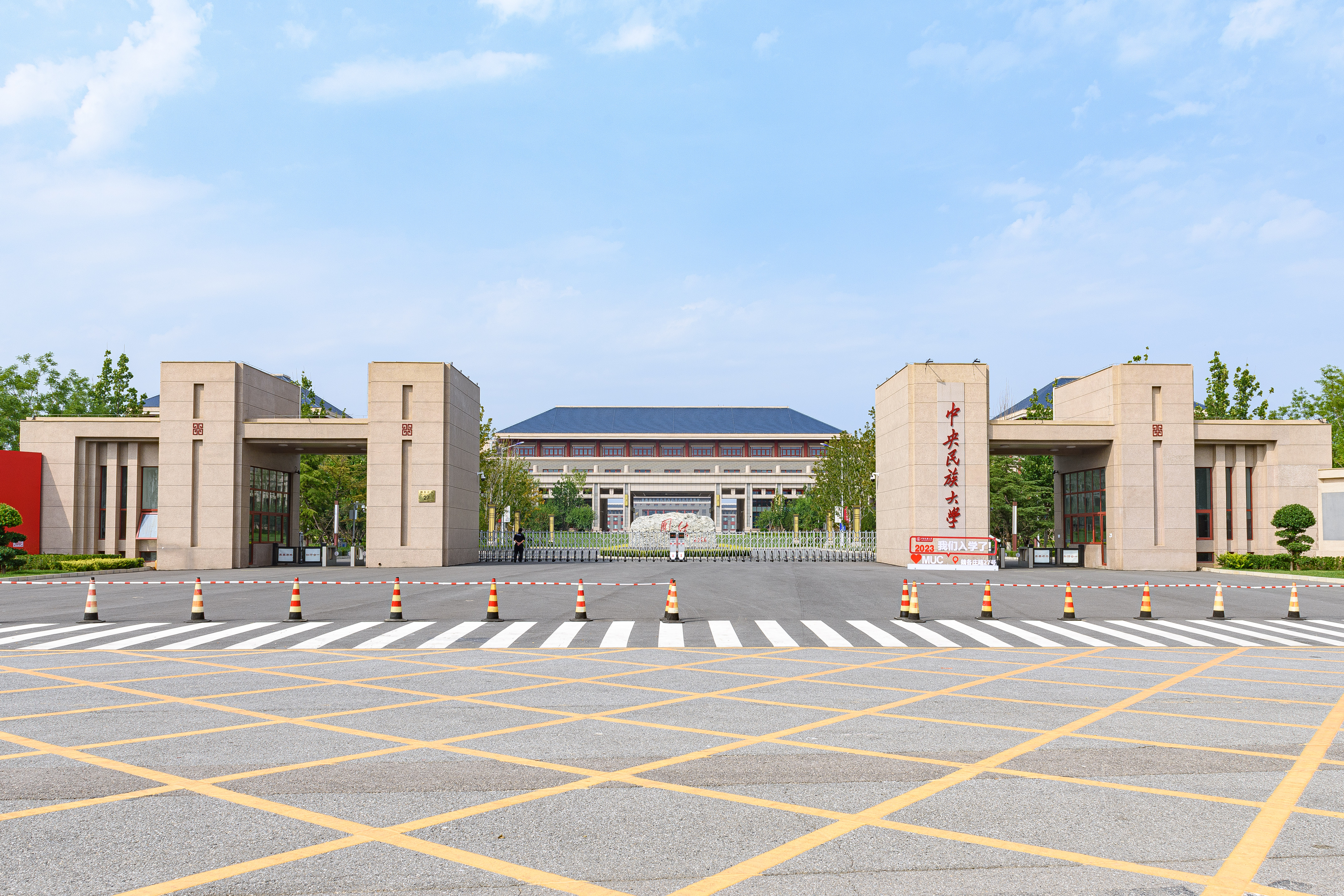
Fengtai campus of MUC in the town of Wangzuo

In China a university may admit a student whose score is barely below the cutoff score at its discretion. Sometimes minimum score levels were lowered to ensure that students from among the least-accepted minority groups would be permitted entry. The school offers remedial courses, including a one-year tutorial course that reviews the final year of senior secondary school and remedial Chinese courses to assist minority students to enroll.

The university has bridging programs to select minority students at Chinese secondary schools who are high achieving so they can attend Minzu University to prepare them for entering the highest ranked universities in Beijing. The government pays tuition for these programs.

== Notable students and faculty ==
- Arken Abdulla, Uyghur and Mandarin Chinese language pop singer-songwriter
- Kahar Barat, Uyghur-American historian
- Fei Xiaotong, sociologist and anthropologist
- D. O. Chaoke, Evenki linguist
- Han Geng, Mandopop singer and actor
- Song Zuying, an ethnic Miao singer of classical Chinese and Western songs, who performed at the 2008 Summer Olympics closing ceremony
- Ilham Tohti, an ethnic Uyghur, who was a professor of economics at Minzu University. He was detained by police in July 2009 following riots in Ürümqi In September 2014 he was sentenced to life in prison by the Urumqi People's Intermediate Court.
- Ulan Tuya (born 1983), Chinese singer/songwriter
- Wu'erkaixi, dissident, student leader of the 1989 Tiananmen protests
- Zhang Chengzhi, writer, once audited a class in Kazakh
- Kao Chin Su-mei, Taiwanese Aborigine actress, singer and member for parliament in the Legislative Yuan of the Republic of China (Taiwan) for Highland Aborigines electoral district
- Mi Na, contemporary artist

== See also ==
- Demographics of Beijing

Other universities for ethnic minorities in the People's Republic of China:

- South-Central University for Nationalities
- Southwest Minzu University
- Guangxi University for Nationalities
- Dalian Minzu University
- Xizang Minzu University
- Northwest Minzu University
- North Minzu University
- Guizhou Minzu University
- Yunnan Minzu University
- Qinghai University for Nationalities
- Inner Mongolia University for Nationalities
- Hubei Minzu University
- Hohhot Minzu College

== Notes ==
- The Central University for Nationalities (undated, but c.2000). Beijing: CUN International Relations Office. A prospectus for Chinese and foreign students; the source for many of the dates and statistics in the first section.
