= Yungang =

Yungang may refer to the following places in China:

== Beijing ==
- Yungang Subdistrict, Subdistrict in Fengtai District, Beijing
- Yungang station, subway station on Line 1 under construction in Yungang Subdistrict, Fengtai District, Beijing

== Shanxi ==
- Datong Yungang International Airport, major airport of Datong, Shanxi Province
- Yungang District, in Datong, Shanxi Province
- Yungang Grottoes, in Datong, Shanxi Province
