= Qiu Shusen =

Chinese historian (1937–2019)

Qiu Shusen (Chinese: 邱树森; 4 July 1937 – 20 November 2019) was a Chinese historian who specialized in the history of the Mongols and the Yuan dynasty, and the history of China's ethnic minorities, especially the Hui people. He served as Professor and Chair of the Department of History at Nanjing University, North Minzu University, and Jinan University.

== Biography ==
Qiu was born on 4 July 1937 in Suzhou, Jiangsu, Republic of China. He graduated from the Department of History of Nanjing University in 1959, and continued his studies at the graduate program of the department, where he was advised by the renowned historian Han Rulin. After completing his studies in 1963, he became a faculty member at the university, and later served as Chair of the Department of History from 1984 to 1988.

In 1988, Qiu became a Professor and Chair of the Department of History of North Minzu University in Yinchuan. In 1993, he transferred to Jinan University in Guangzhou, still serving as Professor and Chair of the Department of History. After retiring, he taught as an adjunct professor at Macau University of Science and Technology.

Qiu was a specialist in the history of the Mongols and the Yuan dynasty, and the history of China's ethnic minorities, especially the Hui people. In 1992, he was awarded a special pension by the State Council of the People's Republic of China for distinguished scholars. He served as Vice President of the China Yuan Dynasty Historical Research Society.

Qiu published more than 20 monographs and reference works, and over 200 research papers. His monographs include History of the Hui People of China 中国回族史, A Brief History of China's Ethnic Minorities 中国少数民族简史, A Gazetteer of the Hui Culture 回族文化志, A Brief Investigation of the Cultural History of the Yuan Dynasty 元代文化史探微. He also edited Great Dictionary of the Yuan Dynasty of China 中国元史大辞典, Dictionary of Chinese Historical Official Titles 中国历代职官辞典, Dictionary of Famous People in Chinese History 中国历代名人辞典. Many of his works were cited by The Cambridge History of China, Volume 6: Alien Regimes and Border States.

Qiu died on 20 November 2019 in Guangzhou, aged 82.
