= National Ethnic Affairs Commission =

Chinese Communist Party body

National Ethnic Affairs Commission of the People's Republic of China
- 中华人民共和国国家民族事务委员会; Zhōnghuá Rénmín Gònghéguó Guójiā Mínzú Shìwù Wěiyuánhuì
- Logo of the National Ethnic Affairs Commission

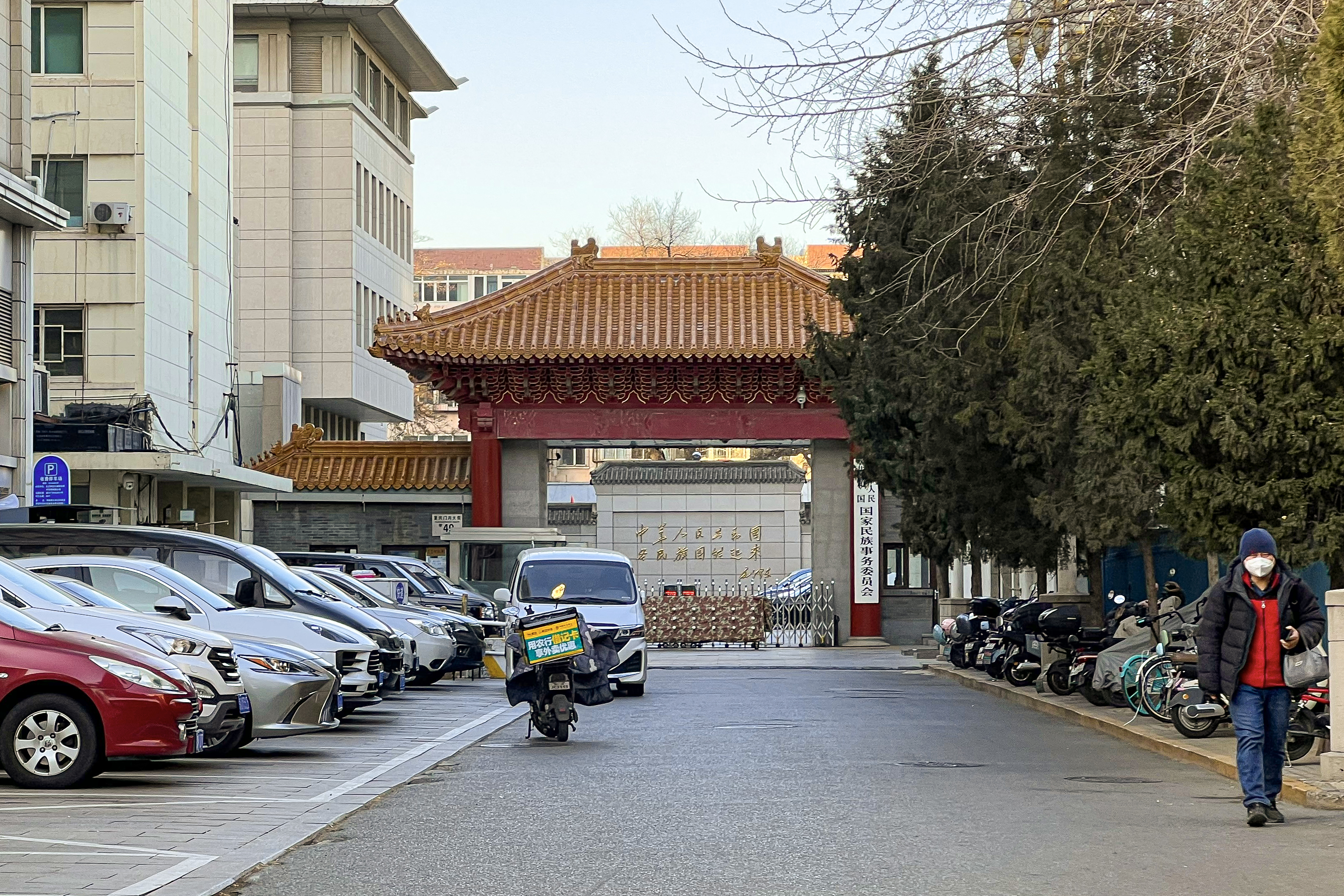
- Headquarters of the National Ethnic Affairs Commission

Agency overview
- Formed: 1949; 77 years ago
- Jurisdiction: Government of China
- Headquarters: Beijing
- Minister responsible: Pan Yue, Director of the National Ethnic Affairs Commission
- Parent agency: United Front Work Department of the Central Committee of the Chinese Communist Party
- Child agency: Publishing House of Minority Nationalities
- Website: www.neac.gov.cn

National Ethnic Affairs Commission

Chinese name
- Simplified Chinese: 中华人民共和国国家民族事务委员会
- Traditional Chinese: 中華人民共和國國家民族事務委員會
- Literal meaning: National Ethnic Affairs Commission of the People's Republic of China
Transcriptions
Standard Mandarin
- Hanyu Pinyin: Zhōnghuá Rénmín Gònghéguó Guójiā Mínzú Shìwù Wěiyuánhuì

Alternative Chinese name
- Simplified Chinese: 国家民委
- Traditional Chinese: 國家民委
- Literal meaning: National Ethnic-Commission
Transcriptions
Standard Mandarin
- Hanyu Pinyin: Guójiā Mínwěi

Tibetan name
- Tibetan: ཀྲུང་ཧྭ་མི་དམངས་སྤྱི་མཐུན་རྒྱལ་ཁབ་ཀྱི་རྒྱལ་ཁབ་མི་རིགས་དོན་གཅོད་ཨུ་ཡོན་ལྷན་ཁང་

Zhuang name
- Zhuang: Cunghvaz Yinzminz Gunghozgoz Guekgya Minzcuz Swvu Veijyenzvei

Mongolian name
- Mongolian script: ᠪᠥᠬᠥᠳᠡ ᠨᠠᠶᠢᠷᠠᠮᠳᠠᠬᠤ ᠳᠤᠮᠳᠠᠳᠤ ᠠᠷᠠᠳ ᠤᠯᠤᠰ ᠤᠨ ᠦᠨᠳᠦᠰᠦᠲᠡᠨ ᠦ ᠬᠡᠷᠡᠭ ᠡᠷᠬᠢᠯᠡᠬᠦ ᠬᠣᠷᠢᠶ᠎ᠠ

Uyghur name
- Uyghur: جۇڭخۇا خەلق جۇمھۇرىيتى دۆلەت مىللەت ئىشلىرى كومىتېتى

The National Ethnic Affairs Commission (NEAC), also called the State Ethnic Affairs Commission (SEAC), is a body under the United Front Work Department of the Central Committee of the Chinese Communist Party that is responsible for administering the Chinese ethnic policies, researching ethnological theories, carrying out ethnic work and education, supervising the implementation and improvement of the system of regional ethnic autonomy.

== History ==
In 1949, the Ethnic Affairs Commission of the Central People's Government (Chinese: 中央人民政府民族事务委员会) was established. In 1954, the Ethnic Affairs Commission of the Central People's Government was renamed the Ethnic Affairs Commission of the People's Republic of China (Chinese: 中华人民共和国民族事务委员会). The PRC Ethnic Affairs Commission was abolished in 1970. The State Ethnic Affairs Commission of the People's Republic of China (Chinese: 中华人民共和国国家民族事务委员会) was established. Since 1978, it has been a constituent department of the State Council.

The National Ethnic Affairs Commission was put under the leadership of the United Front Work Department of the Central Committee of the Chinese Communist Party in March 2018 as part of a series of institutional reforms. The National Ethnic Affairs Commission remains as a constituent department of the State Council.

On August 31, 2020, according to the National Development and Reform Commission's "Implementation Opinions on Comprehensively Pushing Forward the Reform of Delinking Trade Associations and Administrative Organs", the China Association of Ethnic Folk Crafts and Arts Artists, the China Ethnic Economy Promotion Association for Foreign Cooperation, and the National Association of Ethnic Secondary Education, formerly under the supervision of the State Ethnic Affairs Commission, were separated from the State Ethnic Affairs Commission.

In 2022, the NEAC launched a publication called DeepChina and its domestic Chinese edition Dao Zhonghua (Chinese: 道中華) to conduct "public opinion struggle" and "cognitive warfare" in support of the CCP's ethnic policies. In 2025, the State Council granted NEAC authority to design and pilot a new and explicitly "political" ethnographic field of study at 15 universities that emphasizes "community" between Han and non-Han ethnicities in mainland China.

== Organization ==
According to the Provisions on the Functional Configuration, Internal Organizations and Staffing of the National Ethnic Affairs Commission and the Approval of the Central Editorial Office on Adjusting the Organizational Establishment of the National Ethnic Affairs Commission, the NEAC has set up the following organizations:

=== Internal Organizations ===
- General Office
- Division of Coordination and Promotion
- Division of Theory and Research
- Division of Policies and Regulations
- Division of Promotion of National Unity
- Division of Joint Development
- Division of Culture and Publicity
- Division of Education
- Division of International Exchange (Hong Kong, Macao and Taiwan Office)
- Division of Personnel
- Division Party Committee of Organizations
- Bureau of Retired Cadres

=== Directly Affiliated Organizations ===
- Public Opinion Center (Chinese: 舆情中心)
- Ancient Book Processing and Research Office (Chinese: 古籍整理研究室)
- Organization Service Center (Organization Service Bureau)

=== Directly Affiliated Cultural institutions ===
- Central Academy for Ethnic Cadres (Chinese: 中央民族干部学院)
- China Nationalities Language Translation Center (China Nationalities Language Translation Bureau)
- China National Ethnic Song and Dance Ensemble
- Publishing House of Minority Nationalities
- Journal of National Unity
- Cultural Palace of Nationalities
- China Ethnic Museum
- China Ethnic Newspaper

=== Directly Affiliated Higher Education Institutions ===
- Central University for Nationalities
- South–Central Minzu University
- Southwest University for Nationalities
- Northwest University for Nationalities
- North Minzu University
- Dalian Minzu University

=== Directly Affiliated Enterprise Units ===
- China National Culture Publishing House Ltd.

== Leadership ==
No.	Portrait	Name	Took office	Left office	Important offices held during tenure	Highest office held	Notes	Ref.
Director of the Ethnic Affairs Commission of the Central People's Government
1		Li Weihan	19 October 1949	28 September 1954	Secretary-General of the State Council, Head of the United Front Work Department	Member of the Politburo Standing Committee, Vice Chairman of the Standing Committee of the National People's Congress, Vice Chairman of the Chinese People's Political Consultative Conference Deputy Director of the Central Advisory Commission	Deputy-state level, Han	
Director of the Ethnic Affairs Commission of the People's Republic of China
2		Ulanhu	28 September 1954	22 June 1970	Vice Premier of the State Council	Vice President of China	Deputy-state level, Mongol	
Director of the National Ethnic Affairs Commission of the People's Republic of China
3		Yang Jingren	5 March 1978	20 January 1986	Deputy Head of the United Front Work Department Vice Premier of the State Council since September 1980, Vice Chairman of the Chinese People's Political Consultative Conference since June 1983		Deputy-state level, Hui	
4		Ismail Amat	20 January 1986	18 March 1998	Vice Chairman of the Chinese People's Political Consultative Conference since April 1988 State Councilor since 1993	Vice Chairman of the Standing Committee of the National People's Congress	Deputy-state level, Uyghur	
5		Li Dezhu	18 March 1998	17 March 2008	Deputy Head of the United Front Work Department		Korean	
6		Yang Jing	17 March 2008	16 March 2013	Deputy Head of the United Front Work Department Secretary of the CCP Secretariat since November 2012	State Councilor and Secretary-General of the State Council	Deputy-state level, Mongol	
7		Wang Zhengwei	16 March 2013	28 April 2016	Vice Chairman of the Chinese People's Political Consultative Conference Deputy Head of the United Front Work Department	Vice Chairman of the Chinese People's Political Consultative Conference	Hui	
8		Bagatur	28 April 2016	26 December 2020	Vice Chairman of the Chinese People's Political Consultative Conference since March 2018	Vice Chairman of the Chinese People's Political Consultative Conference	Mongol	
9		Chen Xiaojiang	26 December 2020	24 June 2022	Deputy Head of the United Front Work Department	Executive Deputy Head of the United Front Work Department	Han	
10		Pan Yue	24 June 2022	Incumbent	Deputy Head of the United Front Work Department		Han	

== See also ==
- List of ethnic groups in China
- Zhonghua minzu

=== Related PRC authorities ===
- National People's Congress Ethnic Affairs Committee
- State Administration for Religious Affairs
