= China Ethnic Museum =

Museum in Beijing, China

Coordinates: 39°59′2″N 116°23′25″E

China Nationalities Museum
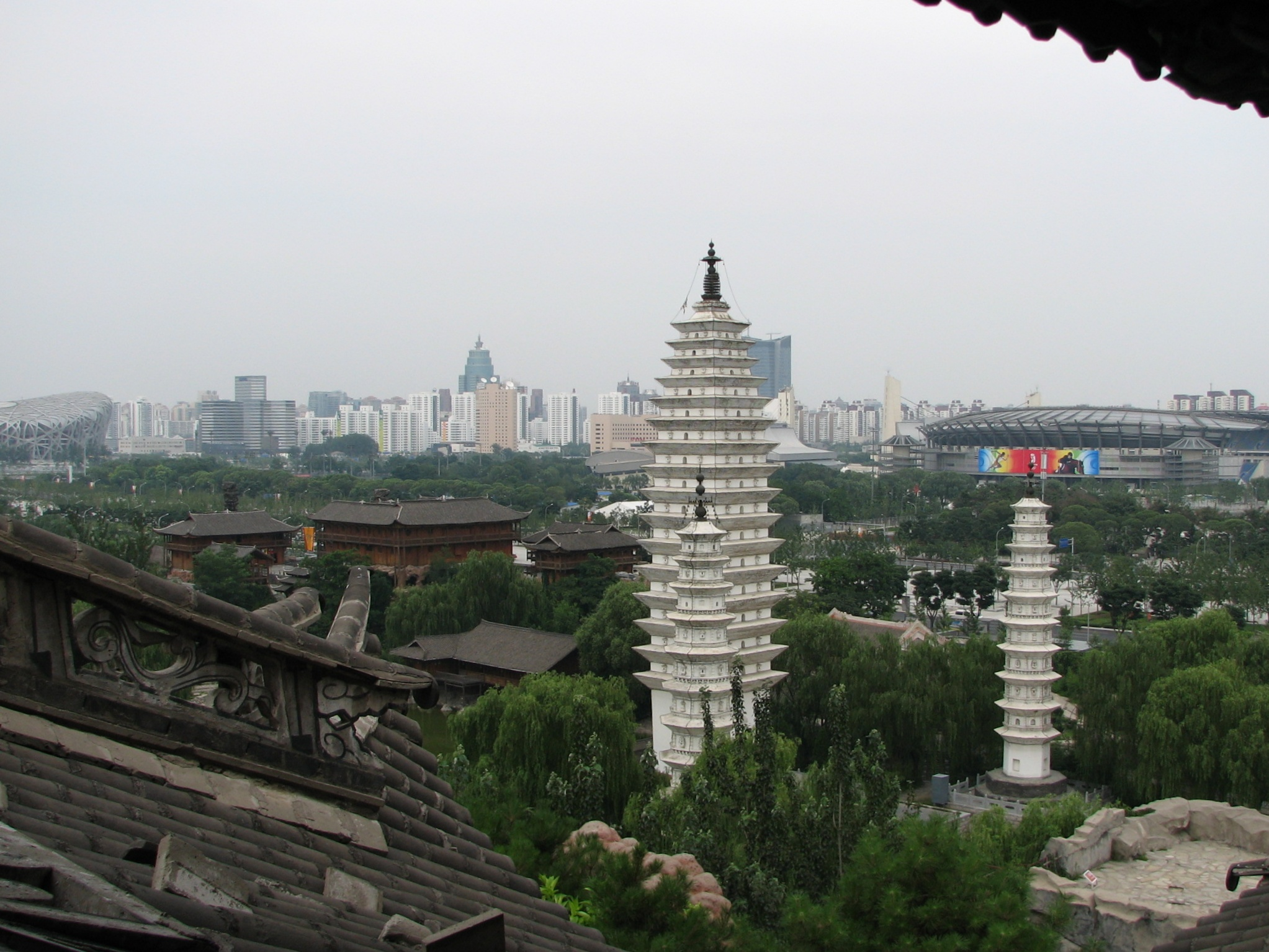
- Traditional Chinese: 中華民族博物館
- Simplified Chinese: 中华民族博物馆
Transcriptions
Standard Mandarin
- Hanyu Pinyin: Zhōnghuá Mínzú Bówùguǎn

Chinese Ethnic Culture Park
- Traditional Chinese: 中華民族園
- Simplified Chinese: 中华民族园
Transcriptions
Standard Mandarin
- Hanyu Pinyin: Zhōnghuá Mínzú Yuán

The China Ethnic Museum (Chinese: 中华民族博物馆; pinyin: Zhōnghuá Mínzú Bówùguǎn; also called Chinese Ethnic Culture Park, Chinese: 中华民族园; pinyin: Zhōnghuá Mínzú Yuán) is a museum in Beijing, China, located just to the west of the Olympic Green. It features displays of the daily life and architecture of China's 56 ethnic groups. It is managed by the National Ethnic Affairs Commission of the United Front Work Department.

As stated on its website, the museum's goals are as follows:

- To demonstrate ethnic architecture
- To preserve ethnic relics
- To spread ethnic knowledge
- To study ethnic heritage
- To enhance ethnic culture
- To promote unity of all Chinese ethnic groups

Construction began in October 1992. The North Section was opened to the public on June 18, 1994, and the South Section was opened in September 2001. The museum covers approximately 50 hectares and so far comprises 56 ethnic villages.

== See also ==
- China Folk Culture Village
- Vietnam Museum of Ethnology
- Zhonghua minzu – It is may mean "Chinese nation," but depending on the context, it may also mean "Chinese ethnicity".
