= Weigongcun station =

Beijing Subway station

Coordinates: 39°57′28″N 116°19′24″E

Weigongcun 魏公村
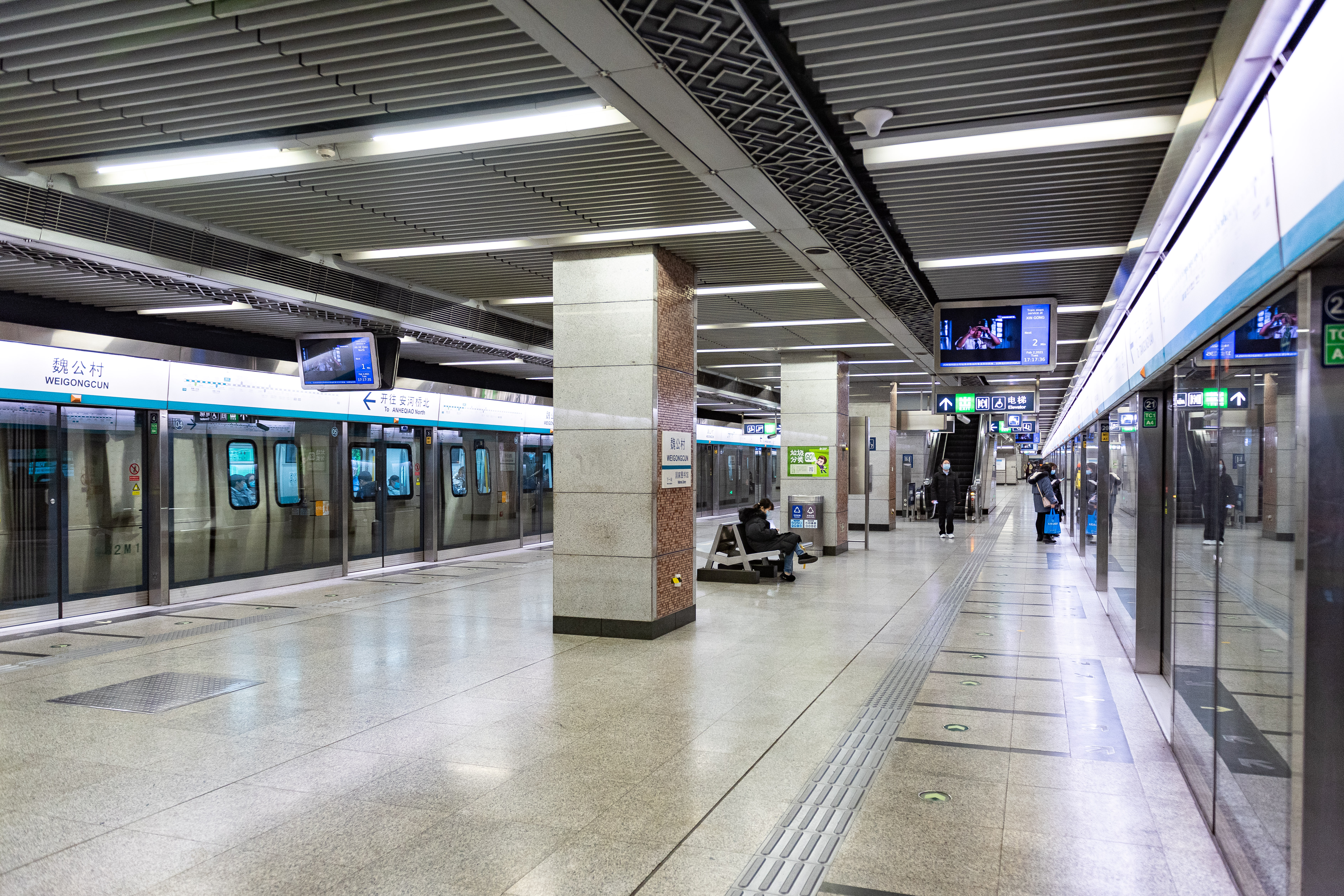
- Platform

General information
- Location: Zhongguancun South Street and Weigongcun Street (魏公村路); Haidian District, Beijing; China
- Operator: Beijing MTR Corporation Limited
- Line: Line 4
- Platforms: 2 (1 island platform)
- Tracks: 2

Construction
- Structure type: Underground
- Accessible: Yes

History
- Opened: September 28, 2009

Services
Preceding station	Beijing Subway	Following station
Renmin Univ. towards Anheqiaobei	Line 4	National Library towards Tiangong Yuan
Location
- Location within Beijing

Weigongcun Station (Chinese: 魏公村站; pinyin: Wèigōngcūn Zhàn) is a station on Line 4 of the Beijing Subway.

== Station layout ==
The station has an underground island platform.

== Exits ==
There are 3 exits, lettered A, B, and D. Exit A is accessible.
