= Ethnic Publishing House =

Chinese publishing company

Coordinates: 39°57′54″N 116°25′59″E

- Parent company: National Ethnic Affairs Commission of the United Front Work Department
- Founded: January 15, 1953; 73 years ago
- Founder: National Ethnic Affairs Commission
- Country of origin: China
- Headquarters location: Dongcheng District, Beijing, China
- Key people: Yu Binxi (director and editor-in-chief)
- Publication types: Academic publishing

The Publishing House of Minority Nationalities (Chinese: 民族出版社; pinyin: Mínzú Chūbǎnshè) is a publishing house established on January 15, 1953, as a division of the National Ethnic Affairs Commission of the United Front Work Department, and focused on academic publishing. Its headquarters are located in Dongcheng District, Beijing, China. Its current director and editor-in-chief is Yu Binxi (Chinese: 禹宾熙).
