= Ulan Tuya =

Chinese singer and songwriter

Ulan Tuya/Wulan Tuya
- Born: September 7, 1983 (age 43); Horqin Right Middle Banner, Inner Mongolia, China
- Genre: Pop
- Occupation: Singer
- Instrument: Vocals
- Years active: 2011–present

Ulan Tuya (simplified Chinese: 乌兰图雅; traditional Chinese: 烏蘭圖雅; pinyin: wū lán tú yǎ; born September 7, 1983, also known as Ulan Tuyo or Wulan Tuya) is a Chinese singer and songwriter.

In 2014, she attended the 2014 CCTV Spring Festival Gala with her teacher, Ri-Na Wu, where they performed a rendition of her hit "Horse Pole." In 2019, she attended the 2019 CCTV Spring Festival Gala with Shi Peng, Sha Yi, Hu Ke, Yun Duo, and Yun Fei, and performed the song "Praise the New Era" at the live broadcast party.

A number of her songs make use of the Morin khuur, a traditional ethnic Mongolian instrument.

== Early life and career ==
Ulan Tuya was born on September 7, 1983, in Horqin Grassland, Inner Mongolia, China and graduated from Minzu University of China.

In June 2011, she officially entered the entertainment business with the release of the song "Horse Pole" (simplified Chinese: 套马杆; traditional Chinese: 套馬杆; pinyin: tào mǎ gān), which allowed her to gain more attention.

== Discography ==
=== Studio albums ===
- Horse Pole (套马杆) (2011)
- Praise the New Era (点赞新时代) (2019)
- Phoenix Flies (凤凰飞) (2011)
- Hit Song for Love (火辣辣的情歌) (2011)
- Love Brother in Grassland (草原情哥哥) (2011)
- Long Tune of World Music (世界音乐长调) (2012)
- Beautiful Grassland (醉美草原) (2012)
- Mom's Love (妈妈的恩情) (2012)
- Vanilla (原香草) (2013)
- Golden Grassland (金色的草原) (2012)

=== Singles ===
- Girl of Arxan (阿尔山的姑娘) (2015)
- Standing on the grassland and looking at Beijing (站在草原望北京) (2012)
- Mongolian Flower

== Concerts ==
Year	Concert	Date	City	Venue	Link
2015	"Ulan Tuya huakaisiji" concert in Jilin	January 15	Jilin	Jilin	

Year	Concert	Date	City	Venue	Link
2016	"Ulan Tuya huakaisiji" concert in Beijing	June 5	Beijing	Beijing	

Year	Concert	Date	City	Venue	Link
2016	"Ulan Tuya huakaisiji" concert in Nanjing	September 14	Nanjing	Nanjing	

Year	Concert	Date	City	Venue	Link
2016	"Ulan Tuya huakaisiji" concert in Shanghai	September 15	Shanghai	Shanghai	

Year	Concert	Date	City	Venue	Link
2016	"Ulan Tuya huakaisiji" concert in Changsha	September 18	Changsha	Changsha	

Year	Concert	Date	City	Venue	Link
2016	"Ulan Tuya huakaisiji" concert in Haikou	October 21	Haikou	Haikou	

Year	Concert	Date	City	Venue	Link
2016	"Ulan Tuya huakaisiji" concert in Guangzhou	November 5	Guangzhou	Guangzhou	

Year	Concert	Date	City	Venue	Link
2016	"Ulan Tuya huakaisiji" concert in Chengdu	November 6	Chengdu	Chengdu	

Year	Concert	Date	City	Venue	Link
2016	"Ulan Tuya huakaisiji" concert in Handan	November 25	Handan	Handan	

Year	Concert	Date	City	Venue	Link
2017	"Ulan Tuya huakaisiji" concert in Oakland	May 6	Oakland	Oakland	

Year	Concert	Date	City	Venue	Link
2017	"Ulan Tuya huakaisiji" concert in Arxan	July 4	Arxan	Arxan	

Year	Concert	Date	City	Venue	Link
2017	"Ulan Tuya huakaisiji" concert in Weihai	October 31	Weihai	Weihai	

Year	Concert	Date	City	Venue	Link
2017	"Ulan Tuya huakaisiji" concert in Ulanhot	July 5	Ulanhot	Ulanhot	

Year	Concert	Date	City	Venue	Link
2017	"Ulan Tuya huakaisiji" concert in Dongguan	October 8	Dongguan	Dongguan	

Year	Concert	Date	City	Venue	Link
2017	"Ulan Tuya huakaisiji" concert in Huizhou	October 10	Huizhou	Huizhou	

Year	Concert	Date	City	Venue	Link
2017	"Ulan Tuya huakaisiji" concert in Xiamen	October 12	Xiamen	Xiamen	

Year	Concert	Date	City	Venue	Link
2017	"Ulan Tuya huakaisiji" concert in Yichun	October 15	Yichun	Yichun	

Year	Concert	Date	City	Venue	Link
2017	"Ulan Tuya huakaisiji" concert in Chongqing	October 18	Chongqing	Chongqing	

Year	Concert	Date	City	Venue	Link
2017	"Ulan Tuya huakaisiji" concert in Taizhou	October 21	Taizhou	Taizhou	

Year	Concert	Date	City	Venue	Link
2017	"Ulan Tuya huakaisiji" concert in Zhuji	October 24	Zhuji	Zhuji	

Year	Concert	Date	City	Venue	Link
2017	"Ulan Tuya huakaisiji" concert in Handan	October 27	Handan	Handan	

Year	Concert	Date	City	Venue	Link
2017	"Ulan Tuya huakaisiji" concert in Yantai	October 29	Yantai	Yantai	

Year	Concert	Date	City	Venue	Link
2018	"Ulan Tuya huakaisiji" concert in Canada	February 25	Canada	Canada	

Year	Concert	Date	City	Venue	Link
2018	"Ulan Tuya huakaisiji" concert in Chongqing	May 22	Chongqing	Chongqing	

Year	Concert	Date	City	Venue	Link
2018	"Ulan Tuya huakaisiji" concert in Changsha	May 25	Changsha	Changsha	

Year	Concert	Date	City	Venue	Link
2018	"Ulan Tuya huakaisiji" concert in Zhuzhou	May 27	Zhuzhou	Zhuzhou	

Year	Concert	Date	City	Venue	Link
2018	"Ulan Tuya huakaisiji" concert in Henan	May 29	Henan	Henan	

Year	Concert	Date	City	Venue	Link
2018	"Ulan Tuya huakaisiji" concert in Hengshui	June 2	Hengshui	Hengshui	

Year	Concert	Date	City	Venue	Link
2018	"Ulan Tuya huakaisiji" concert in Bingzhou	June 5	Bingzhou	Bingzhou	

Year	Concert	Date	City	Venue	Link
2018	"Ulan Tuya huakaisiji" concert in Huai'an	June 8	Huai'an	Huai'an	

Year	Concert	Date	City	Venue	Link
2018	"Ulan Tuya huakaisiji" concert in Changzhou	June 10	Changzhou	Changzhou	

Year	Concert	Date	City	Venue	Link
2018	"Ulan Tuya huakaisiji" concert in Shanghai	June 13	Shanghai	Shanghai	

Year	Concert	Date	City	Venue	Link
2018	"Ulan Tuya huakaisiji" concert in Zhoushan	June 14	Zhoushan	Zhoushan	

Year	Concert	Date	City	Venue	Link
2018	"Ulan Tuya huakaisiji" concertin Hefei	June 17	Hefei	Hefei	

Year	Concert	Date	City	Venue	Link
2018	"Ulan Tuya huakaisiji" concert in Kunshan	June 20	Kunshan	Kunshan	

Year	Concert	Date	City	Venue	Link
2018	"Ulan Tuya huakaisiji" concert in Wuxi	June 22	Wuxi	Wuxi	

Year	Concert	Date	City	Venue	Link
2018	"Ulan Tuya huakaisiji" concert in Lishui	June 23	Lishui	Lishui	

Year	Concert	Date	City	Venue	Link
2018	"Ulan Tuya huakaisiji" concert in Xiamen	June 27	Xiamen	Xiamen	

Year	Concert	Date	City	Venue	Link
2018	"Ulan Tuya huakaisiji" concert in Beijing, Working body	September 7	Beijing	Working body	

Year	Concert	Date	City	Venue	Link
2018	"Ulan Tuya huakaisiji" concert in Beijing, poly theatre	November 4	Beijing	poly theatre	

== Awards ==
Year	Nominee / work	Award	Result
2019	Praise the New Era	The third China weifang golden kite international micro film competition best music micro film award	Won

Year	Nominee / work	Award	Result
2018	Standing on the grassland and looking at Beijing	Selected into 40 representative songs of China's reform and opening up 40 years	Won
