= Renmin Univ. station =

Metro station in Beijing, China

Renmin Univ. 人民大学
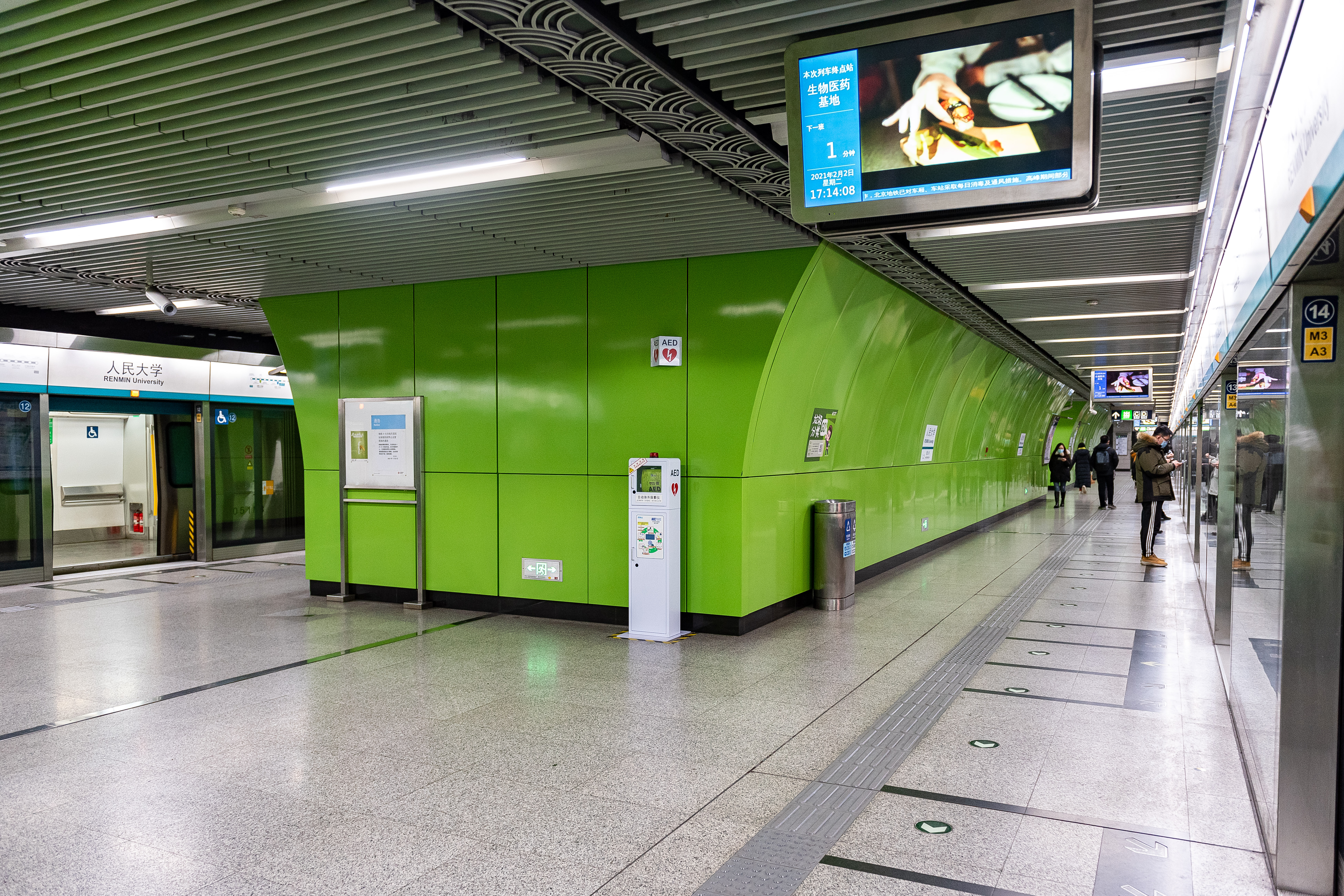
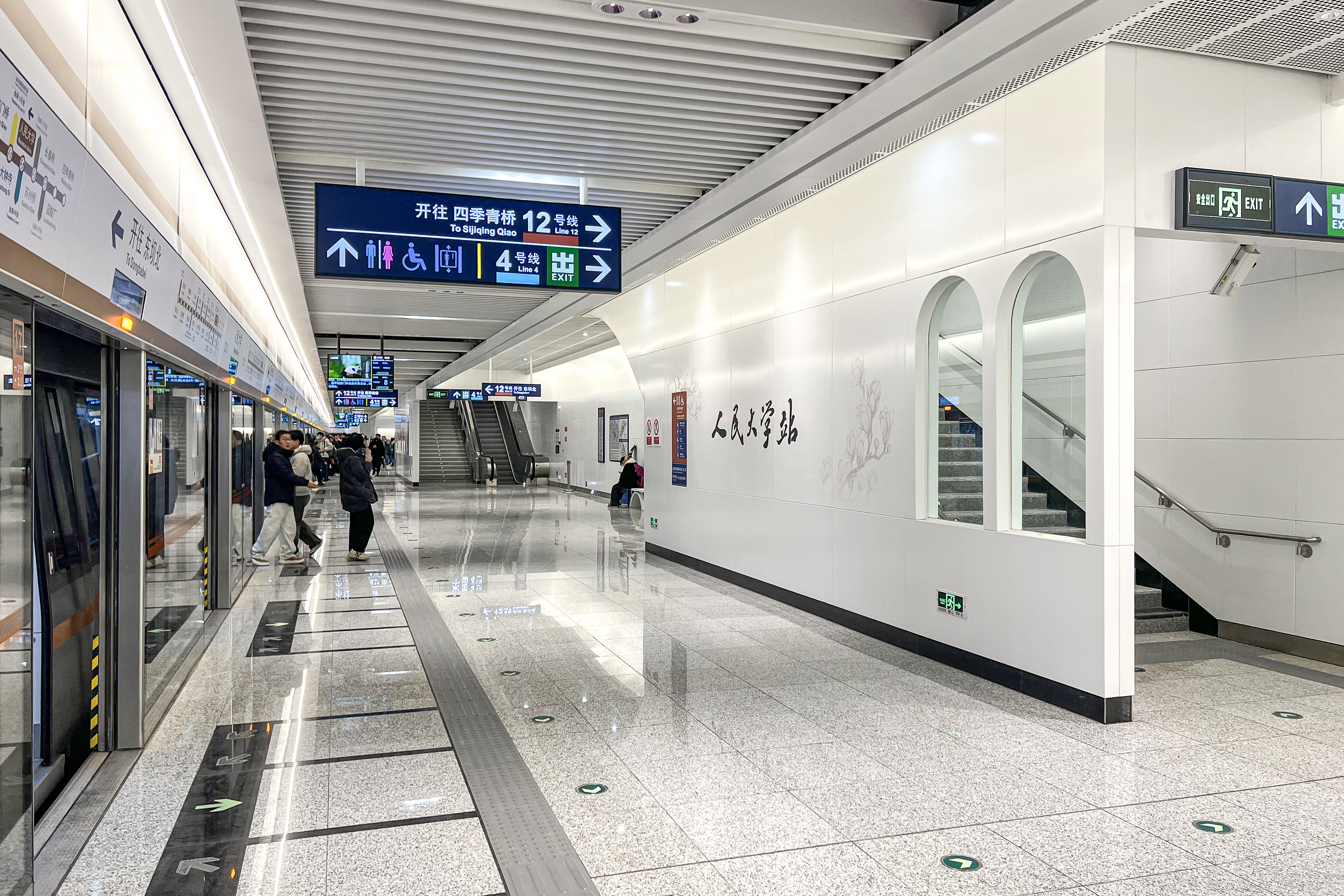
- Line 4 platform Line 12 platform

General information
- Location: Sitong Bridge (North 3rd Ring Road West and Zhongguancun Street / Zhongguancun South Street); Haidian District, Beijing; China
- Coordinates: 39°58′01″N 116°19′17″E
- Operator: Beijing MTR Corporation Limited; Beijing Subway
- Lines: Line 4; Line 12
- Platforms: 4 (1 island platform and 1 split island platform)
- Tracks: 4

Construction
- Structure type: Underground
- Accessible: Yes

History
- Opened: Line 4: September 28, 2009; 16 years ago; Line 12: December 15, 2024; 20 months ago
- Former names: Renmin University, Renmin Daxue (Renmin Univ.)

Services
Preceding station	Beijing Subway	Following station
Haidian Huangzhuang towards Anheqiaobei	Line 4	Weigongcun towards Tiangong Yuan
Suzhou Qiao towards Sijiqing Qiao	Line 12	Dazhong Si towards Dongbabei
Location
- Location within Beijing

Renmin Univ. Station (simplified Chinese: 人民大学站; traditional Chinese: 人民大學站; pinyin: Rénmín Dàxué Zhàn) is an interchange station between Line 4 and Line 12 of the Beijing Subway. It is located near the east gate of Renmin University.

== Station layout ==
The station has an underground island platform for Line 4 and a split island platform for Line 12.

== Exits ==
=== Line 4 ===
There are 5 exits, lettered A1, A2, B, C, and D. Exit B has an accessible elevator.

=== Line 12 ===
There are 2 exits, lettered E and F.

== Gallery ==
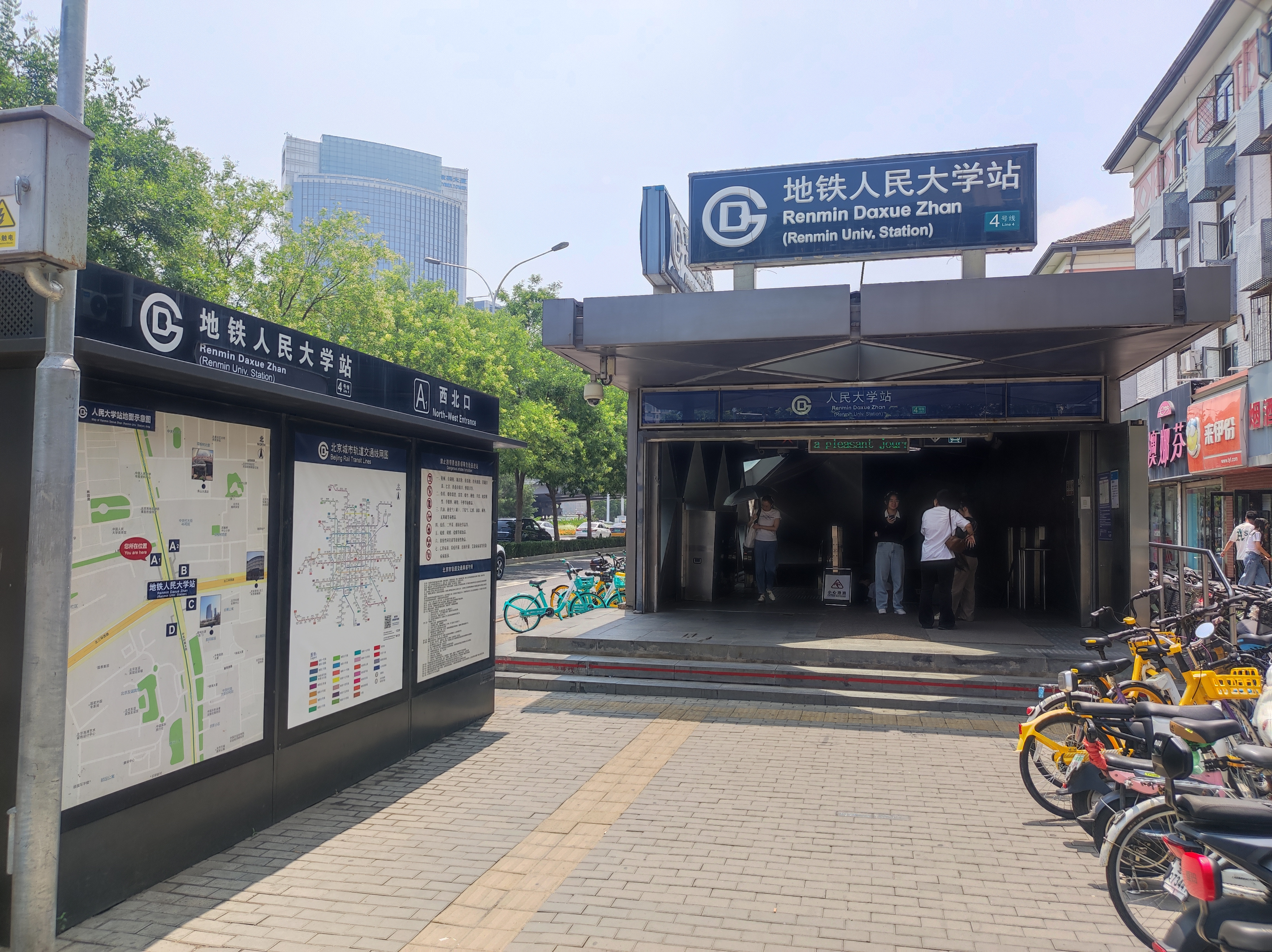
Exit A1, Line 4

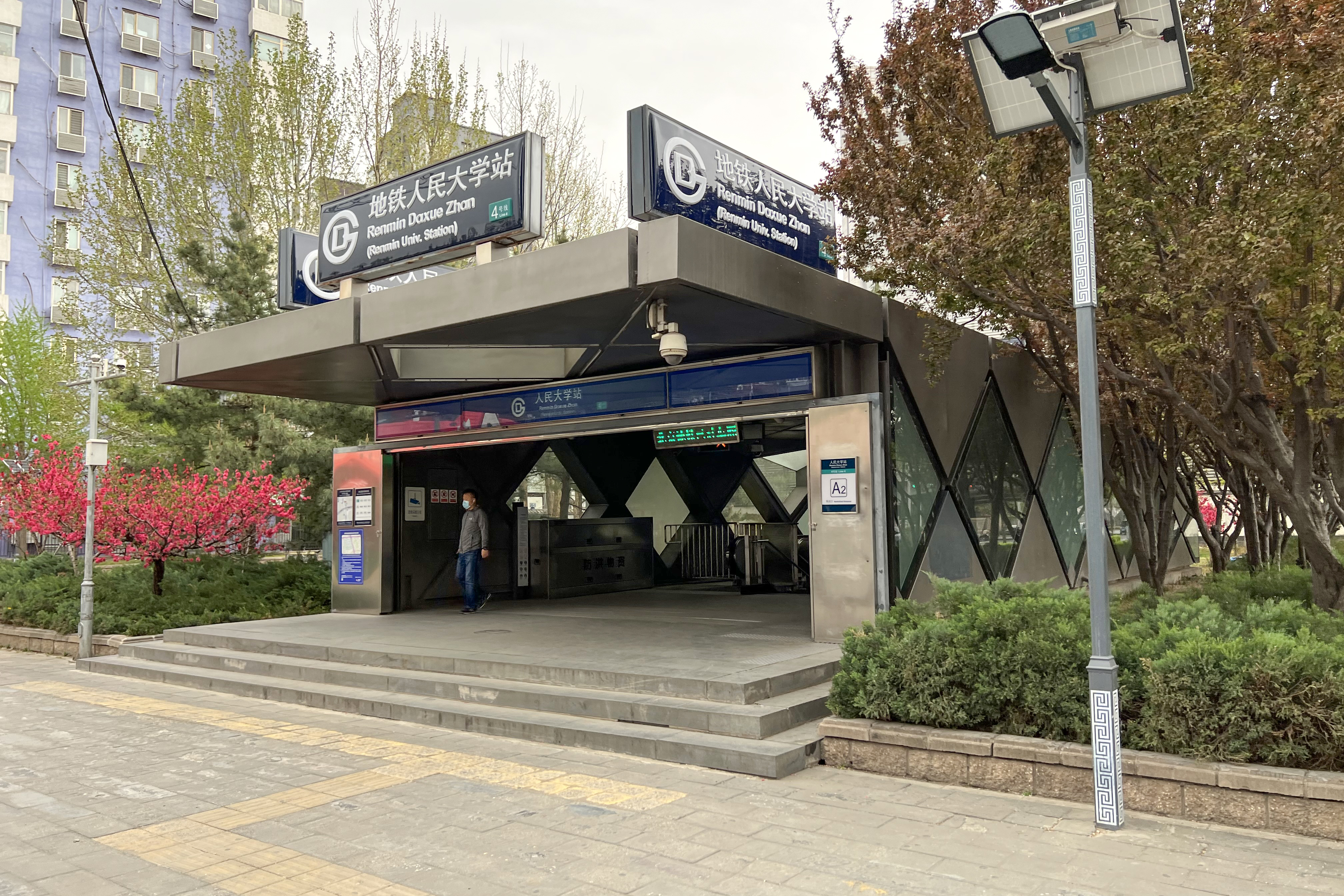
Exit A2, Line 4

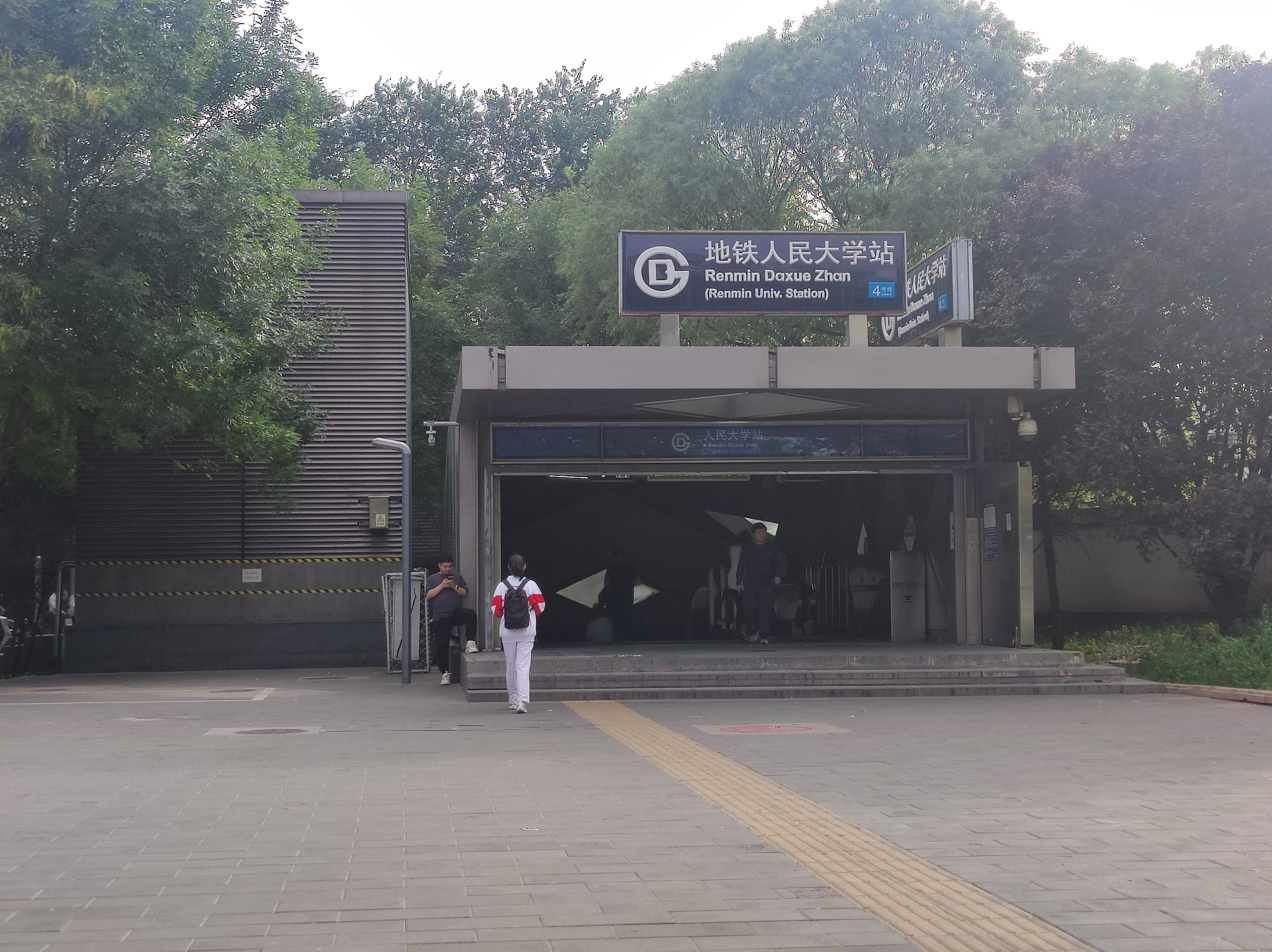
Exit C, Line 4

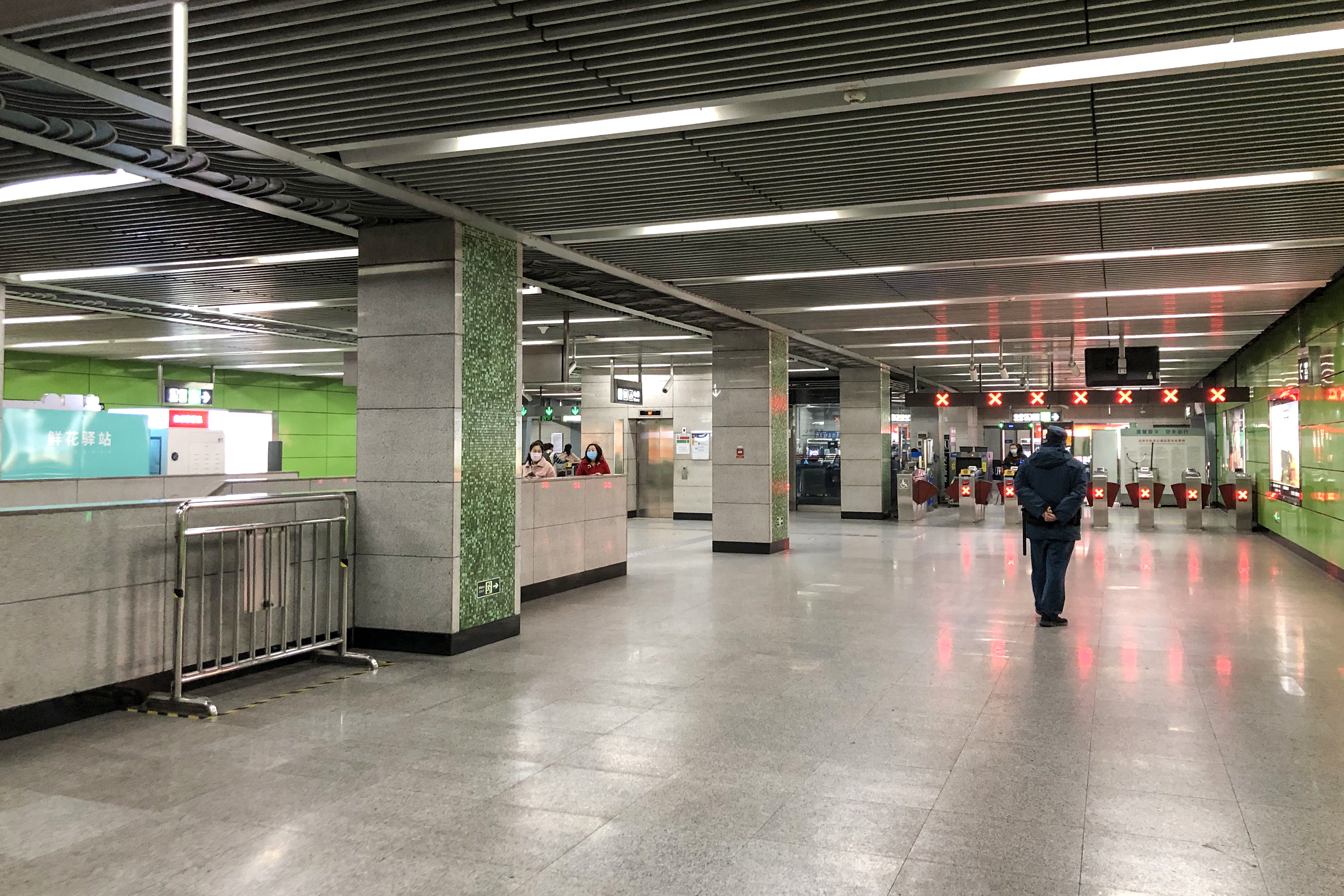
North concourse, Line 4

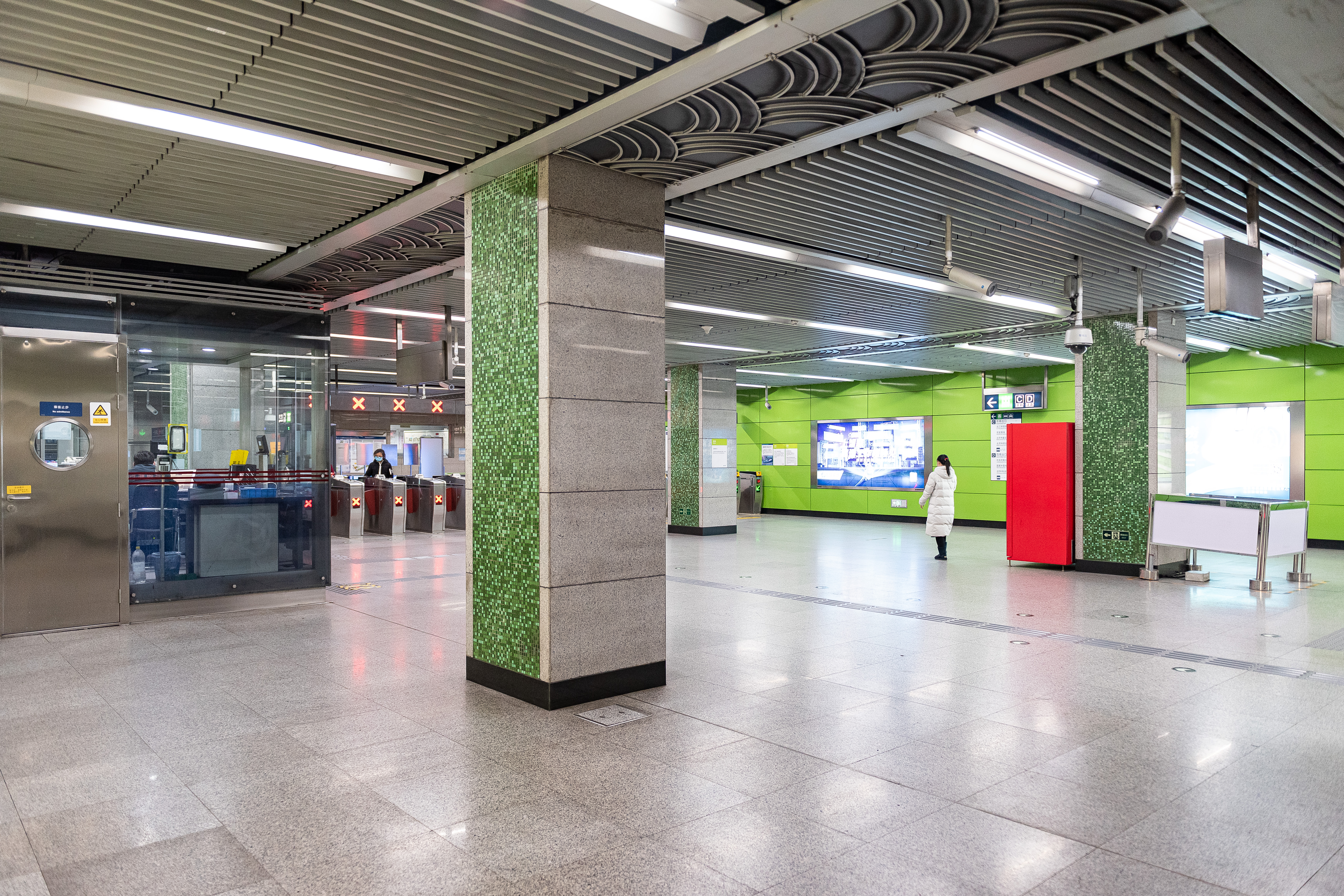
South concourse, Line 4

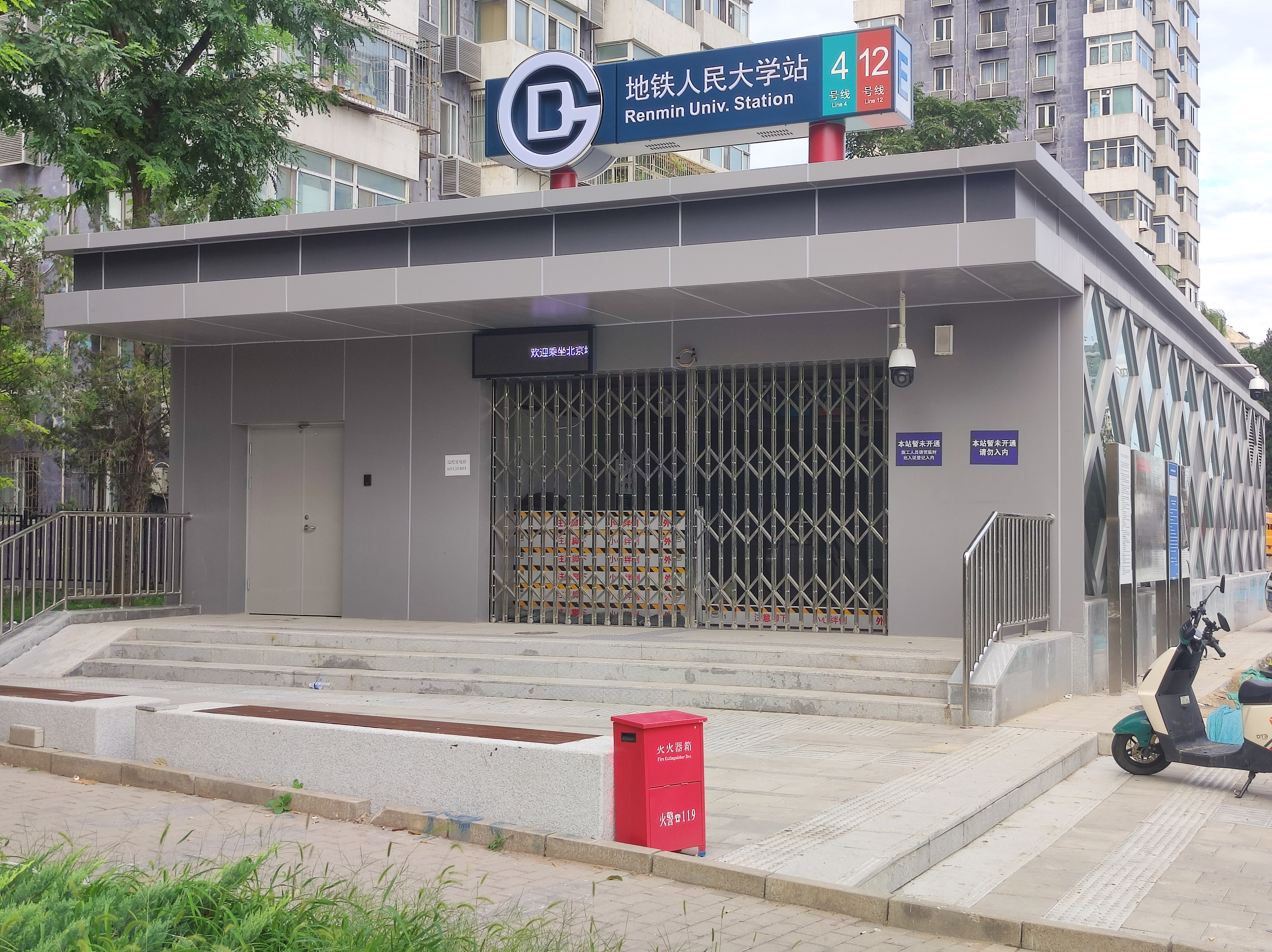
Exit E, Line 12

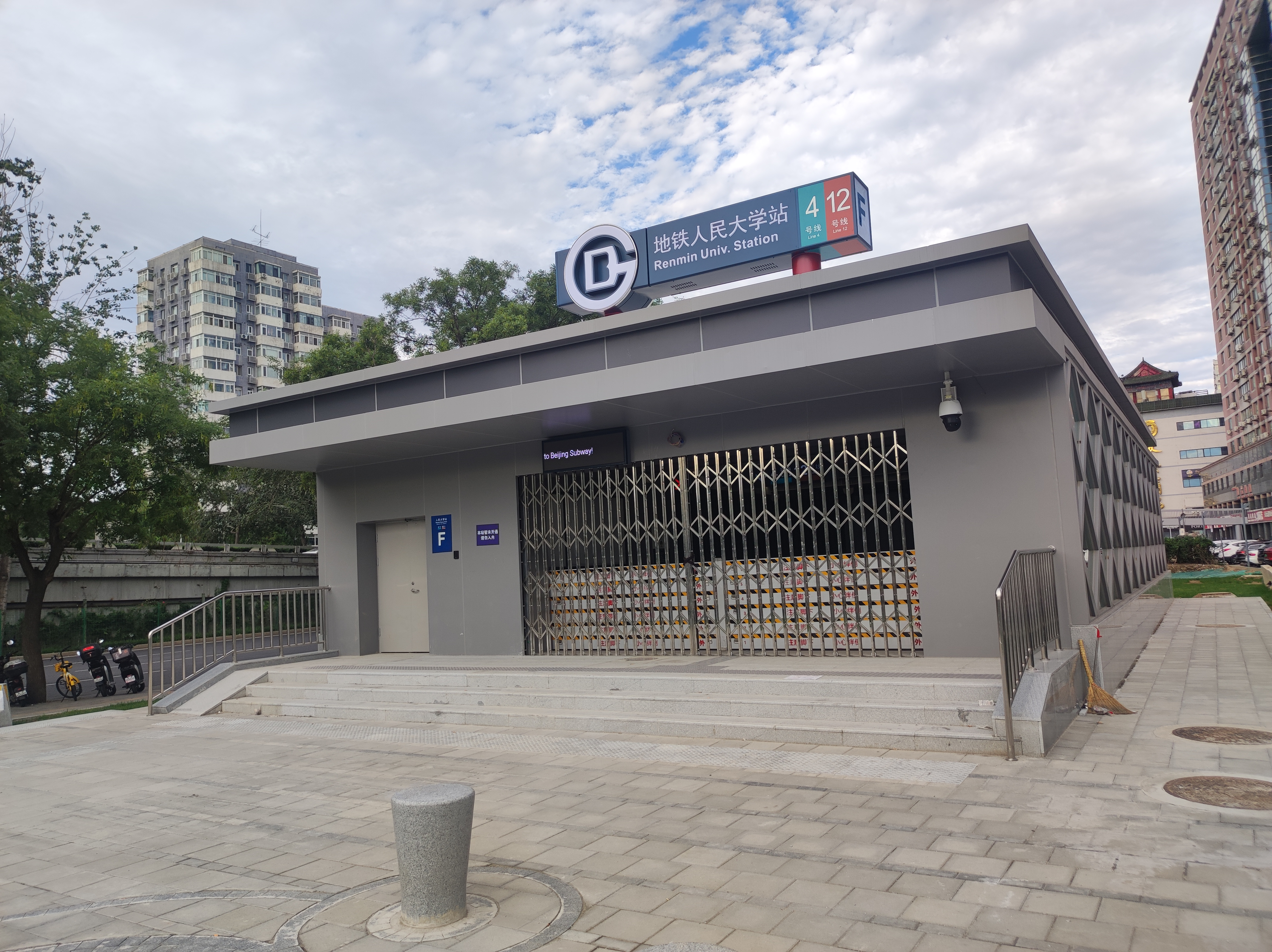
Exit F, Line 12
