= Xinjiangcun =

Uyghur enclave in Beijing, China

Xinjiangcun (Chinese: 新疆村; pinyin: Xīnjiāngcūn) or Xinjiang Village was an ethnic enclave of Uyghur people in the Ganjiakou and Weigongcun areas in Haidian District, Beijing. The Beijing government demolished the settlement in 1999. It is in proximity to a historical Uyghur enclave in Beijing.

== History ==
In the mid-1990s the community had over 40 restaurants due to a rise in popularity of ethnic cuisine. The Uyghurs of a higher socioeconomic position opened restaurants. Other Uyghurs sold barbecued mutton from stalls.

In 1999 the Beijing municipal government demolished the settlement. The government's explanation was that it would help reform Beijing into a city that would serve as a model and that it would help prevent illegal street vending. In 2001 Nimrod Baranovitch, author of "Inverted Exile: Uyghur Writers and Artists in Beijing and the Political Implications of Their Work," wrote that Uyghur workers in the remaining parts of the Xinjiangcun stated that they did not want to go back to Xinjiang because they feared retaliation for being involved in political activities.

Baranovitch wrote that by 2005 a new "Xinjiangcun" opened near the Beijing West railway station.

== See also ==
- Uyghur people in Beijing
- Zhejiangcun
