= Mi Na (painter) =

Chinese painter (born 1980)

Mi Na (Chinese: 米娜; pinyin: Mǐ Nà; born 1980) is a Chinese painter.

Mi was born in Anshun, Guizhou in 1980. She received her master's degree from Minzu University of China and joined the faculty of Beijing Union University.

Mi received the Gold Reward of the Qi Baishi Young Artists Price (齐白石艺术新人奖) in 2004.
