= Beigong Town =

Beigong Town 北宫镇
- Town
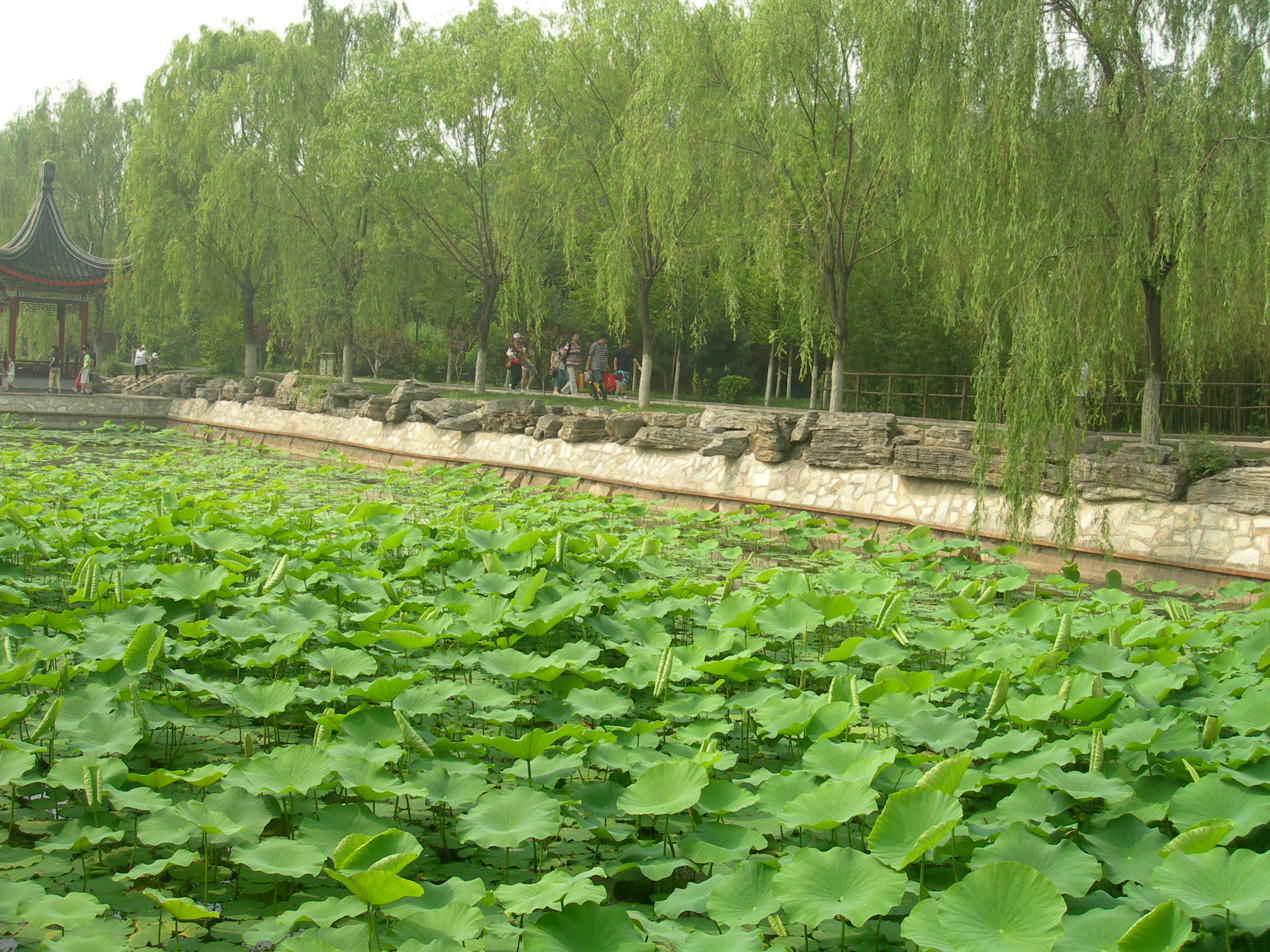
- Beigong National Forest Park

- Location within Beijing Location within China
- Coordinates: 39°50′24″N 116°12′12″E
- Country: China
- Municipality: Beijing
- District: Fengtai
- Village-level Divisions: 10 communities 6 villages

Area
  - Total: 51.49 km^{2} (19.88 sq mi)

Population (2020)
  - Total: 44,358
  - Density: 861.5/km^{2} (2,231/sq mi)
- Time zone: UTC+8 (China Standard)
- Postal code: 100165
- Area code: 010

Beigong Town (Chinese: 北宫镇; pinyin: Běigōng Zhèn) is a town within the Fengtai District of Beijing, China. It borders Yongding Township and Gucheng Subdistrict to the north, Lugu and Wanping Subdistricts to the east, Changyang Town to the south, Yungang Subdistrict and Wangzuo Town to the west, and contains Changxindian Subdistrict within it. Its population was 44,358 as of the year 2020.

The Town was named Beigong (Chinese: 北宫; pinyin: Běigōng) after the Beigong National Forest Park within the region.

== History ==
Timeline of Beigong Town
Years	Status	
1948	Part of Changxindian District of Beijing	
1949	Part of the 18th District	
1950	Part of the 15th District	
1953	Part of Sino-Czech Friendship Agricultural Cooperative	
1958	Formed Changxindian People's Commune	
1961	Split into two, with western portion became Wangzuo People's Commune	Split into two, with eastern portion became Changxindian Sino-Czech Friendship People's Commune
1983	Reformed into a rural bureau	Split into two, with eastern portion became Changxindian Sino-Czech Friendship People's Commune
1984	Merged into Changxindian Township	
2002	Reformed into Changxindian Town	
2021	Renamed Beigong Town	

== Administrative Division ==
Beigong Town is divided into 16 subdivisions, with 10 communities and 6 villages:

Administrative Division Code	Community Names	Name Transliteration	Type
110106100001	得秀	Dexiu	Community
110106100002	槐树岭	Huaishuling	Community
110106100003	二七车辆厂	Erqi Cheliangchang	Community
110106100004	张郭庄	Zhangguozhuang	Community
110106100005	芦井	Lujing	Community
110106100006	装甲兵工程学院	Zhuangjiabing Gongcheng Xueyuan	Community
110106100007	杜家坎	Dujiakan	Community
110106100008	装技所	Zhuangjisuo	Community
110106100009	红山郡	Hongshanjun	Community
110106100010	大灰厂	Dahuichang	Community
110106100200	张郭庄	Zhangguozhuang	Village
110106100201	东河沿	Dongheyan	Village
110106100202	辛庄	Xinzhuang	Village
110106100203	大灰厂	Dahuichang	Village
110106100204	李家峪	Lijiayu	Village
110106100205	太子峪	Taiziyu	Village

== Transport ==
- Beigong station (under construction, 2027)

== See also ==
- List of township-level divisions of Beijing
