= Zhejiangcun =

Migrant worker community in Beijing, China

Zhejiang (Chinese: 浙江村; pinyin: Zhèjiāngcūn "Zhejiang Village") was a community of migrant workers around the Nanyuan-Dahongmen area, within Fengtai District, Beijing. These workers originated from Zhejiang, with most of them from Wenzhou.

== History ==
Liu Xiaoli and Liang Wei, authors of "Zhejiangcun: social and spatial implications of informal urbanization on the periphery of Beijing," wrote that the Lu Brothers, who originated from Qingjiang district, Yueqing county, Zhejiang, were "said" to be the founders of Zhejiangcun. In 1982 they had stopped in Beijing on a journey from Inner Mongolia back to their hometowns. They set up a stand to sell overstocked goods in proximity to the Qianmen underground passageway and found a high volume of sales. Instead of returning to Wenzhou they rented a room in a peasant's house and opened a business there. A governmental open door policy to commerce and industry was established in Beijing in 1983, increasing the influx of businesspeople. A lot of immigrants came from Wenzhou because that city had a strong tradition of business.

In November 1995 the authorities demolished large segments of the Zhejiangcun settlement.

== Cityscape ==
The historical community, around the Nanyuan-Dahongmen area, covered 24 administrative villages. The central portion of the area included the municipal villages of Dahongmen, Dongluoyuan, Ganyuan, Shicun, and Shiliuzhuang. Its borders were Muxiyuan to the north, Majiapo to the south, Chengshou Temple to the east, and Dahongmen to the south. The primary commercial street of Zhejiangcun was Dahongmen Street, which is 20 metres (66 ft) wide. The centermost part of Zhejiangcun consisted of the municipal sub-villages of Shicun: Dengcun, Houcun, and Macun.

Pre-November 1995 Dahongmen Street included small retail shops selling clothing and wholesale markets. A 150-square-metre (1,600 sq ft) open air market was located on a 100 metres (330 ft) street in Macun. This market was demolished in November 1995.

== Demographics ==
The pre-November 1995 estimates stated that 100,000 migrant workers lived in the community. 80% originated from Wenzhou, Zhejiang.

== See also ==
- Xinjiangcun

== Text for multiple references ==
- Liu, Xiaoli and Liang Wei, 1997. "Zhejiangcun: social and spatial implications of informal urbanization on the periphery of Beijing." Cities 14 (2), 95–108.
