= Dalian Minzu University =

University in Dalian, Liaoning Province, China

Coordinates: 39°02′47″N 121°46′17″E

- 大连民族大学
- Type: National university
- Established: 1997; 28 years ago
- Parent institution: National Ethnic Affairs Commission
- President: Liu Yubin
- Location: Dalian, Liaoning, China
- Campus: Suburban
- Website: www.dlnu.edu.cn

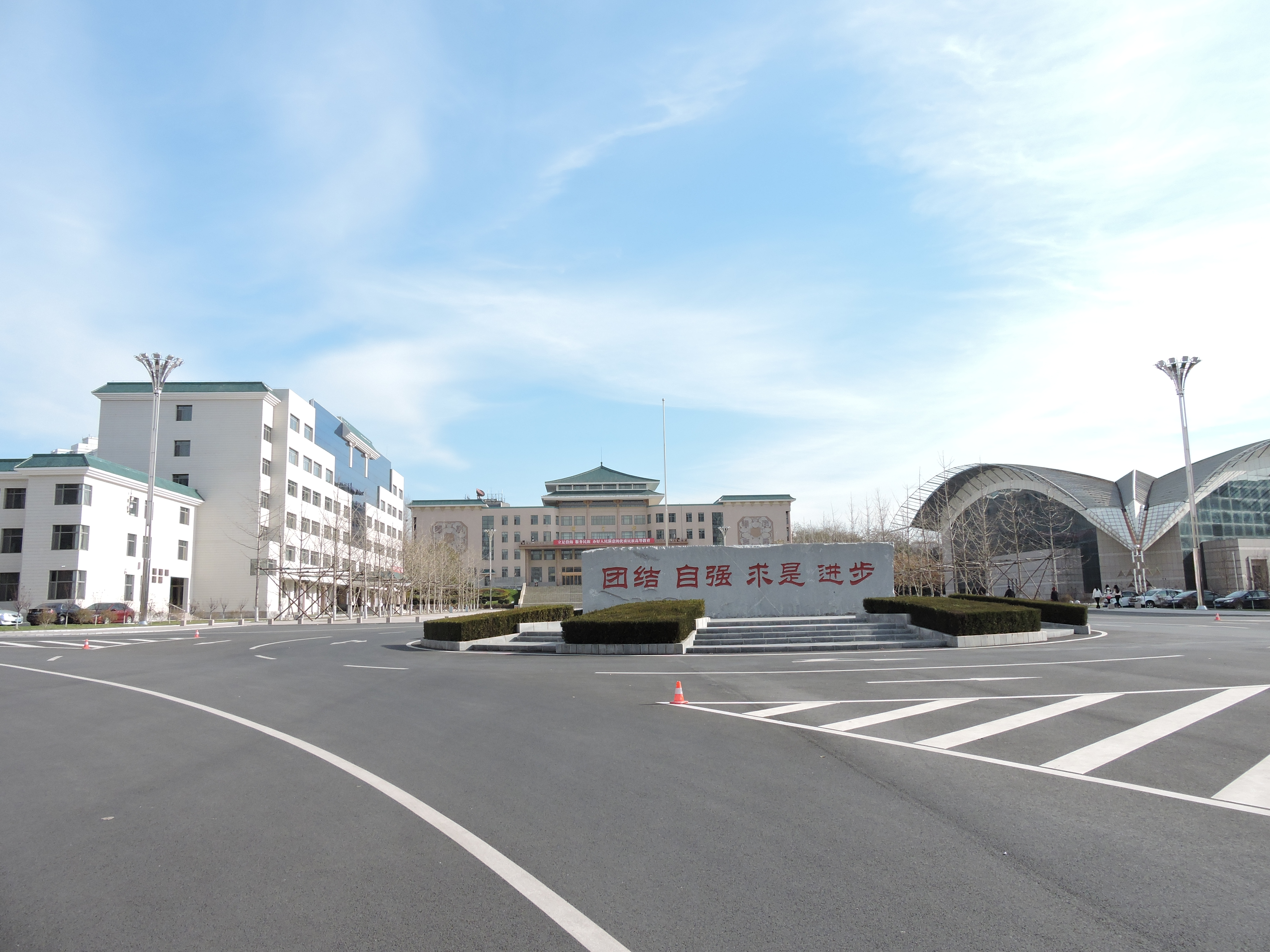
Dalian Nationalities University

Dalian Minzu University (大连民族大学) is located in Dalian, Liaoning, China. It is affiliated with the National Ethnic Affairs Commission.

== History ==
Dalian Minzu University (former name Dalian Nationalities University) was founded in 1997. As the only Nationalities University focusing on technology and applied science, it has grown very rapidly ever since. It is now one of the leading universities in Northeast China.

Students of DMU have won numerous awards in various scientific and technological competitions, including winning Mathematical Contest in Modeling (MCM) 2005, representing China to compete in Robocup 2007, Winning Microsoft Imagine Cup in China 2008 and Second prize internationally.

== Departments ==
Dalian Minzu University has a good reputation in both engineering and science programs. The university also offers programs in business, economics, arts, and management. It has 40 bachelor's degree programs and 14 colleges, including:

- College of Economics and Management
- College of Life Science
- College of Computer Science & Engineering
- College of Electromechanical and Information Engineering
- College of Architecture and Civil Engineering
- College of Liberal Arts & Law
- College of Mathematics and Physics
- College of Foreign Languages and Cultures
- College of Design

== Campus ==
The campus is large and has comprehensive modern teaching and research equipment. Fifteen state and provincial key laboratories have been established one after another throughout the years.

== See also ==
- Minzu University of China
