= Demographics of Beijing =

Beijing Population census

Historical population
| Year | Pop. | ±% p.a. |
|---|---|---|
| 57 | 280,600 | — |
| 589 | 458,000 | +0.09% |
| 938 | 100,000 | −0.44% |
| 1113 | 583,000 | +1.01% |
| 1125 | 340,000 | −4.39% |
| 1207 | 1,600,000 | +1.91% |
| 1216 | 285,000 | −17.44% |
| 1270 | 1,053,000 | +2.45% |
| 1327 | 3,032,000 | +1.87% |
| 1369 | 208,000 | −6.18% |
| 1448 | 3,150,000 | +3.50% |
| 1644 | 698,000 | −0.77% |
| 1647 | 1,839,000 | +38.12% |
| 1781 | 2,956,242 | +0.35% |
| 1881 | 3,226,111 | +0.09% |
| 1910 | 2,485,442 | −0.90% |
| 1917 | 3,711,566 | +5.90% |
| 1935 | 4,595,000 | +1.19% |
| 1949 | 2,030,000 | −5.67% |
| 1953 | 2,768,149 | +8.06% |
| 1964 | 7,568,495 | +9.57% |
| 1982 | 9,230,687 | +1.11% |
| 1990 | 10,819,407 | +2.00% |
| 2000 | 13,569,194 | +2.29% |
| 2010 | 19,612,368 | +3.75% |
| 2013 | 21,150,000 | +2.55% |
Population size may be affected by changes on administrative divisions.

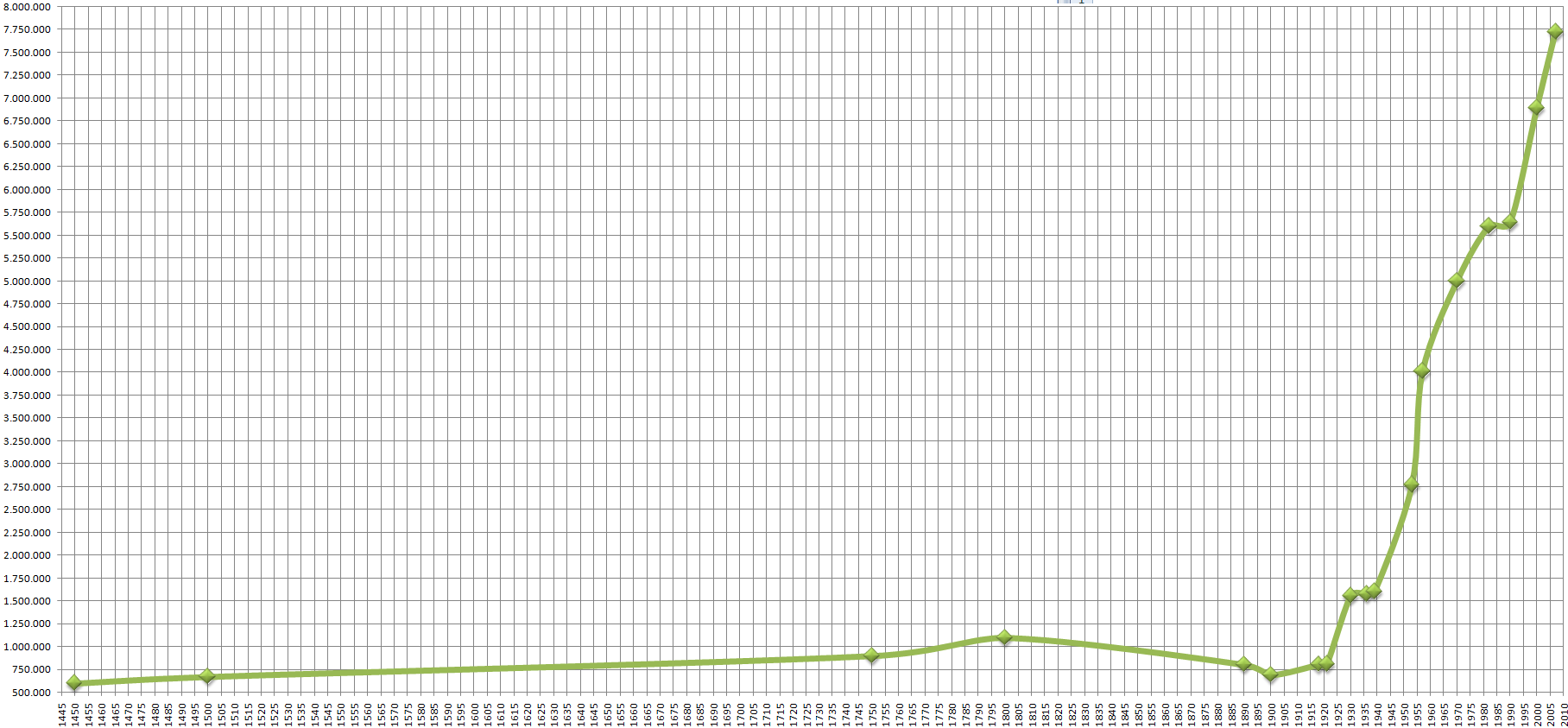
Beijing's population (1445–2010)

The registered population of Beijing Municipality consists of people holding either Beijing permanent residence hukou permits or temporary residence permits. The 2010 census revealed that the official total population in Beijing was 19,612,368, representing a 44% increase over the last decade. In 2006, the population of the urban core was 13.33 million, 84.3 percent of the total municipal population, which officially stood at 15.81 million. Urban sprawl continues at a rapid pace.

After Chongqing and Shanghai, Beijing is the third largest of the four directly controlled municipalities of the People's Republic of China. In the PRC, a directly controlled municipality (直辖市 in pinyin: zhíxiáshì) is a city with status equal to a province. Even though Chongqing is the most populous municipality, it has a larger land area than either Beijing or Shanghai and includes many rural areas; Brittany Hite of The Wall Street Journal stated that Chongqing "is more akin to a small province than a city."

According to the statistical yearbook issued in 2005 by the National Bureau of Statistics of China, out of a total population in 2004 of 14.213 million in Beijing, 1.415 million (9.96%) were 0–14 years old, 11.217 million (78.92%) were 15–64 and 1.581 million (11.12%) 65 and over.

As of 2014, the population of Beijing almost equalled that of Australia.

== Ethnic groups ==
Most of Beijing's residents belong to the Han Chinese majority. Ethnic minorities include the Manchu, Hui, and Mongol. According to the 2010 National Census there were 18,811,000 Han Chinese in Beijing along with 336,000 Manchus, 249,000 Hui, 77,000 Mongols, 37,000 Koreans and 24,000 Tujia forming the largest minorities. There is one ethnic minority area in Miyun County, the Tanying Manchu and Mongolian Area. Tibetan-language high school exists for youth of Tibetan ancestry, nearly all of whom have come to Beijing from Tibet expressly for their studies. A sizable international community resides in Beijing, many attracted by the highly growing foreign business and trade sector, others by the traditional and modern culture of the city. Many of these foreigners live in the areas around the Beijing CBD, Sanlitun, and Wudaokou. In recent years, there has also been an influx of South Koreans, an estimated 200,000 in 2009, predominantly for business and study. Many of them live in the Wangjing and Wudaokou areas.

Ethnic groups in Beijing, 2000 census (excluding members of the People's Liberation Army in active service)
| Ethnicity | Population | Percentage |
|---|---|---|
| Han | 12,983,696 | 95.69% |
| Manchu | 250,286 | 1.84% |
| Hui | 235,837 | 1.74% |
| Mongols | 37,464 | 0.28% |
| Koreans | 20,369 | 0.15% |
| Tujia | 8372 | 0.062% |
| Zhuang | 7322 | 0.054% |
| Miao | 5291 | 0.039% |
| Uyghur | 3129 | 0.023% |
| Tibetan | 2920 | 0.022% |

Nimrod Baranovitch, author of "Inverted Exile: Uyghur Writers and Artists in Beijing and the Political Implications of Their Work," stated that the actual number of Uyghur in Beijing is greater than the official count that because official statistics do not "include the floating population". Baranovitch stated that he had informants tell him that there were 10,000 Uyghurs in 2001 and 13,000 Uyghurs in 2005 but he was unable to verify the figures.

== Rural migrants ==
Rural migrant workers come to Beijing from all over China. Many move to settlements depending on their origins. For instance by 1997 many Zhejiang province migrant workers moved to Zhejiangcun in Fengtai District and many Henan province migrant workers moved to Henancun (C: 河南村, P: Hénán-cūn) in Haidian District. As of 1993, of the rural migrants in Beijing, 20.2% originated in Hebei, 17.0% originated in Henan, 14.2% originated in Anhui, 11.3% originated in Jiangsu, 10.6% originated in Zhejiang, 7.8% originated in Sichuan, 2.1% originated in Fujian and Guangdong provinces, and 16.7% originated in other provinces.

Due to China's rapid economic growth, 8.2 million people migrated from rural China to Beijing (2015), but unable to secure official residency status, many rural immigrants settled in dilapidated inner city buildings and increasingly turned to constructing their own housing illegally. Following a fire in a building housing migrant workers on 18 November 2017, Beijing city officials commenced a 40-day campaign to demolish buildings deemed unsafe. As a result, many migrant workers were displaced, with some of them forced to return to their home provinces. The campaign drew considerable criticism. For example, a petitioned signed by more than 100 Beijing intellectuals denounced the campaign as a "violation of human rights." Remarkably, China's primary state broadcaster, CCTV, also published commentary criticizing the government's actions. Amid the public mounting public criticism, Beijing's party chief Cai Qi visited migrant workers and called on employers to be more cognizant of migrant workers's wellbeing.

== See also ==
- Demographics of China
- Migration in China
