= Central Academy for Ethnic Cadres =

Chinese Communist Party body

Central Institute for Ethnic Cadres
- 中央民族干部学院
- Type: Public, government-affiliated training institution
- Established: 1983
- Parent institution: National Ethnic Affairs Commission
- Location: Beijing, China
- Website: www.mzgbxy.org.cn

The Central Institute of Ethnic Cadres (CIEC; Chinese: 中央民族干部学院; pinyin: Zhōngyāng mínzú gànbù xuéyuàn) is an educational institution in Beijing, China. The institute was founded in 1983 as the Central Institute of Ethnic Minority Administrative Cadres (Chinese: 中央少数民族管理干部学院). It was renamed to the Central Academy for Ethnic Cadre in 2003 after the opening of a new campus. Its purpose is to teach ethnic minority cadres of the Chinese Communist Party who are in the middle and upper ranks. By 2013, it had taught over 35,000 students since its 2003 rename.

== See also ==
- Cadre system of the Chinese Communist Party
- Ethnic minorities in China
