= South–Central Minzu University =

National public university in Wuhan, Hubei, China

- 中南民族大学
- Former names: South–Central College for Nationalities; South–Central Minzu University for Nationalities
- Motto: 笃信好学 自然宽和
- Type: National university
- Established: 1951; 75 years ago
- Location: Wuhan, Hubei, China
- Campus: 100 ha
- Website: www.scuec.edu.cn

South–Central Minzu University (SCMU; 中南民族大学) is a national public university in Wuhan, Hubei, China. It is affiliated with the National Ethnic Affairs Commission of China.

The university is a comprehensive university founded in 1951 as South–Central Minzu College for Nationalities (中南民族学院). In March 2002, the school was renamed South–Central Minzu University. It is one of the six national higher education institutes for ethnic groups in China.

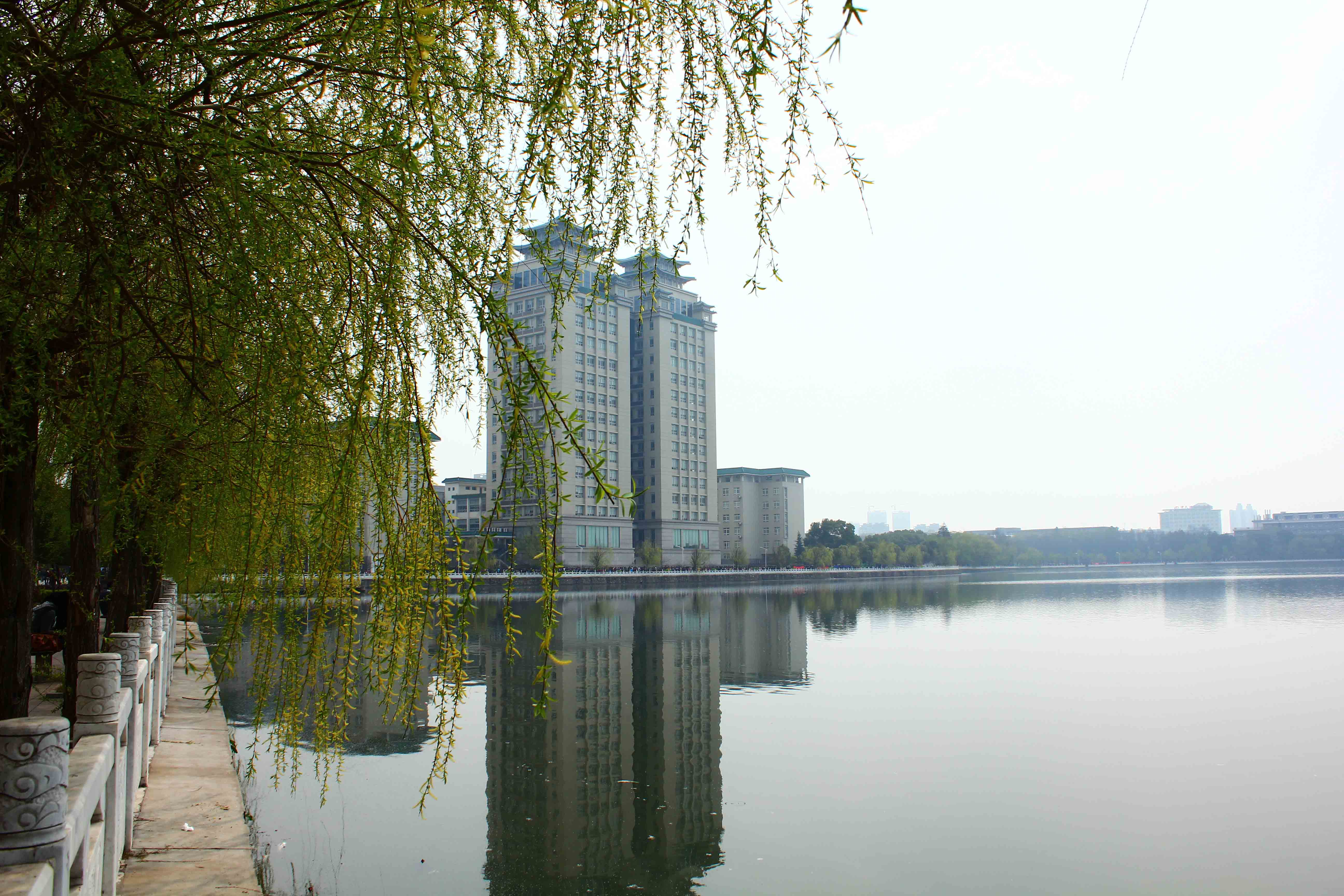
The university library
