= Northwest Minzu University =

University in Lanzhou, China

- 西北民族大学
- Established: August 1950; 76 years ago
- Parent institution: State Ethnic Affairs Commission
- President: Wang Yanbin (王彦斌)
- Faculty: 1,169 (main campus)
- Students: 29,000 (5,000 on main campus)
- Location: Lanzhou, Gansu, People's Republic of China
- Website: (in Chinese), (in English)

Northwest Minzu University (Chinese: 西北民族大学; pinyin: Xīběi Mínzú Dàxué), formerly known as Northwest University for Nationalities, is the first minority institution of higher learning founded in China after the establishment of the People's Republic of China, directly under the State Ethnic Affairs Commission of the United Front Work Department. The university is in Lanzhou, Gansu Province, and covers a land area of 474 acres (1.92 km^{2}). It has two campuses: Northwest Xincun and Yuzhong.

== History ==
The university's precedent was the third campus of Northwest People's Revolutionary University in Lanzhou. From February 1950, the school was planned on the basis of that campus. In August 1950, Northwest Nationalities College was founded, and a senior CPC leader, Wang Feng, became the first president. In April 2003, approved by the Ministry of Education and State Ethnic Affairs Commission, the school adopted the current name, Northwest University for Nationalities.

In June 2016, the university officially changed its English name to Northwest Minzu University. The Chinese name remained the same (Chinese: 西北民族大学; pinyin: Xīběi Mínzú Dàxué).

== Publications ==
The university created the first internet website in Tibetan in the world.

The following journals are edited and published by the university:

- Northwest Minorities Research (kernel journal at national level)
- Journal of Northwest University for Nationalities (Philosophy and Social Science edition), (kernel journal at national level)
- Journal of Northwest University for Nationalities (Tibetan Edition)
- Journal of Northwest University for Nationalities (Mongolian edition)
- Journal of Northwest University for Nationalities (Natural Science edition)
- Northwest University for Nationalities Tabloid
