= Weigongcun, Beijing =

Area of Haidian, Beijing, China

Coordinates: 30°27′N 97°38′E

Weigongcun (Chinese: 魏公村; pinyin: Wèigōngcūn) area is an area of Haidian District, Beijing. It houses Minzu University of China, Beijing Foreign Studies University, and Beijing Institute of Technology. It has restaurants from a wide variety of ethnic minorities. According to Minzu University anthropology professor Zhuang Kongshao, the area has been the Uyghur ghetto in Beijing since the Yuan Dynasty, when it was known as Weiwucun ("Uyghur village", presumably Chinese: 维吾村; pinyin: Wéiwúcūn) and was a local shopping area. The Qing scholar Qiao Songnian claimed in 1834 that the Uyghurs had been brought there by Yuan Taizu. The name Weigongcun is first recorded only in 1915, and removes any reference to Uyghurs. Others attribute the ethnic variety solely to the presence of CUN. Most of the Uyghur district was razed around 2001.

== Communities ==
- Xinjiangcun
