= Yungang Subdistrict =

Yungang Subdistrict 云岗街道
- Subdistrict
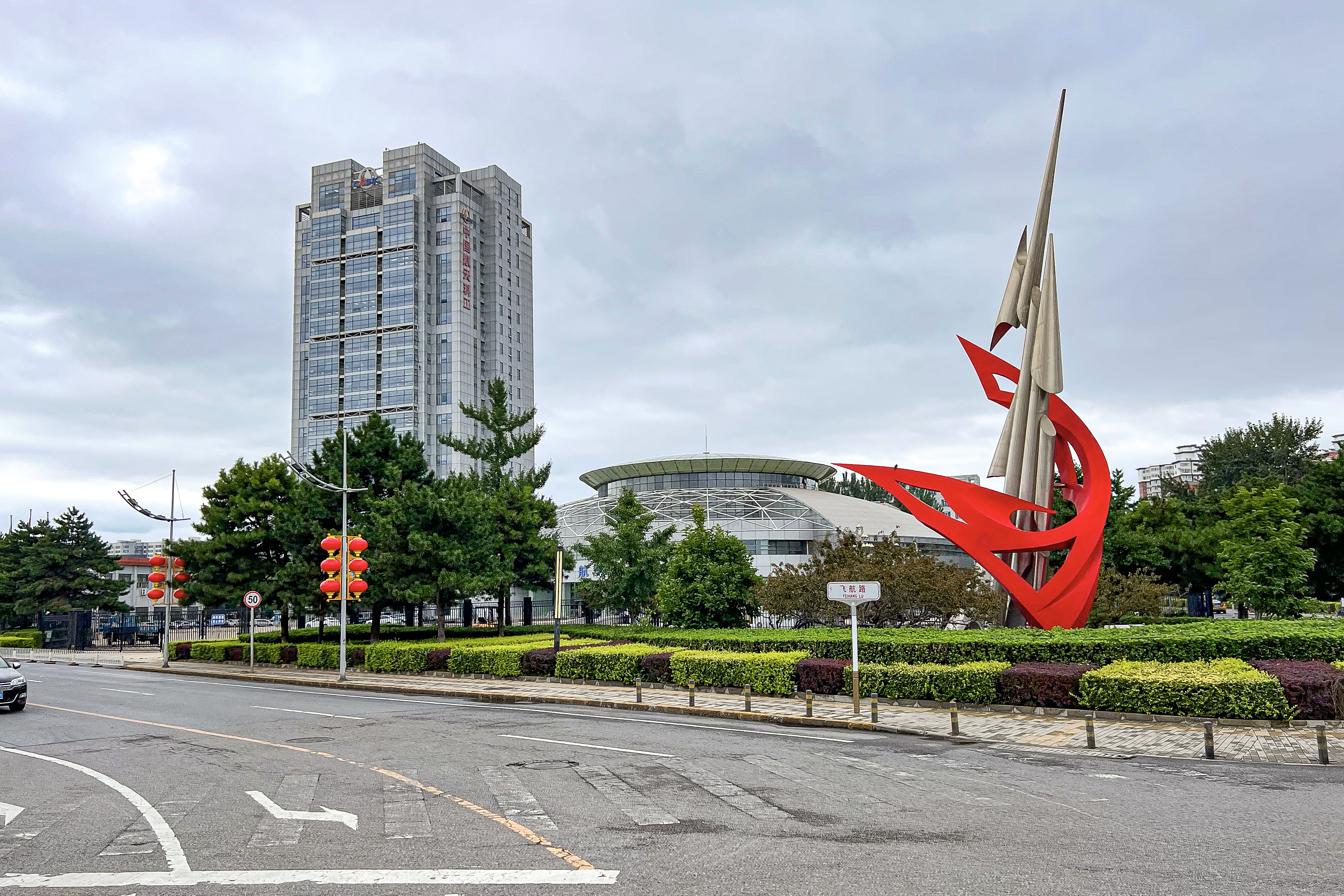
- Yungang Aerospace Exhibition Center, 2022

- Location within Beijing Location within China
- Coordinates: 39°48′34″N 116°09′27″E
- Country: China
- Municipality: Beijing
- District: Fengtai
- Village-level Divisions: 11 communities 1 village

Area
  - Total: 7.25 km^{2} (2.80 sq mi)

Population (2020)
  - Total: 34,537
  - Density: 4,760/km^{2} (12,300/sq mi)
- Time zone: UTC+8 (China Standard)
- Postal code: 100074
- Area code: 010

Yungang Subdistrict (Chinese: 云岗街道; pinyin: Yúngǎng Jiēdào) is one of the fourteen subdistricts of Fengtai District, Beijing, China. It is located on the southwest of Fengtai, and borders Changxindian Town to the northeast, as well as Wangzuo Town to the southwest. It had a population of 34,537 in 2020.

== History ==
Timeline of Yungang Subdistrict
Year	Status
1949	Part of Liangxiang County
1958	Transferred under Fengtai District
1963	The 5th Academy of The 7th Machine Industry Department was relocated here
1969	Established As Yungang Subdistrict

== Administrative Division ==
At the end of 2021, there were a total of 12 subdivisions within the subdistrict, with 11 communities and 1 village:

Administrative Division Code	Community Names	Name Transliteration	Type
110106012001	南区第一	Nanqu Diyi	Community
110106012002	南区第二	Nanqu Di'er	Community
110106012003	云西路	Yunxilu	Community
110106012004	田城	Tiancheng	Community
110106012005	北区	Beiqu	Community
110106012006	北里	Beili	Community
110106012007	翠园	Cuiyuan	Community
110106012008	镇岗南里	Zhengang Nanli	Community
110106012010	张家坟	Zhangjiafen	Community
110106012011	朱家坟西山坡	Zhujiafen Xishanpo	Community
110106012012	珠光嘉园	Zhuguang Jiayuan	Community
110106012013	珠光逸景	Zhuguang Yijing	Community
110106012200	张家坟	Zhangjiafen	Village

== See also ==
- List of township-level divisions of Beijing
