= Wulidian Subdistrict =

Subdistrict located in Beijing, China

Wulidian Subdistrict 五里店街道
- Subdistrict
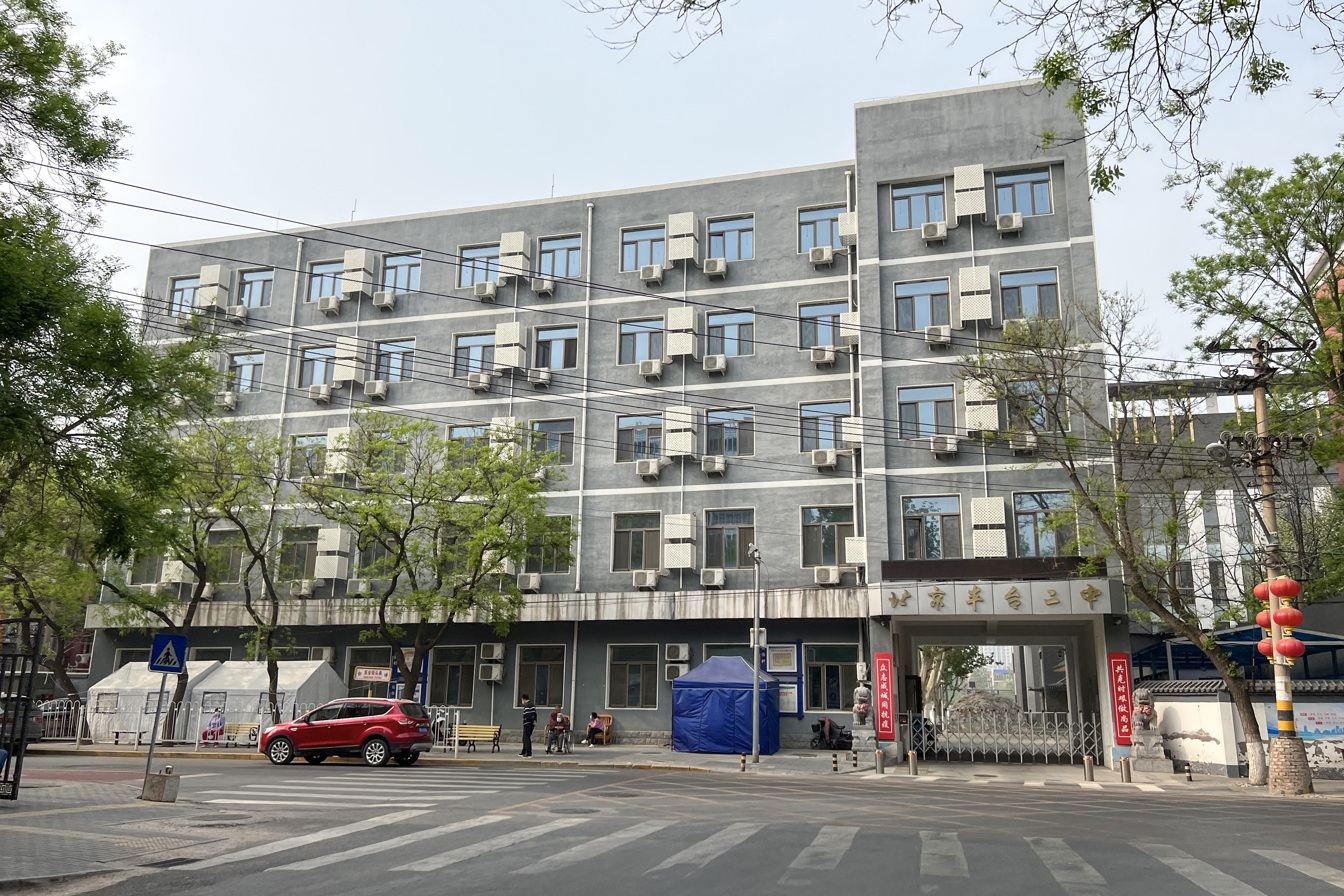
- Fengtai No.2 Middle School within Wulidian, 2020

- Location within Beijing Location within China
- Coordinates: 39°51′25″N 116°15′01″E
- Country: China
- Municipality: Beijing
- District: Fengtai
- Village-level Divisions: 16 communities
- Time zone: UTC+8 (China Standard)
- Postal code: 100166
- Area code: 010

Wulidian Subdistrict (Chinese: 五里店街道; pinyin: Wǔlǐdiàn Jiēdào) is a subdistrict located on the north side of Fengtai District, Beijing, China. It shares border with Lugouqiao Subdistrict to the northwest, Liuliqiao and Fengtai Subdistricts to the east, Kandan and Wanping Subdistricts to the south.

The subdistrict was created from parts of Fengtai Subdistrict, Lugouqiao Subdistrict and Liuliqiao Subdistrict in 2021.

== Administrative divisions ==
In 2021, the subdistrict had direct jurisdiction over 16 communities:

Administrative Division Code	Community Names	Name Transliterations
110106024001	程庄路16号院	Chengzhuanglu 16 Haoyuan
110106024002	东安街头条十九号院	Dong'anjie Toutiao Shijiu Haoyuan
110106024003	六十三号院	Liushisan Haoyuan
110106024004	北大地十六号院	Beidadi Shiliu Haoyuan
110106024005	北大地西区	Beidadi Xiqu
110106024006	东安街头条	Dong'anjie Toutiao
110106024007	东安街	Dong'anjie
110106024008	彩虹南	Caihong Nan
110106024009	彩虹北	Caihong Bei
110106024010	五里店第一	Wulidian Diyi
110106024011	五里店第二	Wulidian Di'er
110106024012	丰西路	Fengxilu
110106024013	油泵厂	Youbengchang
110106024014	大井	Dajing
110106024015	丰体时代花园	Fengti Shidai Huayuan
110106024016	和风四季	Hefeng Siji

== Gallery ==
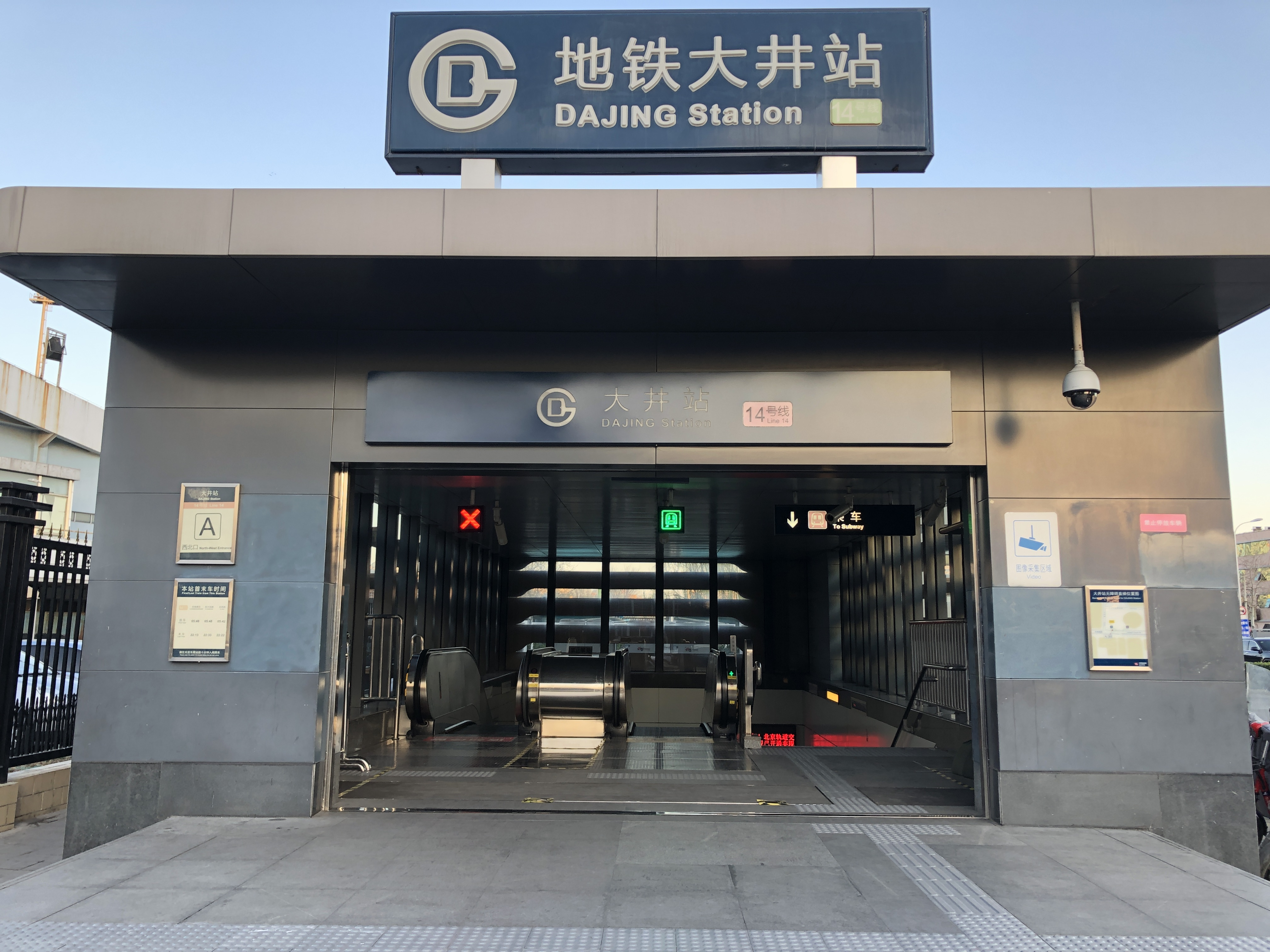
Dajing Station, 2019

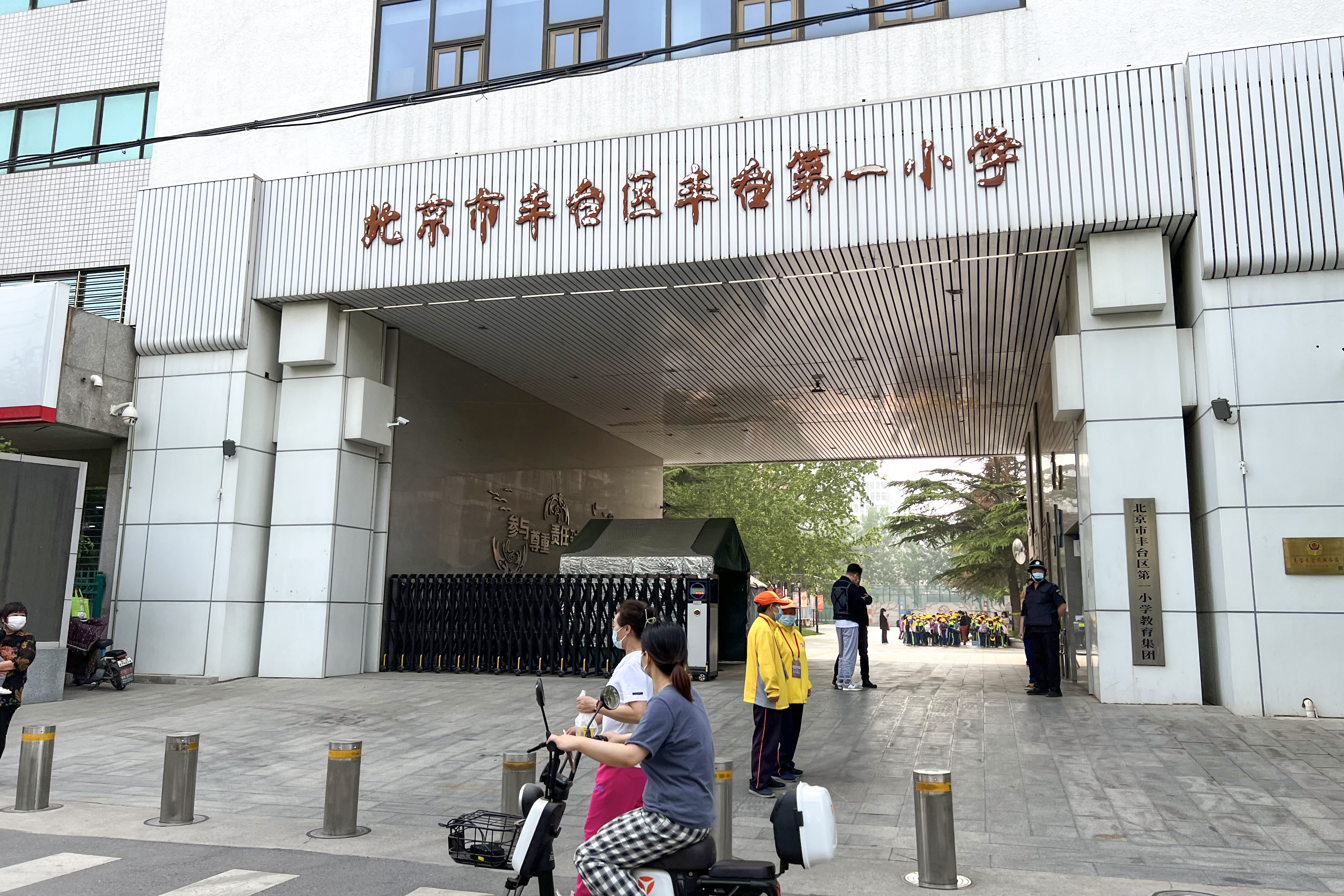
Fengtai No. 1 Primary School, 2022

== See also ==
- List of township-level divisions of Beijing
