= Shiliuzhuang Subdistrict =

Shiliuzhuang Subdistrict 石榴庄街道
- Subdistrict
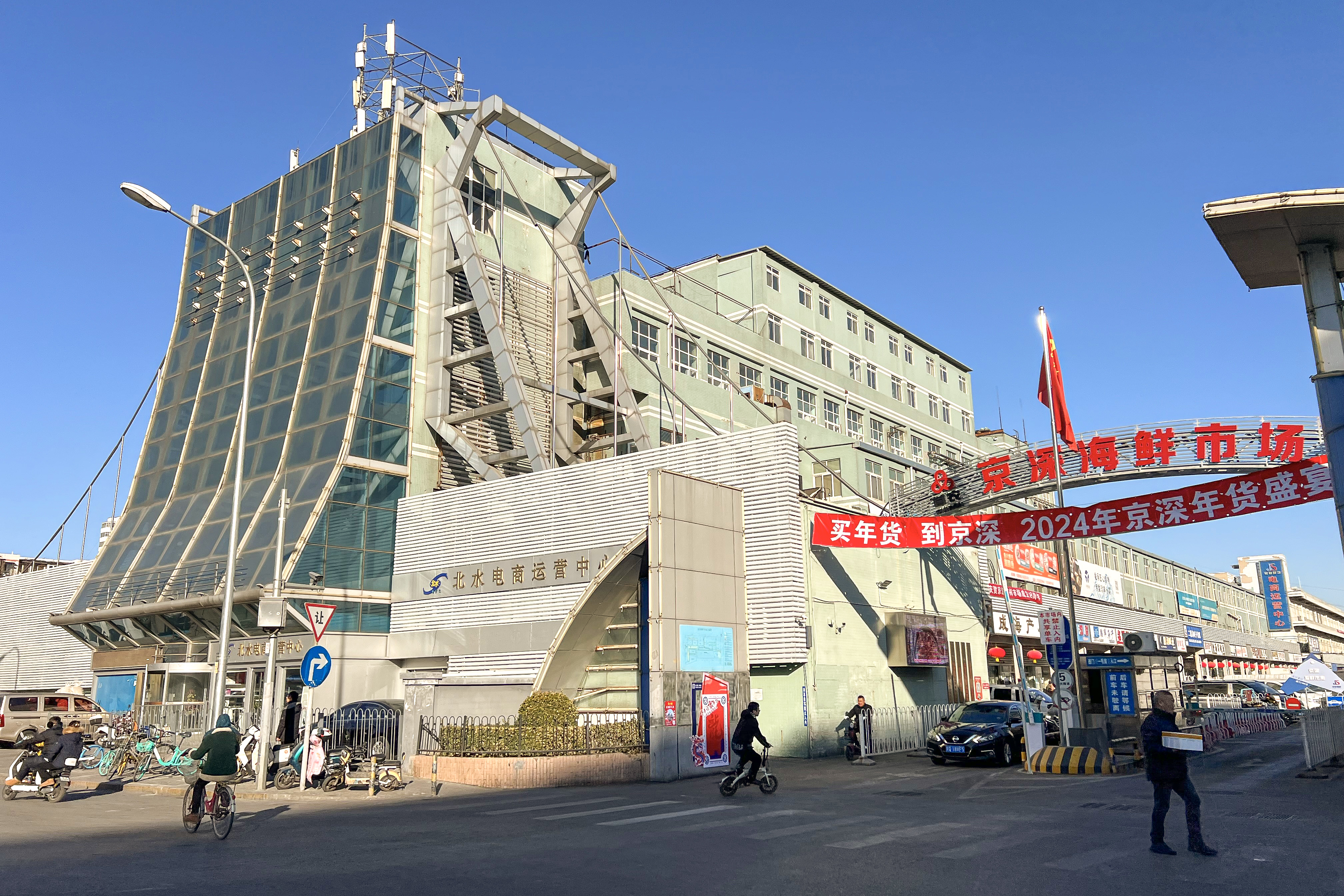
- Jingshen Seafood Market within the subdistrict, 2024

- Location within Beijing Location within China
- Coordinates: 39°50′16″N 116°24′49″E
- Country: China
- Municipality: Beijing
- District: Fengtai
- Village-level Divisions: 15 communities
- Time zone: UTC+8 (China Standard)
- Postal code: 100079
- Area code: 010

Shiliuzhuang Subdistrict (Chinese: 石榴庄街道; pinyin: Shíliúzhuāng Jiēdào) is a subdistrict on eastern Fengtai District, Beijing, China. It shares border with Chengshousi Subdistrict and Shibalidian Township to the east, Donggaodi Subdistrict to the south, and Dahongmen Subdistrict to the west and north.

The subdistrict was created in 2021 from portions of Dongtiejiangying and Dahongmen Subdistricts. It took its name Shiliuzhuang (Chinese: 石榴庄; lit. 'Pomegranate Villa') from its historical location as an imperial pomegranate orchard.

== History ==
Timeline of Shiliuzhuang Subdistrict
Year	Status	Within
1949 - 1950		15th District
1950 - 1952		11th District
1952 - 1953		Nanyuan District
1953 - 1956	Shiliuzhuang Township	Nanyuan District
1956 - 1958	Part of Dahongmen Township	Nanyuan District
1958 - 1984	Part of Dahongmen Subdistrict	Fengtai District
1984 - 1987	Shiliuzhuang Township	Fengtai District
1987 - 2021	Part of Nanyuan Township	Fengtai District
2021–present	Shiliuzhuang Subdistrict	Fengtai District

== Administrative Division ==
As of 2023, Shiliuzhuang Subdistrict consists of 15 communities:

Administrative Division Code	Community Names	Name Transliteration
110106021001	石榴园北里第一	Shiliuyuan Beili Diyi
110106021002	石榴园北里第二	Shiliuyuan Beili Di'er
110106021003	石榴园南里第一	Shiliuyuan Nanli Diyi
110106021004	石榴园南里第二	Shiliuyuan Nanli Di'er
110106021005	石榴庄东街	Shiliuzhuang Dongjie
110106021006	彩虹城	Caihongcheng
110106021007	世华水岸	Shihua Shui'an
110106021008	石榴庄东街第二	Shiliuzhuang Dongjie Di'er
110106021009	顶秀欣园	Xiangxiu Xinyuan
110106021010	政馨家园	Zhengxin Jiayuan
110106021011	红狮家园	Hongshi Jiayuan
110106021012	宋家庄	Songjiazhuang
110106021013	鑫兆雅园	Xinzhao Yayuan
110106021014	双石一	Shuangshiyi
110106021015	双石二	Shuangshi'er

== Gallery ==
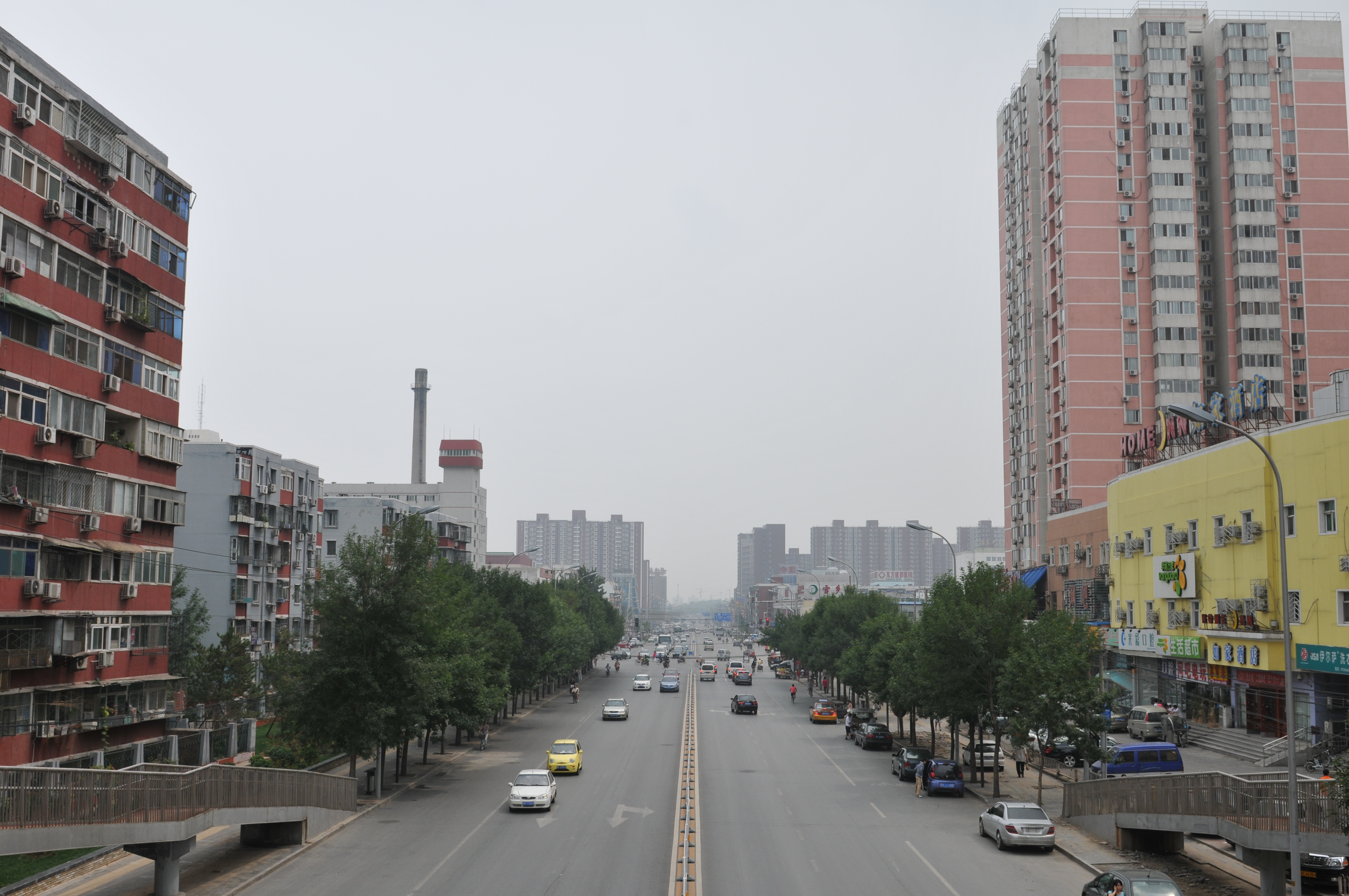
Guangcai Road, which formed the western border of Shiliuzhuang, 2011

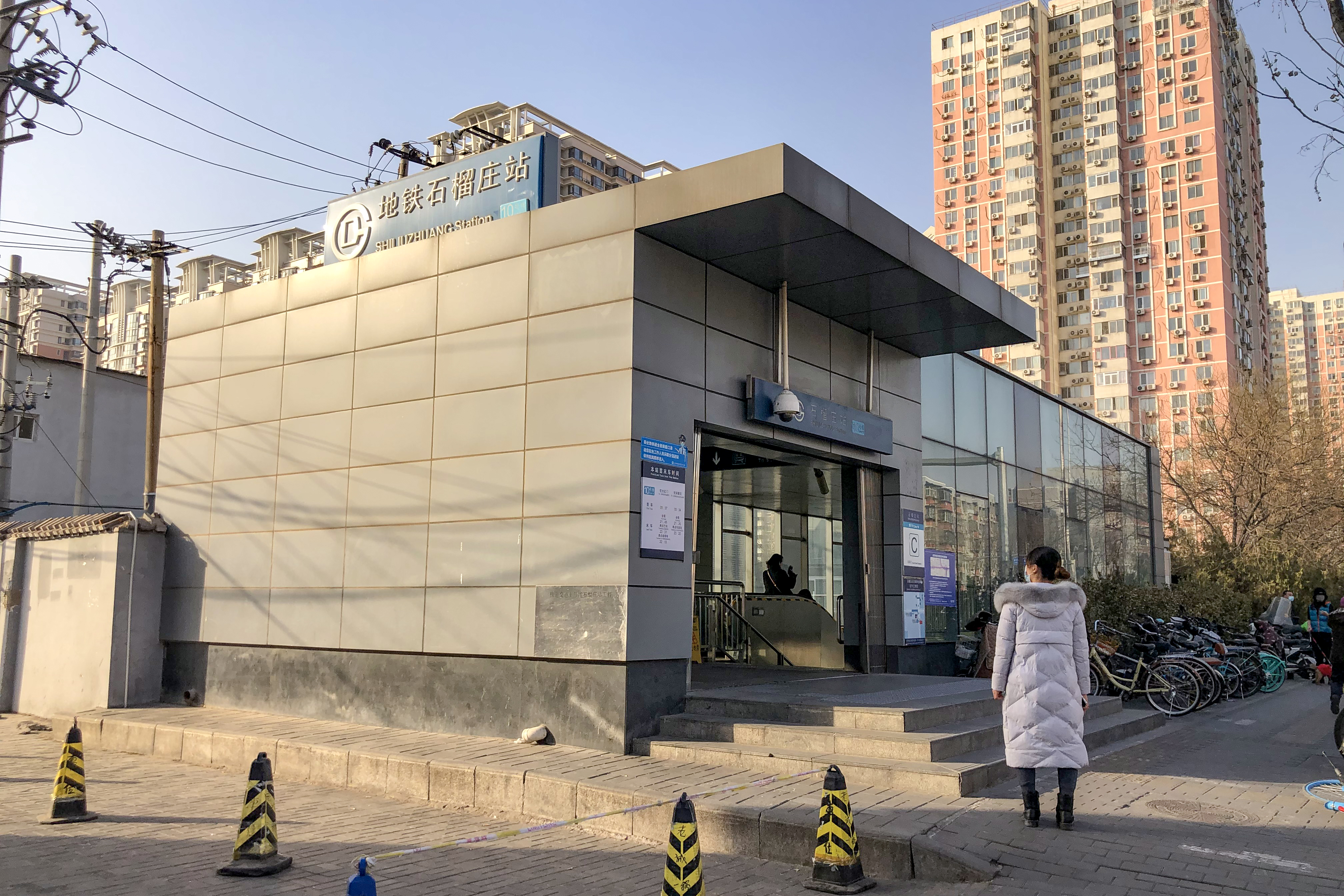
Exit of Shiliuzhuang Station, 2021

== See also ==
- List of township-level divisions of Beijing
