= Fengtai =

Fengtai or Feng-t'ai may refer to:

- Fengtai District, Beijing
  - Beijing Fengtai railway station, station currently under renovation in the district
  - Fengtai Subdistrict, subdivision of Fengtai District
- Fengtai County (凤台县), Huainan, Anhui
- Fengtai, Tianjin, town in and subdivision of Ninghe District, Tianjin
- Fengtai, Gansu, town in and subdivision of Jingchuan County, Gansu
