= Kandan Subdistrict =

Kandan Subdistrict 看丹街道
- Subdistrict
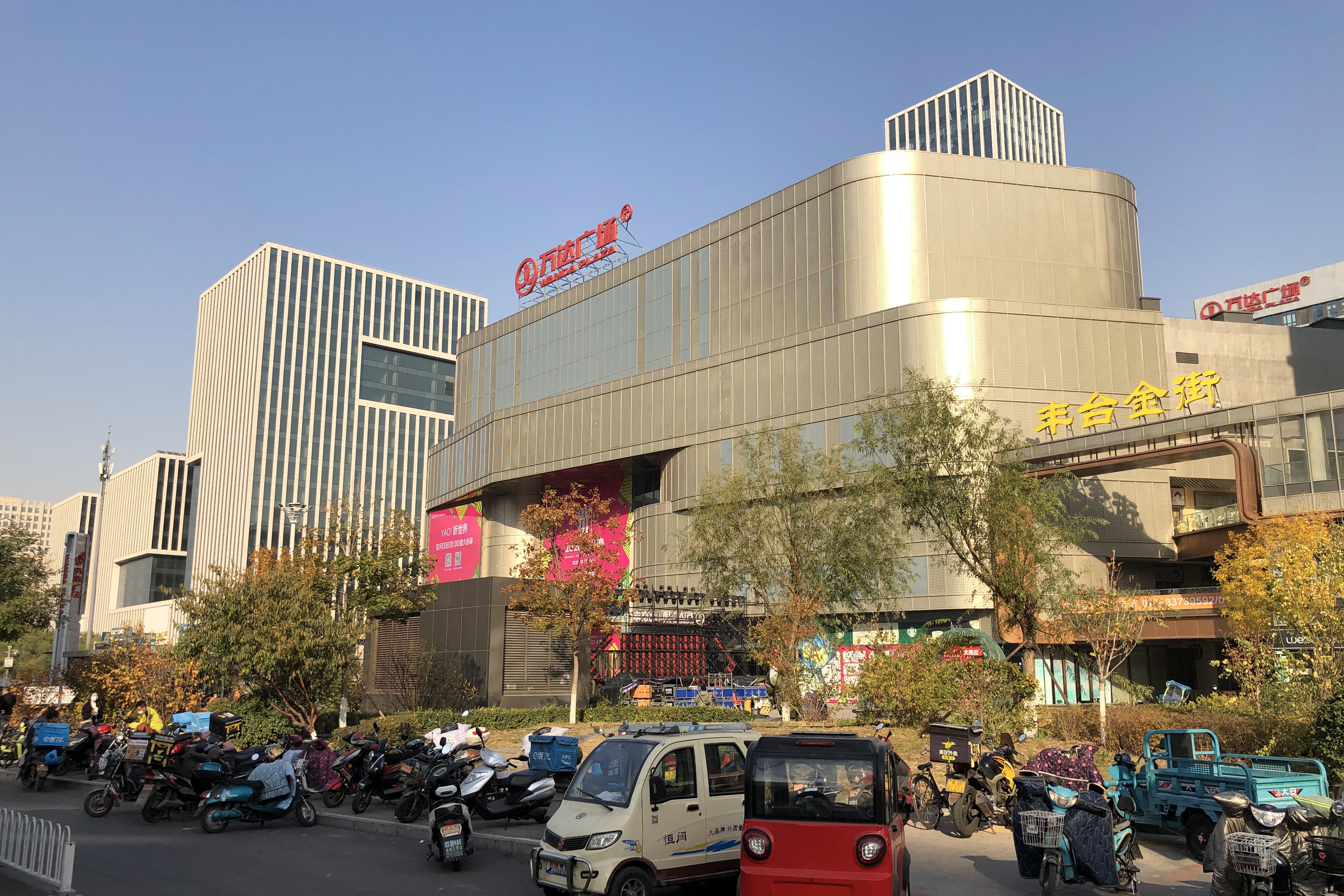
- Fengtai Wanda Plaza within Kandan, 2020

- Location within Beijing Location within China
- Coordinates: 39°49′45″N 116°16′23″E
- Country: China
- Municipality: Beijing
- District: Fengtai
- Village-level Divisions: 16 communities 3 village
- Time zone: UTC+8 (China Standard)
- Postal code: 100070
- Area code: 010

Kandan Subdistrict (Chinese: 看丹街道; pinyin: Kàndān Jiēdào) is a subdistrict located in the southern side of Fengtai District, Beijing, China. It shares border with Wulidian and Fengtai Subdistricts to the north, Xincun and Yuquanying Subdistricts to the east, Huaxiang Subdistrict to the southeast, and Wanping Subdistrict to the west.

This region was recorded in Wanshu Zaji (Chinese: 《宛署杂记》) as "Kandankou". The subdistrict itself was created in 2021.

== Administrative Division ==
In the year 2021, Kandan Subdistrict was made up of 19 subdivisions, of which 16 were communities and 3 were villages:

Administrative Division Code	Community Names	Name Transliteration	Type
110106023001	白盆窑天兴家园	Baipenyao Tianxing Jiayuan	Community
110106023002	四合欣园	Sihe Xinyuan	Community
110106023003	看丹	Kandan	Community
110106023004	富丰园	Fufengyuan	Community
110106023005	育仁里	Yurenli	Community
110106023006	电力机	Dianliji	Community
110106023007	丰西	Fengxi	Community
110106023008	科学城第一	Kexuecheng Diyi	Community
110106023009	科学城第二	Kexuecheng Di'er	Community
110106023010	韩庄子第一	Hanzhuangzi Diyi	Community
110106023011	韩庄子第二	Hanzhuangzi Di'er	Community
110106023012	中海九浩苑	Zhonghai Jiuhaoyuan	Community
110106023013	富锦嘉园	Fujin Jiayuan	Community
110106023014	四季家园	Siji Jiayuan	Community
110106023015	首开华润城	Shoukai Huaruncheng	Community
110106023016	南开西里	Nankai Xili	Community
110106023200	看丹	Kandan	Village
110106023201	榆树庄	Yushuzhuang	Village
110106023202	六圈	Liuquan	Village

== Gallery ==
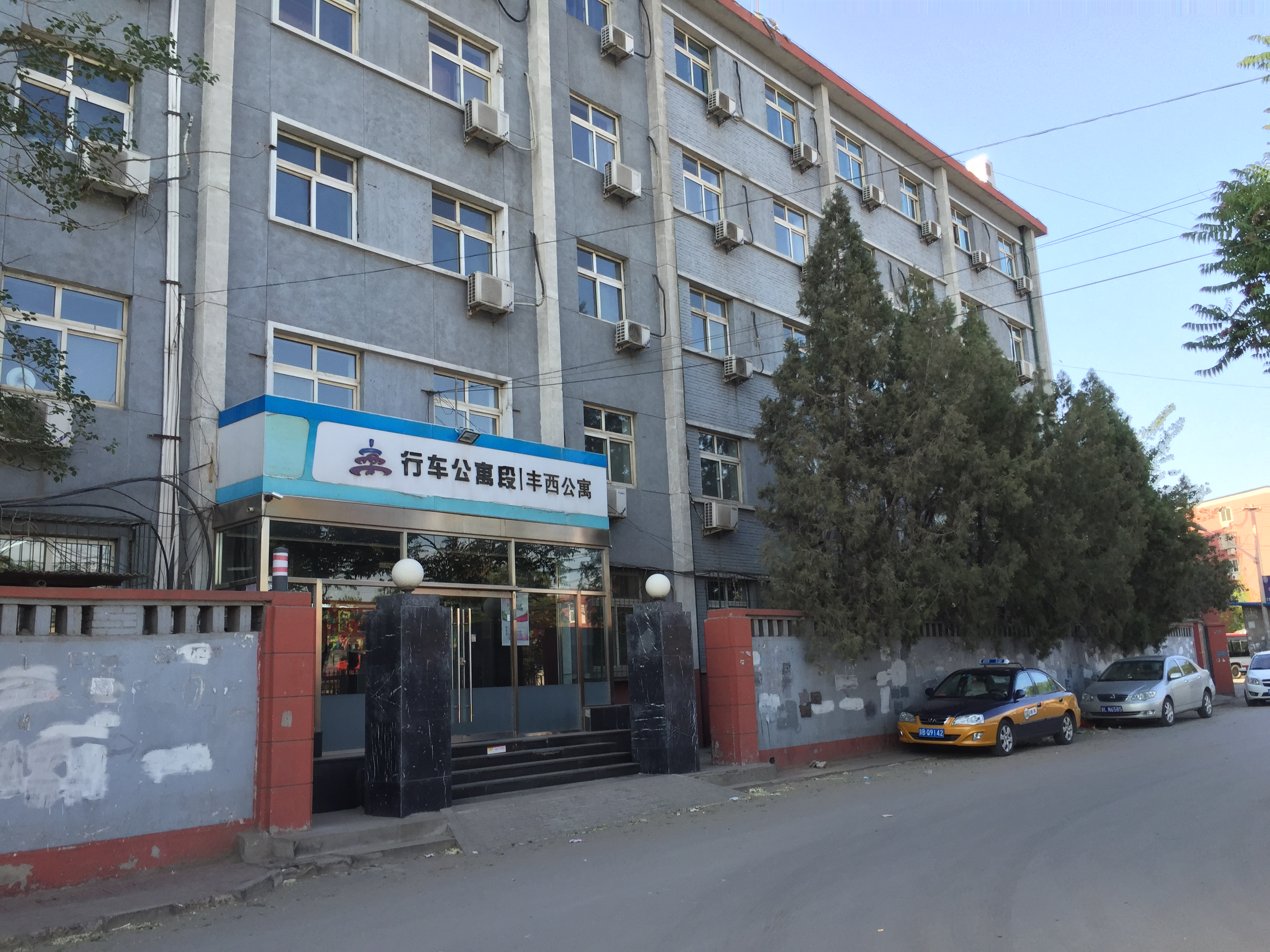
Apartment of Fengtai West Railway Station, 2015

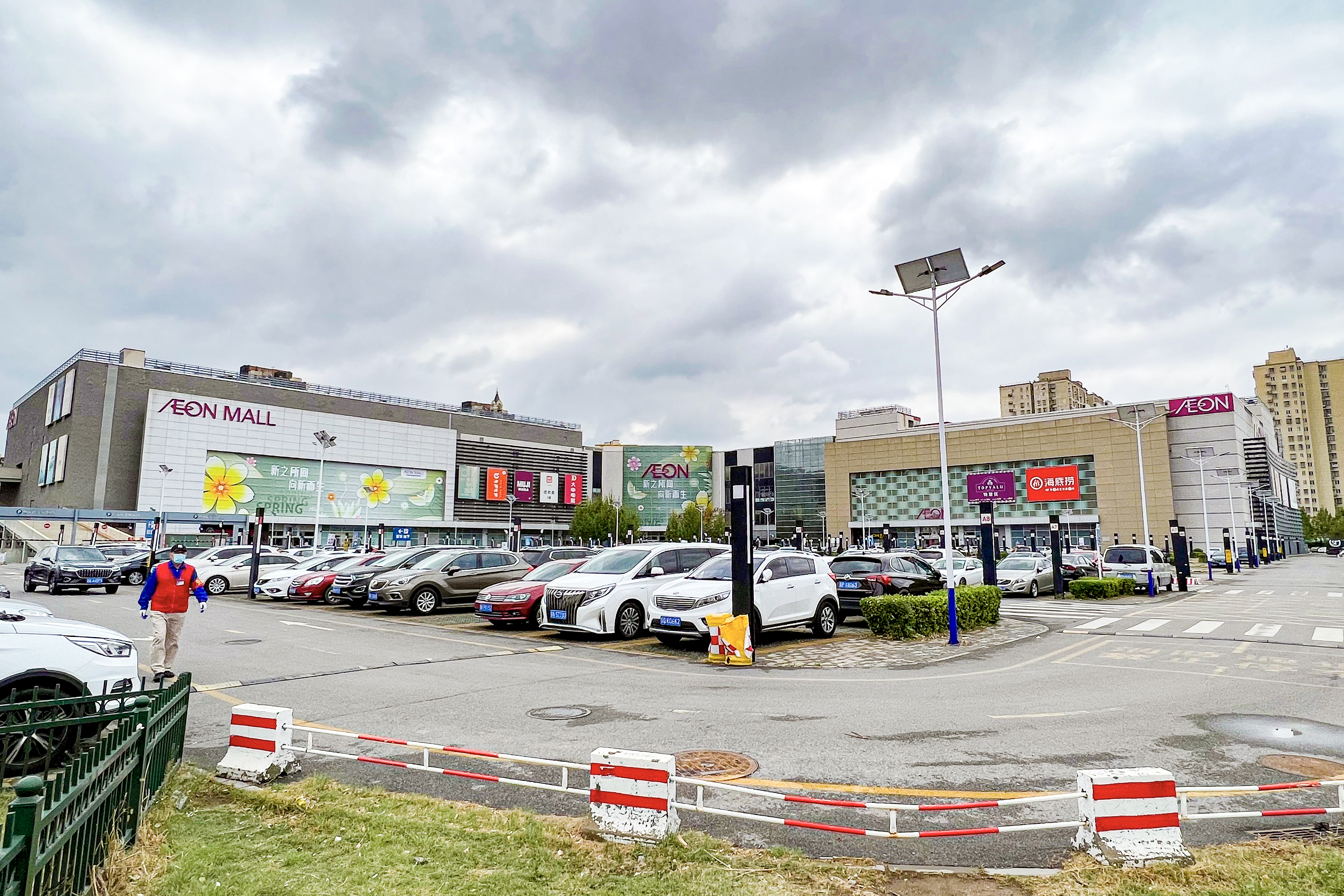
AEON Mall on the south of Kandan, 2022

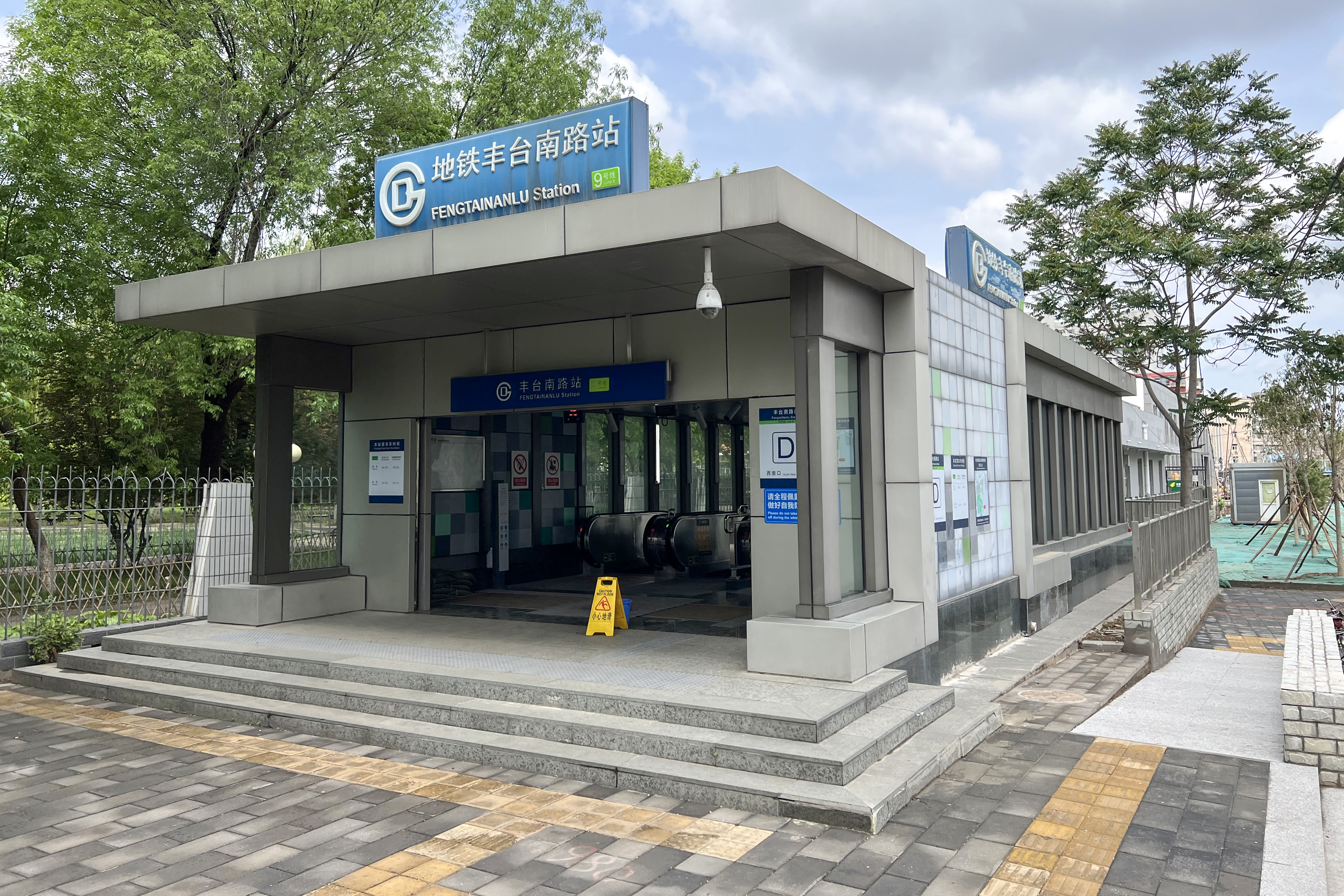
Fengtai Nanlu station, 2022

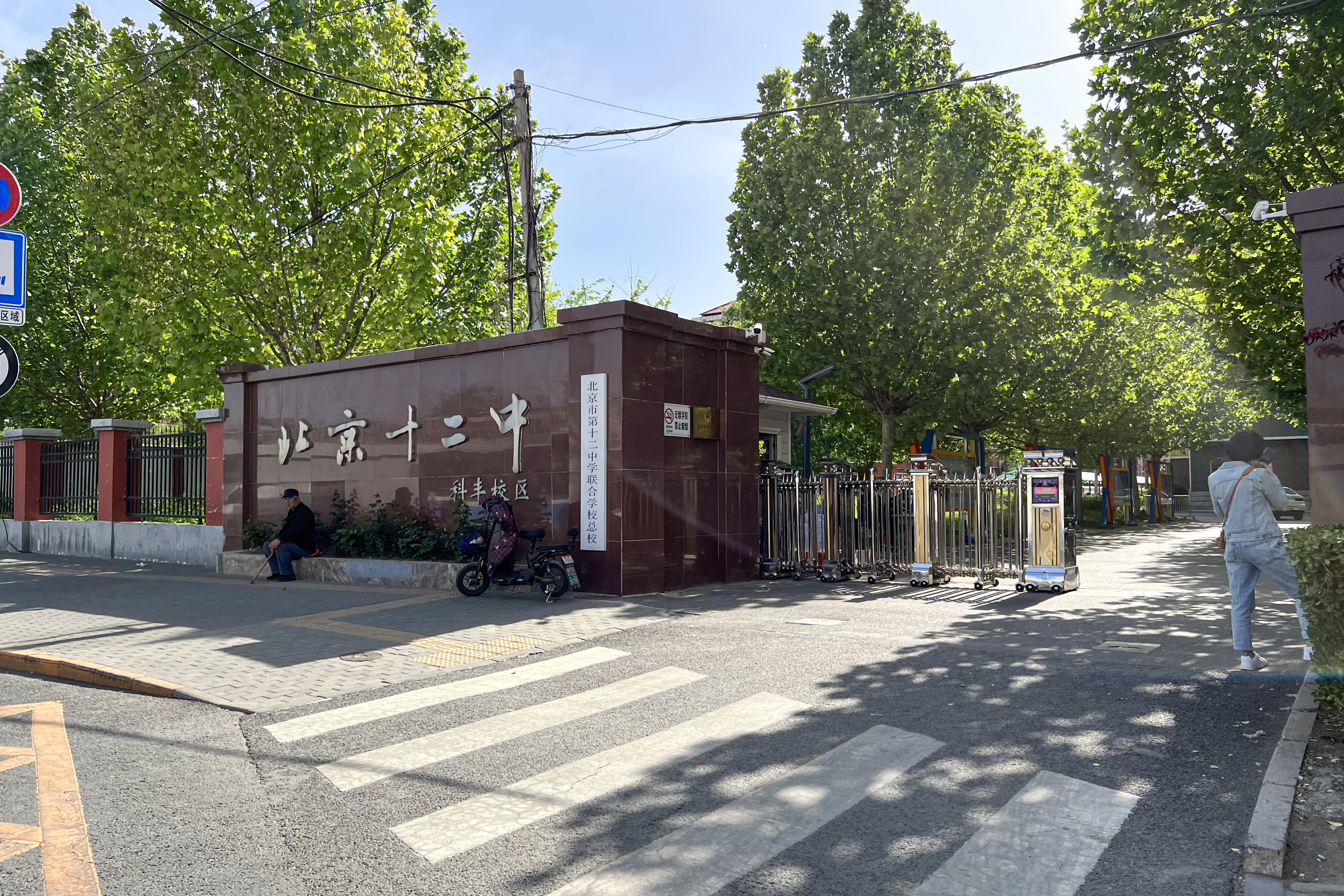
Kefeng Campus of Beijing No.12 High School, 2022

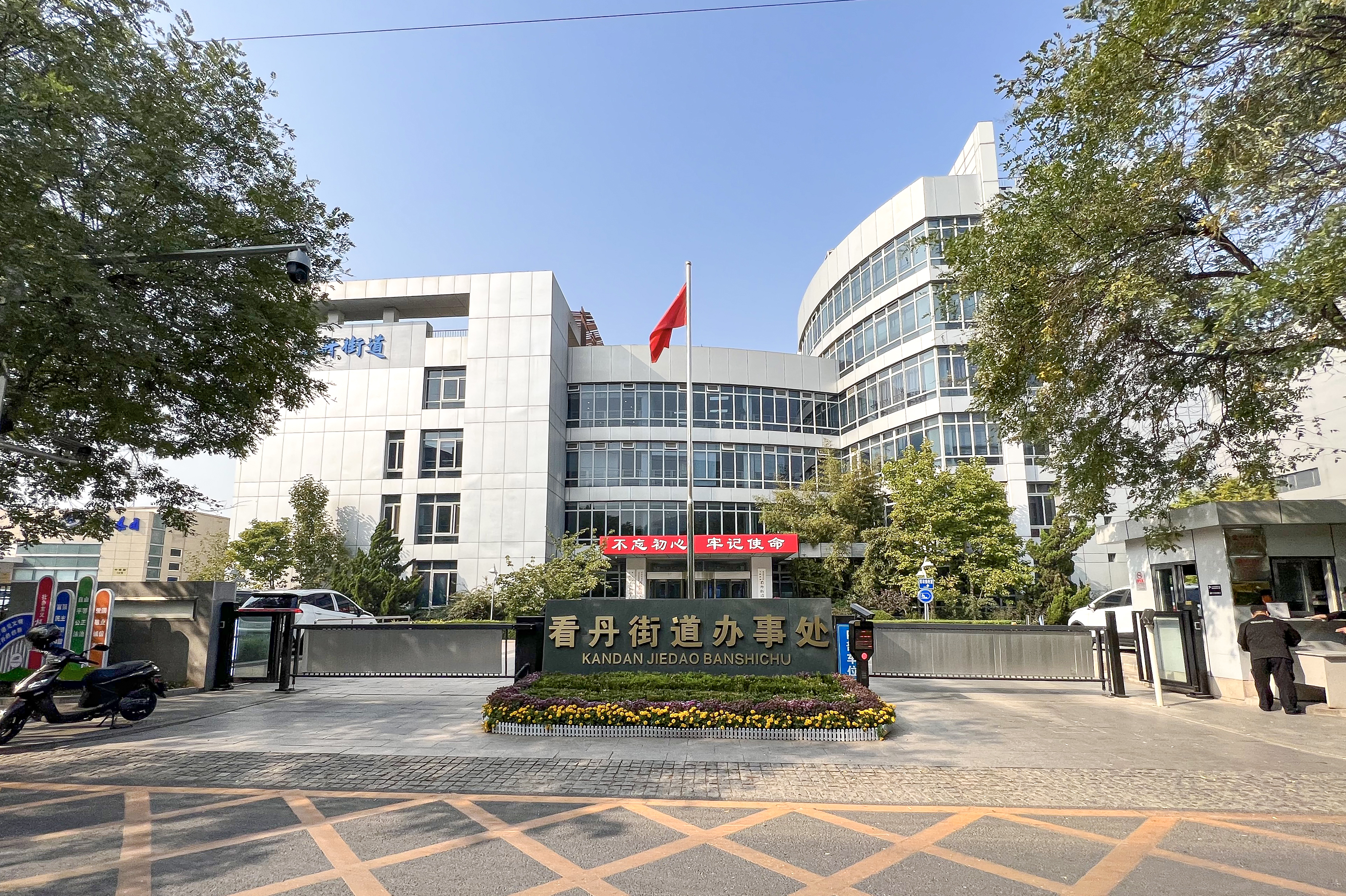
Kandan Subdistrict head office, 2023

== See also ==
- List of township-level divisions of Beijing
