= Qingta Subdistrict =

Qingta Subdistrict 青塔街道
- Subdistrict
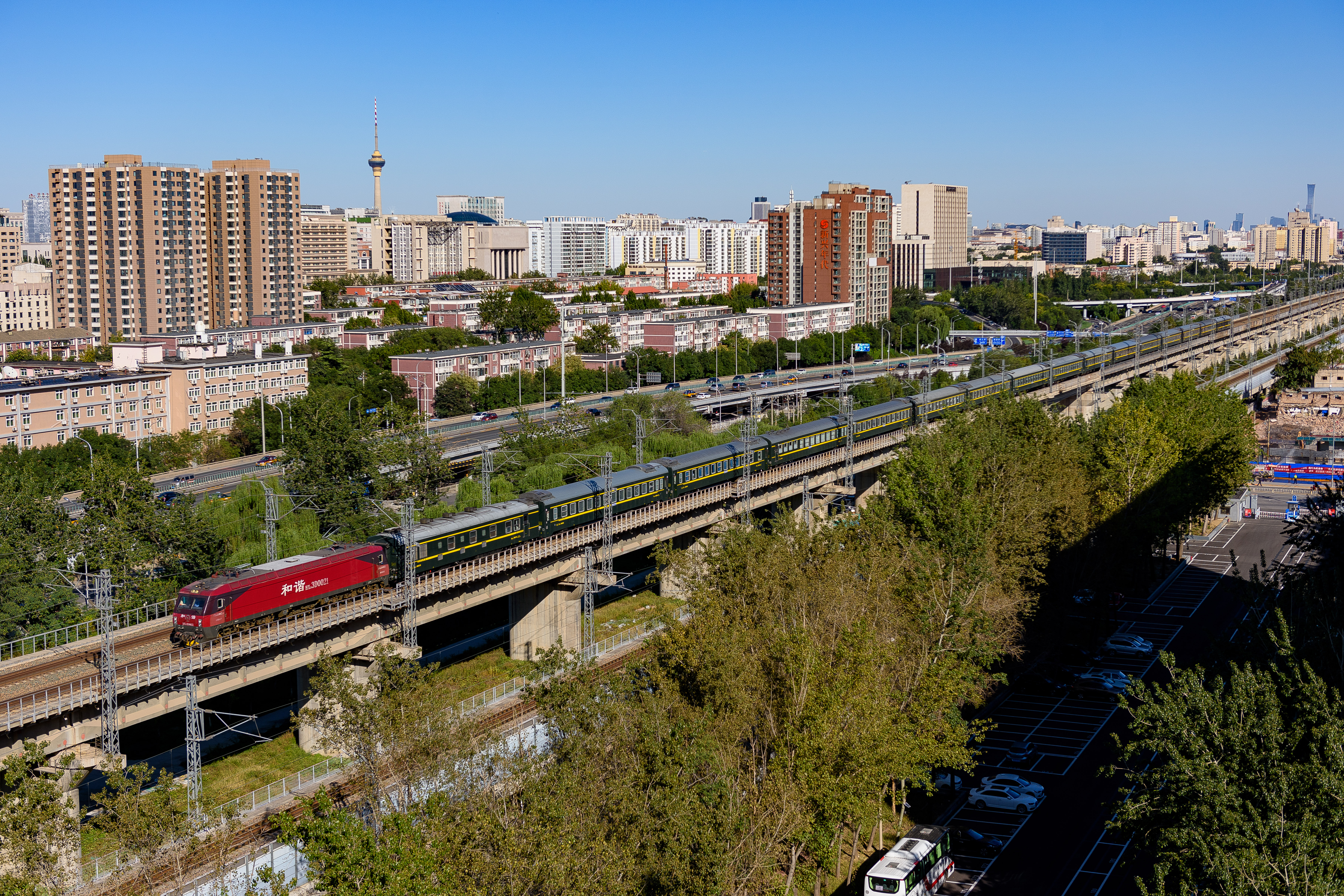
- Aerial view of railway north of Qingta, 2021

- Location within Beijing Location within China
- Coordinates: 39°53′32″N 116°15′16″E
- Country: China
- Municipality: Beijing
- District: Fengtai
- Village-level Divisions: 14 communities 2 village
- Time zone: UTC+8 (China Standard)
- Postal code: 100141
- Area code: 010

Qingta Subdistrict (Chinese: 青塔街道; pinyin: Qīngtǎ Jiēdào) is a subdistrict situated in the northern side of Fengtai District, Beijing, China. It shares border with Wanshou Road Subdistrict to the north, Liuliqiao Subdistrict to the east, and Lugouqiao Subdistrict to the south and west.

The subdistrict was established from portions of Lugouqiao and Liuliqiao Subdistricts in 2021.

== Administrative divisions ==
As of 2023, Qingta Subdistrict consists of 16 subdivisions, of which 14 are communities and 2 villages:

Administrative Division Code	Community Names	Name Transliteration	Type
110106025001	岳各庄	Yuegezhuang	Community
110106025002	青塔东里	Qingta Dongli	Community
110106025003	青塔西里	Qingta Xili	Community
110106025004	蔚园	Weiyuan	Community
110106025005	秀园	Xiuyuan	Community
110106025006	芳园	Fangyuan	Community
110106025007	春园	Chunyuan	Community
110106025008	长安新城第一	Chang'an Xincheng Diyi	Community
110106025009	民岳家园	Minyue Jiayuan	Community
110106025010	长安新城第二	Chang'an Xincheng Di'er	Community
110106025011	汇锦苑	Huijinyuan	Community
110106025012	珠江紫台	Zhujiang Zitai	Community
110106025013	阅园	Yueyuan	Community
110106025014	西府景园	Xifujingyuan	Community
110106025200	郑常庄	Zhengchang	Village
110106025201	岳各庄	Yuegezhuang	Village

== Gallery ==
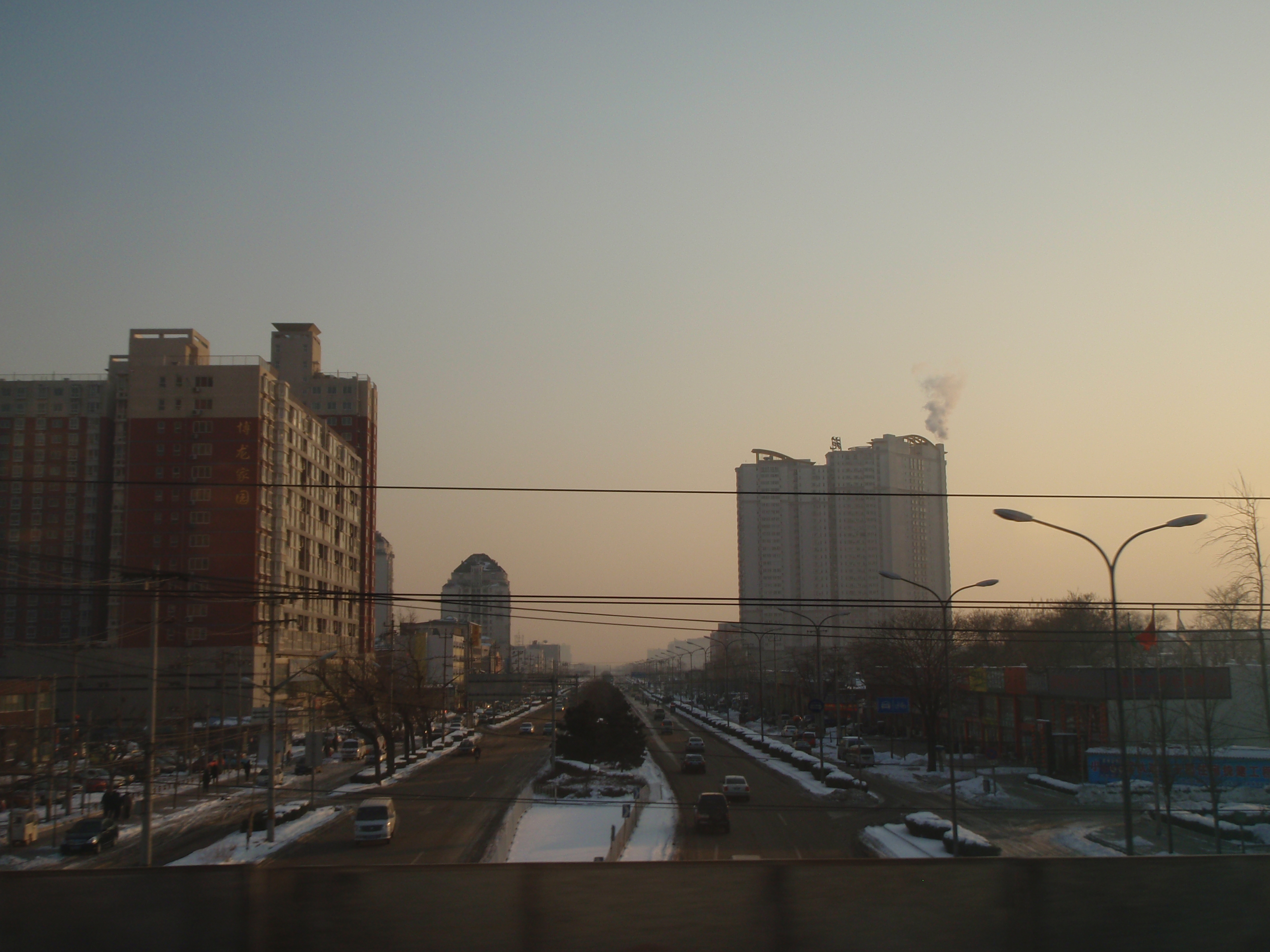
Xiaotun Road, which makes up the western border of Qingta, 2010

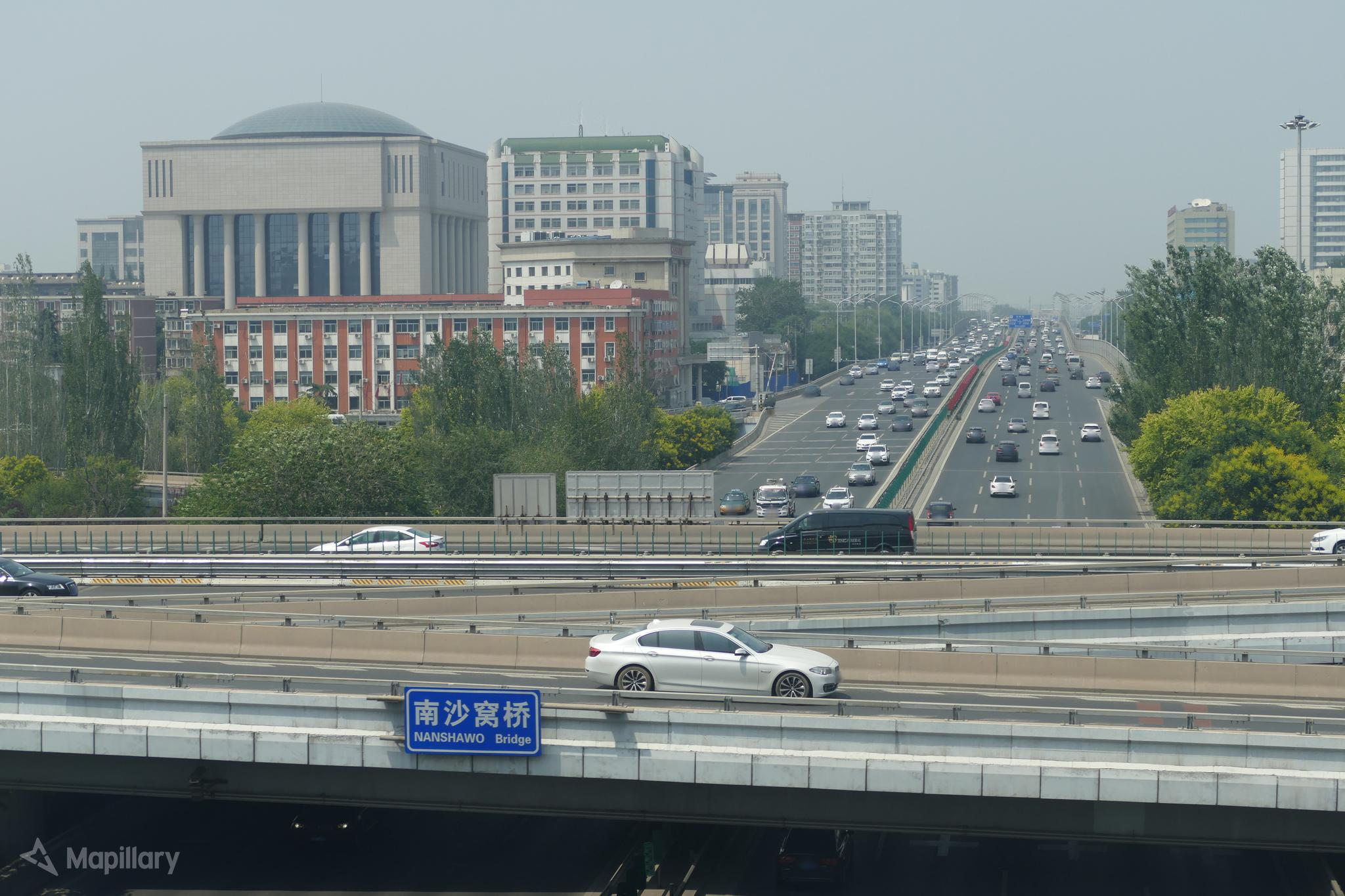
Nanshawo Bridge, 2019

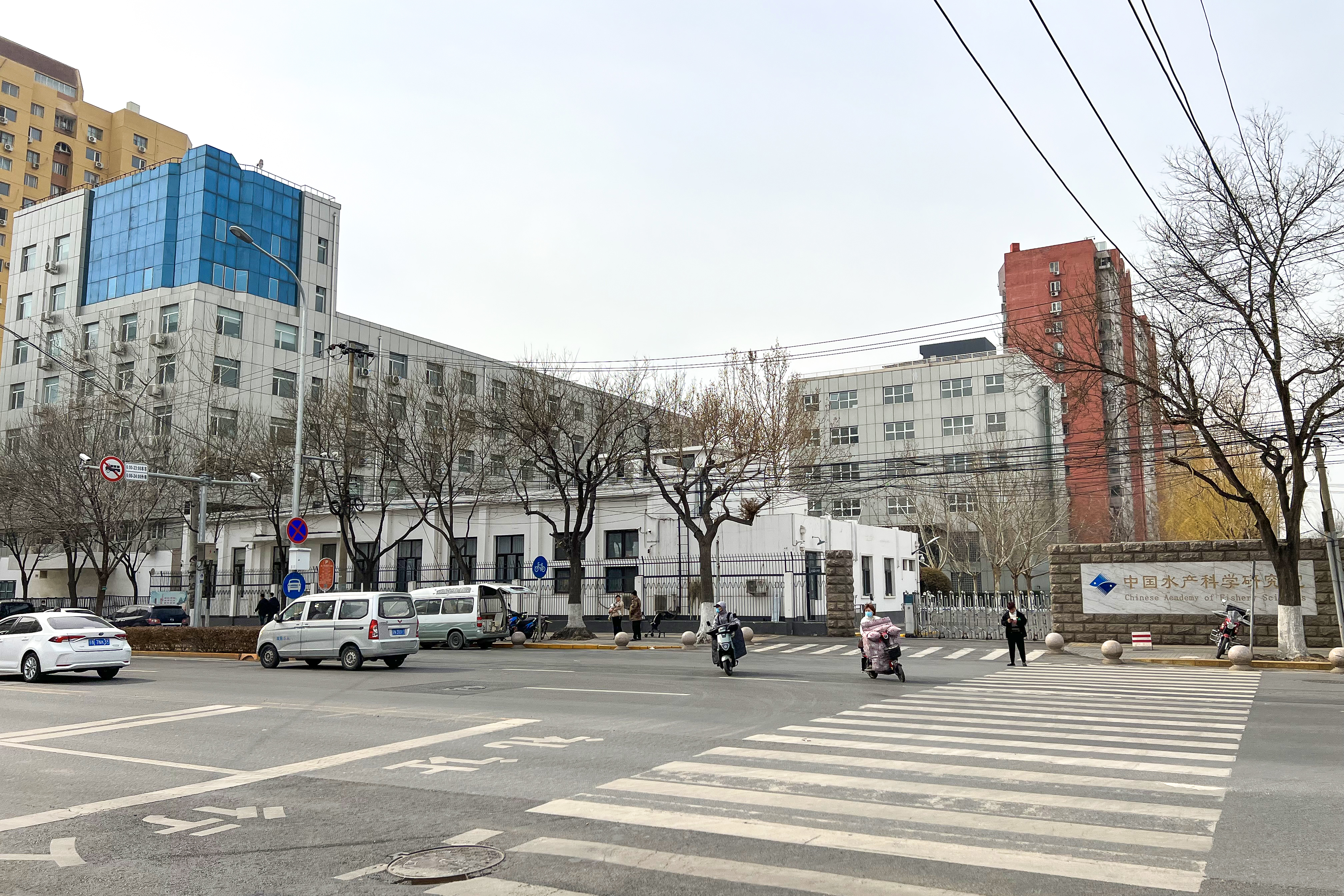
Chinese Academy of Fishery Sciences, 2023

== See also ==
- List of township-level divisions of Beijing
