= Shui'an =

Shui'an may refer to:

- Shuei-an/Shuian Village (水垵村), Wangan, Penghu, Taiwan
- Shuian Village (水安里), Dashu District, Kaohsiung City, Taiwan
- Shui'an Jiayuan (水岸家园), Jiangtai, Beijing
- Shui-an Temple metro station, a metro station of the Taichung Metro

== See also ==
- Shihua Shui'an (世华水岸), Shiliuzhuang Subdistrict, Fengtai District, Beijing, China
