= Donggaodi Subdistrict =

Donggaodi Subdistrict 东高地街道
- Subdistrict
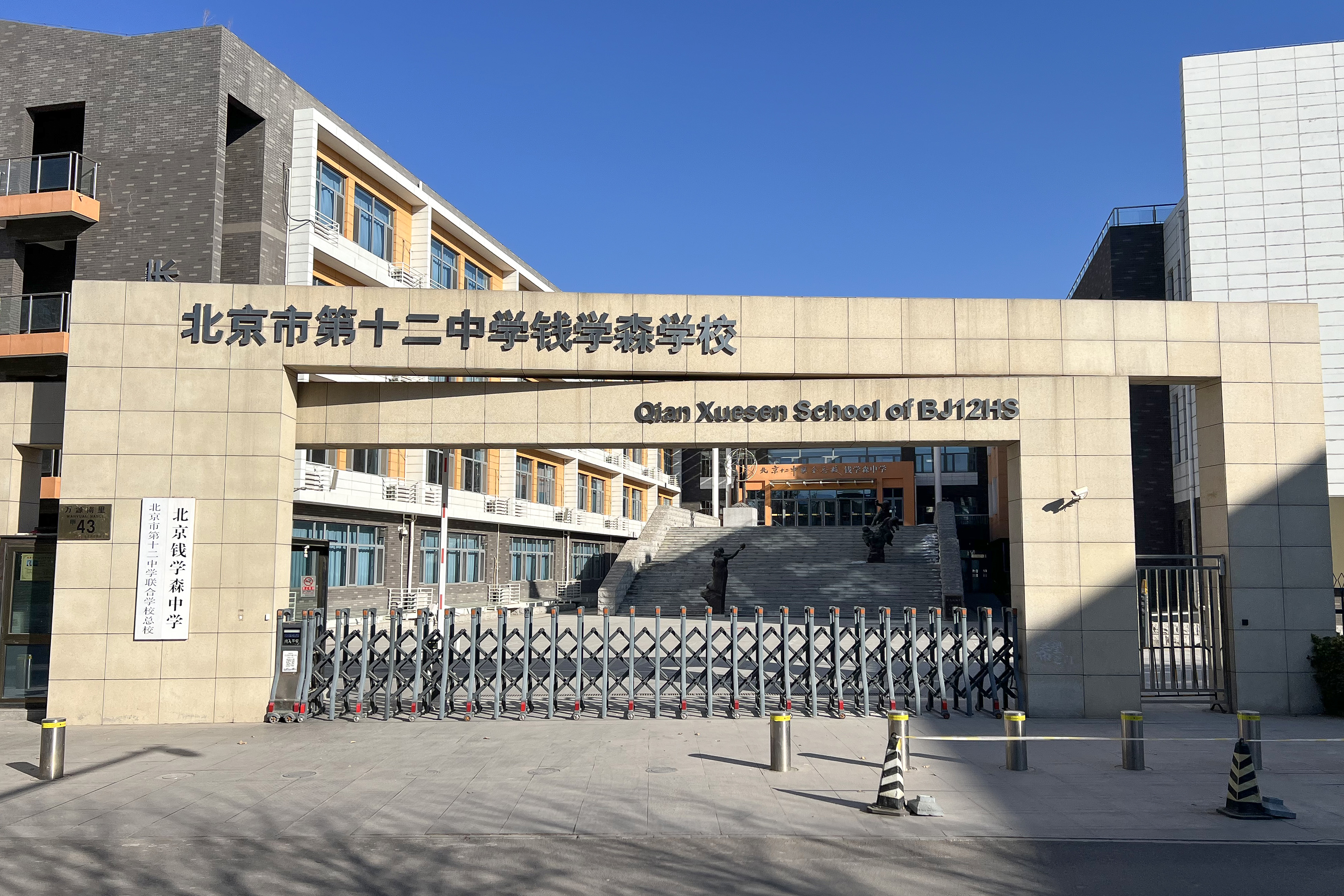
- Beijing Qian Xuesen Middle School within the subdistrict, 2024

- Location within Beijing Location within China
- Coordinates: 39°48′21″N 116°24′52″E
- Country: China
- Municipality: Beijing
- District: Fengtai
- Village-level Divisions: 12 communities

Area
  - Total: 3.48 km^{2} (1.34 sq mi)

Population (2020)
  - Total: 42,705
  - Density: 12,300/km^{2} (31,800/sq mi)
- Time zone: UTC+8 (China Standard)
- Postal code: 100076
- Area code: 010

Donggaodi Subdistrict (Chinese: 东高地街道; pinyin: Dōnggāodì Jiēdào) is a subdistrict on the southeast of Fengtai District, Beijing, China. It is situated south of Nanyuan and Jiugong Townships, west and north of Jiugong Township, and east of Nanyuan Subdistrict. According to the 2020 census of China, Donggaodi has a total population of 42,705 under its jurisdiction.

The subdistrict was named Donggaodi (Chinese: 东高地; lit. 'East High Land') in 1958 for its relatively elevated landscape compare to surrounding region.

== History ==
Timeline of changes in the status of Donggaodi Subdistrict
Years	Status
1949	Part of Nanyuan District
1954	Part of Nanyun Town and Jiugong Township
1958	Established as Donggaodi Subdistrict as a site for the China Academy of Launch Vehicle Technology

== Administrative Division ==
In 2023, the subdistrict consists of 12 communities, which are listed in the table below:

Administrative Division Code	Community Names	Name Transliteration
110106006001	东高地	Donggaodi
110106006002	三角地第一	Sanjiaodi Diyi
110106006003	三角地第二	Sanjiaodi Di'er
110106006004	西洼地	Xiwadi
110106006005	六营门	Liuyingmen
110106006006	万源东里	Wanyuan Dongli
110106006007	万源西里	Wanyuan Xili
110106006008	梅源	Meiyuan
110106006009	东营房	Dongyingfnag
110106006010	万源南里	Wanyuan Nanli
110106006011	东高地北	Donggaodibei
110106006012	东高地南	Donggaodinan

== Landmark ==
- China Aerospace Museum

== See also ==
- List of township-level divisions of Beijing
