= Heyi Subdistrict =

Heyi Subdistrict 和义街道
- Subdistrict
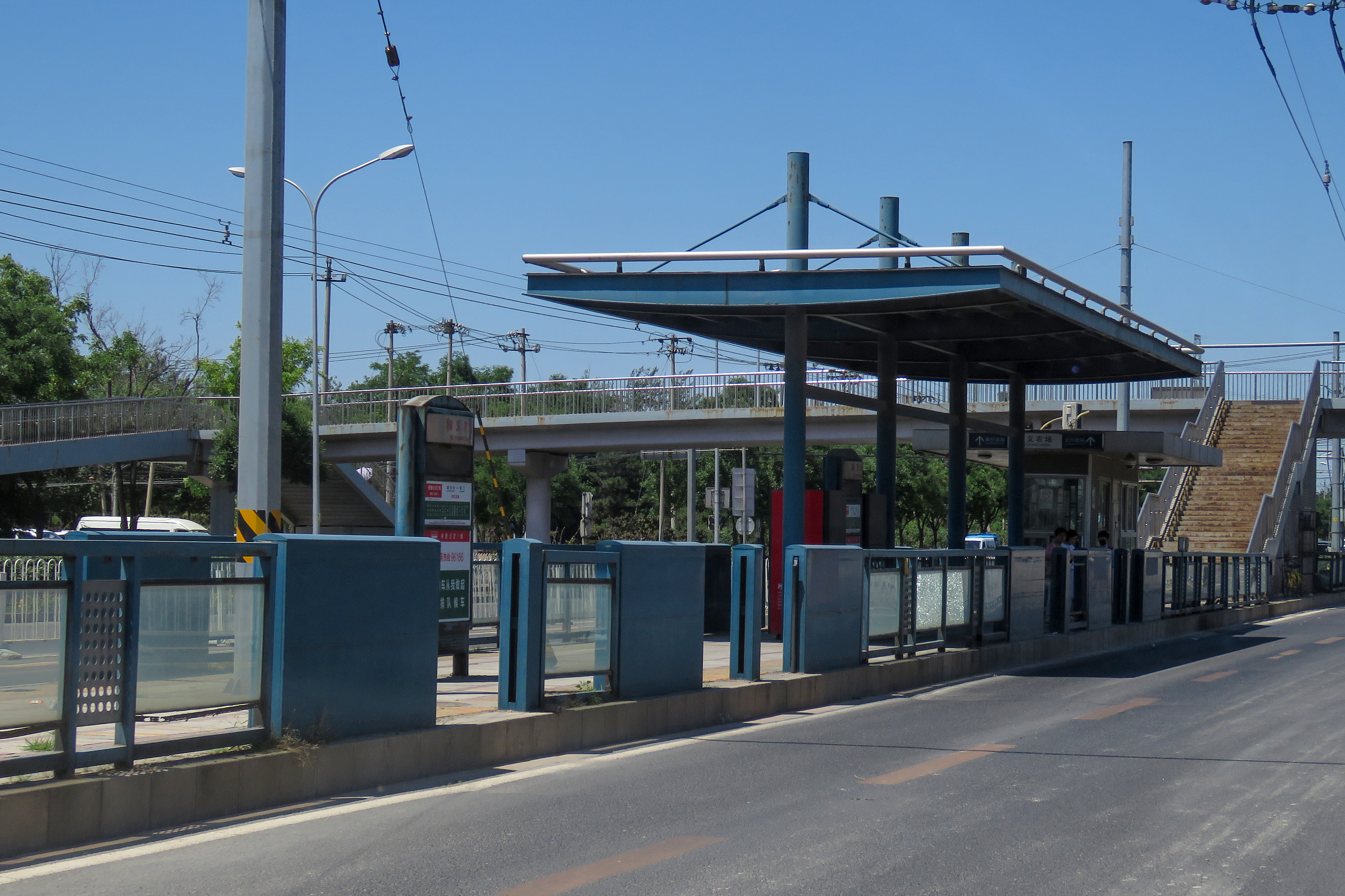
- Heyinongchang Station within the subdistrict, 2018

- Location within Beijing Location within China
- Coordinates: 39°48′41″N 116°23′24″E
- Country: China
- Municipality: Beijing
- District: Fengtai
- Village-level Divisions: 11 communities

Area
  - Total: 4.65 km^{2} (1.80 sq mi)

Population (2020)
  - Total: 40,108
  - Density: 8,630/km^{2} (22,300/sq mi)
- Time zone: UTC+8 (China Standard)
- Postal code: 100076
- Area code: 010

Heyi Subdistrict (Chinese: 和义街道; pinyin: Héyì Jiēdào) is a subdistricts located on the southeast of Fengtai District, Beijing, China. It shares border with Nanyuan Township to the north, Jiugong Township to the east, Nanyuan Subdistrict and Township to the south and west. It has a total of 40,108 residents as of 2020.

== History ==
Prioir to the 1990s, the region around Heyi was part of Daxing District and only developed for agricultural purposes. In 1995, a residential microdistrict was constructed in order to house residents who moved out of Chongwen and Xuanwu Districts, as the two districts were undergoing renovation at the time. The subdistrict was formally created On December 31, 1998. In 2010, Jiujingzhuang Community from Dahongmen Subdistrict was incorporated into Heyi as well.

== Administrative division ==
As of 2023, Heyi Subdistrict comprises 11 communities:

Administrative Division Code	Community Names	Name Transliteration
110106016001	和义东里第一	Heyi Dongli Diyi
110106016002	和义东里第二	Heyi Dongli Di'er
110106016003	和义东里第三	Heyi Dongli Disan
110106016004	南苑北里第一	Nanyuan Beili Diyi
110106016005	南苑北里第二	Nanyuan Beili Di'er
110106016006	和义西里第一	Heyi Xili Diyi
110106016007	和义西里第二	Heyi Xili Di'er
110106016008	和义西里第三	Heyi Xili Disan
110106016009	久敬庄	Jiujingzhuang
110106016010	大红门锦苑二	Dahongmen Jinyuan'er
110106016011	大红门锦苑一	Dahongmen Jinyuanyi

== See also ==
- List of township-level divisions of Beijing
