= China Aerospace Museum =

Museum in Beijing, China

- 中华航天博物馆
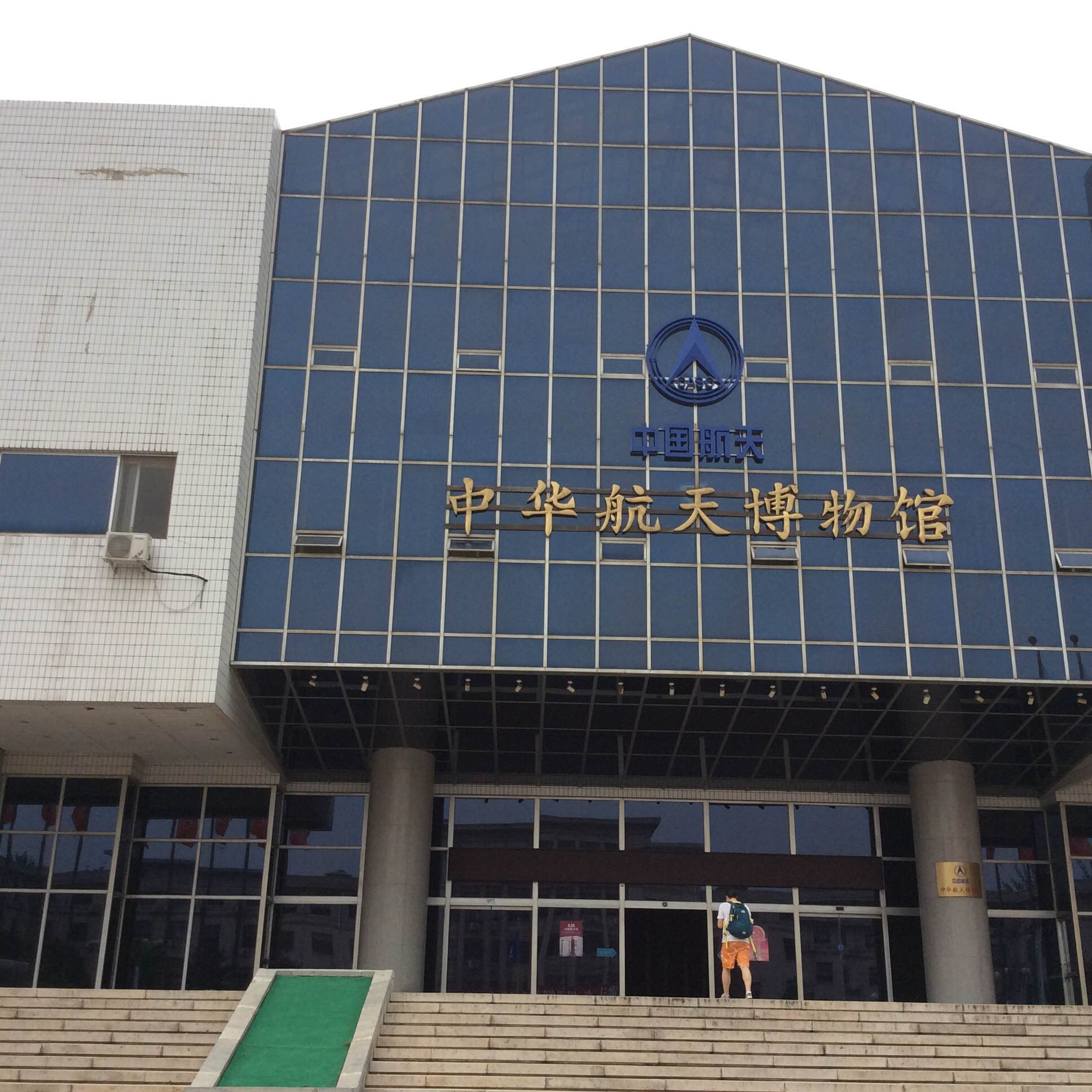
- The outside of the space museum.

- Location within Beijing
- Established: March 1992
- Location: Fengtai District, Beijing, China
- Coordinates: 39.7990°N 116.4087°E
- Website: www.casc-spacemuseum.com

The China Aerospace Museum (Chinese: 中华航天博物馆) is a museum in Fengtai District, Beijing. It highlights the technologies of the Chinese Space Program. The museum has an area of more than 10,000 square meters. The museum was founded in October 1992. The museum has not been rated.

China Space Museum is 3 floors with a 1,000 square metres (11,000 sq ft) of dedicated exhibition halls open to the general public.

On display at the two hall are:

- Carrier rockets
- Crewed spacecraft
- Satellites
- Moon exploration apparatus
- Section dedicate to China's space industry
