= Xincun Subdistrict, Beijing =

Xincun Subdistrict 新村街道
- Subdistrict
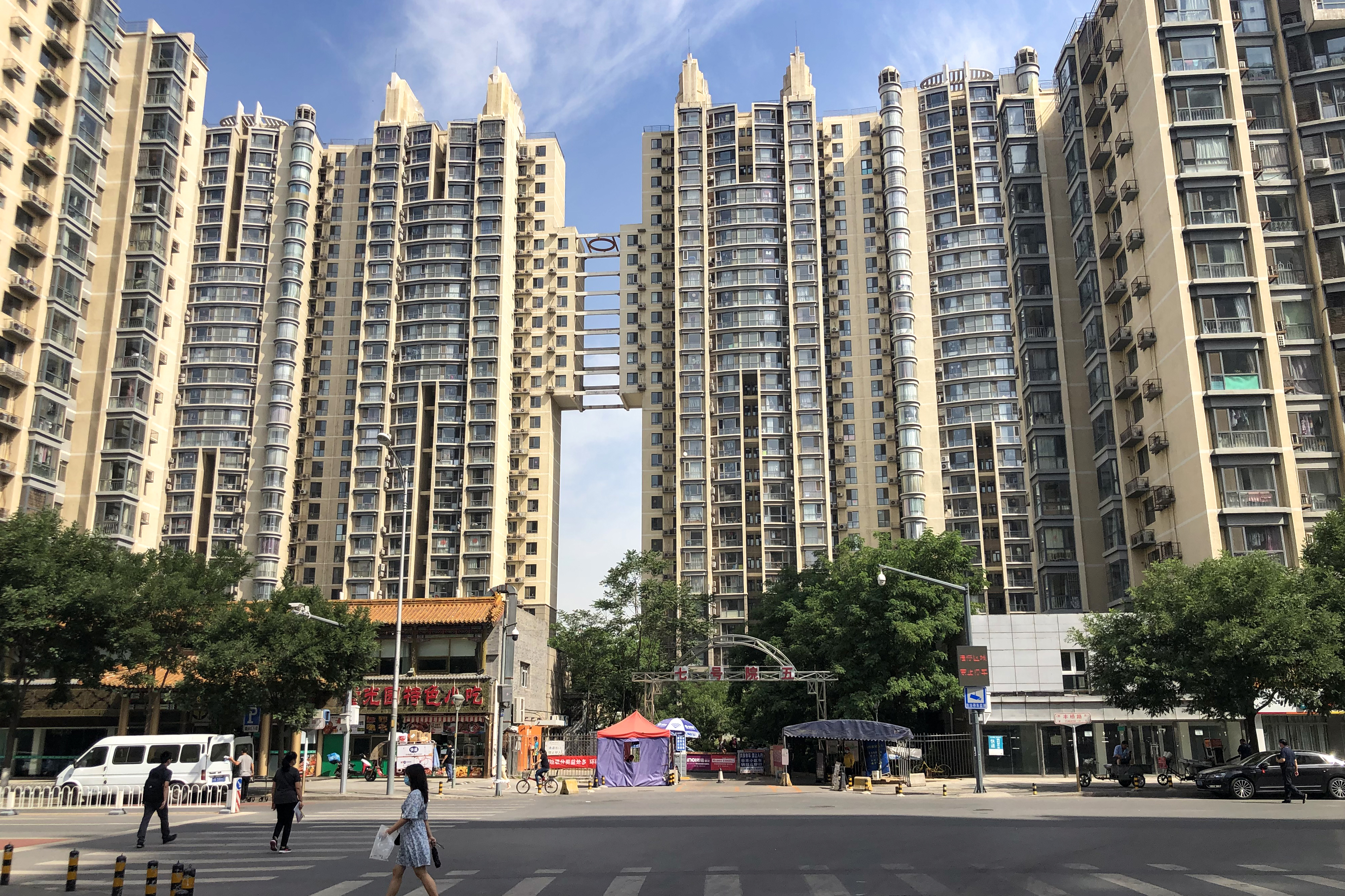
- Sanhuanxincheng Community within the subdistrict, 2020

- Location within Beijing Location within China
- Coordinates: 39°50′18″N 116°18′08″E
- Country: China
- Municipality: Beijing
- District: Fengtai
- Village-level Divisions: 18 communities 1 village

Area
  - Total: 13.06 km^{2} (5.04 sq mi)

Population (2020)
  - Total: 204,697
  - Density: 15,670/km^{2} (40,590/sq mi)
- Time zone: UTC+8 (China Standard)
- Postal code: 100070
- Area code: 010

Xincun Subdistrict (Chinese: 新村街道; pinyin: Xīncūn Jiēdào) is a subdistricts on the eastern Fengtai District, Beijing, China. It borders the following places: Fengtai Subdistrict to the north, Huaxiang Township to the east, south and west, and Wanping Subdistrict to the southwest. It has 204,697 residents as of 2020.

The name of the subdistrict (Chinese: 新村; lit. 'New Village') originated in 1957, where a new dorminitory was constructed in the area for local factory workers and their families.

== History ==
History of Xincun Subdistrict
Years	Status
1958	Created as Xincun Subdistrict
1965	Incorporated Zaojia, Hanzhuangzi and Fanjia Villages
1970	Incorporated Kandang, Caoqiao, Yuquanying and land south of Fengtai Railway
1983	Merged with People's Commune of Huangtugang to form Huangtugang Area
1987	Restored as a subdistrict
2021	Borders was redrawn

== Administrative Division ==
At the end of 2021, Xincun Subdistrict is divided into 19 subdivisions, with 18 communities and 1 village:

Administrative Division Code	Community Names	Name Transliteration	Type
110106010003	育芳园	Yufangyuan	Community
110106010008	桥梁厂第一	Qiaoliangchang Diyi	Community
110106010009	桥梁厂第二	Qiaoliangchang Di'er	Community
110106010010	造甲南里	Zaojia Nanli	Community
110106010011	造甲村	Zaojiacun	Community
110106010015	怡海花园	Yihai Huayuan	Community
110106010025	三环新城第一	Sanhuan Xincheng Diyi	Community
110106010026	万年花城第一	Wannian Huacheng Diyi	Community
110106010027	三环新城第二	Sanhuan Xincheng Di'er	Community
110106010028	三环新城第三	Sanhuan Xincheng Disan	Community
110106010029	万年花城第二	Wannian Huacheng Di'er	Community
110106010030	芳菲路	Fangfeilu	Community
110106010031	首经贸中街	Shoujingmao Zhongjie	Community
110106010032	优筑	Youzhu	Community
110106010034	鸿业兴园	Hongye Xingyuan	Community
110106010038	鸿业兴园南	Hongye Xingyuannan	Community
110106010041	育菲园	Yufeiyuan	Community
110106010042	刘孟家园	Liumeng Jiayuan	Community
110106010200	樊家	Fanjia	Village

== Landmark ==
- Dabaotai Western Han Dynasty Mausoleum

== See also ==
- List of township-level divisions of Beijing
