= Changxindian Subdistrict =

Changxindian Subdistrict 长辛店街道
- Subdistrict
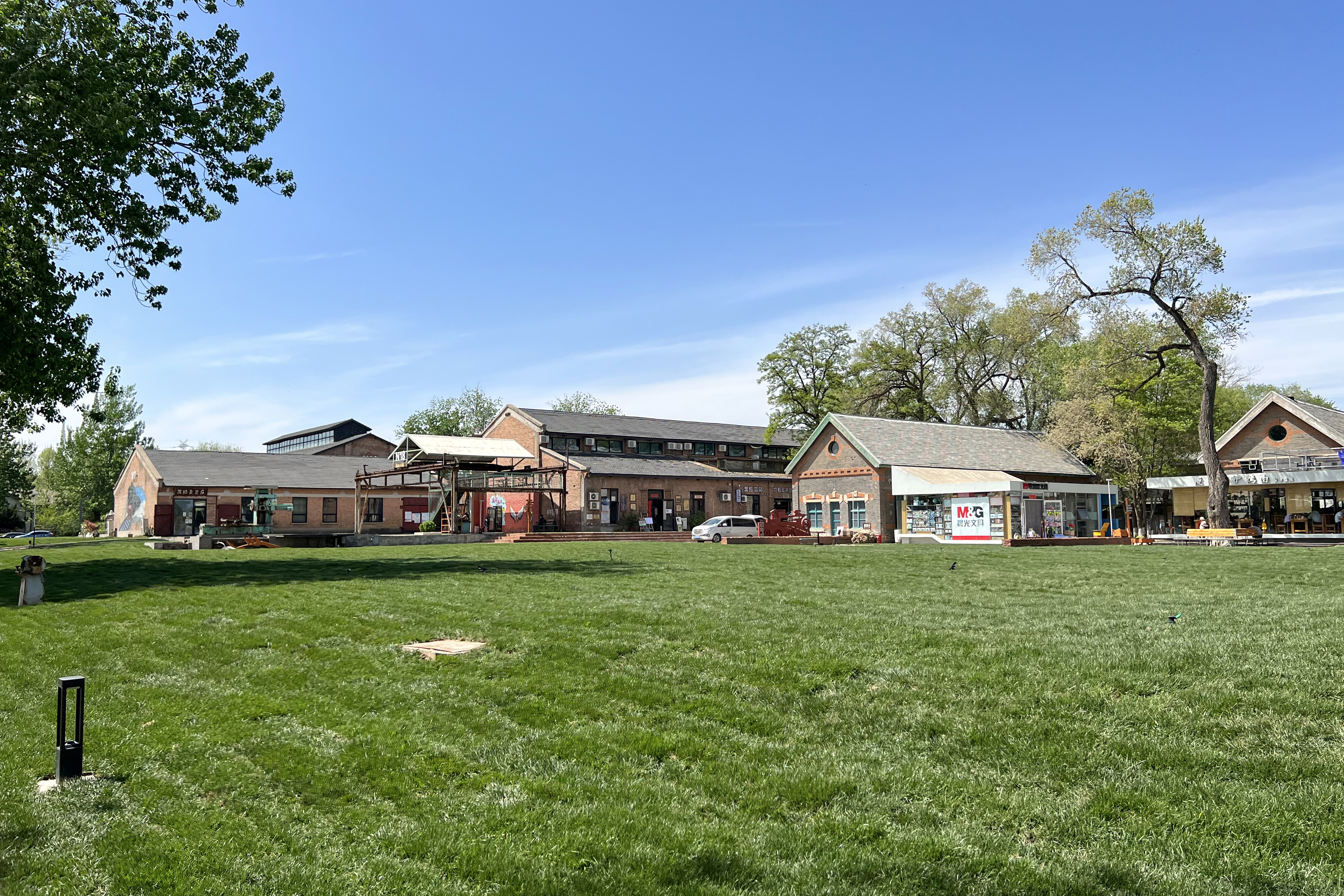
- An early building of CRRC Beijing 2/7 Locomotive Company within the subdistrict, 2022

- Location within Beijing Location within China
- Coordinates: 39°49′30″N 116°12′16″E
- Country: China
- Municipality: Beijing
- District: Fengtai
- Village-level Divisions: 18 communities 2 village

Area
  - Total: 10.92 km^{2} (4.22 sq mi)

Population (2020)
  - Total: 85,636
  - Density: 7,842/km^{2} (20,310/sq mi)
- Time zone: UTC+8 (China Standard)
- Postal code: 100072
- Area code: 010

Changxindian Subdistrict (Chinese: 长辛店街道; pinyin: Chángxīndiàn Jiēdào) is a subdistrict located on the west of Fengtai District, Beijing, China. It borders Lugouqiao Subdistrict to the northeast, Changyang Town to the southeast, and is enclosed by Changxindian Town around it. The subdistrict has a 2020 census population of 85646.

Changxindian (Chinese: 长辛店; lit. 'Long Pungent Shop'), the current name of the subdistrict, comes from two villages that existed in the region during Ming dynasty: Changdian and Xindian. They were merged into Changxindian during the later Qing dynasty.

== History ==
Timeline of Changxindian Subdistrict
Years	Status
1912	Part of Wanping County under Beijing
1928	Transferred as Changxindian Town into Hebei along with rest of Wanping County
1937	Following the Marco Polo Bridge Incident, the government of Wanping County moved into Changxindian Town
1948	Part of the 18th District of Beijing
1949	Local government was established
1950	Converted to town and transferred under Fengtai District
1974	Several Communities from Zhujiafen Subdistrict were incorporated into Changxindian
1990	Converted to a subdistrict
2021	4 communities of Changxindian were transferred to Yungang Subdistrict

== Administrative Division ==
As of 2023, Changxindian Subdistrict is divided into 20 subdivisions, with 18 communities and 2 villages:

Administrative Division Code	Community Names	Name Transliteration	Type
110106011001	南墙缝	Nanqiangfeng	Community
110106011002	合成公	Hechenggong	Community
110106011003	东山坡	Dongshanpo	Community
110106011004	北关	Beiguan	Community
110106011005	西峰寺	Xifengsi	Community
110106011006	朱家坟南区	Zhujiafen Nanqu	Community
110106011008	朱家坟北区	Zhujiafen Beiqu	Community
110106011010	赵辛店	Zhaoxindian	Community
110106011011	北岗洼	Beigangwa	Community
110106011012	崔村二里	Cuicun Erli	Community
110106011014	建设里	Jiansheli	Community
110106011015	东南街	Dongnanjie	Community
110106011016	陈庄	Chenzhuang	Community
110106011017	光明里	Guangmingli	Community
110106011019	玉皇庄	Yuhuangzhuang	Community
110106011028	长馨园	Changxinli	Community
110106011029	中奥嘉园	Zhong'ao Jiayuan	Community
110106011030	中体奥园	Zhongti'aoyuan	Community
110106011200	长辛店	Changxindian	Village
110106011201	赵辛店	Zhaoxindian	Village

== See also ==
- List of township-level divisions of Beijing
