= Chengshousi Subdistrict =

Chengshousi Subdistrict 成寿寺街道
- Subdistrict
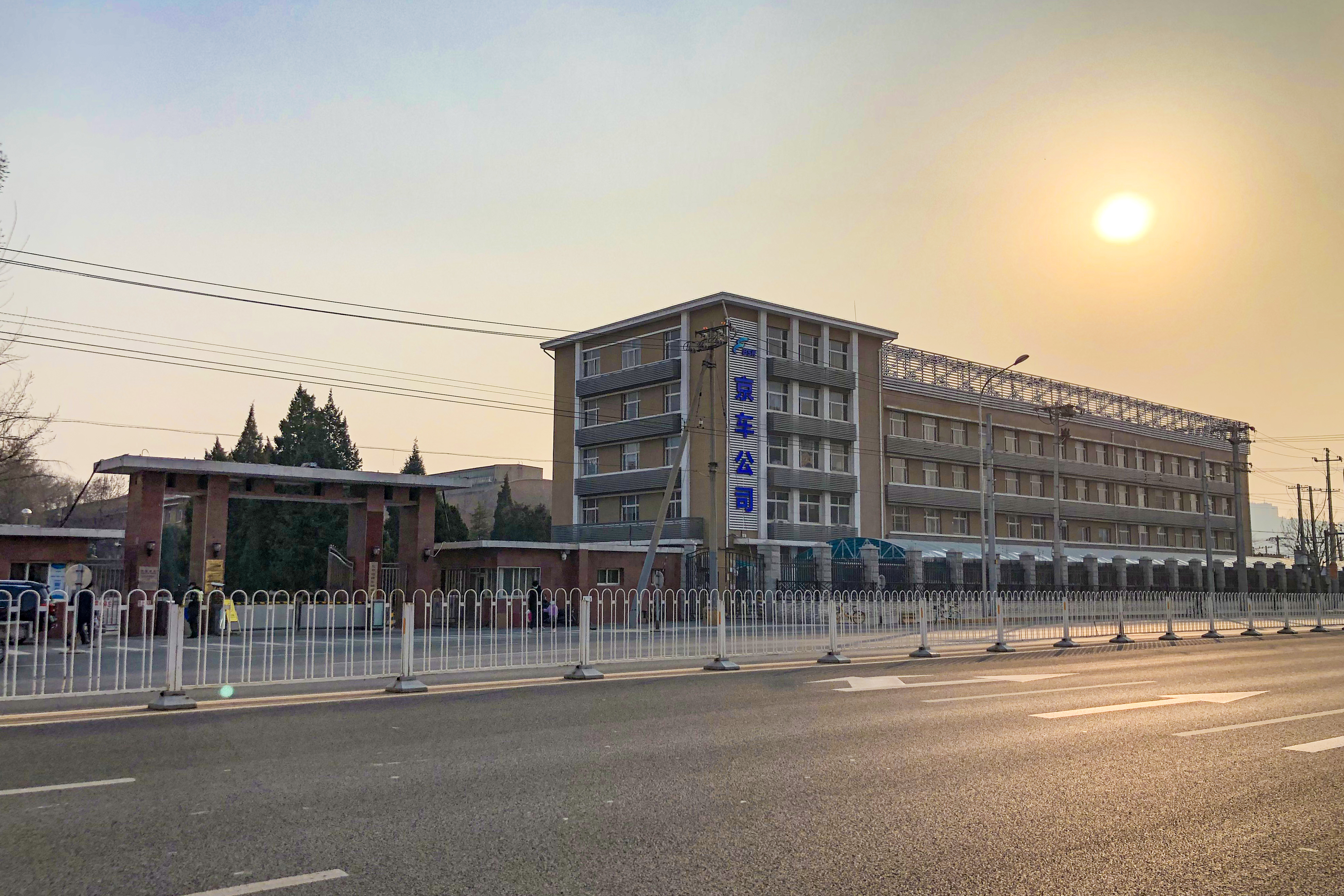
- Beijing Subway Rolling Stock Equipment Headquarter within Chengshousi, 2021

- Location within Beijing Location within China
- Coordinates: 39°51′13″N 116°21′46″E
- Country: China
- Municipality: Beijing
- District: Fengtai
- Village-level Divisions: 7 communities 1 village
- Time zone: UTC+8 (China Standard)
- Postal code: 100164
- Area code: 010

Chengshousi Subdistrict (Chinese: 成寿寺街道; pinyin: Chéngshòusì Jiēdào) is a subdistrict situated on the northeastern portion of Fengtai District, Beijing, China. It borders Fangzhuang Subdistrict to its north, Shibalidian Township to its east, Xiaohongmen Township to its south, and Shiliuzhuang Subdistrict to its west.

The subdistrict was created in 2021 from parts of Dongtiejiangying and Dahongmen Subdistricts, as well as part of Nanyuan Township. Its name Chengshousi is inherited from Chengshou Temple, a Buddhist temple that once existed in the area.

== History ==
History of Chengshousi Subdistrict
Year	Status	Part of
1949 - 1950		15th District
1950 - 1952		11th District
1952 - 1953		Nanyuan District
1953 - 1956	Chengshousi Township Fenzhongsi Township	Nanyuan District
1956 - 1958	Part of Dongtiejiangying Subdistrict	Nanyuan District
1958 - 1984	Part of Dongtiejiangying Subdistrict	Fengtai District
1984 - 1987	Chengshousi Township Fenzhongsi Township	Fengtai District
1987 - 2021	Part of Nanyuan Township	Fengtai District
2021–present	Chengshousi Subdistrict	Fengtai District

== Administrative division ==
As of 2023, Chengshousi Subdistrict administrates 8 subdivisions, of which 7 are communities and 1 is a village:

Administrative Division Code	Community Names	Name Transliterations	Type
110106020001	四方景园	Sifang Jingyuan	Community
110106020002	华苇景苑	Huawei Jingyuan	Community
110106020003	四方景园第二	Sifang Jingyuan Di'er	Community
110106020004	成寿寺	Chengshousi	Community
110106020005	成仪路	Chengyilu	Community
110106020006	方南家园	Fangnanjiayuan	Community
110106020007	瑞成街	Ruichengjie	Community
110106020200	分中寺	Fenzhongsi	Village

== Gallery ==
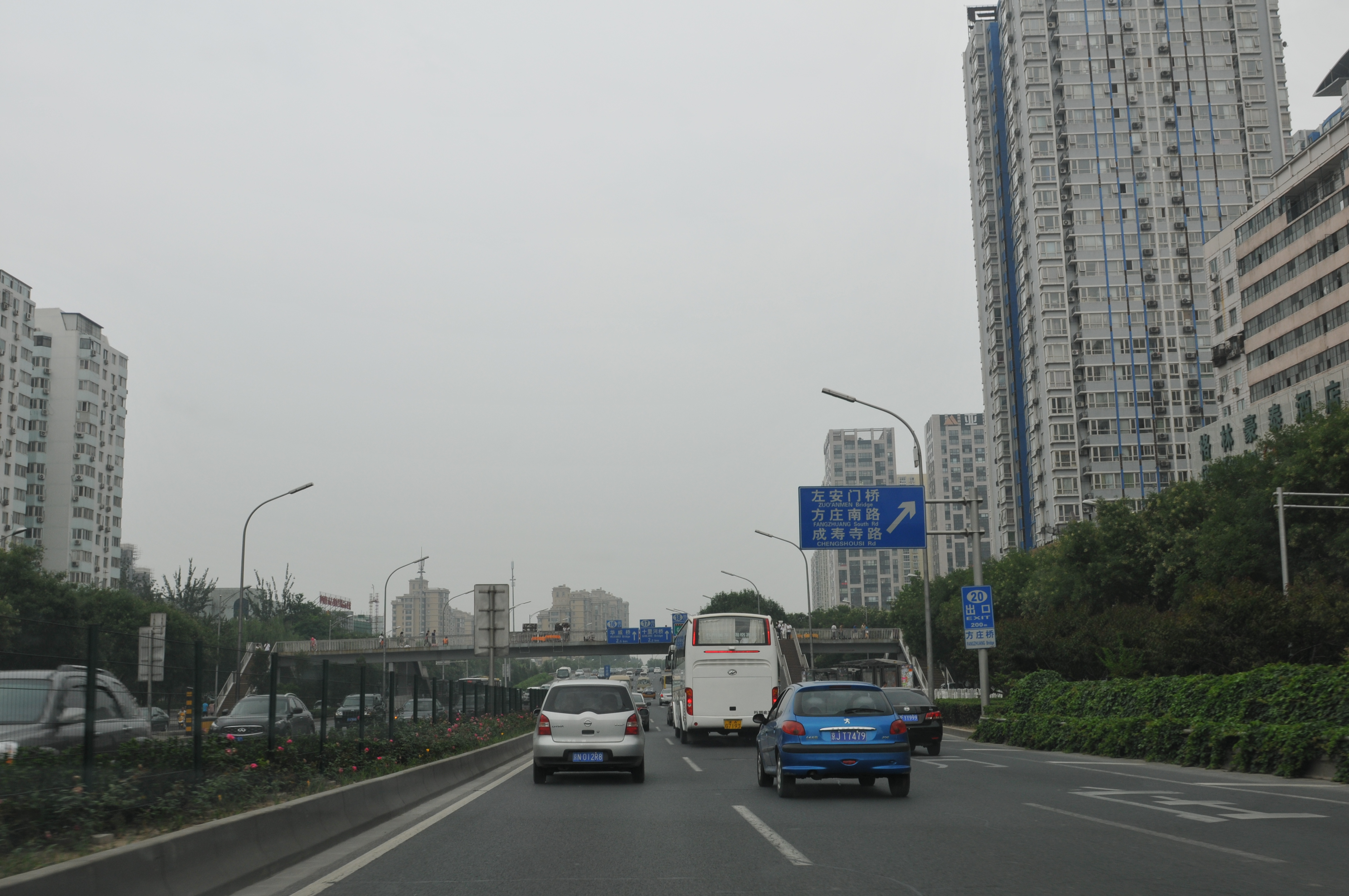
Nansanhuan East Road, the northern border of Chengshousi Subdistrict, 2011

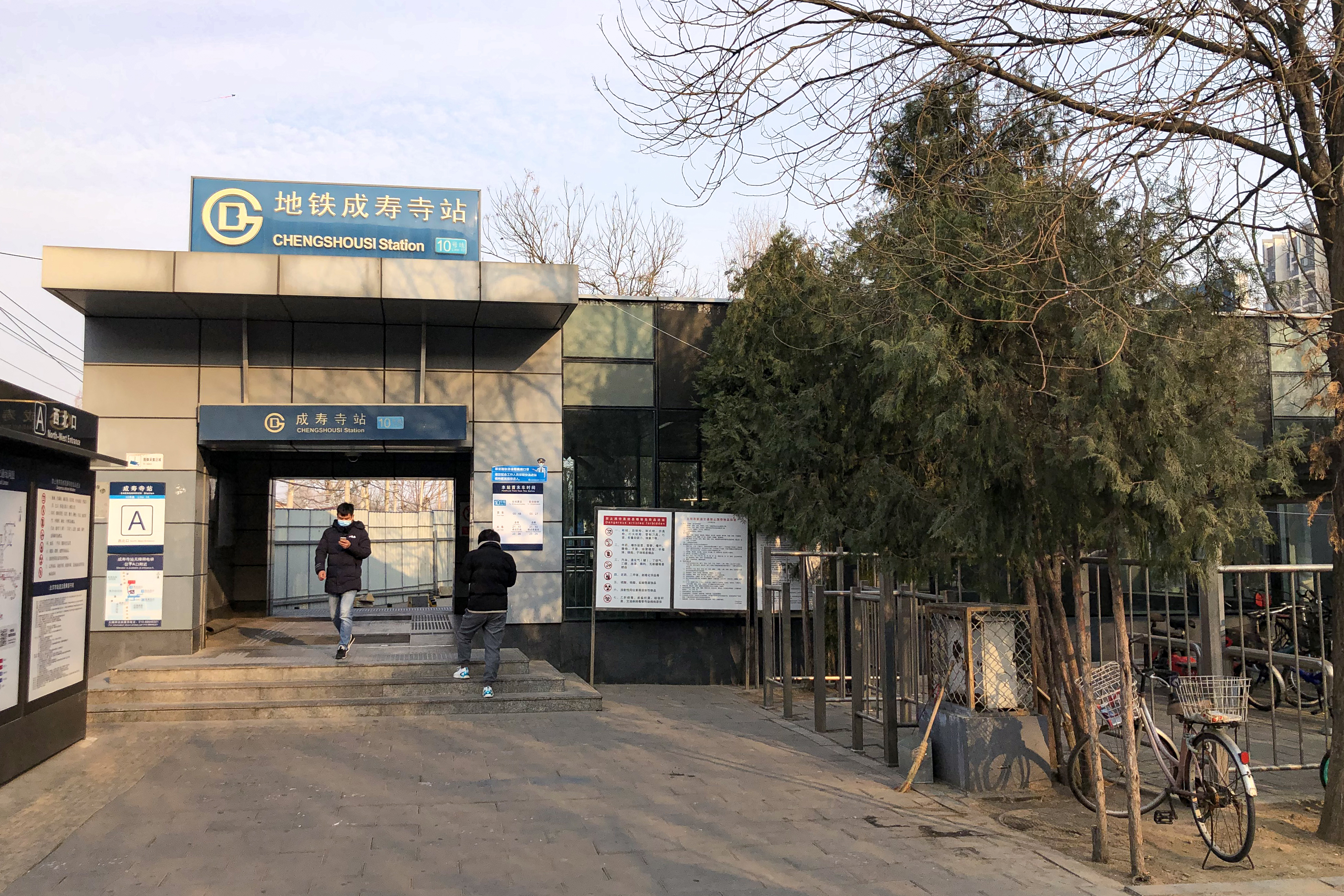
Chengshousi Station of Beijing Subway, 2021

== See also ==
- List of township-level divisions of Beijing
