= Liuliqiao Subdistrict =

Liuliqiao Subdistrict 六里桥街道
- Subdistrict
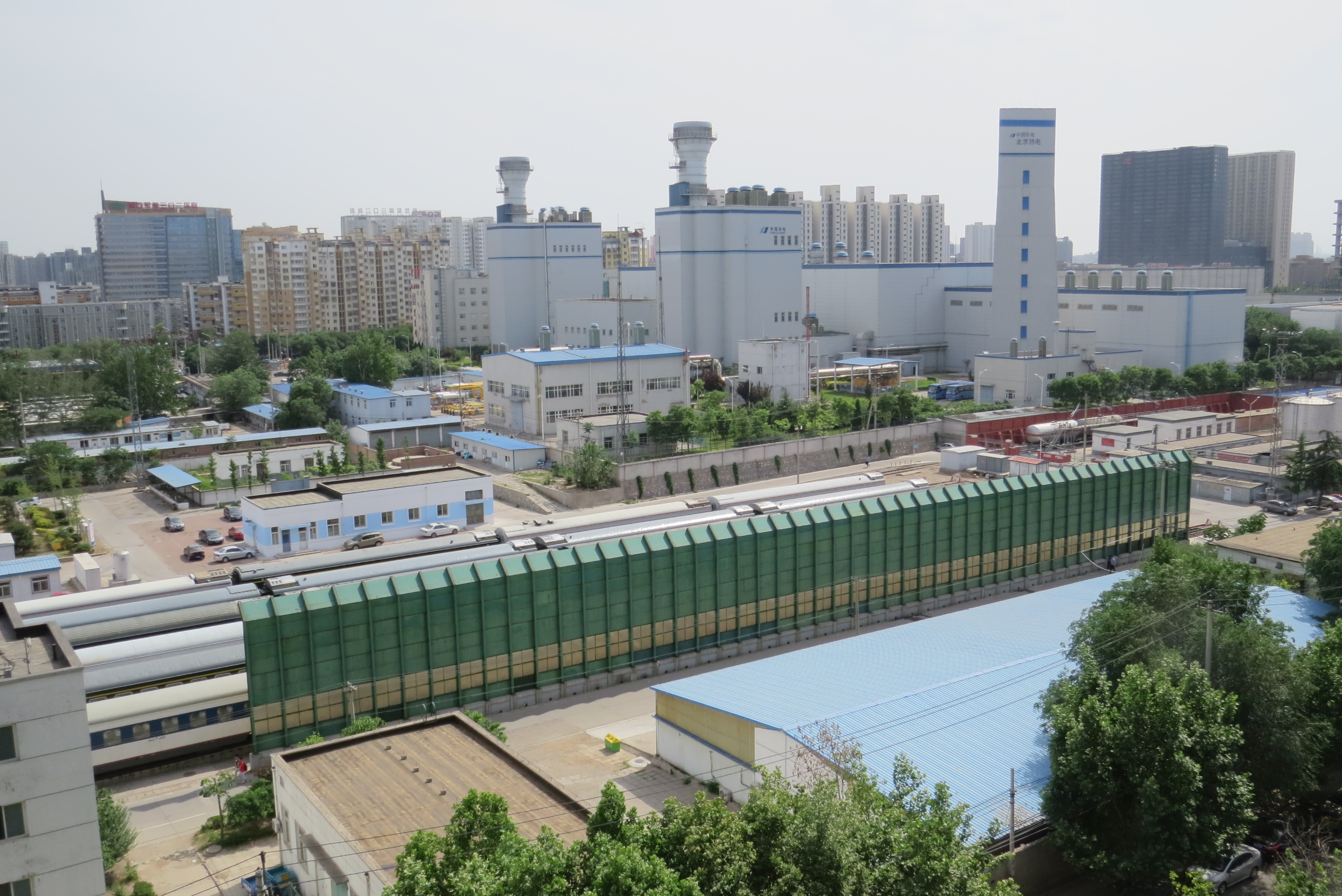
- Stock depot owned by China Railway Beijing Group on the north of the subdistrict, 2015

- Location within Beijing Location within China
- Coordinates: 39°52′11″N 116°16′31″E
- Country: China
- Municipality: Beijing
- District: Fengtai
- Village-level Divisions: 16 communities 3 village

Area
  - Total: 9.88 km^{2} (3.81 sq mi)

Population (2020)
  - Total: 223,304
  - Density: 22,600/km^{2} (58,500/sq mi)
- Time zone: UTC+8 (China Standard)
- Postal code: 100161
- Area code: 010

Liuliqiao Subdistrict (Chinese: 六里桥街道; pinyin: Liùlǐqiáo Jiēdào), formerly known as Lugouqiao Subdistrict (Chinese: 卢沟桥街道; pinyin: Lúgōuqiáo Jiēdào), is one of the 14 subdistricts of Fengtai District, Beijing, China. It is situated on the north of Fengtai, south of Wanshoulu Subdistrict and Yangfangdian Subdistrict, west of Taipingqiao Subdistrict, north of Fengtai Subdistrict, east of Babaoshan Subdistrict, and is contained by Lugouqiao Subdistrict (formerly Lugouqiao Township). Liuliqiao has a population of 223,304 as of the 2020 census.

The subdistrict was previously known as Lugouqiao (Chinese: 卢沟桥; lit. 'Lu Ditch Bridge'), which was the native Chinese name of Marco Polo Bridge. On July 11, 2021, its name was changed to Liuliqiao (Chinese: 六里桥; lit. 'Six Miles Bridge'), while the Lugouqiao Township was converted to Lugouqiao Subdistrict.

== History ==
Timeline of Liuliqiao Subdistrict
Year	Status
1953	Established as Lugouqiao Township
1960	Incorporated Xiaotun and Yuegezhuang Townships
1958	Transformed into a subdistrict
1984	Created Lugouqiao Rural Bureau within the subdistrict
2021	Renamed to Liuliqiao and the borders are redrawn

== Administrative division ==
As of 2023, Liuliqiao Subdistrict comprises 19 subdivisions, including 16 communities and 3 villages:

Administrative Division Code	Community Names	Name Transliteration	Type
110106008001	丰台路口	Fengtai Lukou	Community
110106008002	望园	Wangyuan	Community
110106008003	六里桥南里	Liuliqiao Nanli	Community
110106008004	六里桥北里	Liuliqiao Beili	Community
110106008005	八一厂	Bayichang	Community
110106008006	六里桥	Liuliqiao	Community
110106008007	莲怡园	Lianyiyuan	Community
110106008008	莲香园	Lianxiangyuan	Community
110106008010	金家村第一	Jinjiacun Diyi	Community
110106008011	金家村第二	Jinjiacun Di'er	Community
110106008028	京铁家园	Jingtie Jiayuan	Community
110106008033	保利益丰	Baoli Yifeng	Community
110106008034	科兴佳园	Kexing Jiayuan	Community
110106008044	西局欣园	Xiju Xinyuan	Community
110106008045	西局玉园	Xiju Yuyuan	Community
110106008046	玉璞家园	Yupujiayuan	Community
110106008200	靛厂	Dianchang	Village
110106008201	小井	Xiaojing	Village
110106008202	六里桥	Liuliqiao	Village

== See also ==
- List of township-level divisions of Beijing
