= Dongtiejiangying Subdistrict =

Dongtiejiangying Subdistrict 东铁匠营街道
- Subdistrict
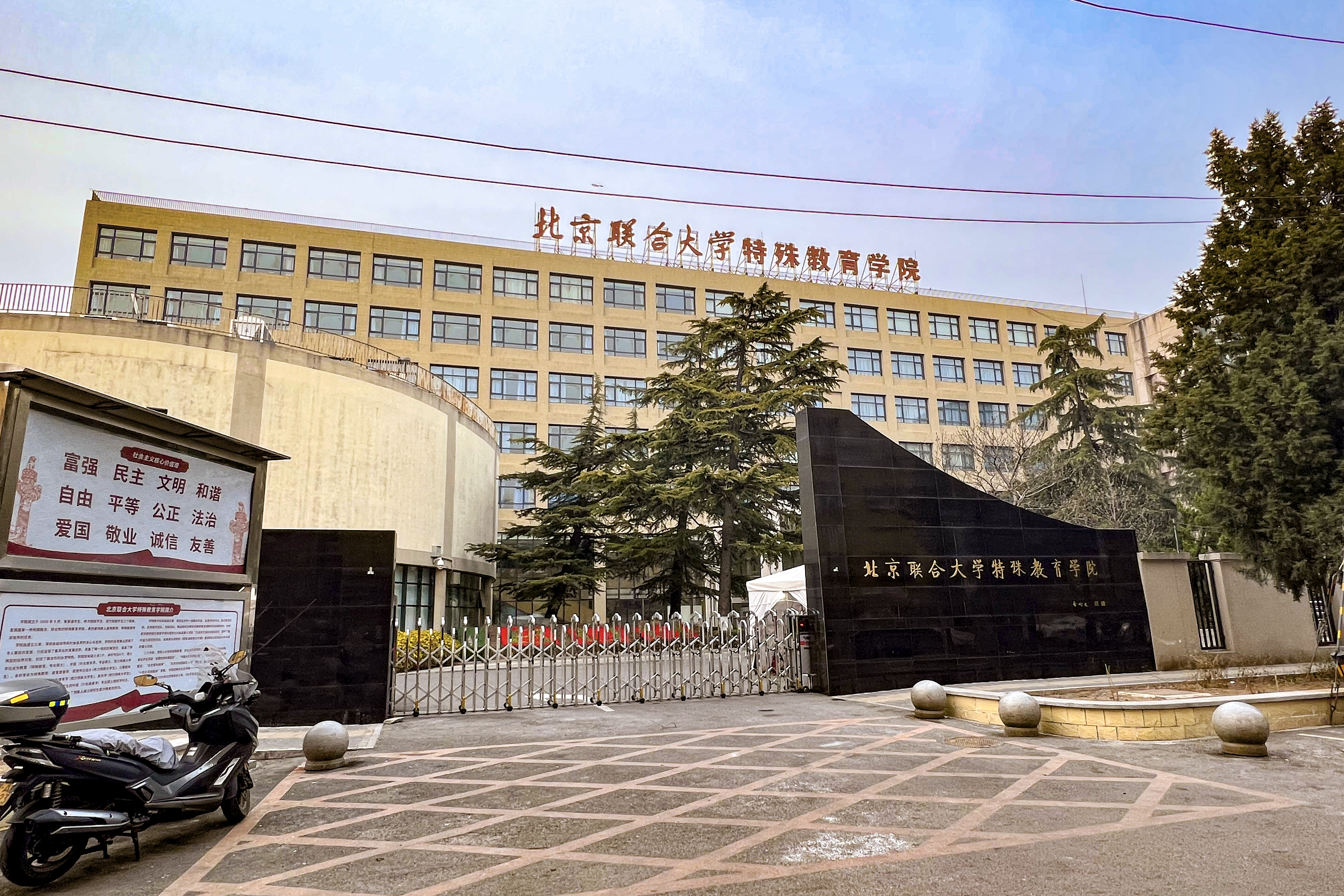
- Special Education College of Beijing Union University, 2022

- Location within Beijing Location within China
- Coordinates: 39°51′29″N 116°24′29″E
- Country: China
- Municipality: Beijing
- District: Fengtai
- Village-level Divisions: 22 communities 1 village

Area
  - Total: 5.28 km^{2} (2.04 sq mi)

Population (2020)
  - Total: 152,873
  - Density: 29,000/km^{2} (75,000/sq mi)
- Time zone: UTC+8 (China Standard)
- Postal code: 100075
- Area code: 010

Dongtiejiangying Subdistrict (Chinese: 东铁匠营街道; pinyin: Dōngtiějiàngyíng Jiēdào) is a subdistrict on the eastern end of Fengtai District, Beijing, China. It borders Yongdingmenwai Subdistrict and Fangzhuang Township to the north, Nanyuan and Xiaohongmen Townships to the east, Nanyuan Township and Dahongmen Subdistrict to the south, Xiluoyuan and Yongdingmenwai Subdistricts to the west. It has a census population of 152,873 as of 2020.

The name Dongtiejiangying (Chinese: 东铁匠营; lit. 'East Blacksmith Barrack') is derived from its past status as one of the six blacksmith barracks during the Ming and Qing dynasty.

== History ==
Timeline of Dongtiejiangying Subdistrict
Year	Status
1912	Paer of the 3rd Suburban District
1949	Part of the 15th District and later 14th District
1950	Part of the 11th District
1952	Part of the Nanyuan District
1954	3 Townships (Dongtiejiangying, Zuoanmen and Puhuangyu) merged to form Dongtiejiang Subdistrict
1958	Transferred under People's Commune of Nanyuan Township
1960	Separated from Nanyuan and became its own commune
1966	Restored as Dongtiejiangying Subdistrict
1985	The following communities and villages were transferred to Fangzhuang Township: Balihe Dongli; Balihe Xili; Balihe Beili; Hucun
2010	Guangcai Diyi Community was transferred to Dahongmen Subdistrict

== Administrative Division ==
At the end of 2021, Dongtiejiangying Subdistrict is divided into 23 subdivisions, with 22 communities and 1 villages:

Administrative Division Code	Community Names	Name Transliteration	Type
110106007001	蒲黄榆第一	Puhuangyu Diyi	Community
110106007002	蒲黄榆第二	Puhuangyu Di'er	Community
110106007003	蒲黄榆第三	Puhuangyu Disan	Community
110106007004	蒲安里第一	Pu'anli Diyi	Community
110106007005	蒲安里第二	Pu'anli Di'er	Community
110106007006	刘家窑第一	Liujiayao Diyi	Community
110106007007	刘家窑第二	Liujiayao Di'er	Community
110106007008	刘家窑第三	Liujiayao Disan	Community
110106007009	木樨园第一	Muxiyuan Diyi	Community
110106007010	木樨园第二	Muxiyuan Di'er	Community
110106007012	同仁园	Tongrenyuan	Community
110106007013	横七条路第一	Hengqitiaolu Diyi	Community
110106007014	横七条路第二	Hengqitiaolu Di'er	Community
110106007015	横七条路第三	Hengqitiaolu Disan	Community
110106007016	宋庄路第一	Songzhuanglu Diyi	Community
110106007017	宋庄路第二	Songzhuanglu Di'er	Community
110106007020	南方庄	Nanfangzhuang	Community
110106007029	宋庄路第三	Songzhuanglu Disan	Community
110106007030	东木樨园	Dongmuxiyuan	Community
110106007031	定安东里	Ding'andongli	Community
110106007032	贾家花园	Jiajiahuayuan	Community
110106007033	嘉顺园	Jiashunyuan	Community
110106007200	东铁匠营	Dongtiejiangying	Village

== See also ==
- List of township-level divisions of Beijing
