= Fengtai, Beijing =

District in China

Fengtai 丰台区
- District
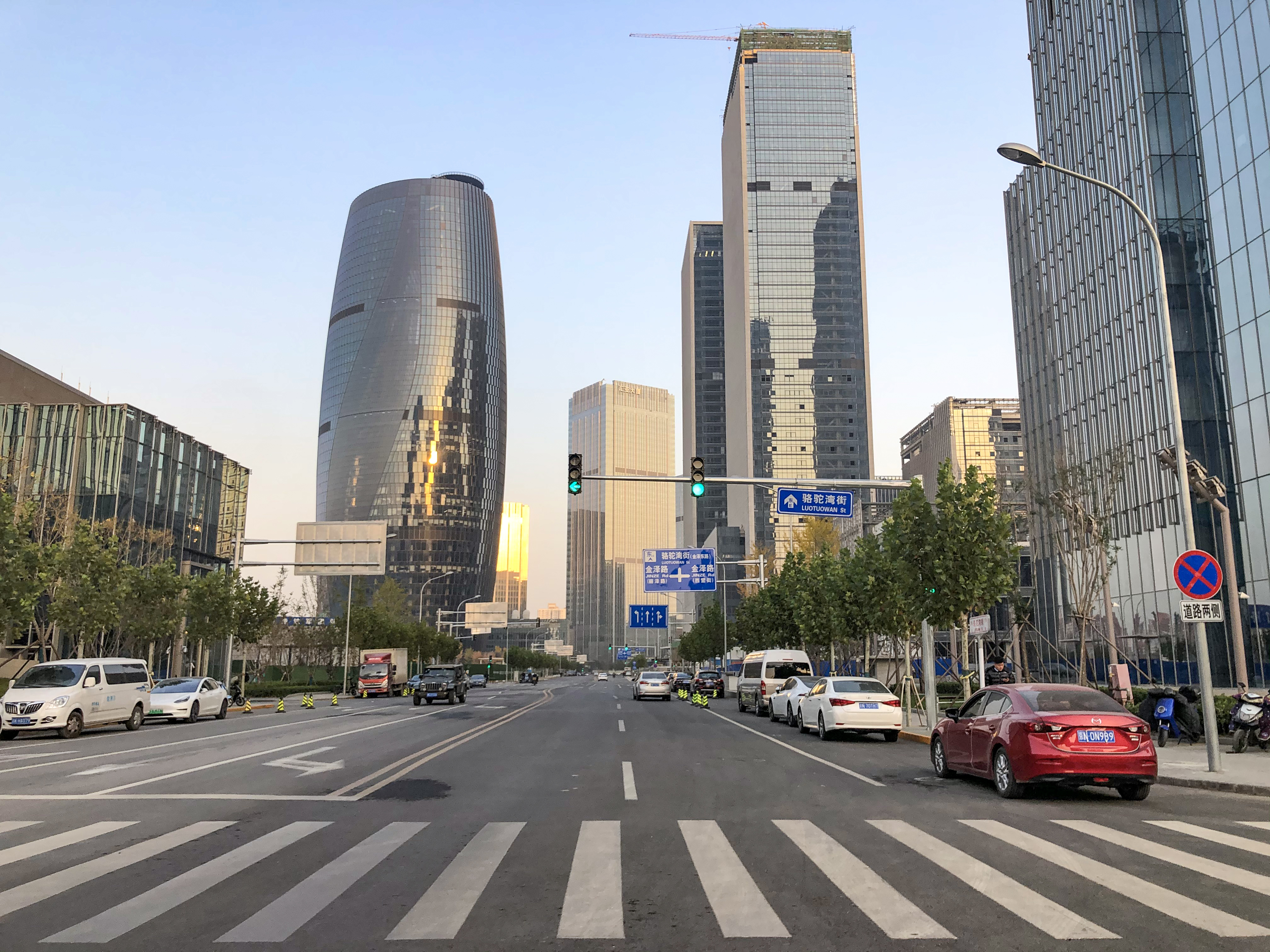
- Lize Business District

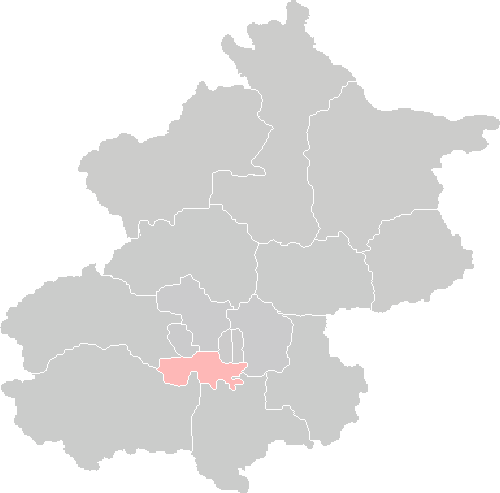
- Location of Fengtai District in Beijing
- Interactive map of Fengtai
- Coordinates (Fengtai government): 39°51′31″N 116°17′12″E
- Country: People's Republic of China
- Municipality: Beijing
- Township-level divisions: 25 subdistricts; 2 towns

Area
  - Total: 306 km^{2} (118 sq mi)

Population (2020)
  - Total: 2,019,764
  - Density: 6,600/km^{2} (17,100/sq mi)
- Time zone: UTC+8 (China Standard)
- Postal code: 100071
- Area code: 0010
- Website: www.bjft.gov.cn

Fengtai District (Chinese: 丰台区; pinyin: Fēngtái Qū) is a district of the city of Beijing. It lies mostly to the southwest of the city center, extending into the city's southwestern suburbs beyond the Sixth Ring Road, but also to the south and, to a smaller extent, the southeast, where it has borders with Chaoyang and Dongcheng.

== History ==
The Western Han dynasty Prince Liu Jian and his wife were buried in Dabaotai village in southwestern Fengtai over 2,000 years ago. The tombs were discovered in 1974 and are now open to visitors at the Dabaotai Western Han Dynasty Mausoleum on Fengbo Road.

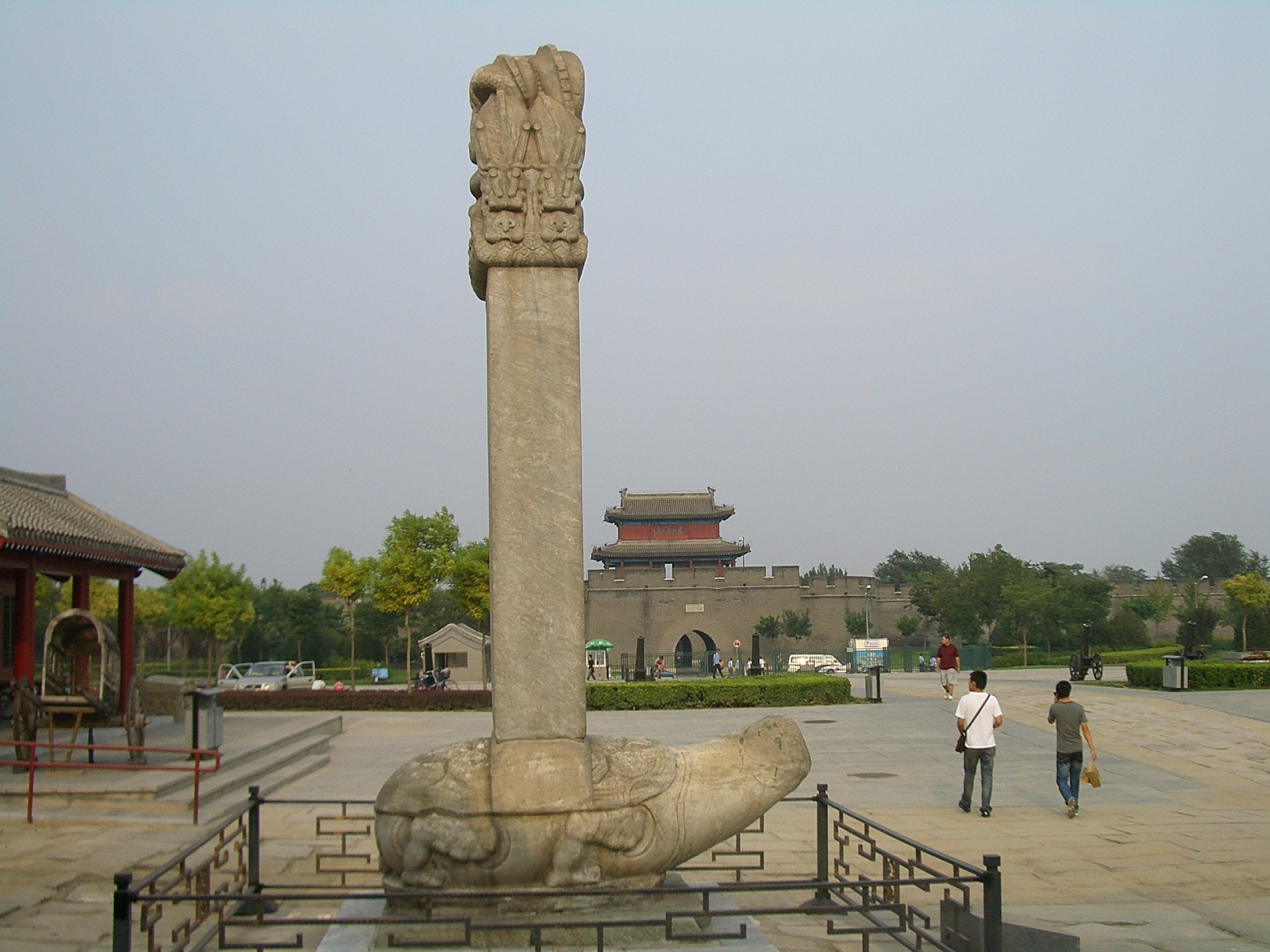
The western gate of Wanping Fortress, seen from the plaza at the entrance to Marco Polo Bridge - historically, the only bridge connecting the two halves of today's Fengtai District. The stele in memory of Kangxi Emperor's repairs to the bridge, held by a bixi tortoise, is in the foreground

In Qing Dynasty times, Fengtai was where the Imperial Manchu Army had its camps, trained, and held parades on festive occasions.

It is 304.2 square kilometers (117.5 sq mi) in area, making it the third-largest precinct in the greater urban part of Beijing, and is home to over 2 million inhabitants.

It is divided into 14 subdistricts of the city proper of Beijing, 2 towns, and 5 townships (2 of which are suburbs of the city proper of Beijing). This precinct is newly urbanized in comparison to those precincts in the old city, and until the mid-1980s, it was still a mostly rural area where pig pens and goat pens were common, and major parts of the precinct had no electricity. It was only during the recent rapid economic development that the precinct was urbanized. Its postal code is 100071.

== Administrative divisions ==
As of 2025, the district administers 24 subdistricts and 2 towns:

Name	Chinese (S)	Hanyu Pinyin
Fengtai Subdistrict	丰台街道	Fēngtái Jiēdào
You'anmen Subdistrict	右安门街道	Yòu'ānmén Jiēdào
Taipingqiao Subdistrict	太平桥街道	Tàipíngqiáo Jiēdào
Xiluoyuan Subdistrict	西罗园街道	Xīluōyuán Jiēdào
Dahongmen Subdistrict	大红门街道	Dàhóngmén Jiēdào
Nanyuan Subdistrict	南苑街道	Nányuàn Jiēdào
Donggaodi Subdistrict	东高地街道	Dōnggāodì Jiēdào
Dongtiejiangying Subdistrict	东铁匠营街道	Dōngtiějiàngyíng Jiēdào
Liuliqiao Subdistrict	六里桥街道	Liùlǐqiáo Jiēdào
Xincun Subdistrict	新村街道	Xīncūn Jiēdào
Changxindian Subdistrict	长辛店街道	Chángxīndiàn Jiēdào
Yungang Subdistrict	云岗街道	Yúngǎng Jiēdào
Majiapu Subdistrict	马家堡街道	Mǎjiāpù Jiēdào
Heyi Subdistrict	和义街道	Héyì Jiēdào
Fangzhuang Subdistrict	方庄街道	Fāngzhuāng Jiēdào
Wanping Subdistrict	宛平城街道	Wǎnpíngchéng Jiēdào
Lugouqiao Subdistrict	卢沟桥街道	Lúgōuqiáo Jiēdào
Huaxiang Subdistrict	花乡街道	Huāxiāng Jiēdào
Chengshousi Subdistrict	成寿寺街道	Chéngshòusì Jiēdào
Shiliuzhuang Subdistrict	石榴庄街道	Shíliúzhuāng Jiēdào
Yuquanying Subdistrict	玉泉营街道	Yùquányíng Jiēdào
Kandan Subdistrict	看丹街道	Kàndān Jiēdào
Wulidian Subdistrict	五里店街道	Wǔlǐdiàn Jiēdào
Qingta Subdistrict	青塔街道	Qīngtǎ Jiēdào
Beigong town	北宫镇	Běigōng Zhèn
Wangzuo town	王佐镇	Wángzuǒ Zhèn

== Notable communities ==
- Zhejiangcun

== Transportation ==
The southwestern stretches of the 2nd, 3rd, 4th, 5th and 6th Ring Roads all run through the district, as well as the Jingshi Expressway (Jingzhu Expressway).

=== Railway stations ===
Beijing West railway station and Beijing South railway station are both located in the northeastern part of Fengtai, near its border with Xicheng District. Beijing Fengtai railway station opened in 2022.

=== Metro ===
Fengtai is currently served by thirteen metro lines of the Beijing Subway:

- Line 4 - Beijing South railway station 14 , Majiapu, Jiaomen West 10 , Gongyixiqiao Daxing
- Line 5 - Puhuangyu 14 , Liujiayao, Songjiazhuang 10 Yizhuang
- Line 7 - Beijing West railway station 9
- Line 8 - Haihutun, Dahongmen South, Heyi, Donggaodi, Huojianwanyuan
- Line 9 - Beijing West railway station 7 , Liuliqiao East, Liuliqiao 10 , Qilizhuang 14 , Fengtai Dongdajie, Fengtainanlu 16 , Keyilu, Fengtai Science Park, Guogongzhuang Fangshan
- Line 10 - Fenzhongsi, Songjiazhuang 5 Yizhuang , Shiliuzhuang, Dahongmen, Jiaomen East, Jiaomen West 4 , Caoqiao 19 Daxing Airport , Jijiamiao, Shoujingmao Fangshan , Fengtai railway station 16 , Niwa, Xiju 14 , Liuliqiao 9
- Line 14 - Zhangguozhuang, Garden Expo Park, Dawayao, Guozhuangzi, Dajing, Qilizhuang 9 , Xiju 10 , Dongguantou, Lize Shangwuqu 16 , Caihuying, Xitieying, Jingfengmen 19 , Beijing South railway station 4 , Puhuangyu 5 , Fangzhuang
- Line 16 - Dongguantounan Fangshan , Lize Shangwuqu 14 , Fengtai railway station 10 , Fengtai Nanlu 9 , Fufengqiao, Kandan, Yushuzhuang, Hongtaizhuang, Wanpingcheng
- Line 19 - Jingfengmen 14 , Caoqiao 10 Daxing Airport , Xinfadi, Xingong Daxing
- Daxing line - Gongyixiqiao 4 , Xingong 19
- Fangshan line - Dongguantounan 16 , Shoujingmao 10 , Huaxiang Dongqiao, Baipenyao, Guogongzhuang 9 , Dabaotai
- Yizhuang line - Songjiazhuang 5 10
- Daxing Airport Express - Caoqiao 10 19

== Tourism ==
- Beijing World Park
- White Cloud Temple
- Marco Polo Bridge
- Wanping Fortress, at the eastern end of the bridge
- Museum of the War of Chinese People's Resistance Against Japanese Aggression, inside the fortress

== Economy ==
In 2017, the regional GDP of the district is 142.75 billion yuan, with GDP per capita at 65.3 thousand yuan.

China United Airlines previously had its headquarters in Fengtai District. Okay Airways previously had its headquarters in Fengtai District.

== Education ==
Capital Medical University and Capital University of Economics and Business are located in this district, as is Minzu University of China's secondary campus.

== Climate ==
Fengtai has a humid continental climate (Köppen climate classification Dwa). The average annual temperature in Fengtai is 13.2 °C (55.8 °F). The average annual rainfall is 547.1 mm (21.54 in) with July as the wettest month. The temperatures are highest on average in July, at around 27.2 °C (81.0 °F), and lowest in January, at around −2.9 °C (26.8 °F).

Climate data for Fengtai District, elevation 55 m (180 ft), (1991–2020 normals, extremes 1961–present)
Month	Jan	Feb	Mar	Apr	May	Jun	Jul	Aug	Sep	Oct	Nov	Dec	Year
Record high °C (°F)	14.7 (58.5)	25.6 (78.1)	29.3 (84.7)	33.9 (93.0)	41.1 (106.0)	41.2 (106.2)	42.2 (108.0)	39.1 (102.4)	38.1 (100.6)	31.6 (88.9)	23.1 (73.6)	18.7 (65.7)	42.2 (108.0)
Mean daily maximum °C (°F)	2.7 (36.9)	6.5 (43.7)	13.4 (56.1)	21.3 (70.3)	27.5 (81.5)	31.0 (87.8)	32.0 (89.6)	31.0 (87.8)	26.7 (80.1)	19.5 (67.1)	10.6 (51.1)	4.0 (39.2)	18.8 (65.9)
Daily mean °C (°F)	−2.9 (26.8)	0.6 (33.1)	7.5 (45.5)	15.3 (59.5)	21.5 (70.7)	25.3 (77.5)	27.2 (81.0)	26.0 (78.8)	21.0 (69.8)	13.5 (56.3)	4.9 (40.8)	−1.2 (29.8)	13.2 (55.8)
Mean daily minimum °C (°F)	−7.4 (18.7)	−4.5 (23.9)	1.7 (35.1)	8.7 (47.7)	14.7 (58.5)	19.7 (67.5)	22.6 (72.7)	21.6 (70.9)	15.8 (60.4)	8.0 (46.4)	0.1 (32.2)	−5.6 (21.9)	8.0 (46.3)
Record low °C (°F)	−20.0 (−4.0)	−21.7 (−7.1)	−13.9 (7.0)	−4.4 (24.1)	2.7 (36.9)	9.1 (48.4)	14.5 (58.1)	12.9 (55.2)	3.2 (37.8)	−4.3 (24.3)	−13.4 (7.9)	−18.0 (−0.4)	−21.7 (−7.1)
Average precipitation mm (inches)	1.8 (0.07)	5.7 (0.22)	8.6 (0.34)	21.1 (0.83)	34.1 (1.34)	84.5 (3.33)	183.6 (7.23)	113.5 (4.47)	52.9 (2.08)	26.2 (1.03)	13.1 (0.52)	2.0 (0.08)	547.1 (21.54)
Average precipitation days (≥ 0.1 mm)	1.5	2.3	2.7	4.6	6.2	10.3	12.7	10.6	7.2	4.9	3.1	1.5	67.6
Average snowy days	2.7	2.2	1.0	0.1	0	0	0	0	0	0	1.7	2.4	10.1
Average relative humidity (%)	44	42	40	43	48	59	71	72	66	62	56	47	54
Mean monthly sunshine hours	174.5	175.9	217.9	237.1	259.2	209.3	178.5	192.6	195.4	187.4	158.6	161.4	2,347.8
Percentage possible sunshine	58	58	59	59	58	47	40	46	53	55	54	56	54
Source: China Meteorological Administration
