= Fengtai Subdistrict =

Fengtai Subdistrict 丰台街道
- Subdistrict
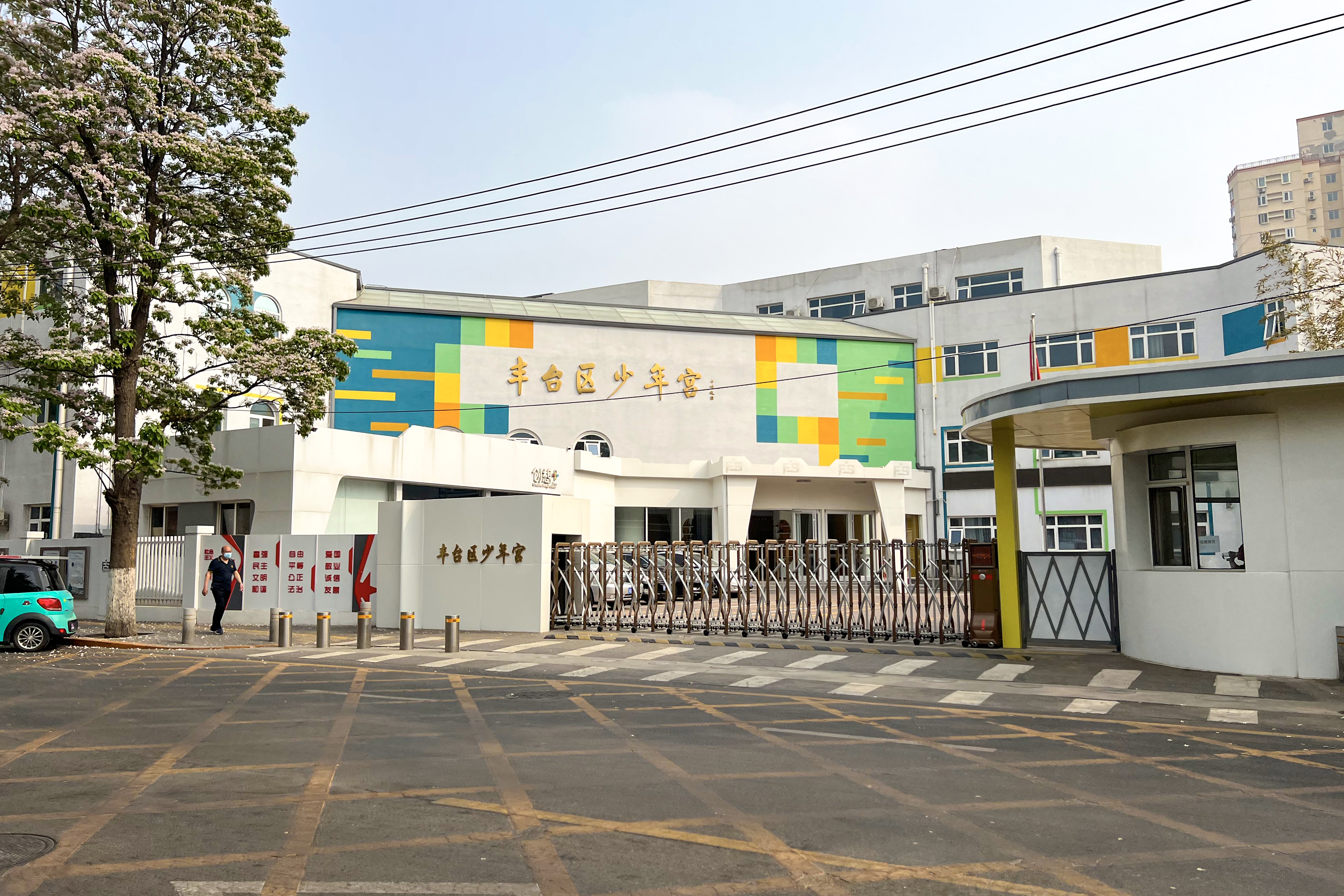
- Fengtai Children's Palace, 2022

- Location within Beijing Location within China
- Coordinates: 39°50′53″N 116°16′52″E
- Country: China
- Municipality: Beijing
- District: Fengtai
- Village-level Divisions: 17 communities 1 village

Area
  - Total: 8.9 km^{2} (3.4 sq mi)

Population (2020)
  - Total: 137,290
  - Density: 15,000/km^{2} (40,000/sq mi)
- Time zone: UTC+8 (China Standard)
- Postal code: 100161
- Area code: 010

Fengtai Subdistrict (Chinese: 丰台街道; pinyin: Fēngtái Jiēdào) is a subdistrict of Fengtai District, Beijing, China. It borders Lugouqiao Township to the northeast, Xincun Subdistrict to the soueast, Huaxiang Township to the southwest, and Lugouqiao Subdistrict to the northwest. As of the 2020 Chinese National Census, the entire area of Fengtai subdistrict had a population of 137,290.

The name Fengtai (Chinese: 丰台; lit. 'Abundance Platform') was inherited from the subdistrict's predecessor Fengtai Town.

== History ==
History of Fengtai Subdistrict
Time	Status
Ming dynasty	Then known as Fengtai (风台) Village, Part of Wanping County
1911	Part of Special Administrative Region of Wanping County
1949	Established as Fengtai Town
1954	Changed to Fengtai Town Bureau
1990	Converted to a subdistrict

== Administrative Division ==
In 2021, Fengtai Subdistrict comprises 18 subdivisions, 17 of which are communities:

Administrative Division Code	Community Names	Name Transliteration	Type
110106009008	北大街北里	Beidajie Beili	Community
110106009009	东大街西里	Dongdajie Xili	Community
110106009010	北大街	Beidajie	Community
110106009011	东幸福街	Dong Xingfujie	Community
110106009012	永善	Yongshan	Community
110106009013	正阳北里	Zhengyang Beili	Community
110106009014	东大街东里	Dongdajie Dongli	Community
110106009015	东大街	Dongdajie	Community
110106009016	前泥洼	Qianniwa	Community
110106009018	向阳	Xiangyang	Community
110106009019	建国街	Jianguojie	Community
110106009020	新华街北	Xinhuajie Bei	Community
110106009021	新华街南	Xinhuajie Nan	Community
110106009023	丰益花园	Fengyi Huayuan	Community
110106009024	丰管路	Fengguanlu	Community
110106009027	游泳场北路	Youyongchang Beilu	Community
110106009028	丽泽景园	Lize Jingyuan	Community
110106009200	周庄子	Zhouzhuangzi	Village

== See also ==
- List of township-level divisions of Beijing
