= Xiju station =

Beijing Subway station

Coordinates: 39.86677°N 116.303819°E

Xiju 西局
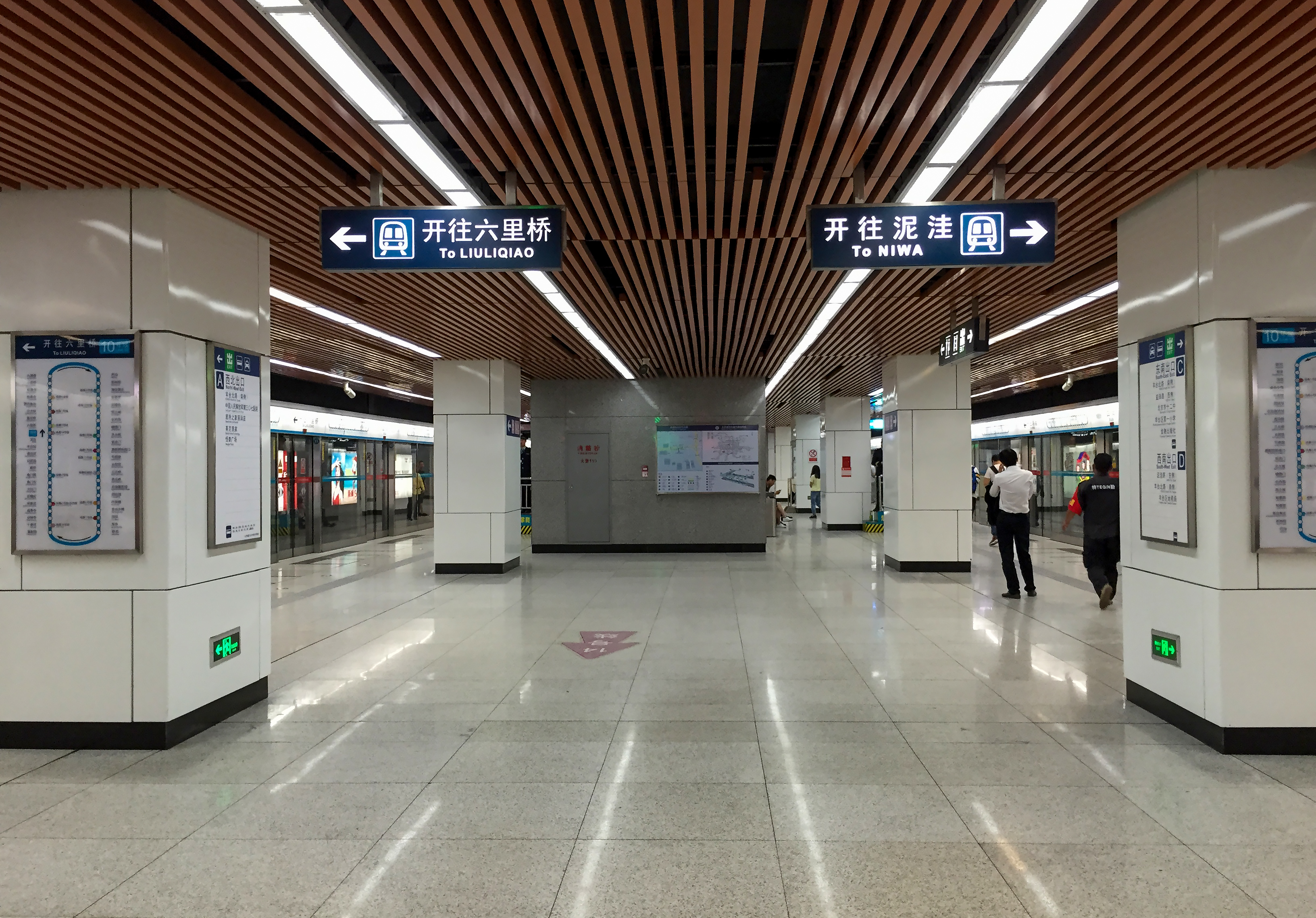
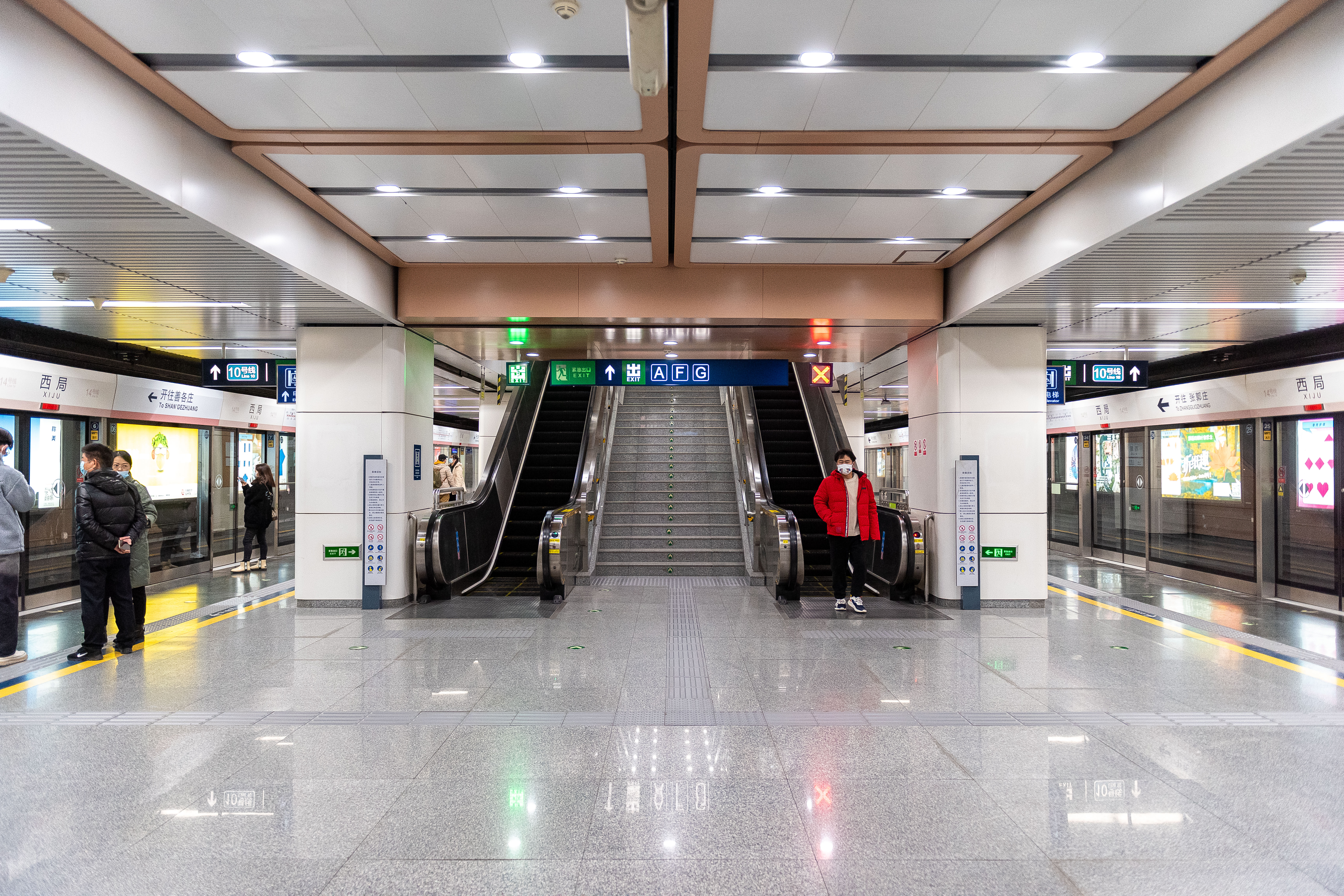
- Line 10 platform Line 14 platform

General information
- Location: Fengtai North Road (丰台北路) and Xiju West Road (西局西路); Fengtai District, Beijing; China
- Operator: Beijing Mass Transit Railway Operation Corporation Limited (Line 10); Beijing MTR Corporation Limited (Line 14)
- Lines: Line 10; Line 14
- Platforms: 4 (2 island platforms)
- Tracks: 4

Construction
- Structure type: Underground
- Accessible: Yes

History
- Opened: December 30, 2012; 13 years ago (Line 10); May 5, 2013; 13 years ago (Line 14)

Services
| Preceding station | Beijing Subway | Following station |
|---|---|---|
| Niwa outer loop / anticlockwise | Line 10 | Liuliqiao inner loop / clockwise |
| Qilizhuang towards Zhangguozhuang | Line 14 | Dongguantou towards Shangezhuang |
Location
- Location within Beijing

Xiju station (Chinese: 西局站; pinyin: Xījú Zhàn) is a station on Line 10 and Line 14 of the Beijing Subway. It opened on December 30, 2012. Line 14 service began on May 5, 2013, and Xiju serves as the eastern terminus of Line 14's western section until December 31, 2021, when the remaining section of Line 14 from Xiju to Beijing South Railway Station opened that day.

== Station layout ==
Both the line 10 and line 14 stations have underground island platforms.

== Exits ==
There are 6 exits, lettered A, B, C, E, F, and G. Exits A, C, E, and F are accessible.

== Gallery ==
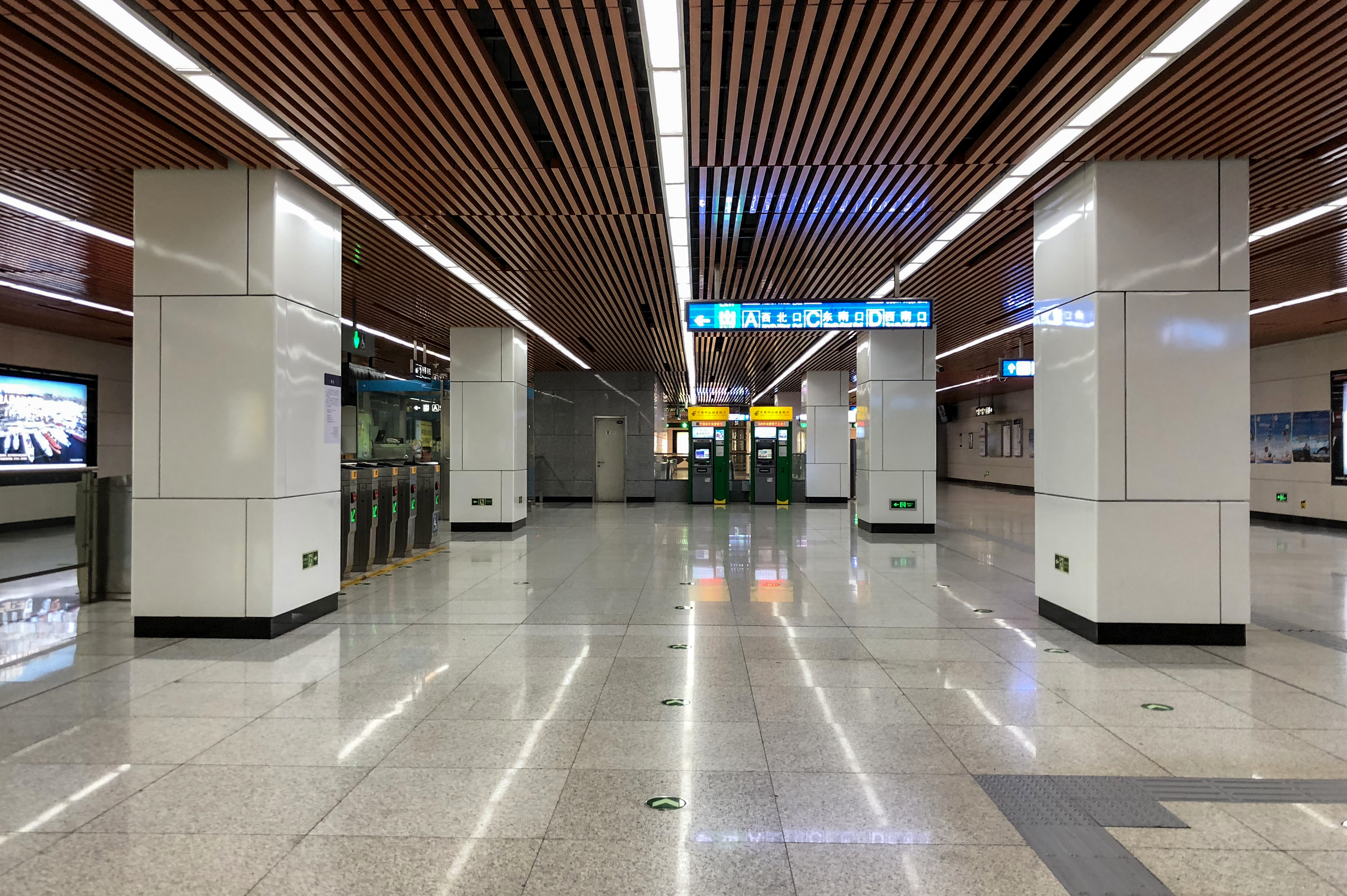
Line 10 concourse

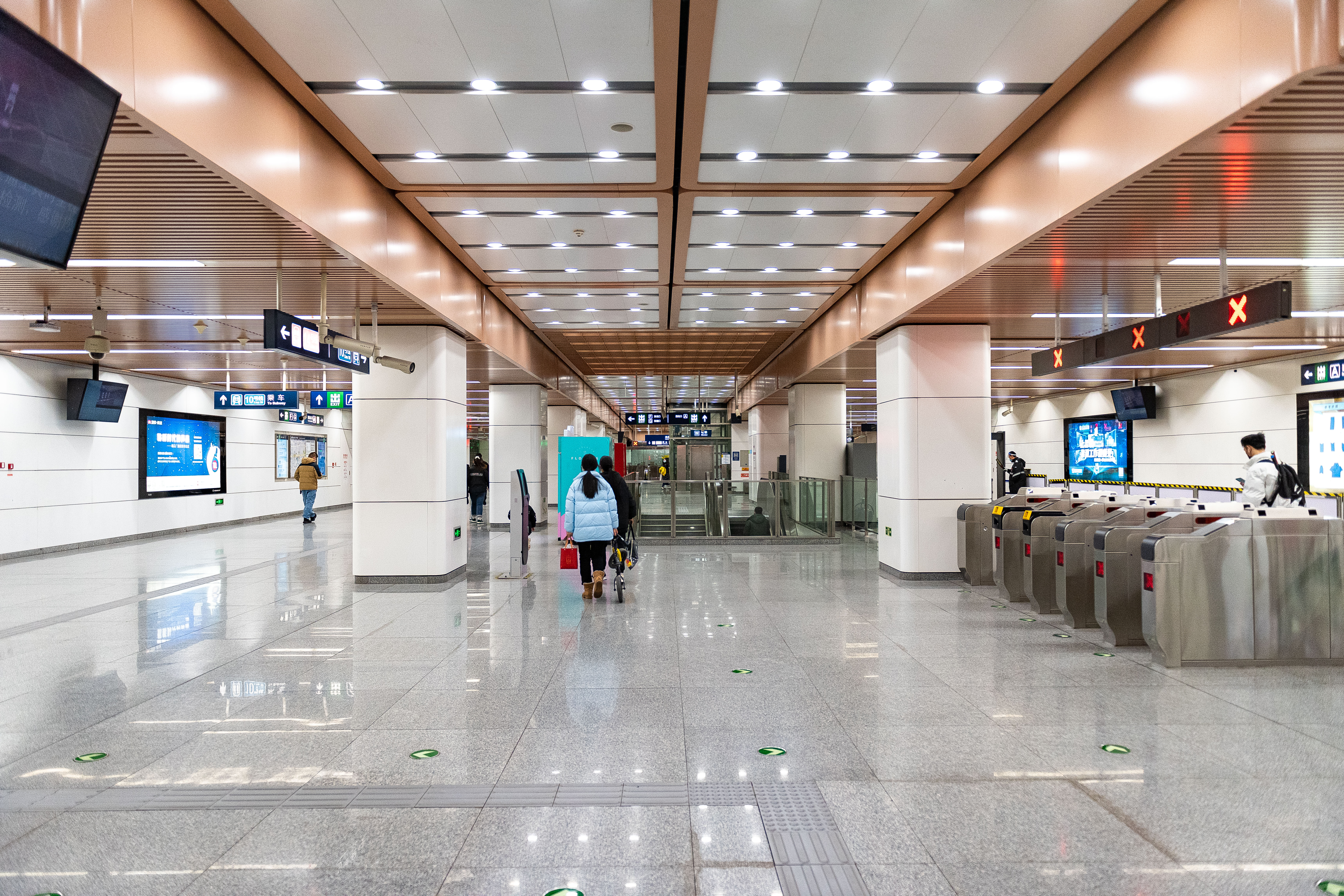
Line 14 concourse
