= Pingle Yuan station =

Beijing Subway station

Pingle Yuan 平乐园
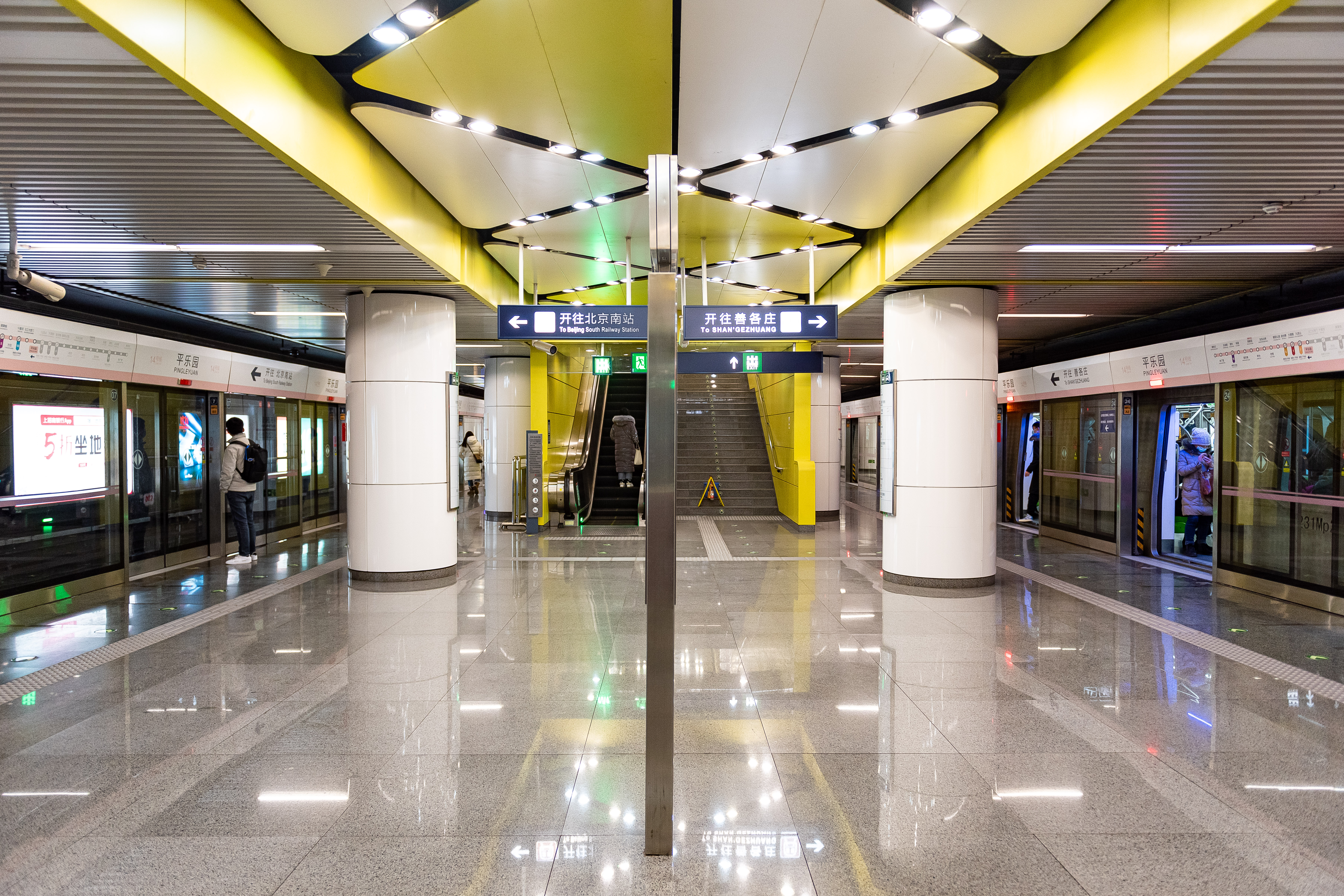
- Platform

General information
- Location: Xidawang Road (西大望路) and Nanmofang Road (南磨房路); Chaoyang District, Beijing; China
- Coordinates: 39°53′07″N 116°28′38″E
- Operator: Beijing MTR Corporation Limited
- Line: Line 14
- Platforms: 2 (1 island platform)
- Tracks: 2

Construction
- Structure type: Underground
- Accessible: Yes

History
- Opened: December 30, 2017; 8 years ago

Services
| Preceding station | Beijing Subway | Following station |
|---|---|---|
| Beijing Univ. of Tech. West Gate towards Zhangguozhuang | Line 14 | Jiulongshan towards Shangezhuang |
Location
- Location within Beijing

Pingle Yuan Station (simplified Chinese: 平乐园站; traditional Chinese: 平樂園站; pinyin: Pínglè Yuán Zhàn) is a station on Line 14 of the Beijing Subway. It was opened on December 30, 2017.

== Station layout ==
The station has an underground island platform.

== Exits ==
There are 3 exits, lettered B, C, and D. Exit B is accessible.
