= Jintai Lu station =

Beijing Subway interchange station

Jintai Lu 金台路
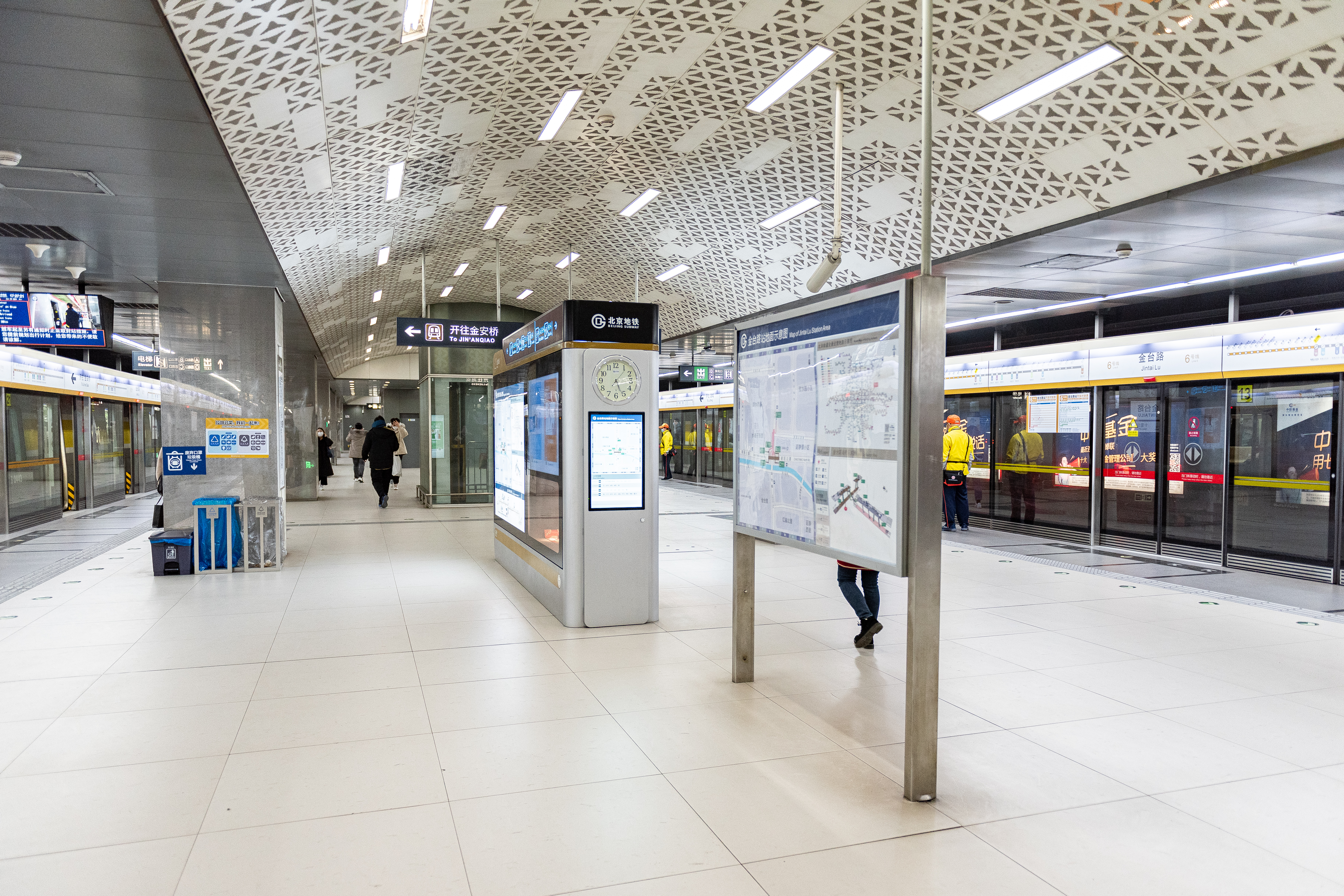
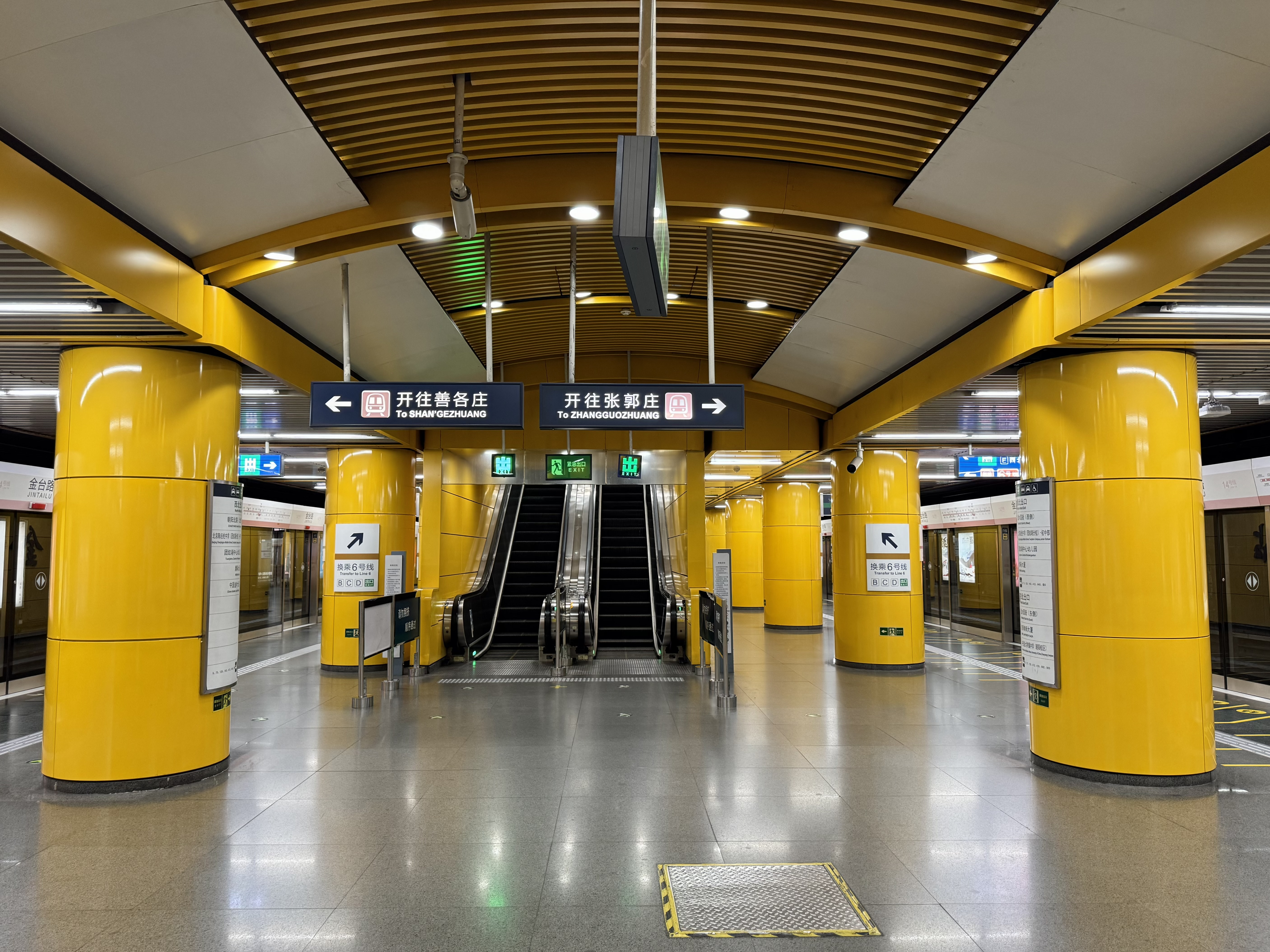
- Line 6 platform Line 14 platform

General information
- Location: Tianshuiyuan Street (甜水园街) / Jintai Road (金台路) and North Chaoyang Road (朝阳北路); Chaoyang District, Beijing; China
- Coordinates: 39.9229°N 116.4781°E
- Operator: Beijing Mass Transit Railway Operation Corporation Limited (line 6); Beijing MTR Corporation Limited (line 14)
- Lines: Line 6; Line 14
- Platforms: 4 (2 island platforms)
- Tracks: 4

Construction
- Structure type: Underground
- Accessible: Yes

History
- Opened: December 30, 2012; 13 years ago (Line 6); December 28, 2014; 11 years ago (Line 14)

Services
| Preceding station | Beijing Subway | Following station |
|---|---|---|
| Hujialou towards Jin'anqiao | Line 6 | Shilipu towards Luyang |
| Dawang Lu towards Zhangguozhuang | Line 14 | Chaoyang Park towards Shangezhuang |
Location
- Location within Beijing

Jintai Lu (Chinese: 金台路站; pinyin: Jīntáilù Zhàn) is an interchange station between Line 6 and Line 14 of the Beijing Subway. It is located in Chaoyang District. This station opened on December 30, 2012. It was the western teminus of Line 14 until it was extended westward to Beijing South railway station on December 26, 2015.

== Station layout ==
Both the line 6 and 14 stations have underground island platforms.

== Exits ==
There are 6 exits, lettered A, B, C, D, E, and F. Exits C and E are accessible.

== Gallery ==
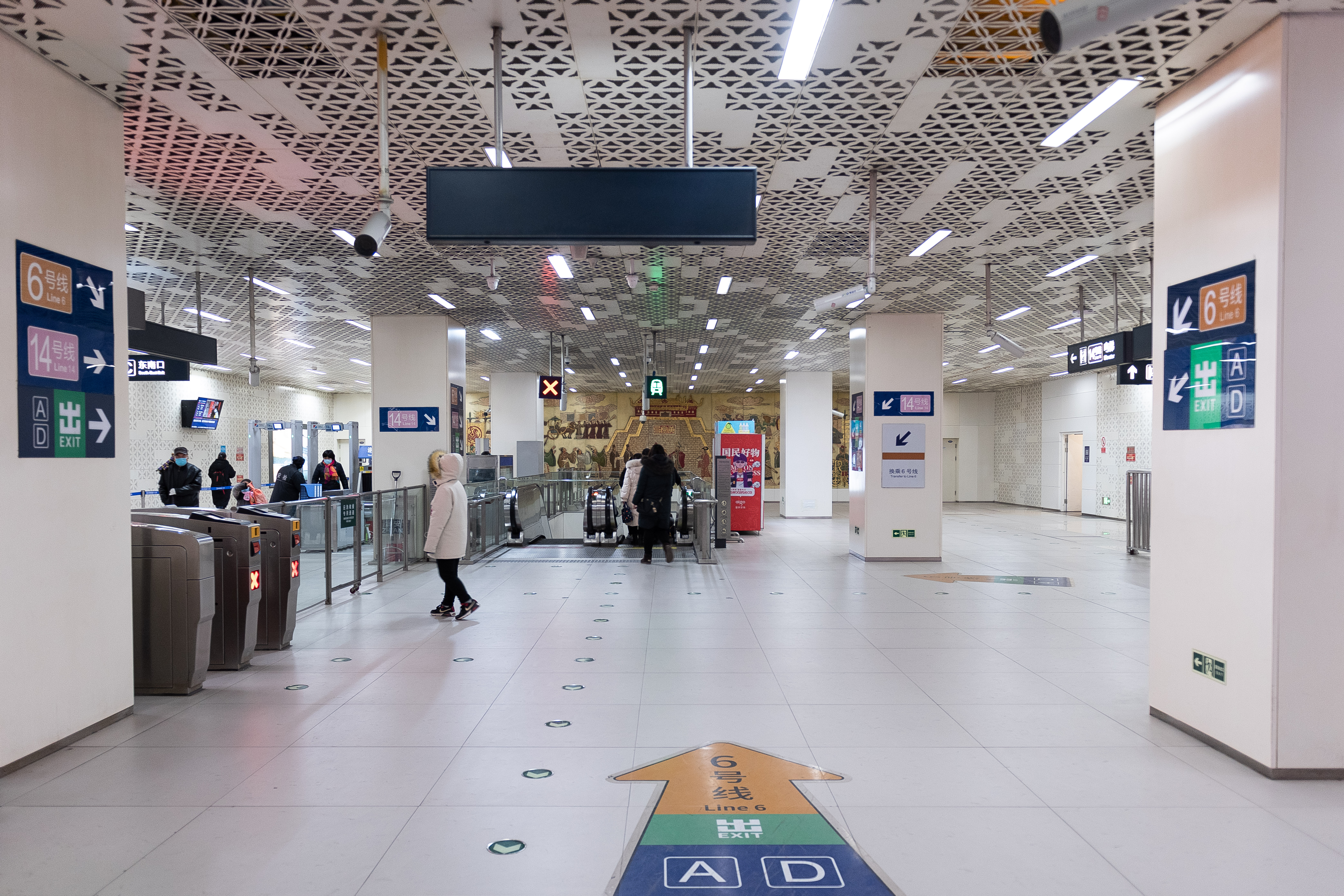
Line 6 east concourse

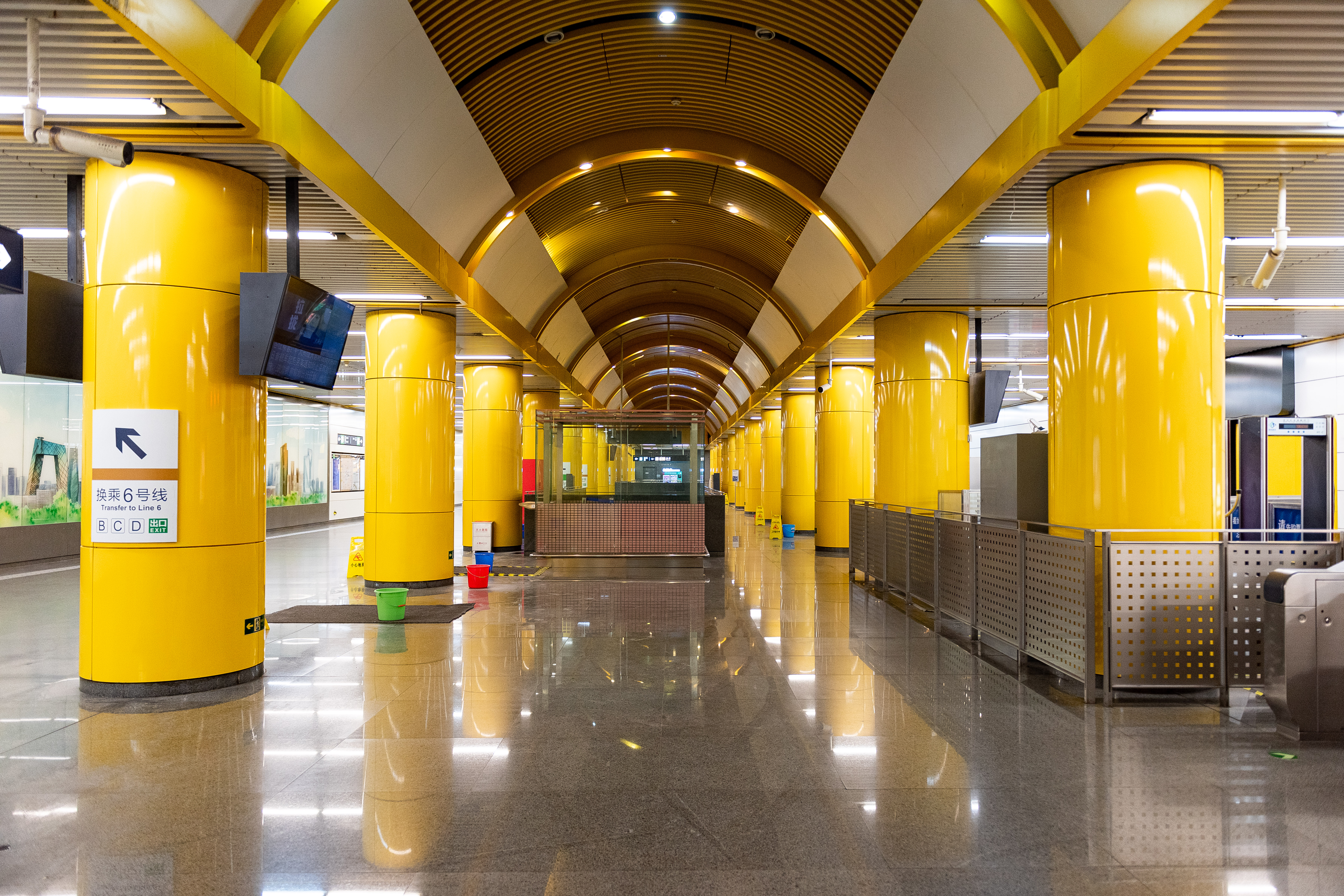
Line 14 concourse
