= Beijing Univ. of Tech West Gate station =

Beijing Subway station

Beijing Univ. of Tech. West Gate 北工大西门
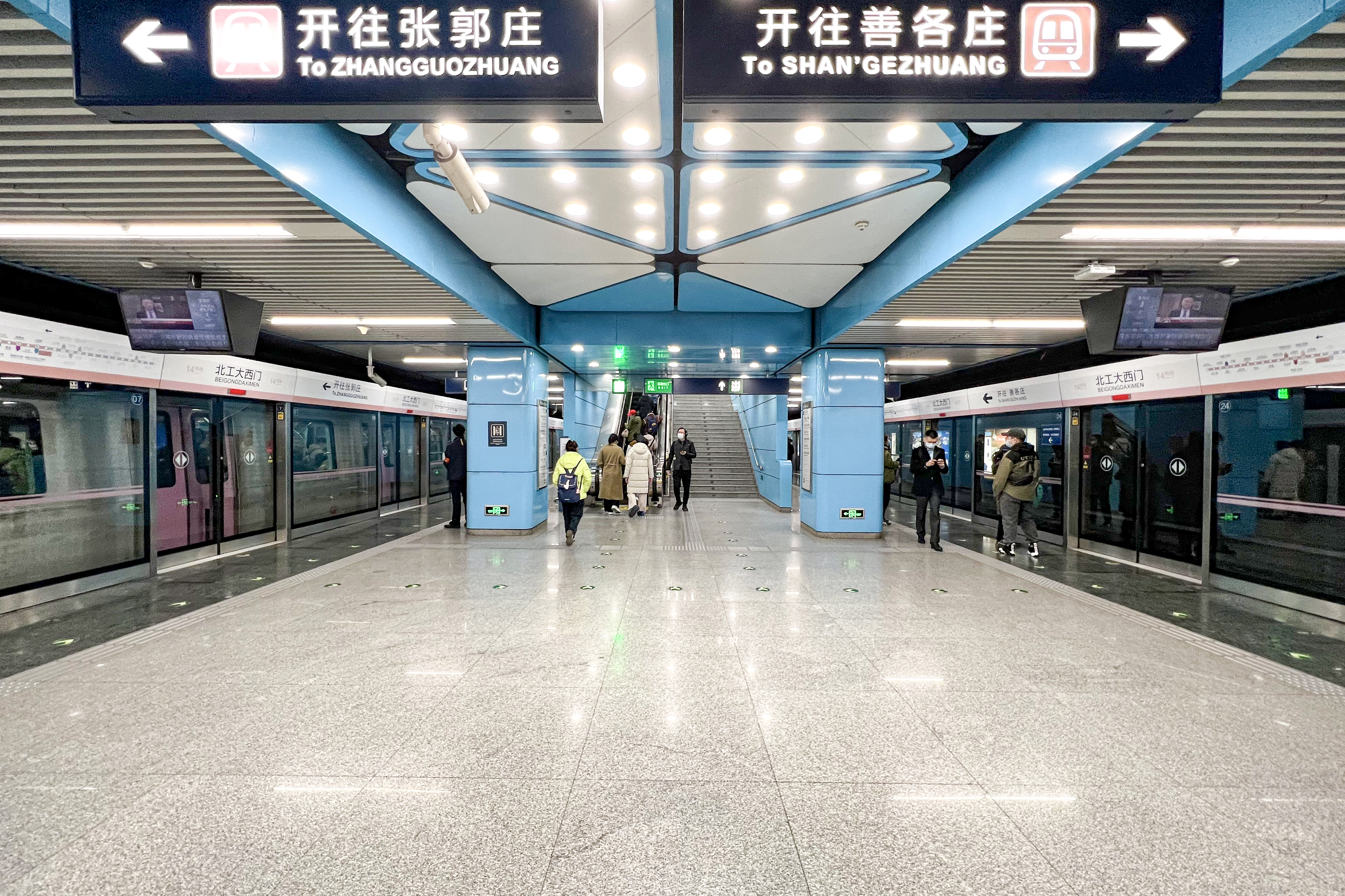
- Station platform in 2022

General information
- Location: Xidawang Road (西大望路) and Songyu North Road (松榆北路); Chaoyang District, Beijing; China
- Coordinates: 39°52′32″N 116°28′38″E
- Operator: Beijing MTR Corporation Limited
- Line: Line 14
- Platforms: 2 (1 island platform)
- Tracks: 2

Construction
- Structure type: Underground
- Accessible: Yes

History
- Opened: December 26, 2015; 10 years ago

Services
Preceding station	Beijing Subway	Following station
Shilihe towards Zhangguozhuang	Line 14	Pingle Yuan towards Shangezhuang
Location
- Location within Beijing

Beijing Univ. of Tech. West Gate station (simplified Chinese: 北工大西门站; traditional Chinese: 北工大西門站; pinyin: Běigōngdà Xīmén zhàn) is a station on Line 14 of the Beijing Subway. It was opened on December 26, 2015.

== Station layout ==
The station has an underground island platform.

== Exits ==
There are 3 exits, lettered A, C, and D. Exit C is accessible.

== Gallery ==
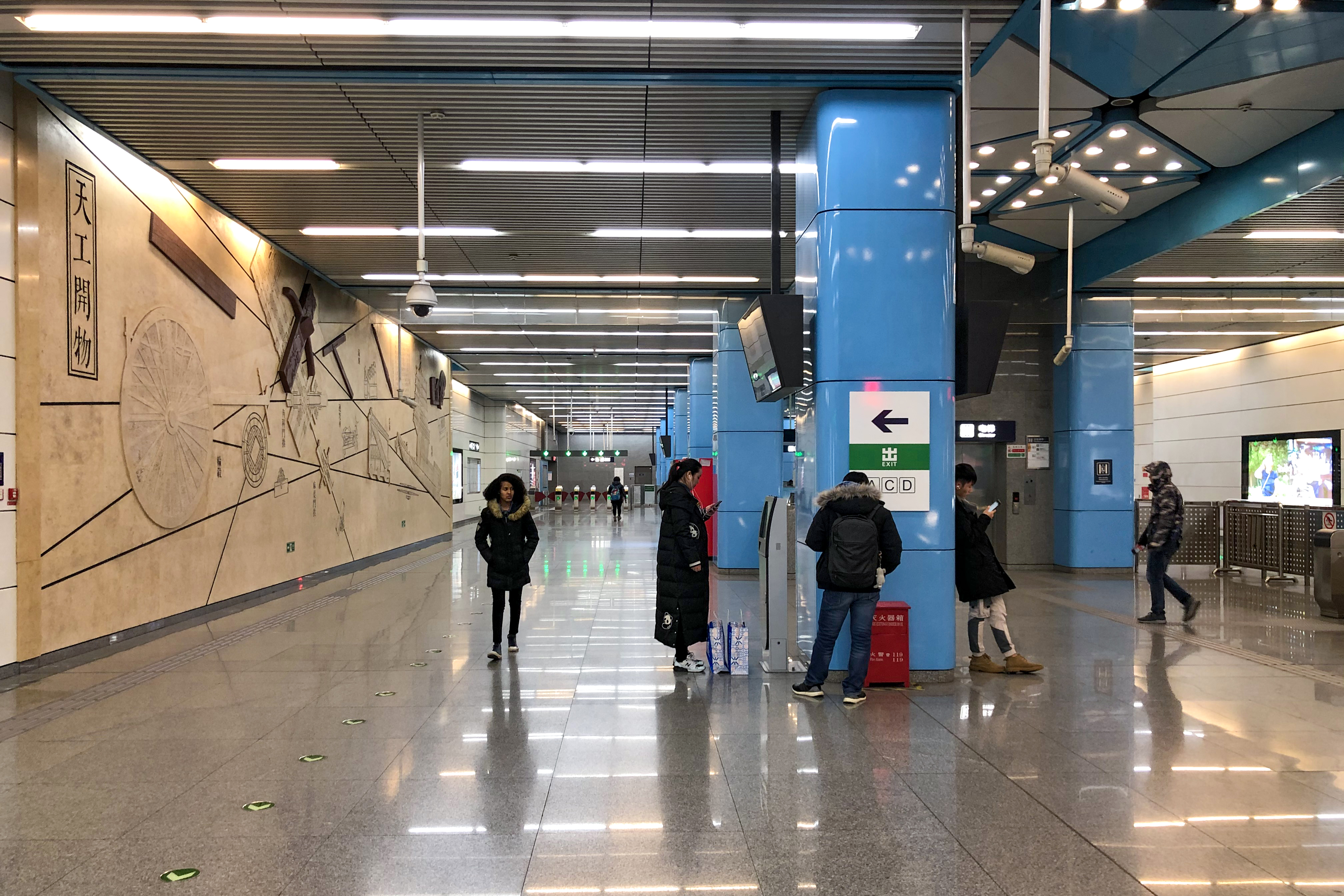
Station concourse

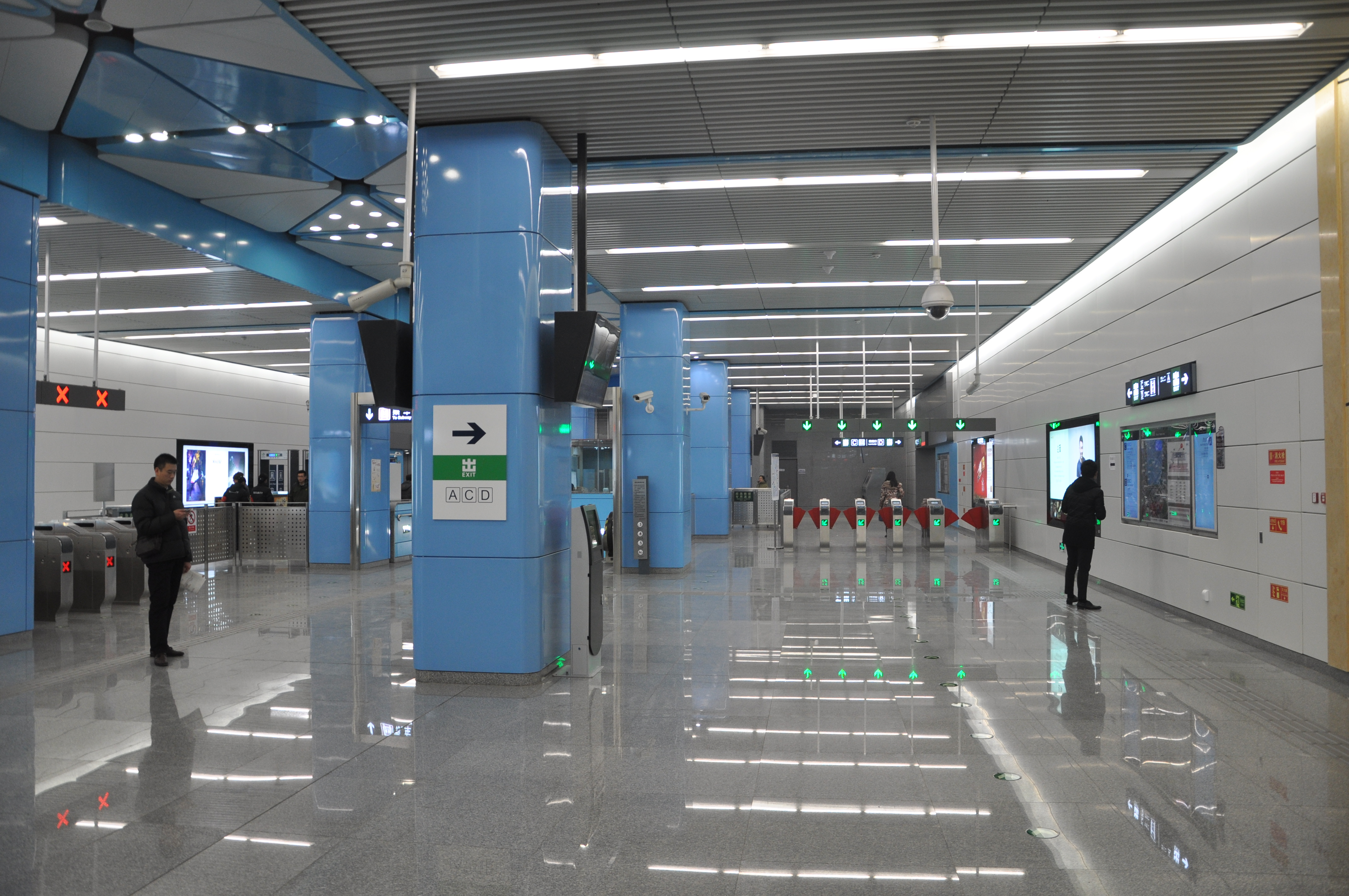
Station concourse with faregates in the background

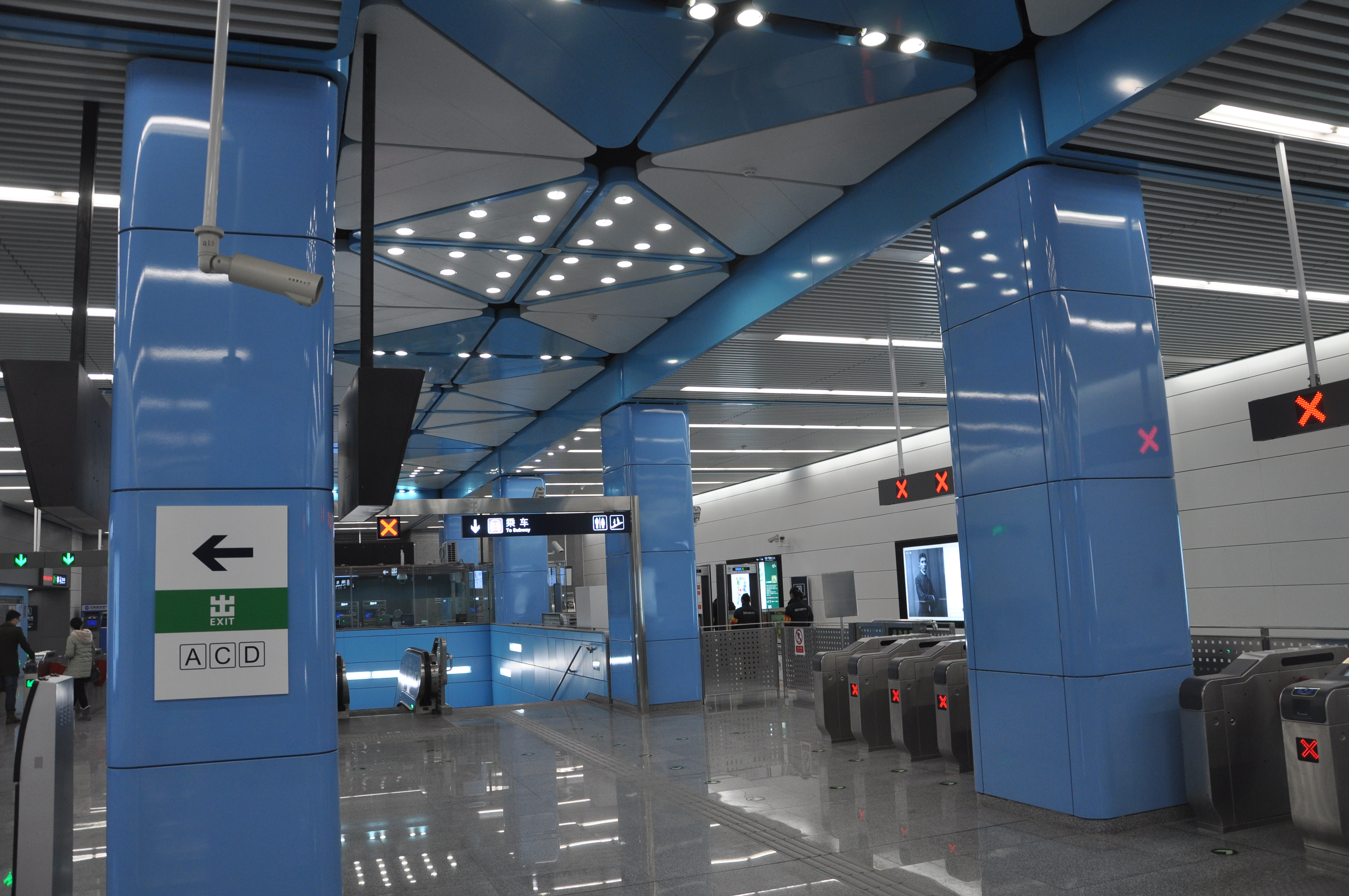
Station concourse with escalator and steps to platforms in the background

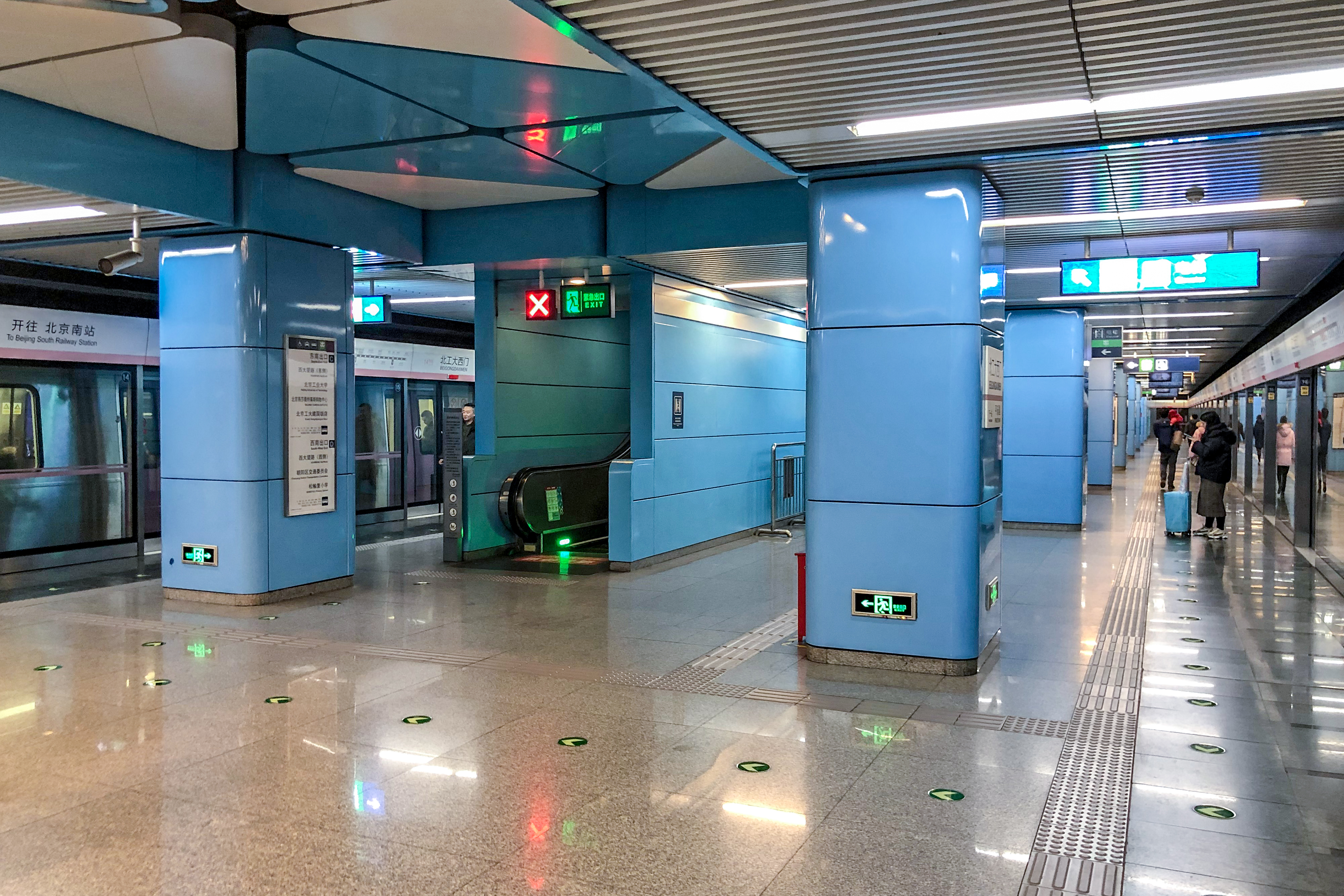
Station platform

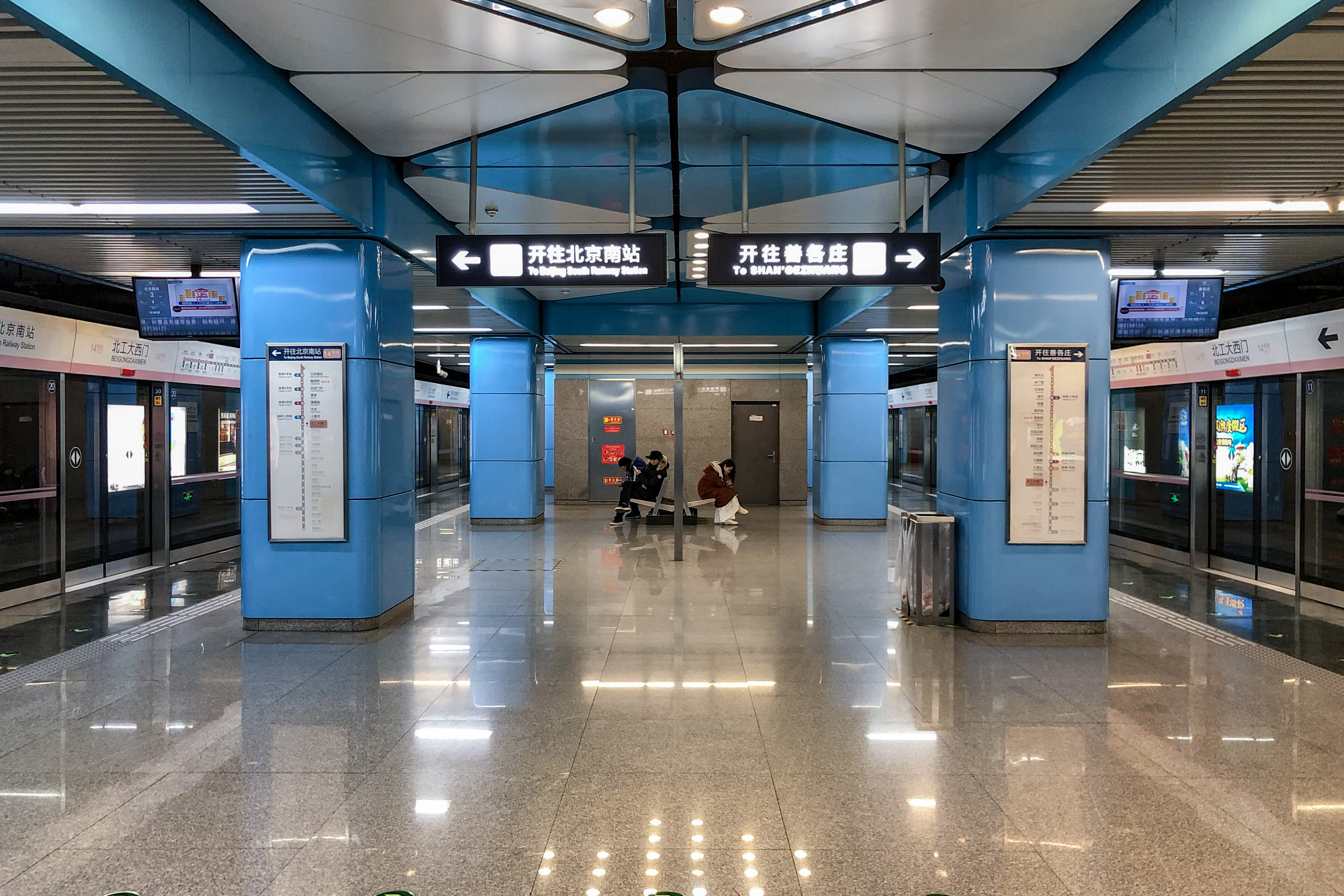
Station platform
