= Qilizhuang station =

Beijing Subway interchange station

Coordinates: 39.8661°N 116.2921°E

Qilizhuang 七里庄
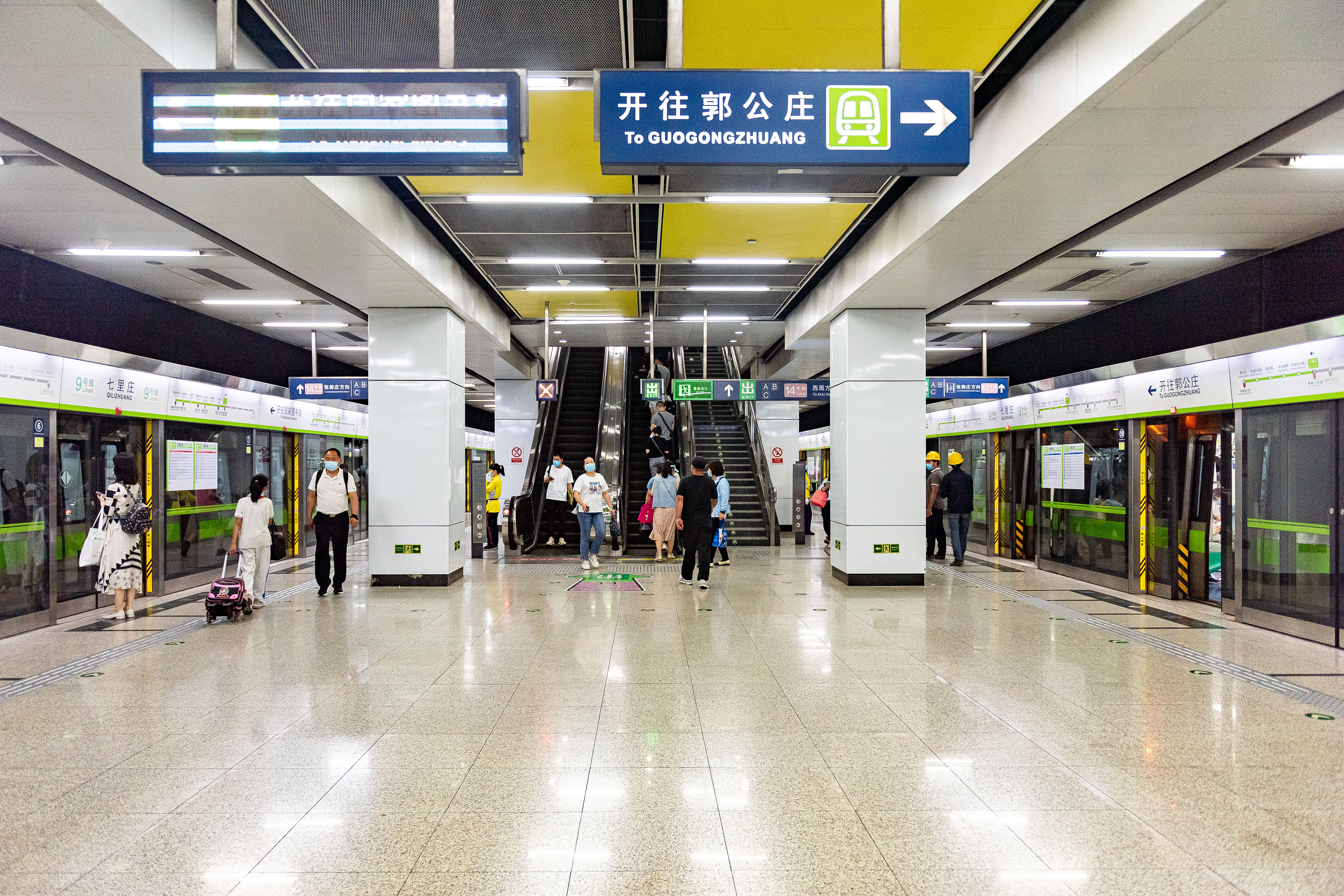
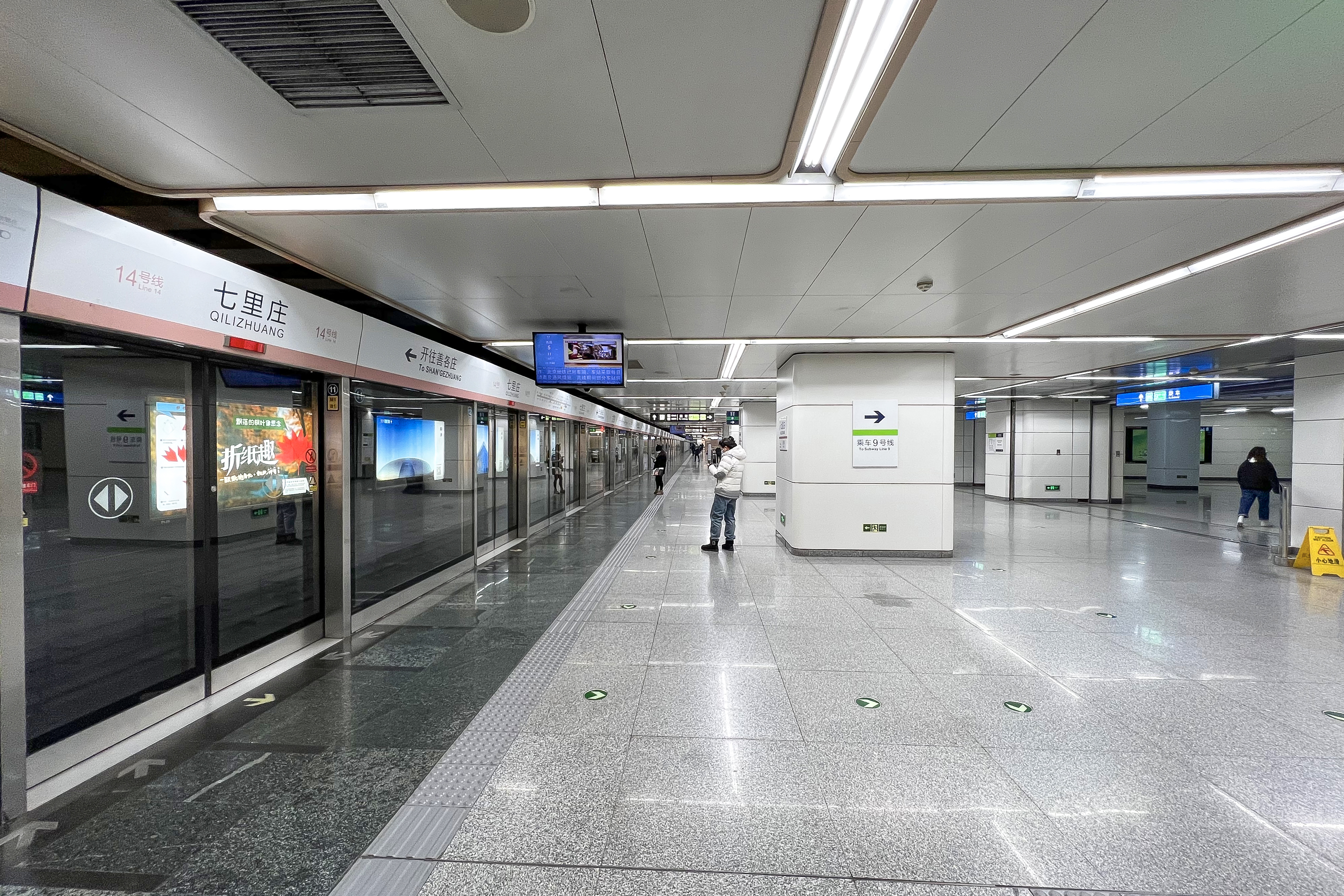
- Line 9 platform Line 14 eastbound platform

General information
- Location: North Fengtai Road (丰台北路) Wanfeng Road / East Street; Fengtai District, Beijing; China
- Operator: Beijing Mass Transit Railway Operation Corporation Limited (Line 9); Beijing MTR Corporation Limited (Line 14)
- Lines: Line 9; Line 14; Fangshan line (through service to Line 9)
- Platforms: 4 (1 island platform and 2 split side platforms)
- Tracks: 4

Construction
- Structure type: Underground
- Accessible: Yes

History
- Opened: December 31, 2011; 14 years ago (Line 9); February 15, 2014; 12 years ago (Line 14)

Services
Preceding station	Beijing Subway	Following station
Liuli Qiao towards National Library	Line 9	Fengtai Dongdajie towards Guogongzhuang
Liuli Qiao towards National Library	Fangshan line Through service (weekday peak only)	Fengtai Dongdajie towards Yancundong
Dajing towards Zhangguozhuang	Line 14	Xiju towards Shangezhuang
Location
- Location within Beijing

Qilizhuang (simplified Chinese: 七里庄站; traditional Chinese: 七里莊站; pinyin: Qīlǐzhuāng Zhàn) is an interchange station between Line 9 and Line 14 of the Beijing Subway. When Line 14 opened in May 2013, trains skipped this station. The station was opened to Line 14 trains on February 15, 2014.

== Station layout ==
The line 9 station uses an underground island platform, and the line 14 station uses 2 underground stacked side platforms. The eastbound line 14 platform is located under the line 9 platforms, whilst the westbound line 14 platform is located above the line 9 platforms.

== Exits ==
There are 6 exits, lettered A, B, C, E, G, and H. Exit A is accessible. There is also an unnamed accessible exit.

== Gallery ==
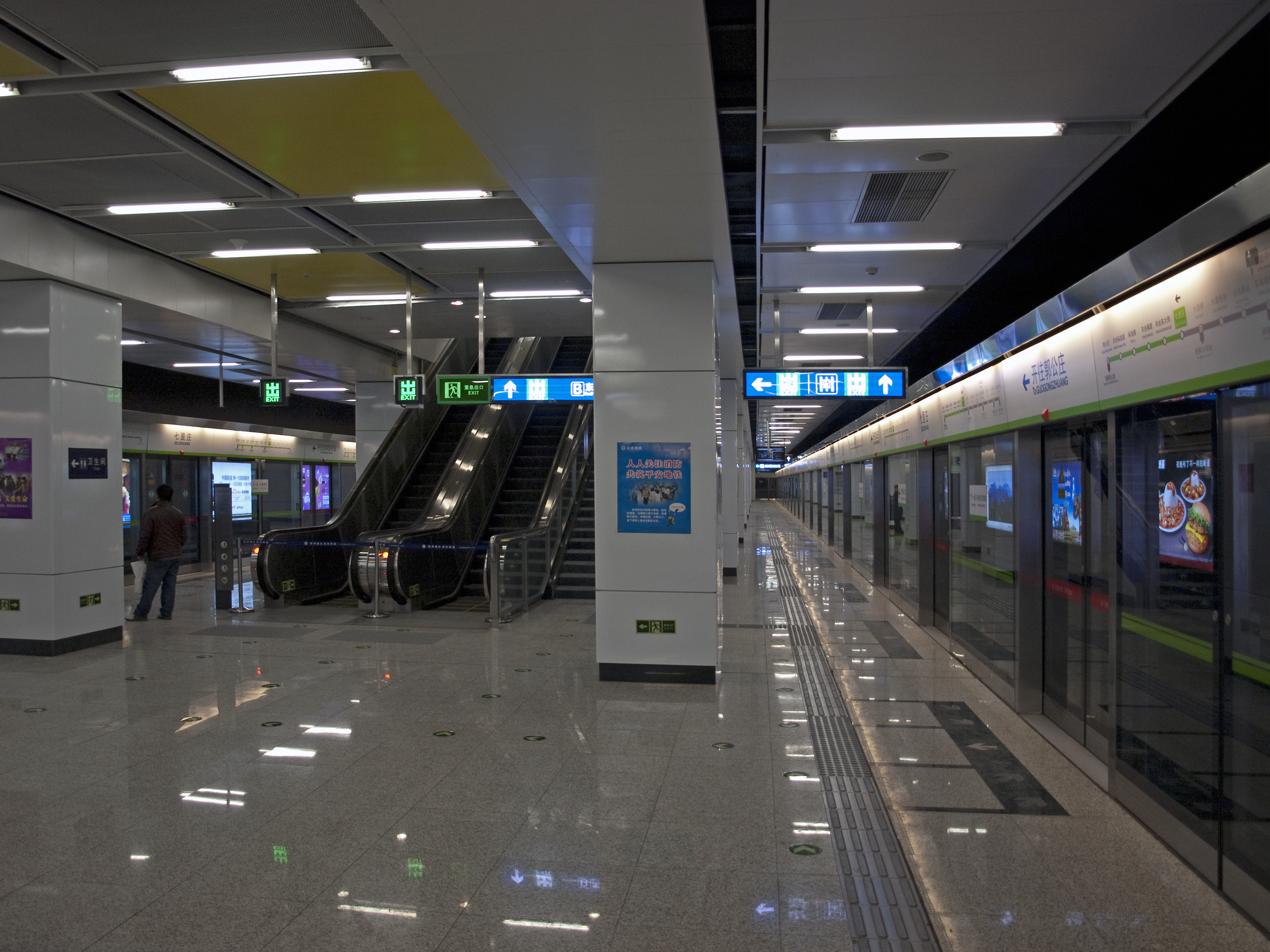
Line 9 platform

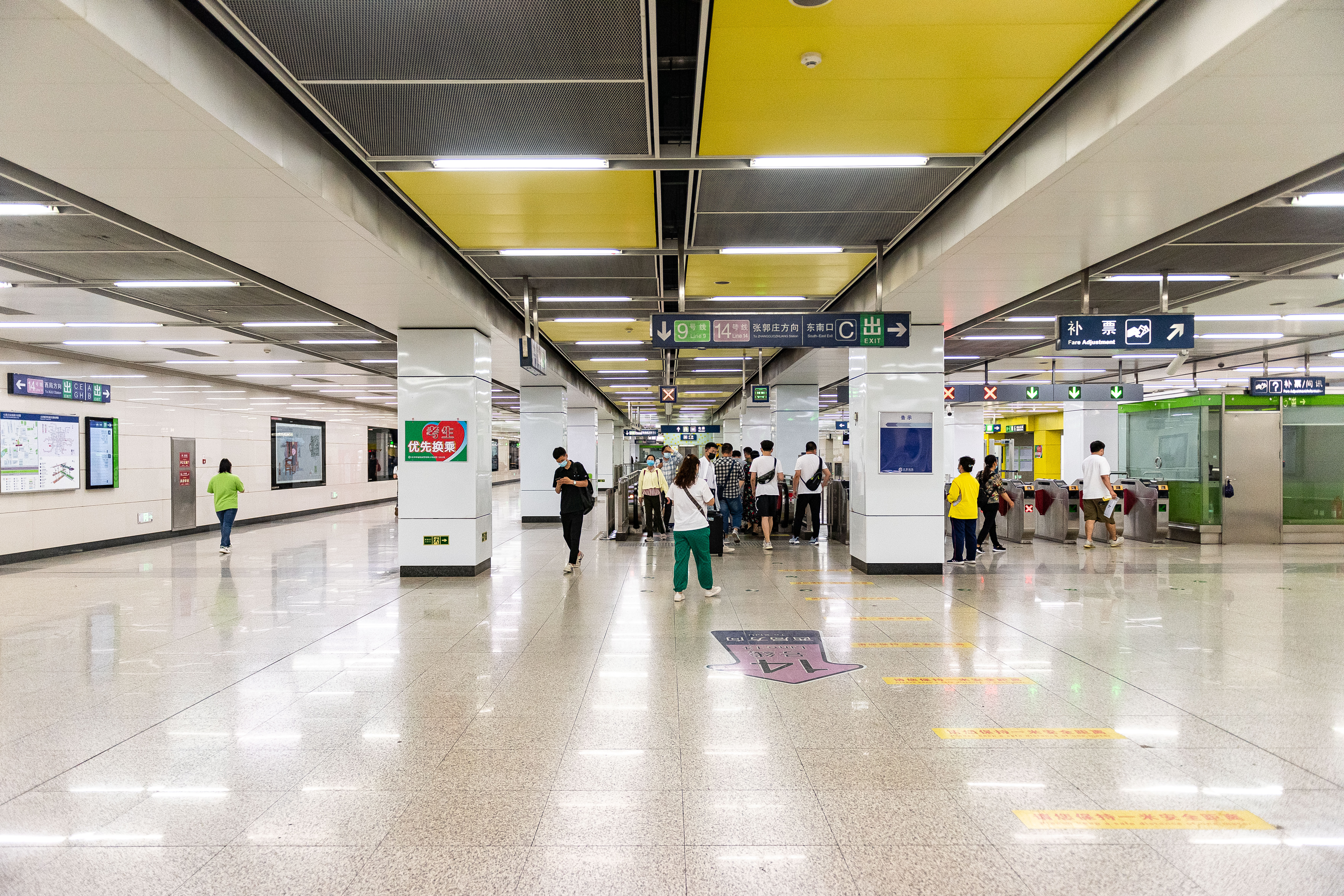
Line 9 concourse

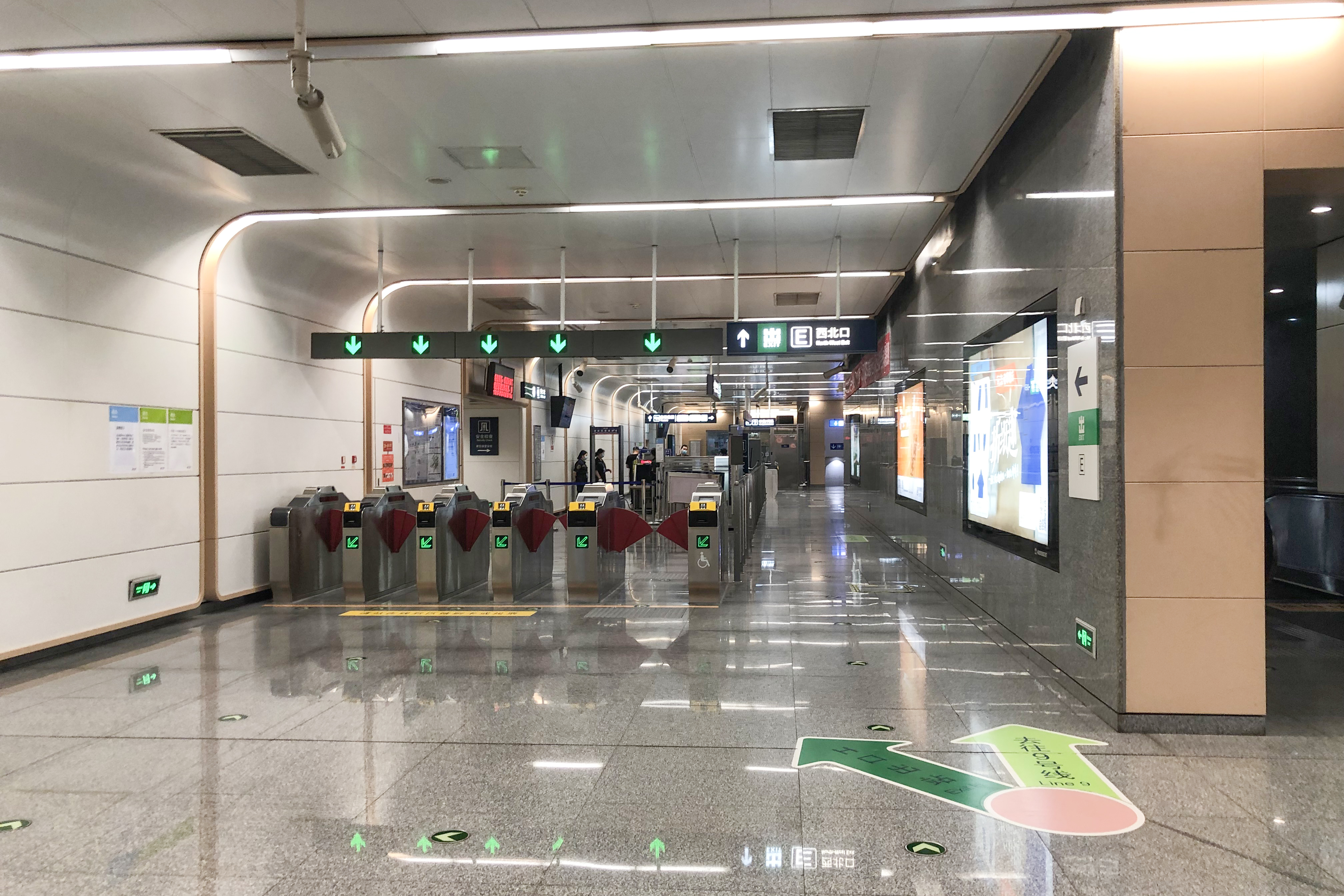
Line 14 west concourse

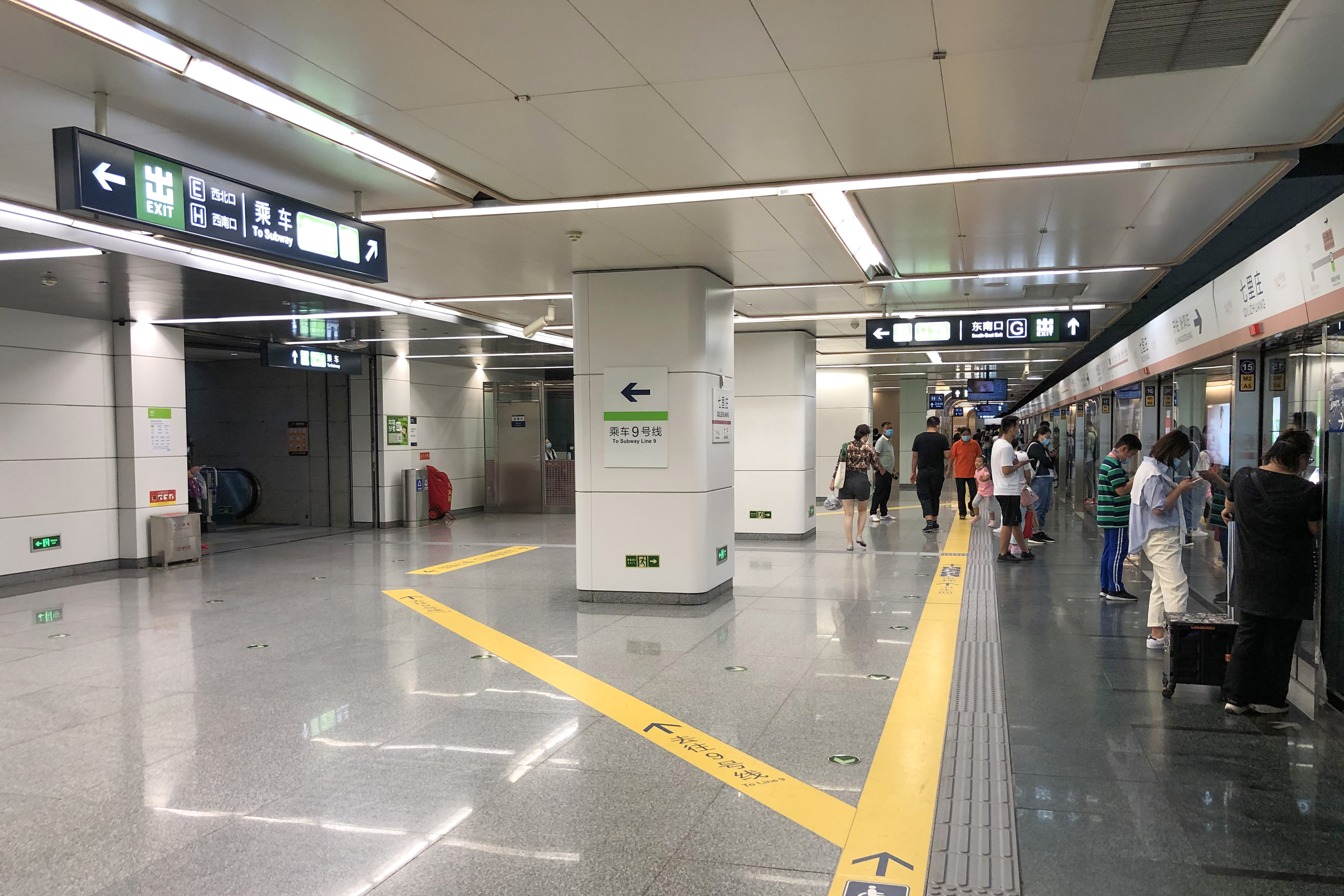
Line 14 westbound platform

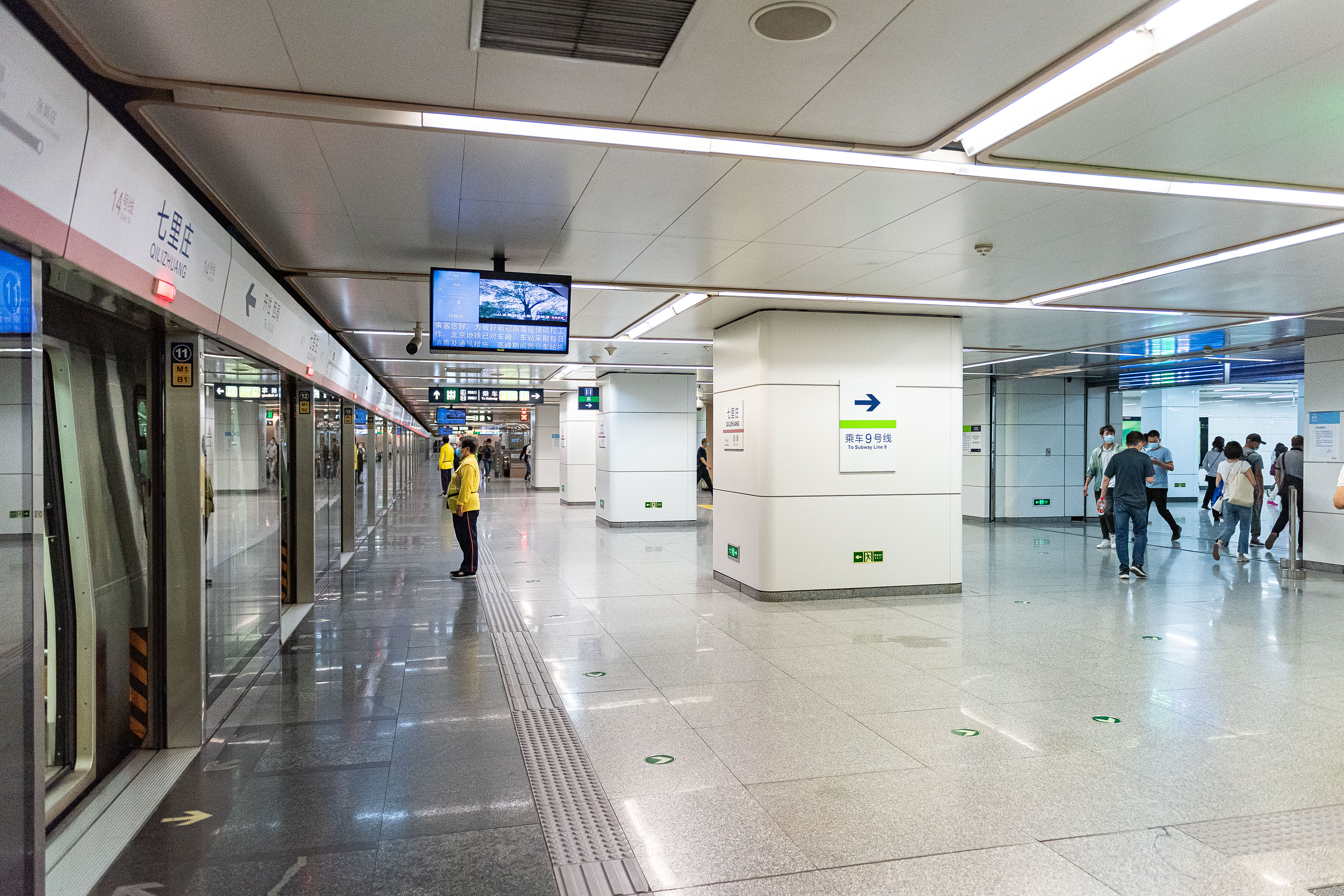
Line 14 eastbound platform
