= Donghuqu station =

Beijing Subway station

Coordinates: 40.0102°N 116.4674°E

Donghuqu 东湖渠
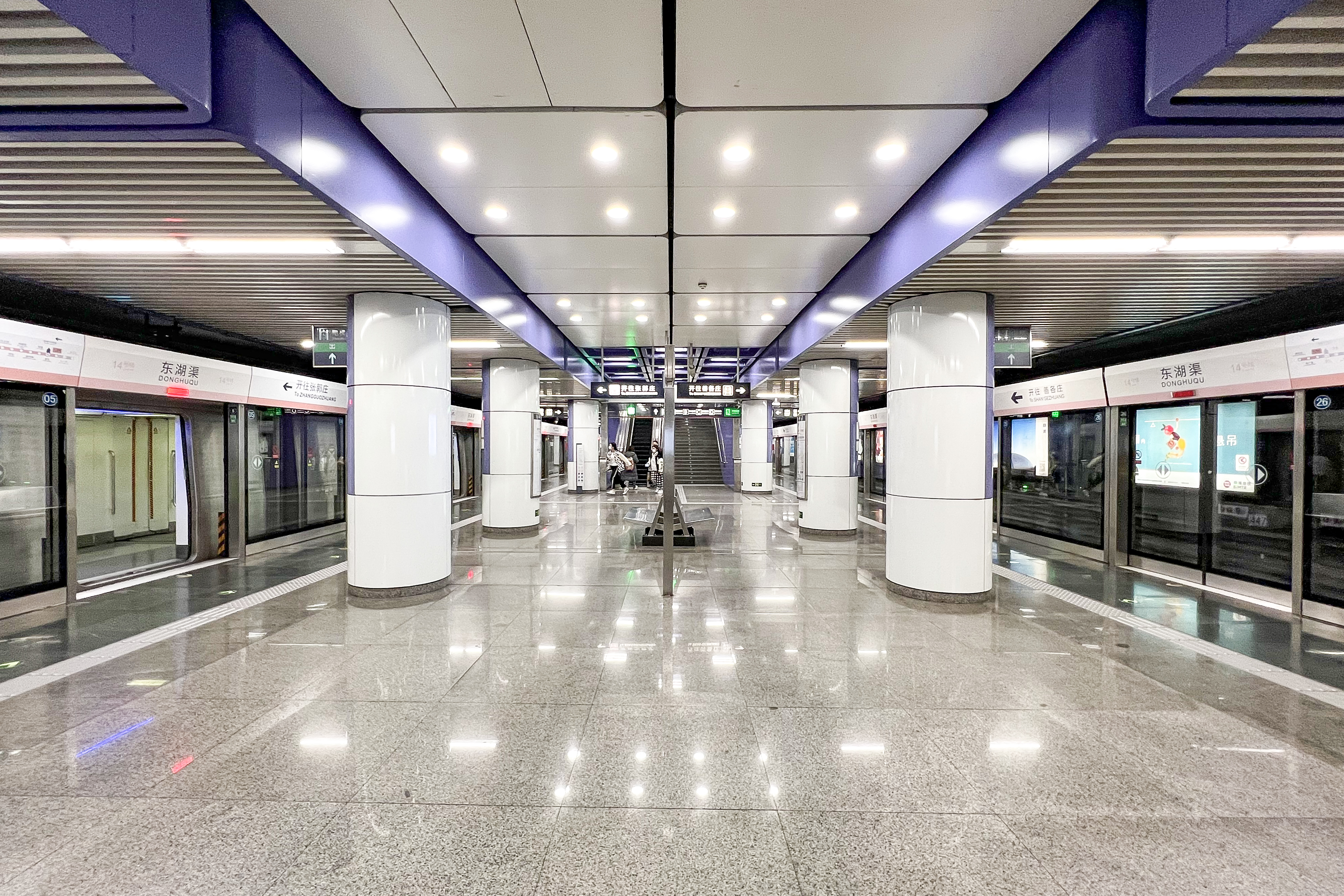
- Platform

General information
- Location: Guangshun North Street (广顺北大街) and North Wangjing Road (望京北路); Chaoyang District, Beijing; China
- Operator: Beijing MTR Corporation Limited
- Line: Line 14
- Platforms: 2 (1 island platform)
- Tracks: 2

Construction
- Structure type: Underground
- Accessible: Yes

History
- Opened: 28 December 2014

Services
Preceding station	Beijing Subway	Following station
Wangjing towards Zhangguozhuang	Line 14	Laiguangying towards Shangezhuang
Location
- Location within Beijing

Donghuqu (simplified Chinese: 东湖渠站; traditional Chinese: 東湖渠站; pinyin: Dōnghúqú Zhàn) is a station on Line 14 of the Beijing Subway. It is located in Chaoyang District. The station opened on 28 December 2014.

== Station layout ==
The station has an underground island platform.

== Exits ==
There are 4 exits, lettered A, B, C, and D. Exits A and C are accessible.
