= Laiguangying station =

Beijing Subway station

Laiguangying 来广营
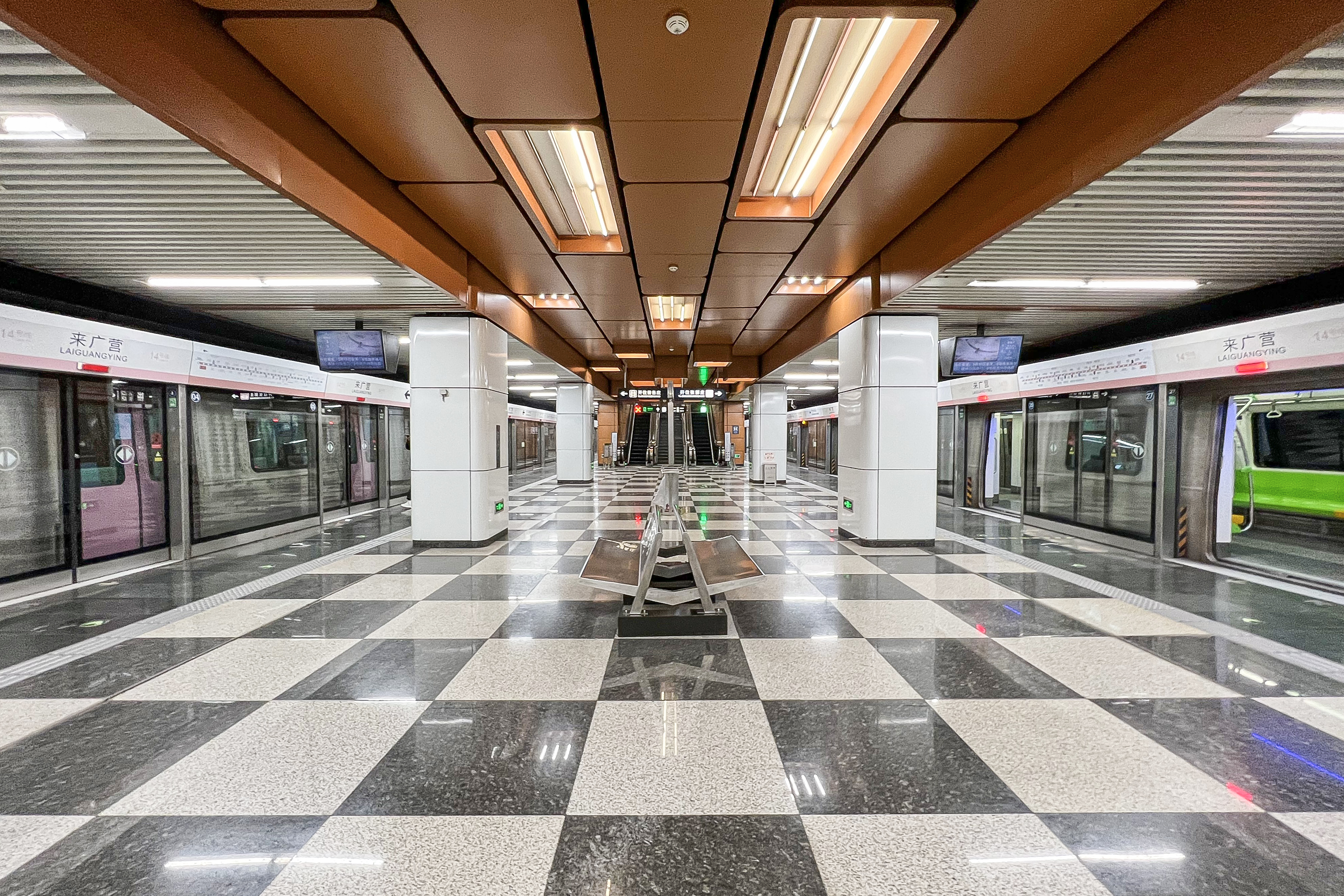
- Platform

General information
- Location: Guangshun North Street (广顺北大街) and West Laiguangying Road (来广营西路); Chaoyang District, Beijing; China
- Coordinates: 40°01′14″N 116°28′01″E
- Operator: Beijing MTR Corporation Limited
- Line: Line 14
- Platforms: 2 (1 island platform)
- Tracks: 2

Construction
- Structure type: Underground
- Accessible: Yes

History
- Opened: 28 December 2014

Services
Preceding station	Beijing Subway	Following station
Donghuqu towards Zhangguozhuang	Line 14	Shangezhuang Terminus
Location
- Location within Beijing

Laiguangying (simplified Chinese: 来广营站; traditional Chinese: 來廣營站; pinyin: Láiguǎngyíng Zhàn) is a station on Line 14 of the Beijing Subway. It is located in Chaoyang District. The station opened on 28 December 2014.

== Station layout ==
The station has an underground island platform.

== Exits ==
There are 4 exits, lettered A, B, C, and D. Exit D is accessible.
