= Taoran Qiao station =

Future Beijing Subway station

Taoran Qiao 陶然桥

General information
- Location: Intersection of Nanzhanxingfu Rd. and Majiapu East Road, Dongcheng District, Beijing; China
- Coordinates: 39°52′02″N 116°22′51″E
- Operator: Beijing MTR Corporation Limited
- Line: Line 14
- Platforms: 2 (1 island platform)
- Tracks: 2

Construction
- Structure type: Underground
- Accessible: Yes

History
- Opening: To be determined
Location
- Location within Beijing

Taoran Qiao station (Chinese: 陶然桥站; pinyin: Táorán Qiáo zhàn) is a station under construction on Line 14 of the Beijing Subway. Due to ongoing difficulty with site demolition, the opening date for the station has not yet been determined.

== History ==
The station was supposed to open in 2015, along with the rest of Line 14 extension. Due to a delay with construction, the station could not be opened with the rest of the stations, so trains do not stop. The opening date for the station has not yet been determined.

== Station layout ==
This station will have an island platform.
