= Line 14 (Beijing Subway) =

Railway line in Beijing, China

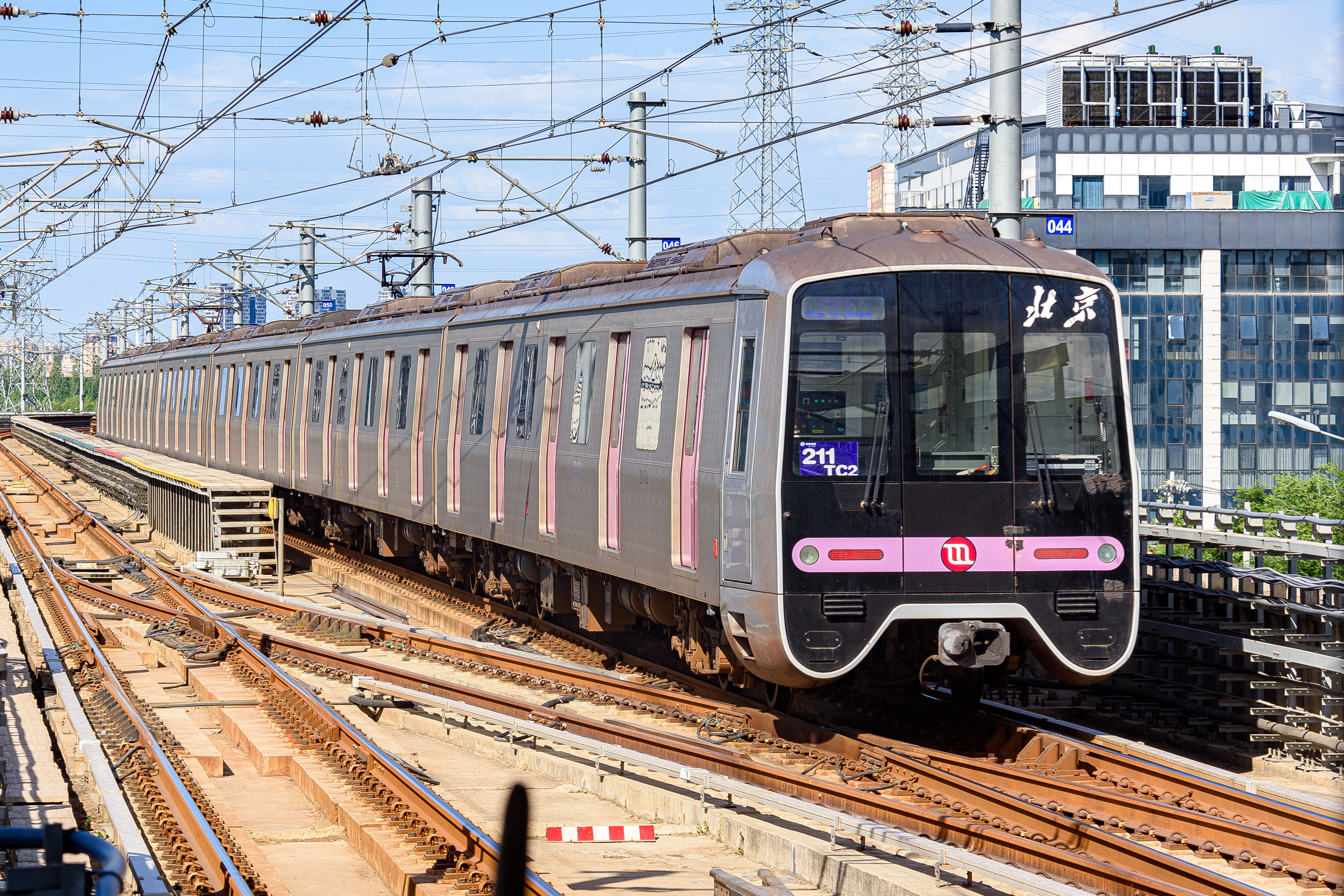
- Line 14 train leaving Zhangguozhuang station

Overview
- Other name: M14 (planned name)
- Status: Operational
- Locale: Chaoyang, Fengtai, and Dongcheng districts Beijing
- Termini: Zhangguozhuang; Shangezhuang
- Stations: 36 (33 in operation)
- Website: www.mtr.bj.cn

Service
- Type: Rapid transit
- System: Beijing Subway
- Operator: Beijing MTR Corporation Limited
- Depot(s): Zhangyicun, Maquanying
- Rolling stock: 6-car Type A (DKZ53, SFM18)
- Daily ridership: 724,200 (2024 Avg.)

History
- Opened: 5 May 2013; 13 years ago

Technical
- Line length: 47.3 km (29.4 mi)
- Character: Underground, Elevated
- Track gauge: 1,435 mm (4 ft 8 1/2 in) standard gauge
- Electrification: 1,500 V DC from overhead catenary
- Operating speed: 80 km/h (50 mph)

Line 14 of the Beijing Subway (Chinese: 北京地铁14号线; pinyin: běijīng dìtiě shísì hàoxiàn) is a rapid transit rail line in the south and east of Beijing. The line is operated by the Beijing MTR Corporation Limited. Line 14's color is silver pink.

It runs across the southern and eastern fringes of urban Beijing from Zhangguozhuang west of the Yongding River in the southwest corner of the city to Shangezhuang in the northeast corner. Line 14 will be 47.3 km (29.4 mi) in length and have 36 stations (33 in operation).

== Description ==
West section: The stations from Zhangguozhuang to Xiju, on the southwest corner of the Line 10 loop, opened on May 5, 2013. The infill Qilizhuang station opened on 15 February 2014.

Middle section (also known as the Lize section): The stations in between Xiju and Beijing South railway station opened on 31 December 2021.

East section: The east section opened in two phases. Stations from Shangezhuang to Jintai Lu opened on 28 December 2014; and the stations from Jintai Lu to Beijing South railway station opened on 26 December 2015. Infills Chaoyang Park station and Pingleyuan station opened on 31 December 2016 and 30 December 2017 respectively. Hongmiao, Gaojiayuan, and Taoran Qiao are not yet operational. Hongmiao will open in late 2026 in tandem with Line 22. There is currently no opening date for the other two stations.

== Rolling Stock ==
Line 14 uses DKZ53 and SFM18 trains. They are the first high-capacity wide-body A-Type trains in the Beijing Subway. These trains were designed in nine months by Changchun Railway Vehicles Co., Ltd. and there are now 63 six-car A-Type trains operating on Line 14. These trains entered revenue service 15 months after contract award.

Model	Exterior	Interior	Manufacturer	Year built	Amount in service	Fleet numbers	Depot
DKZ53			CRRC Changchun Railway Vehicles	2012	38	201–238	Maquanying; Zhangyicun
SFM18			CRRC Qingdao Sifang	2012	25	239–263	Maquanying; Zhangyicun

== List of stations ==
- Service A: Zhangguozhuang to Shangezhuang
- Service B: Lize Shangwuqu to Shangezhuang

Service routes		Station name		Connections	Nearby bus stops	Distance km		Location
A	B	English	Chinese	Connections	Nearby bus stops	Distance km		Location
●		Zhangguozhuang	张郭庄		310 565 574 624 830 843 专65 专100 专146 专177 专178	0.000	0.000	Fengtai
●		Garden Expo Park	园博园		391 574 830 903 专33 专115	1.345	1.345	Fengtai
●		Dawayao	大瓦窑		546 973 专17 专38	4.073	5.418	Fengtai
●		Guozhuangzi	郭庄子		507 554 634	1.236	6.654	Fengtai
●		Dajing	大井		351 390 458 830	2.044	8.698	Fengtai
●		Qilizhuang	七里庄	9	77 83 137 323 400快 458 477 480 483 531 830 839 840 896 958 969 973 夜36 专3	1.579	10.277	Fengtai
●		Xiju	西局	10	83 323 458 480 483 531 830 958 969 973 夜36	0.845	11.122	Fengtai
●		Dongguantou	东管头		74 83 134 458 629 830 958 977 997 专27	1.489	12.611	Fengtai
●	●	Lize Shangwuqu	丽泽商务区	16	74 83 458 629 958 977 997	0.958	13.569	Fengtai
●	●	Caihuying	菜户营		5 59 74 83 395 458 629 830 958 977 997 专138	0.828	14.397	Fengtai
●	●	Xitieying	西铁营		30 56 专155 专176	1.462	15.859	Fengtai
●	●	Jingfengmen	景风门	19	14 48 88 454 474 专155	0.883	16.742	Fengtai
●	●	Beijing South railway station	北京南站	4 VNP	106 133 200 343 381 414 458 485 529 665 夜24 专18 专155	1.164	17.906	Fengtai
｜	｜	Taoran Qiao	陶然桥			—	—	Dongcheng
●	●	Yongdingmenwai	永定门外	8	2 7 24 25 40 71 72 93 120 622 849 997 BRT1(快速公交1) 夜2 专6 专202	1.950	19.856	Dongcheng
●	●	Jingtai	景泰		7 17 24 25 62 141 夜28 专6 专202	1.119	20.975	Dongcheng
●	●	Puhuangyu	蒲黄榆	5	25 39 53 54 91 122 128 141 200 599 821 957 夜24 夜28 专161 专162 专202	1.025	22.000	Fengtai
●	●	Fangzhuang	方庄		12 50 51 84 91 122 139 200 352 511 夜28 专161 专162	1.486	23.486	Fengtai
●	●	Shilihe	十里河	10 17	28 53 300 300快 352 368 378 439 440 513 638 649 680 687 846 848 973 975 976 985 986 995 快速直达专线217 夜30 专19	1.618	25.104	Chaoyang
●	●	Beijing Univ. of Tech West Gate	北工大西门		34 513 535 605 973 985 专10	2.423	27.527	Chaoyang
●	●	Pingle Yuan	平乐园		35 41 52 348 402 457 486 513 535 605 637 973 985 通医专线4 夜7 夜19	1.128	28.655	Chaoyang
●	●	Jiulongshan	九龙山	7	11 23 35 54 312 348 486 513 561 605 669 973 985 快速直达专线85 快速直达专线192 通医专线4 夜7 夜29 专87	0.897	29.552	Chaoyang
●	●	Dawang Lu	大望路	1	1 1区 11 31 54 57 58 138 382 388 405 486 595 605 666 667 668 804 812 815 815快 817 818 818快 823 930 973 985 988 快速直达专线5 快速直达专线20 快速直达专线61 夜1 夜27 夜34 专165	1.780	31.332	Chaoyang
｜	｜	Hongmiao	红庙			—	—	Chaoyang
●	●	Jintai Lu	金台路	6	9 31 75 117 126 135 140 412 419 486 640 682 973 985 988	1.602	32.934	Chaoyang
●	●	Chaoyang Park	朝阳公园	3	31 117 135 302 406 412 419 431 499 650 675 682 690 973 988 夜3	1.085	34.019	Chaoyang
●	●	Zaoying	枣营		419 682 988 专114	1.221	35.240	Chaoyang
●	●	Dongfeng Beiqiao	东风北桥		4 400 400快 402 413 451 657 988	2.173	37.413	Chaoyang
●	●	Jiangtai	将台		4 401 408 418 445 516 571 659 847 973 988 991 专123 专124 专195	1.600	39.013	Chaoyang
｜	｜	Gaojiayuan	高家园	12		—	—	Chaoyang
●	●	Wangjing Nan (S)	望京南		359 401 403 404 451 593 641 696 850 915 916 921 935	1.847	40.860	Chaoyang
●	●	Futong	阜通		132 404 451 593 604 617 855 921 966 快速直达专线38 快速直达专线194 专15 专212	1.168	42.028	Chaoyang
●	●	Wangjing	望京	15	130 132 404 416 451 593 604 617 621 851 855 928 966 991 专15	0.903	42.931	Chaoyang
●	●	Donghuqu	东湖渠		130 132 311 404 409 450 451 547 593 613 617 657 851 855 939 944 966 快速直达专线194 专112	1.283	44.214	Chaoyang
●	●	Laiguangying	来广营		311 404 409 415 416 450 451 467 604 613 621 855 858 928 936 939 944 966 991 专213	1.100	45.314	Chaoyang
●	●	Shangezhuang	善各庄		415 467 547 859 882 944 991 专116 专122 专140 专213 专219	1.364	46.678	Chaoyang

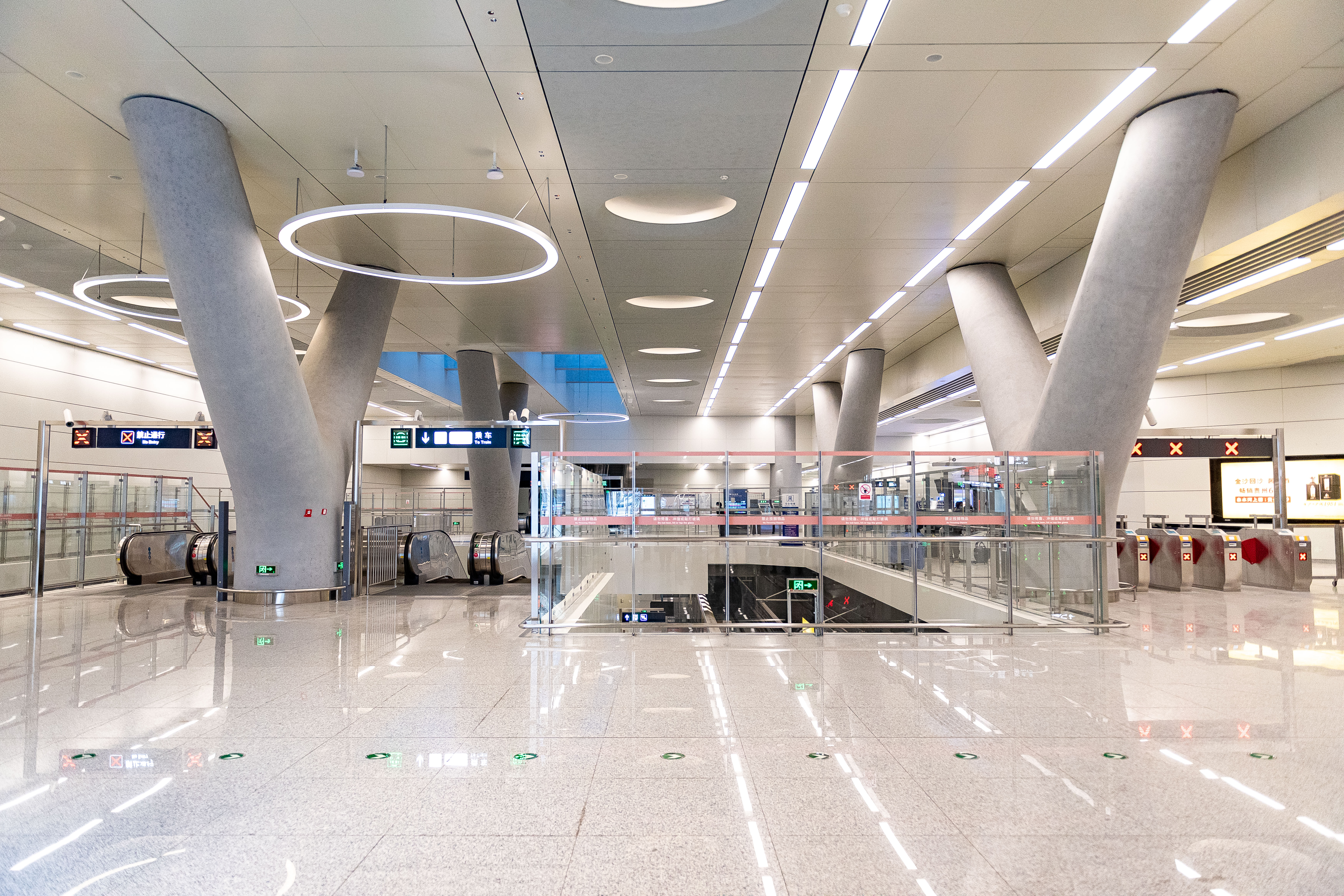
Lize Shangwuqu Station

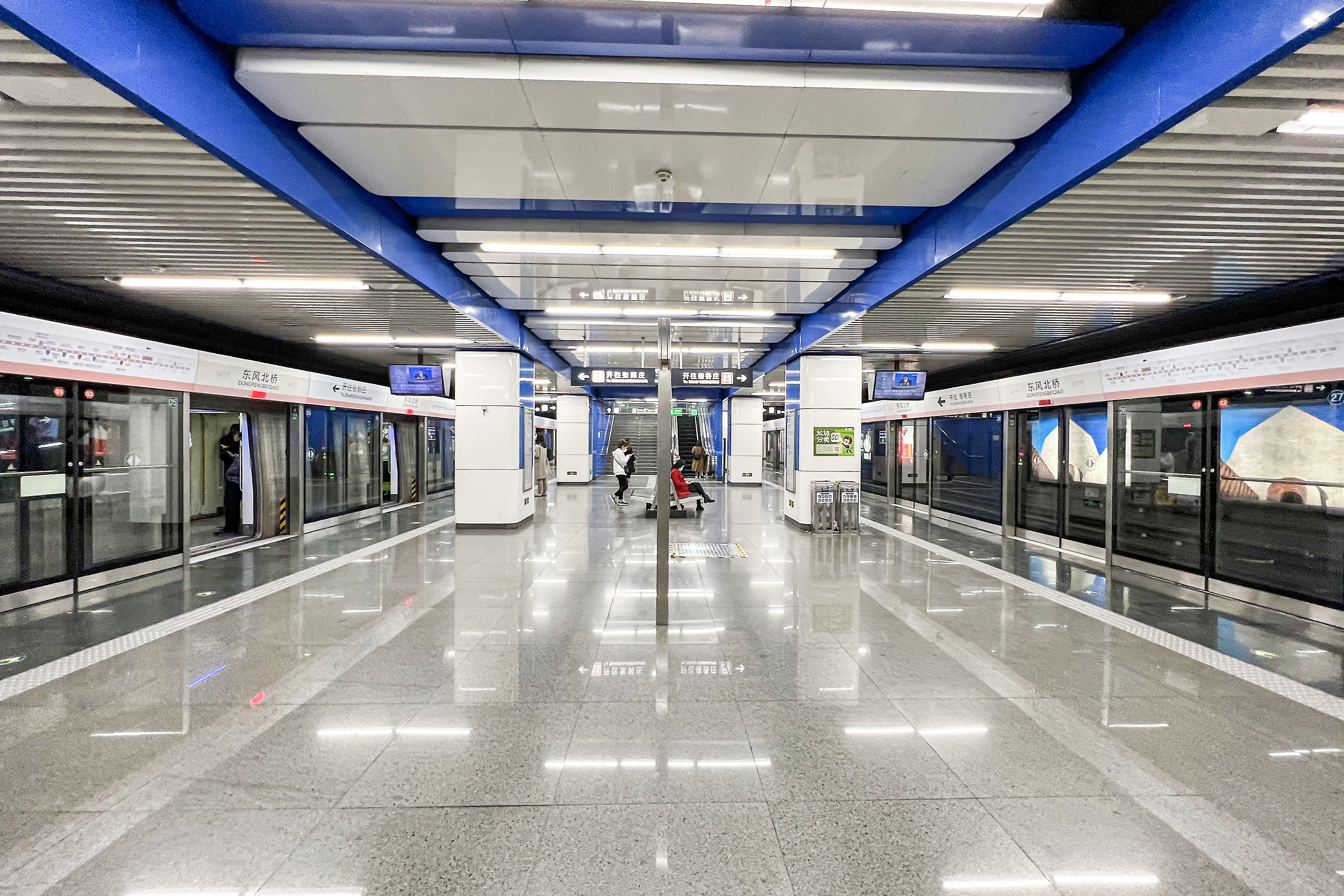
Dongfeng Beiqiao Station

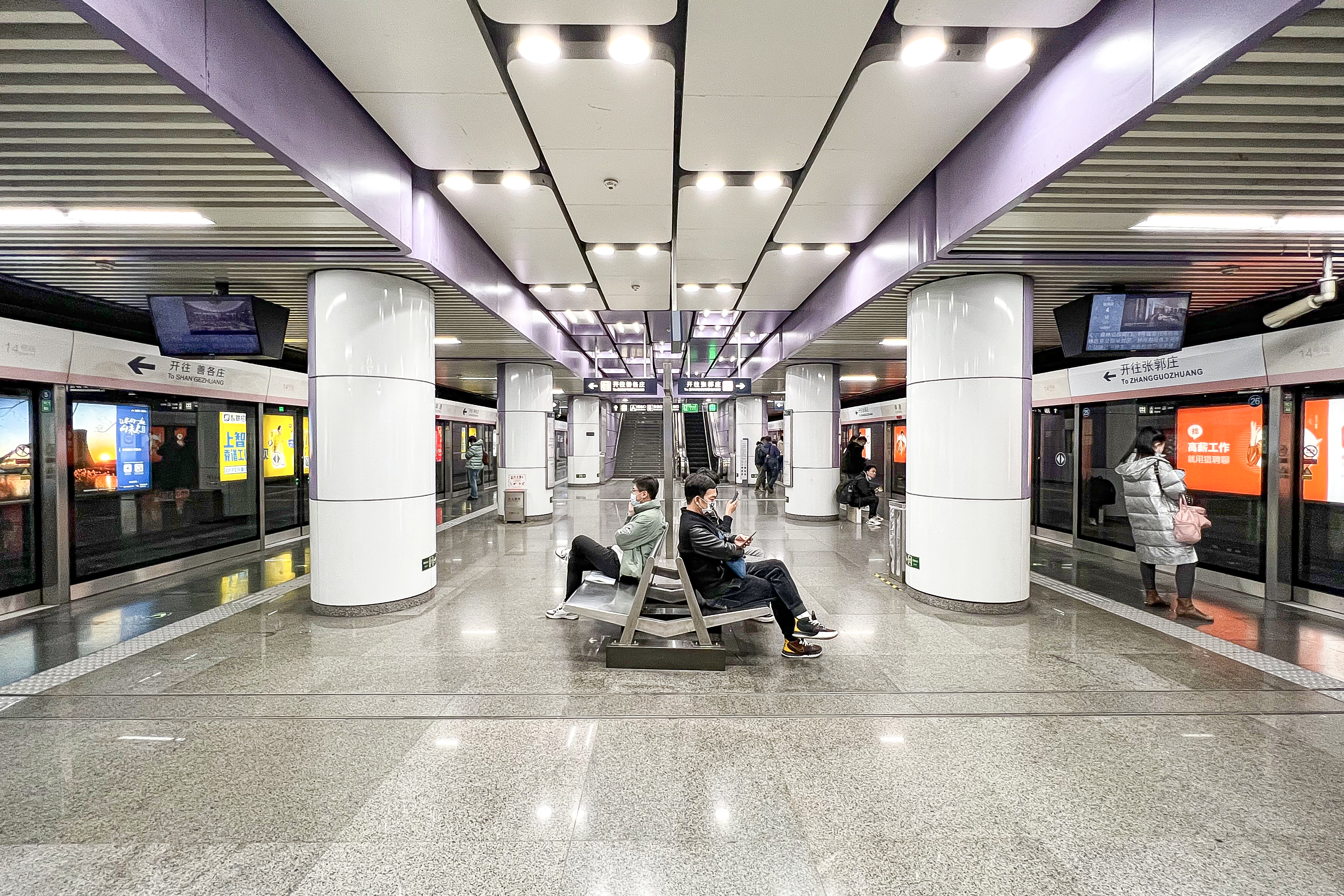
Futong Station

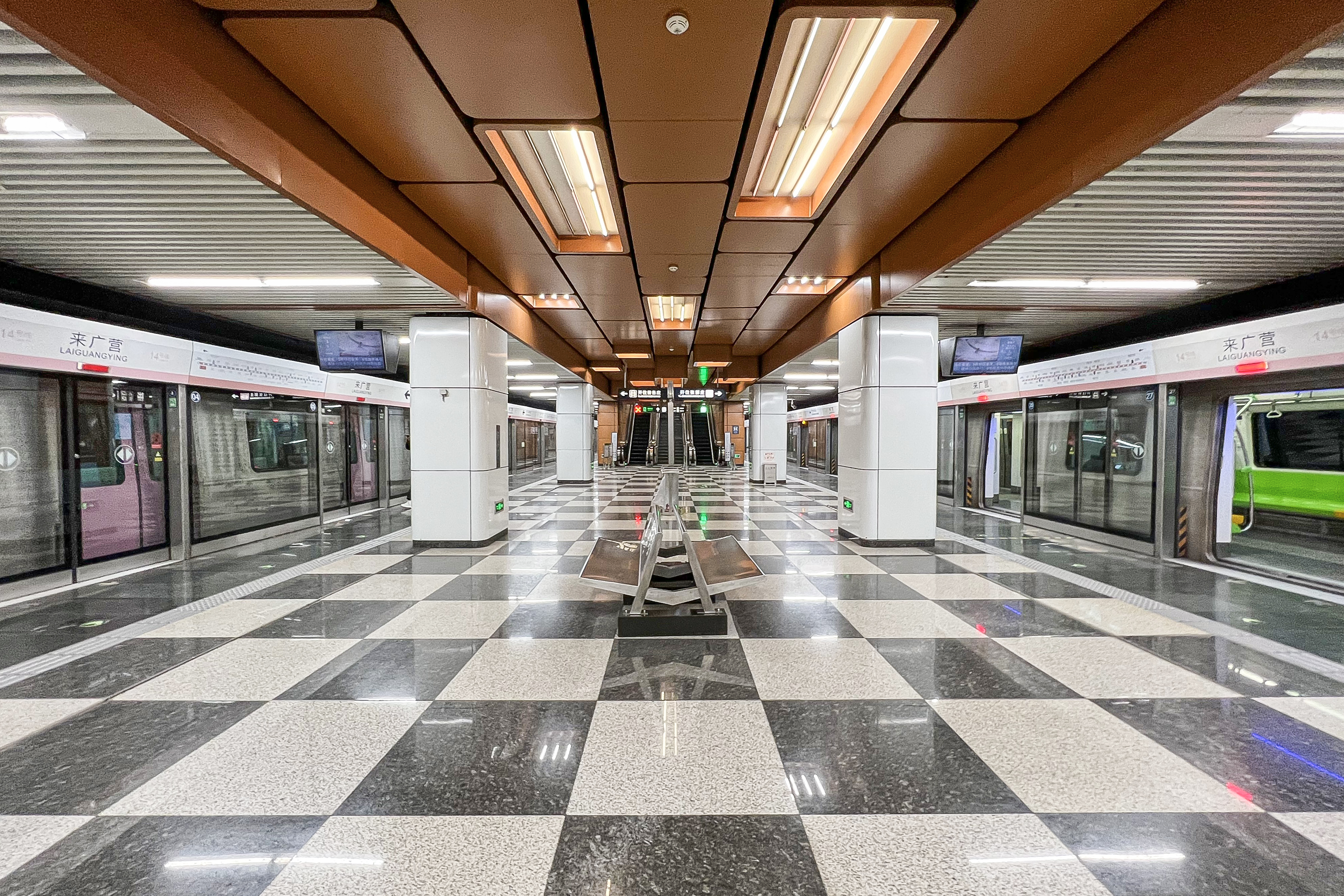
Laiguangying Station

== Route ==
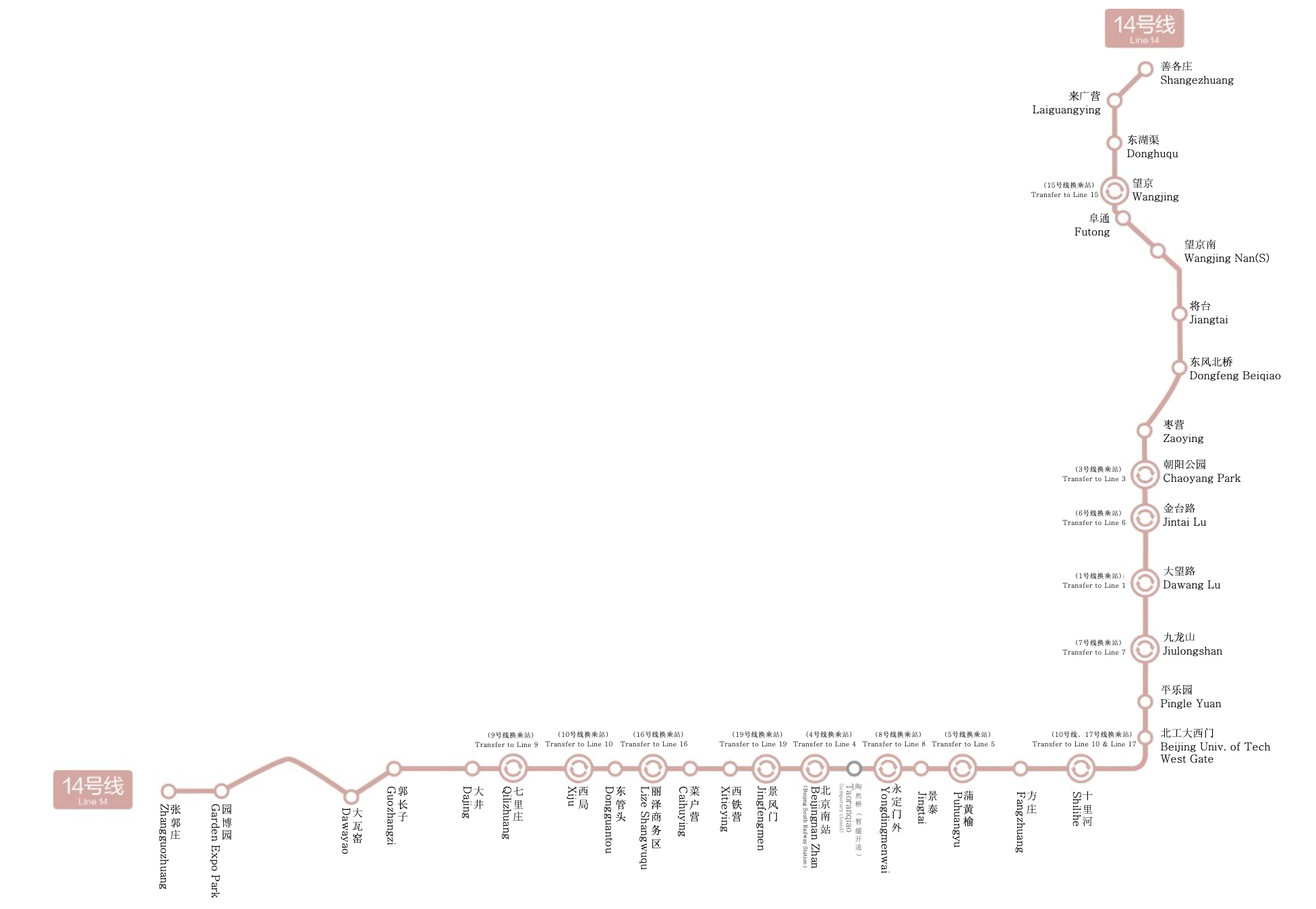
Map of Line 14, as of November 14, 2025.

The precise route of Line 14 has been revised several times even after construction began.

The line is designed to follow an inverted-L-shaped route running from the southwestern corner of urban Beijing in Fengtai District to the northeastern corner in Chaoyang District. Currently, Line 14 is now fully operational.

In the west section, Line 14 begins at Zhangguozhuang on Yuanboyuan South Road, west of the Yongding River. The line crosses the river to Zhangyi Village and enters the 5th Ring Road. Going east on Fengtai South Road, Line 14 passes by the Fengtai Sports Center, enters the 4th Ring Road and continues eastward on Fengtai Road to Xiju on the Line 10 loop.

The middle section continues on Lize Road inside the 3rd Ring Road and then meets Line 4 at the Beijing South railway station.

The east section runs east from Beijing South railway station. It crosses Line 5 at Puhuangyu and follows the Pufang Road through the Fangzhuang residential neighborhood. It leaves the 3rd Ring Road at Shilihe and continues eastward until it abruptly turns north at Xidawang Road. Then it runs north, between the eastern 3rd and 4th Ring Roads. After passing the Beijing University of Technology, the line crosses Line 7 at Jiulongshan and Line 1 at Dawang Lu. Further north, the Xidawang Road turns into Jintai Road. The line crosses Line 6 at Jintailu and runs north through Chaoyang Park. Upon leaving the 4th Ring Road, Line 14 enters the vast Wangjing sub-district. The line bisects Wangjing from south to north on Guangshun South and North Streets and intersects with Line 15 at the heart of Wangjing. After leaving Wangjing, the line emerges north of the 5th Ring Road and terminates at Shangezhuang.

== History ==
- 23 September 2008: Construction of Line 14 set to begin by the end of 2008.
- 6 November 2009: Commencement of construction deferred; may begin by the end of 2009
- 7 January 2010: Commencement of construction set to begin in 2010.
- 29 April 2010: Construction begins.
- 6 November 2012: BJMTR entered into another PPP Concession Agreement for Line 14.
- 5 May 2013: The West section, from Zhangguozhuang to Xiju opens.
- 15 February 2014: An infill station on west section, Qilizhuang Station opens.
- 26 November 2014: BJMTR and Beijing Municipal Government officially signed the "Beijing Metro Line 14 Project Concession Agreement" under PPP contract.
- 28 December 2014: The 1st part of east section, from Shangezhuang Station to Jintailu Station opens.
- 26 December 2015: The 2nd part of east section, from Jintailu Station to Beijing South railway station, opens.
- 31 December 2016: An infill station on East section, Chaoyang Park station opens.
- 30 December 2017: An infill station on East section, Pingleyuan station opens.
- 31 December 2021: The middle section from Xiju to Beijing South Railway Station opens.

=== Opening timeline ===
Segment	Commencement	Length	Station(s)	Name
Zhangguozhuang — Xiju	5 May 2013	12.4 km (7.71 mi)	6	western section
Qilizhuang	15 February 2014	Infill station	1	
Jintai Lu — Shangezhuang	28 December 2014	14.8 km (9.20 mi)	10	1st part of eastern section
Beijing South Railway Station — Jintai Lu	26 December 2015	16.6 km (10.31 mi)	9	2nd part of eastern section
Chaoyang Park	31 December 2016	Infill station	1	
Pingleyuan	30 December 2017	Infill station	1	
Beijing South Railway Station — Xiju	31 December 2021	4 km (2.5 mi)	5	central section

== West extension ==
There was a plan to extended Line 14 from its western terminus, Zhangguozhuang station. However in July 2022, it was announced the western extension of Line 14 is replaced by the branch of Line 1.

== Controversy ==
=== Western terminal ===
The proposed final routing of Line 14 headed through Zhangyicun, near Marco Polo Bridge. However, residents of Dujiakan and nearby Wanpingcheng wanted the subway to be routed south and terminating in their neighborhoods instead. Wanpingcheng residents argued that the neighborhood's more than 60,000 residents as well as a sculpture park, a war memorial, Wanping Fortress (Wanpingcheng) and many other attractions need better public transport options. In addition roads going through Dujiakan are severely congested with traffic. The terrain, rivers and railways going through the area have made it difficult to construct new roads to the surrounding areas. The end of 2008, residents gathered thousands of signatures. Finally, the Planning Commission explained that building a subway to Wanpingcheng is more difficult, Line 14 will run via Zhangyicun as originally planned. Ultimately, Wanpingcheng will be served by Wanpingcheng station on Line 16 which started construction in 2013.

=== Northern terminal ===
By the end of 2009, Tiantongyuan and Wangjing residents disputed the proposed alignment of Line 14's northern portion. Tiantongyuan is a large residential area within Beijing's northern Changping District. Tiantongyuan is heavily dependent on Beiyuan road, Anli Road and Subway Line 5. Both roads and the Metro line suffer from congestion. The existing Line 5 only serves the west side of Tiantongyuan and is over capacity. The Tiantongyuan online community launched a petition to extend Line 14 into Tiantongyuan. Tiantongyuan and its periphery argue that with the new developments being built in the area, traffic demand will be large. The extension of Line 14 into the area will improve access and transport capacity. Wangjing residents opposed the proposal put forward by Tiantongyuan residents believing that the huge passenger flow from an extension to Tiantongyuan will overwhelm Line 14 which is already slated to serve their neighborhood. Wangjing is a large community with significant commercial areas in Chaoyang District north east of the fourth ring road. Although numerous buses connect Wangjing with its vicinity and the city center, it is still suffering from traffic congestion. The existing Line 13 Wangjing West station is too far from the commercial center of Wangjing, making access inconvenient. Wangjing residents proposed Line 14 to terminate at Wangjing as originally planned. The proposal by Tiantongyuan residents was rejected by planning authorities. Instead authorities proposed to construct a new north south express subway line called Line 17 (formerly R2 line) through eastern Tiantongyuan to better serve the area. Construction of Line 17 began in 2015.
