= Shangezhuang station =

Beijing Subway station

Shangezhuang 善各庄
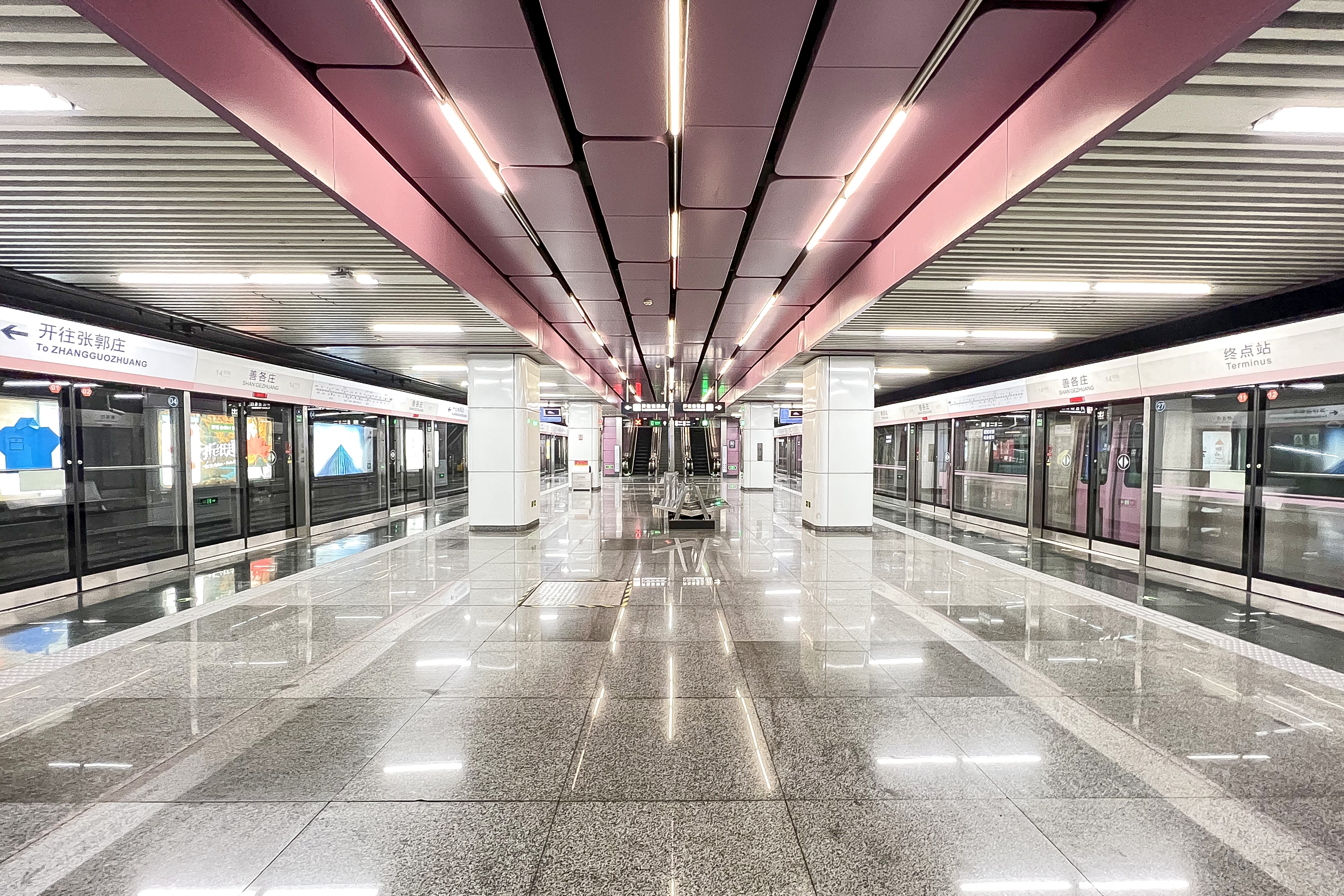
- Platform in March 2022

General information
- Location: Cuigezhuang, Chaoyang District, Beijing; China
- Coordinates: 40°01′38″N 116°28′42″E
- Operator: Beijing MTR Corporation Limited
- Line: Line 14
- Platforms: 2 (1 island platform)
- Tracks: 2

Construction
- Structure type: Underground
- Accessible: Yes

History
- Opened: December 28, 2014

Services
Preceding station	Beijing Subway	Following station
Laiguangying towards Zhangguozhuang	Line 14	Terminus
Location
- Location within Beijing

Shangezhuang Station (simplified Chinese: 善各庄站; traditional Chinese: 善各莊站; pinyin: Shàngèzhuāng Zhàn) is a station on Line 14 of the Beijing Subway. It is located in Chaoyang District. It was opened on December 28, 2014, and serves as the northern terminus of the line.

== Station layout ==
The station has an underground island platform.

== Exits ==
There are 4 exits, lettered A, B, C, and D. Exit C is accessible.
