= Zhangguozhuang station =

Beijing Subway station

Zhangguozhuang 张郭庄
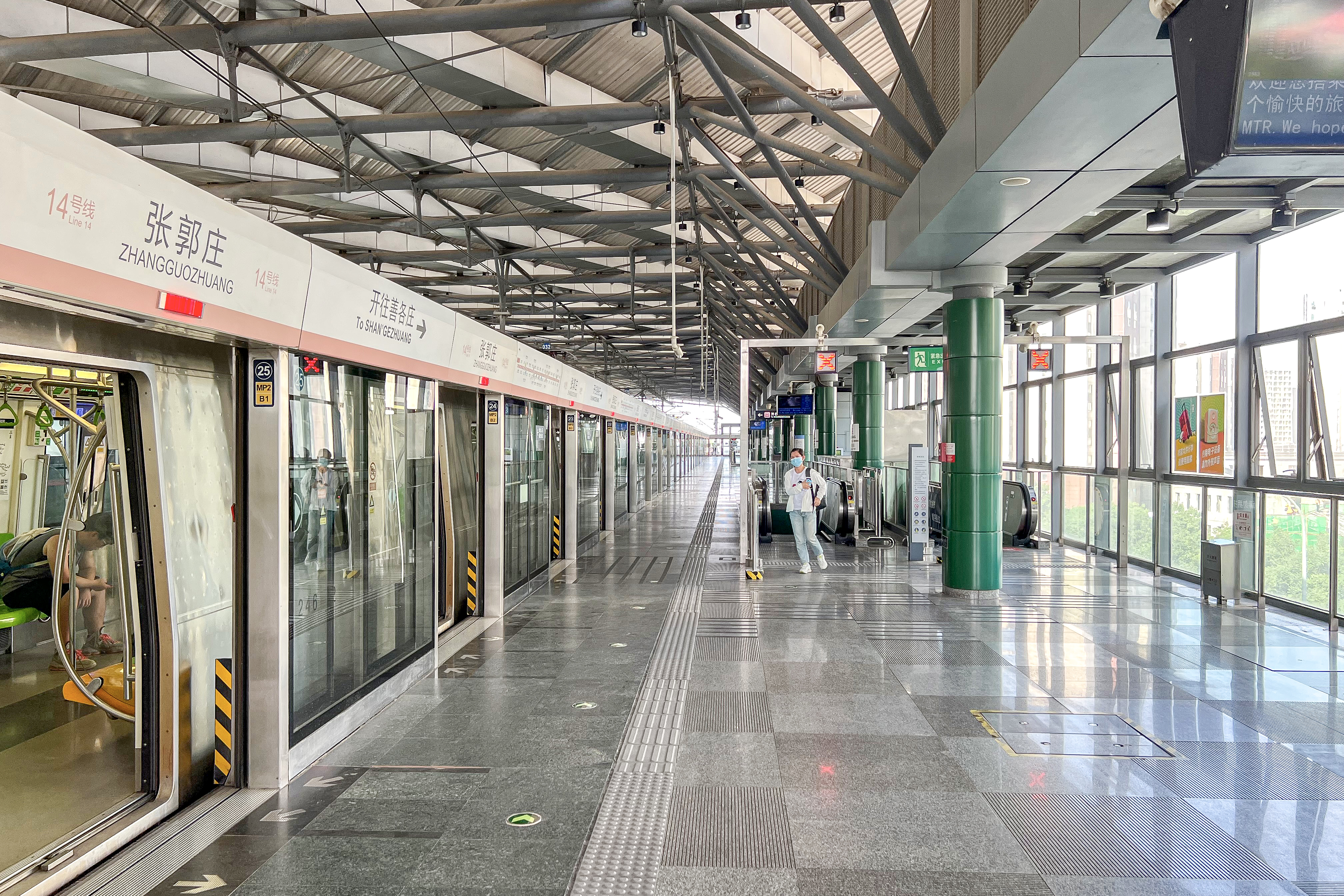
- Platform

General information
- Location: South Yuanboyuan Road (园博园南路); Changxindian Subdistrict, Fengtai District, Beijing; China
- Coordinates: 39°51′29″N 116°11′14″E
- Operator: Beijing MTR Corporation Limited
- Line: Line 14
- Platforms: 2 (2 side platforms)
- Tracks: 2

Construction
- Structure type: Elevated
- Accessible: Yes

History
- Opened: May 5, 2013

Services
Preceding station	Beijing Subway	Following station
Terminus	Line 14	Garden Expo Park towards Shangezhuang
Location
- Location within Beijing

Zhangguozhuang (simplified Chinese: 张郭庄站; traditional Chinese: 張郭莊站; pinyin: Zhāngguōzhuāng Zhàn) is a station on Line 14 of the Beijing Subway. It is the western terminus of Line 14. This station opened on May 5, 2013.

== Station layout ==
The station has 2 elevated side platforms.

== Exits ==
There are 2 exits, lettered A and B. Both are accessible.
