= Liuli Qiao station =

Beijing Subway interchange station

Liuli Qiao 六里桥
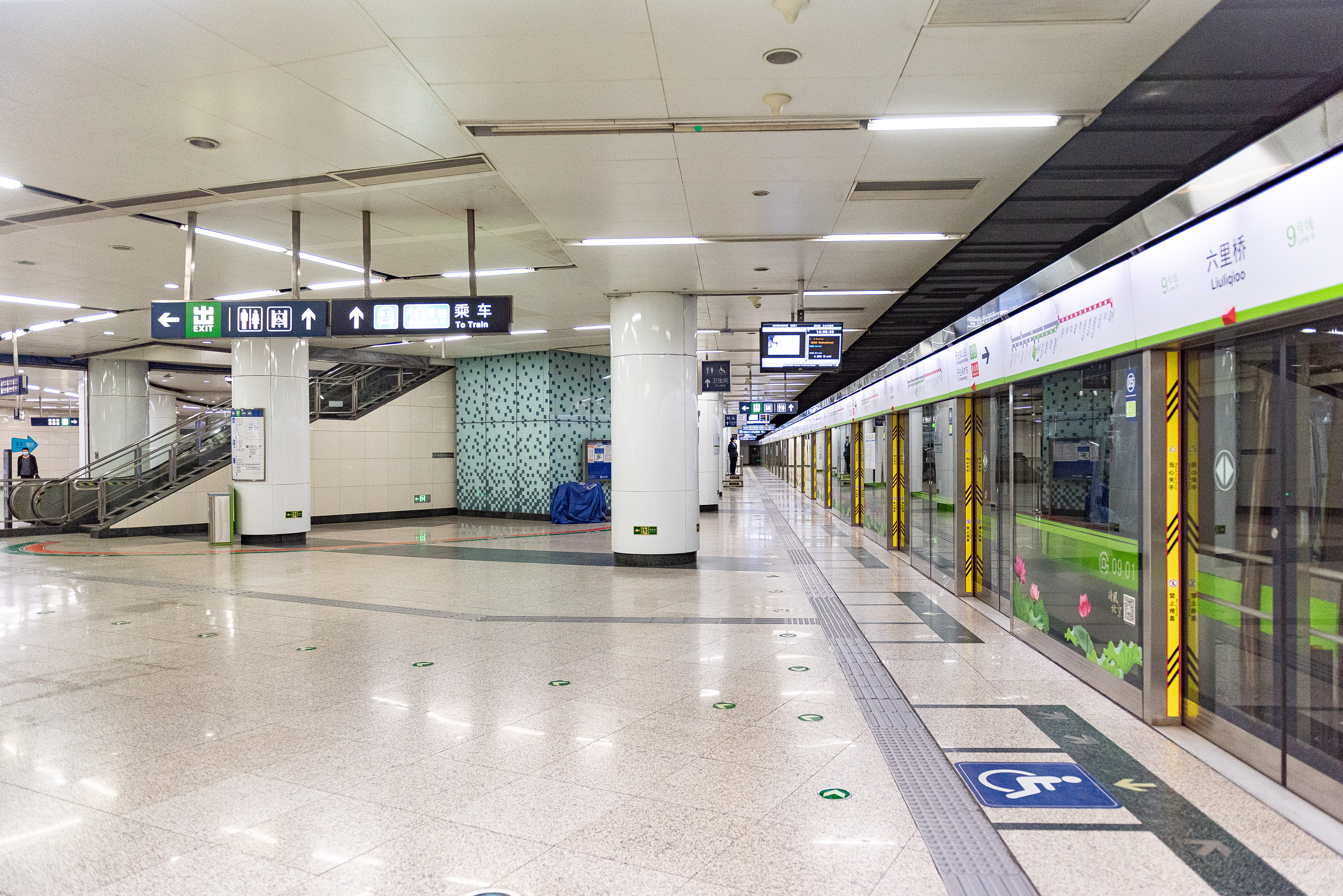
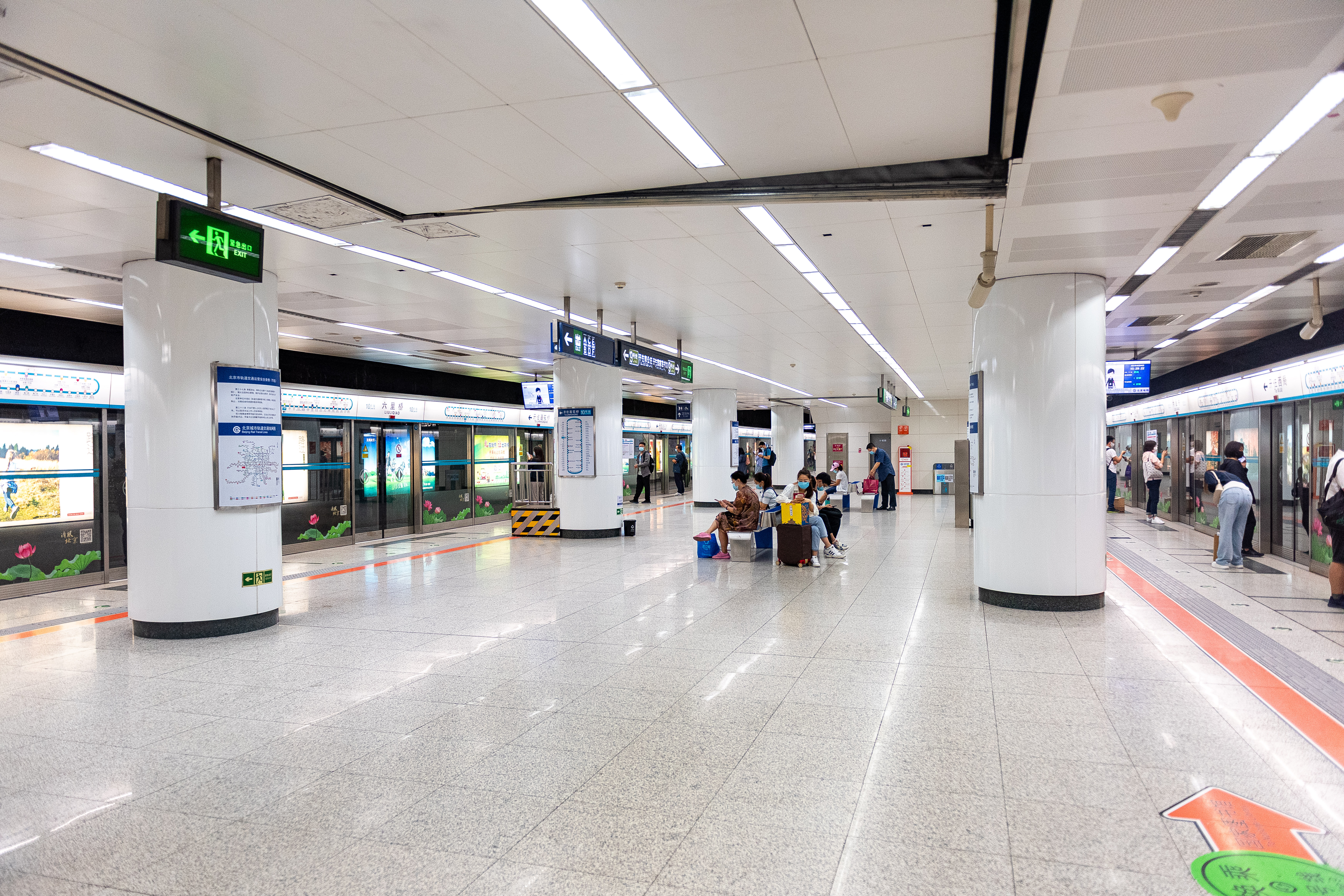
- Line 9 southbound platform with additional Fangshan Line route map Line 10 platform

General information
- Location: Guang'an Road (广安路) and Xiju West Road (西局西路); Fengtai District, Beijing; China
- Coordinates: 39°52′49″N 116°18′10″E
- Operator: Beijing Mass Transit Railway Operation Corporation Limited
- Lines: Line 9; Line 10; Fangshan line (through service to Line 9)
- Platforms: 4 (1 island platform and 2 side platforms)
- Tracks: 4

Construction
- Structure type: Underground
- Accessible: Yes

History
- Opened: December 31, 2011; 14 years ago (Line 9); December 30, 2012; 13 years ago (Line 10)

Services
Preceding station	Beijing Subway	Following station
Liuliqiaodong towards National Library	Line 9	Qilizhuang towards Guogongzhuang
Liuliqiaodong towards National Library	Fangshan line Through service (weekday peak only)	Qilizhuang towards Yancundong
Xiju outer loop / anticlockwise	Line 10	Lianhua Qiao inner loop / clockwise
Location
- Location within Beijing

Liuli Qiao station (simplified Chinese: 六里桥站; traditional Chinese: 六里橋站; pinyin: Liùlǐ Qiáo zhàn) is an interchange station on Line 9 and Line 10 of the Beijing Subway. It is located along Guang'an Road to the southwest of Liuliqiao, the intersection between the 3rd Ring Road and the northern terminus of the G4 Beijing–Hong Kong and Macau Expressway.

== Station layout ==
The line 9 station has 2 underground side platforms. The line 10 station has an underground island platform. The line 10 platforms are located under the line 9 platforms.

== Exits ==
There are 6 exits, lettered A, B, C, D, E, and F. Exit C is accessible.

== Gallery ==
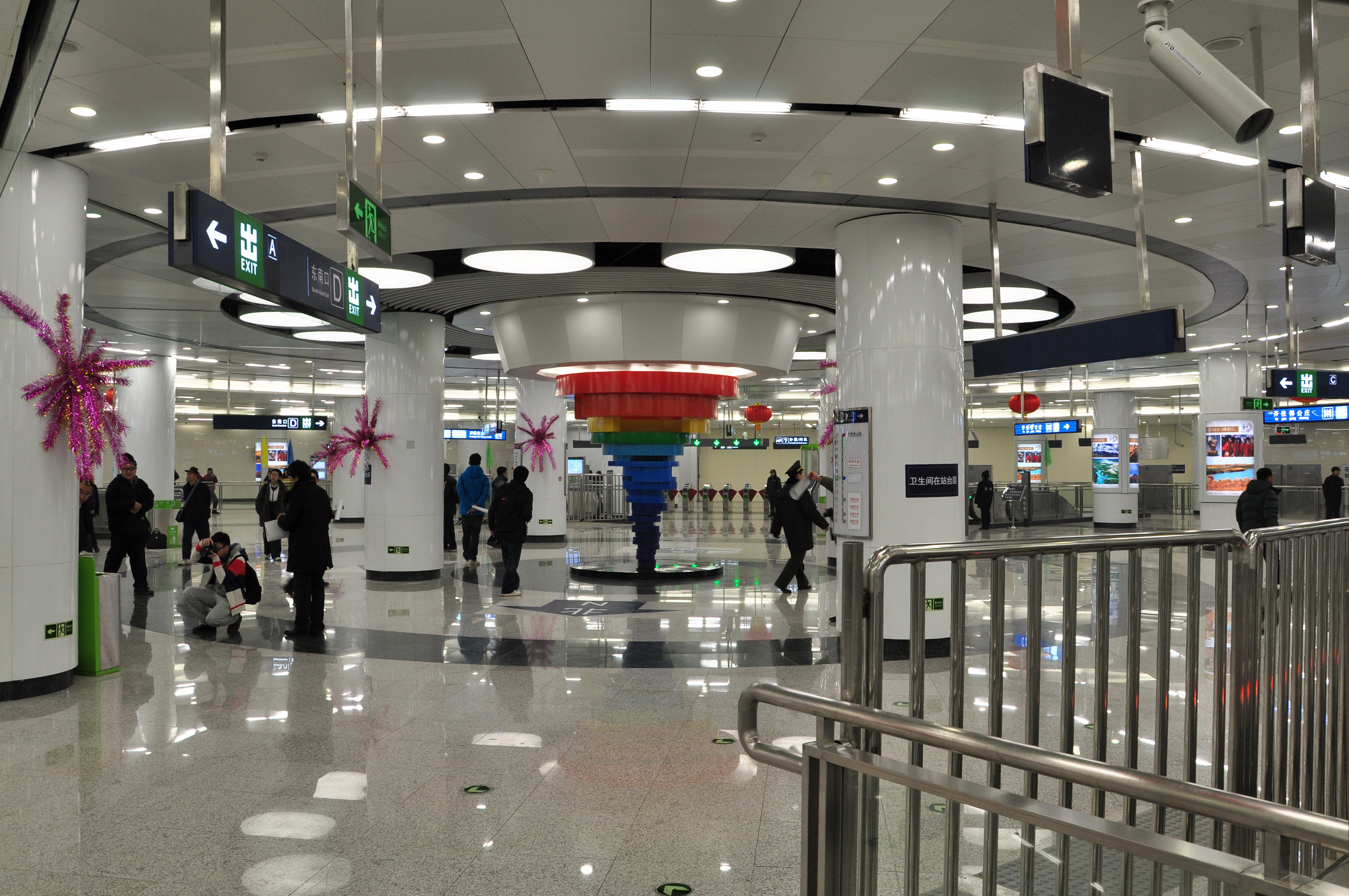
Concourse in 2011

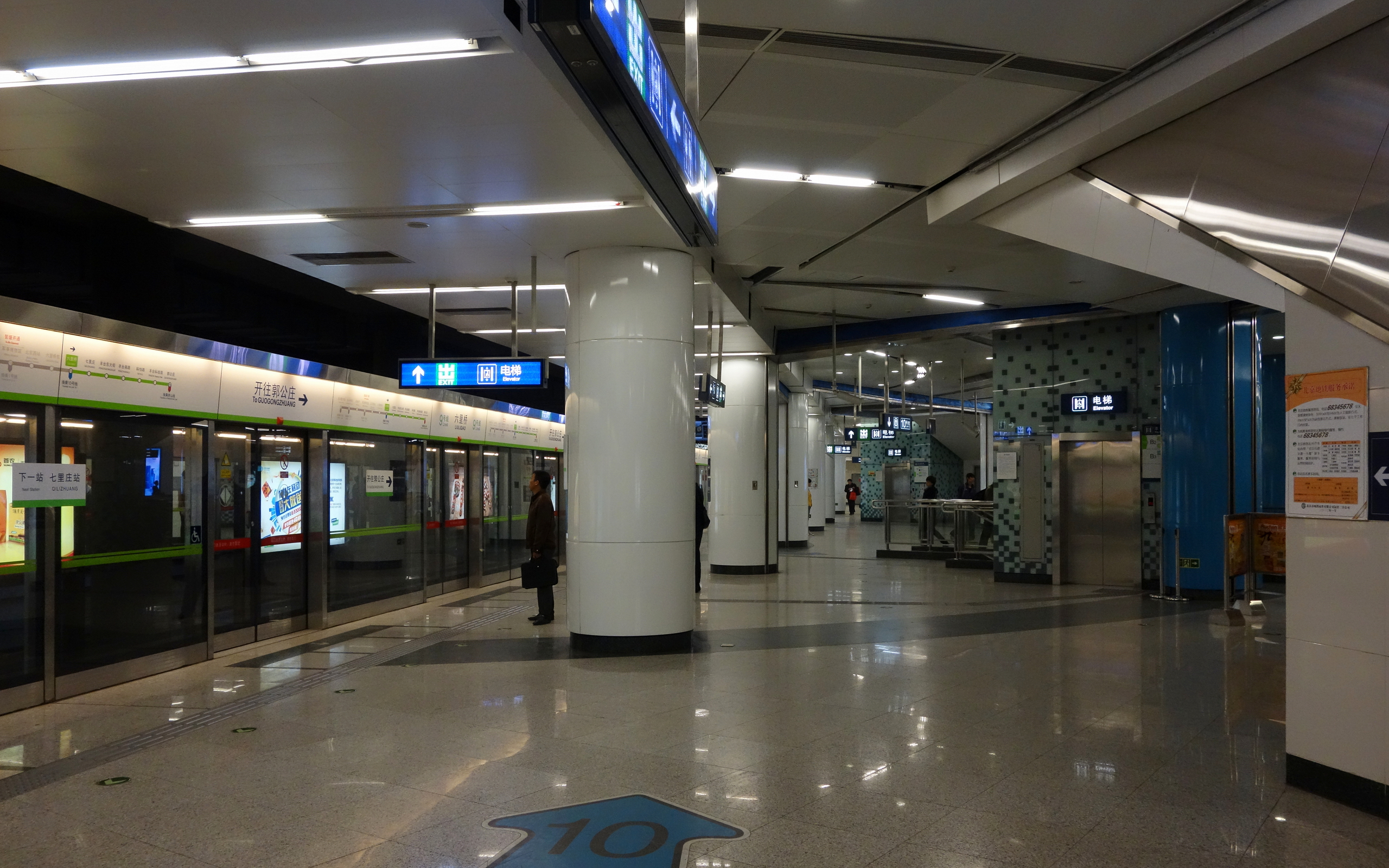
Line 9 platform in 2013

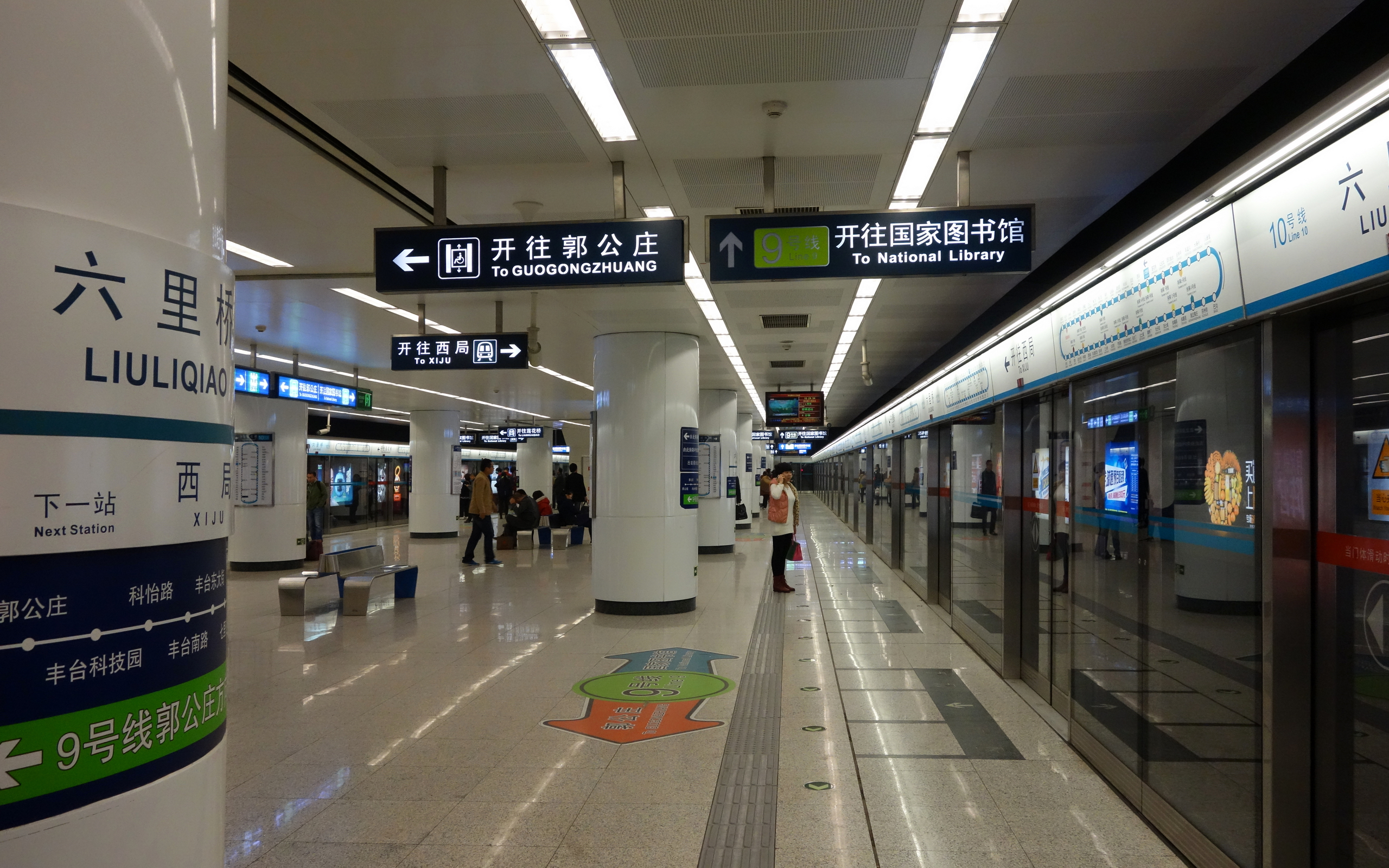
Line 10 platform in 2013

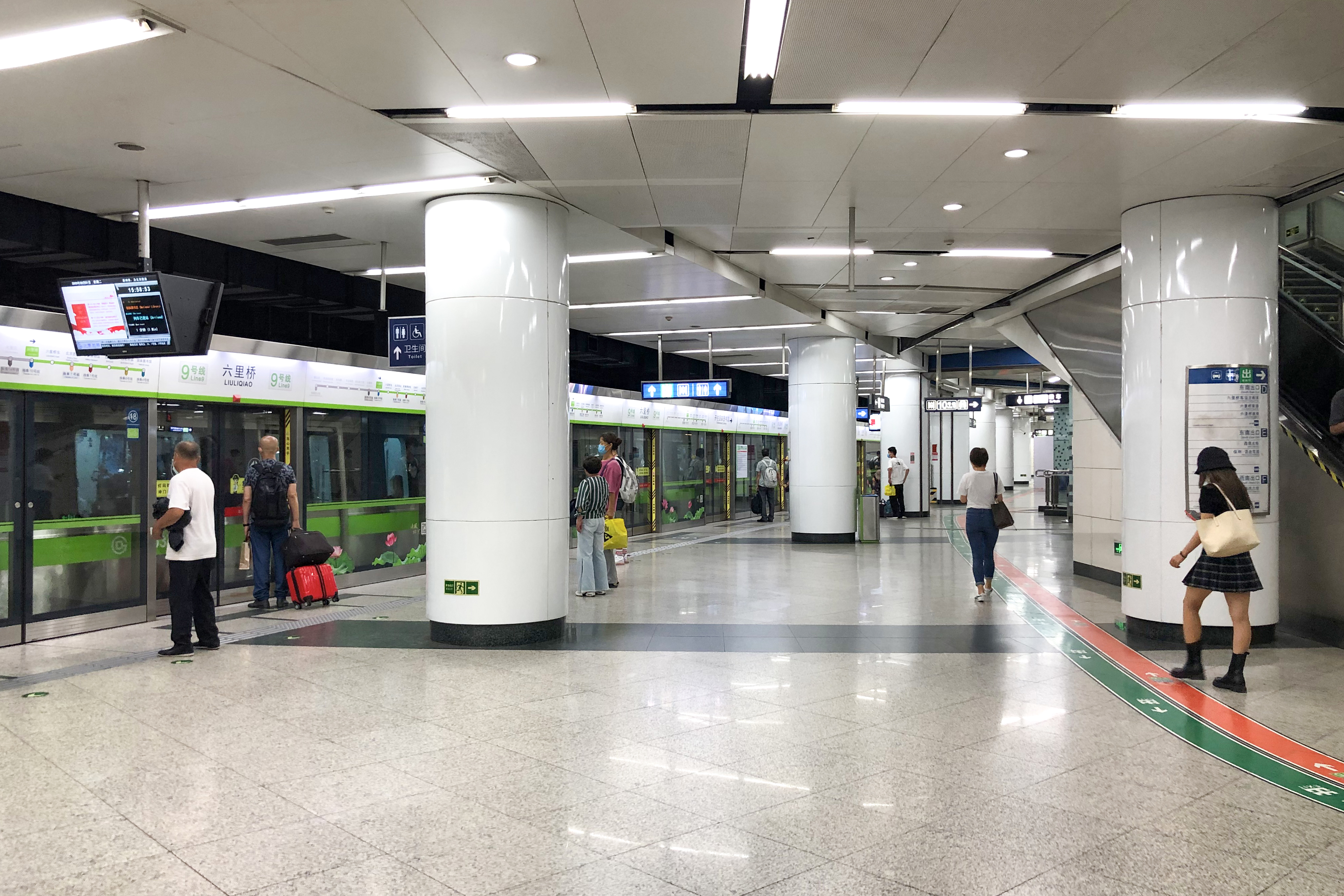
Line 9 northbound platform in 2020

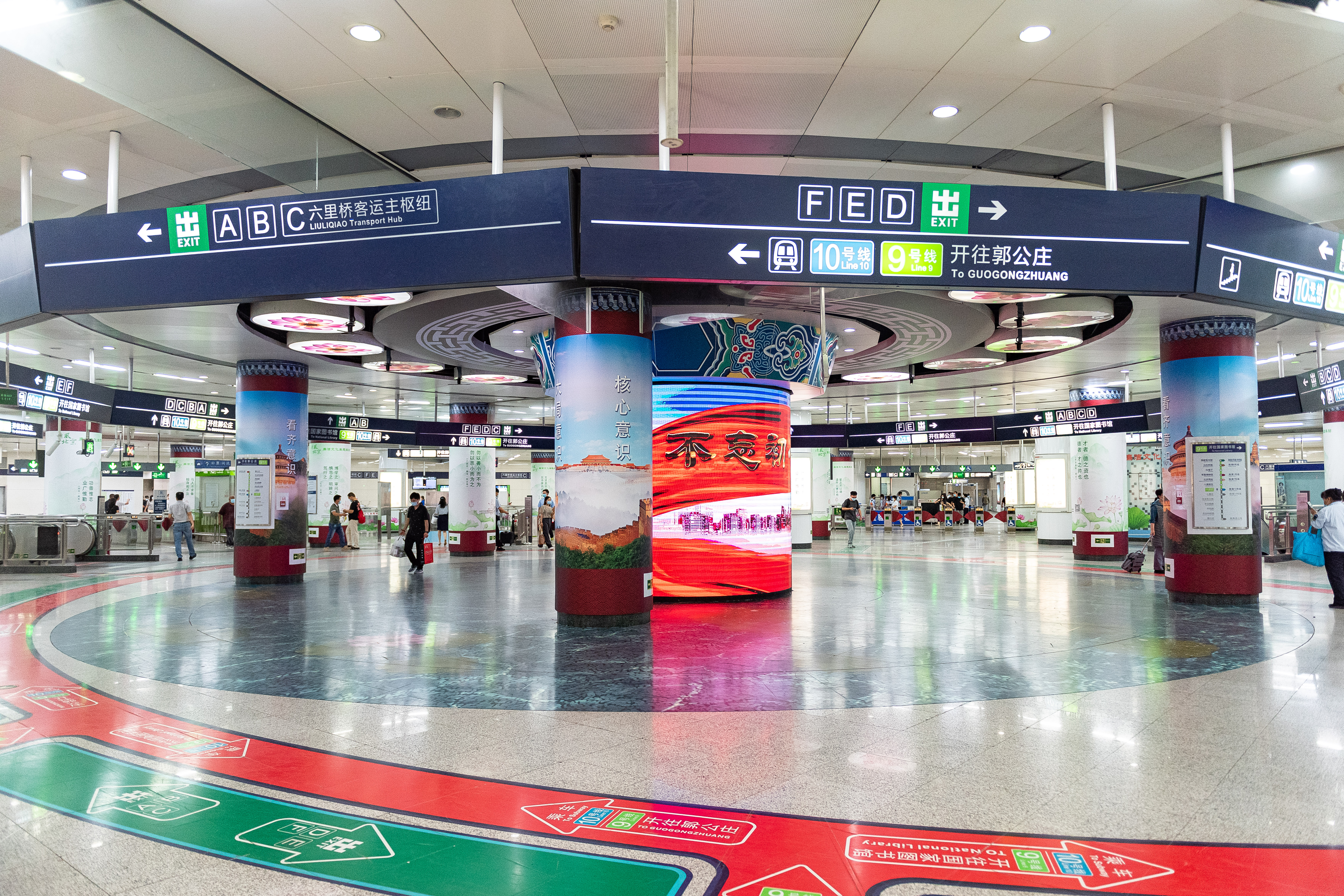
Concourse
