= Fengtai Nanlu station =

Beijing Subway Line 9 and Line 16 station

Coordinates: 39.8404°N 116.2967°E

Fengtai Nanlu 丰台南路
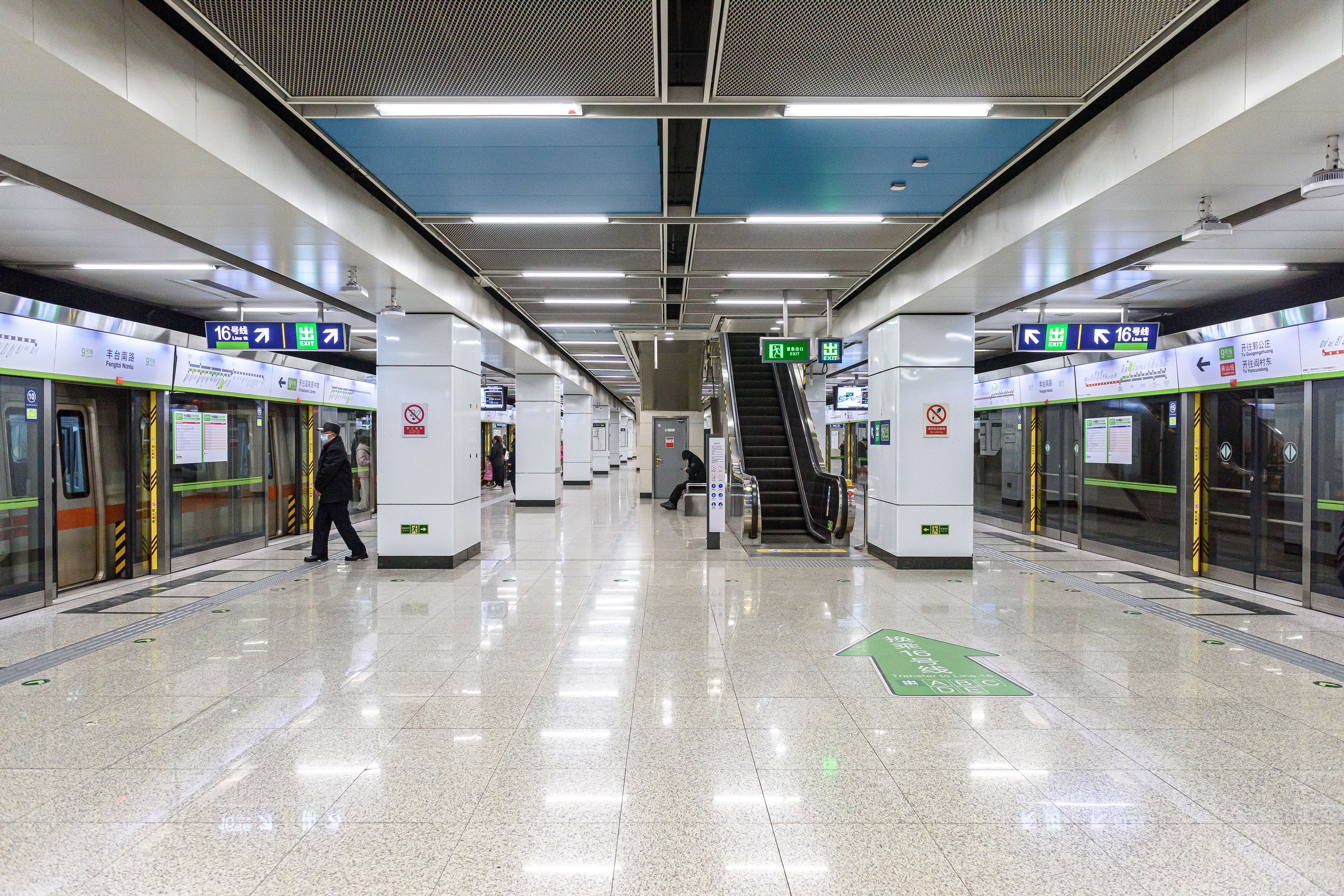
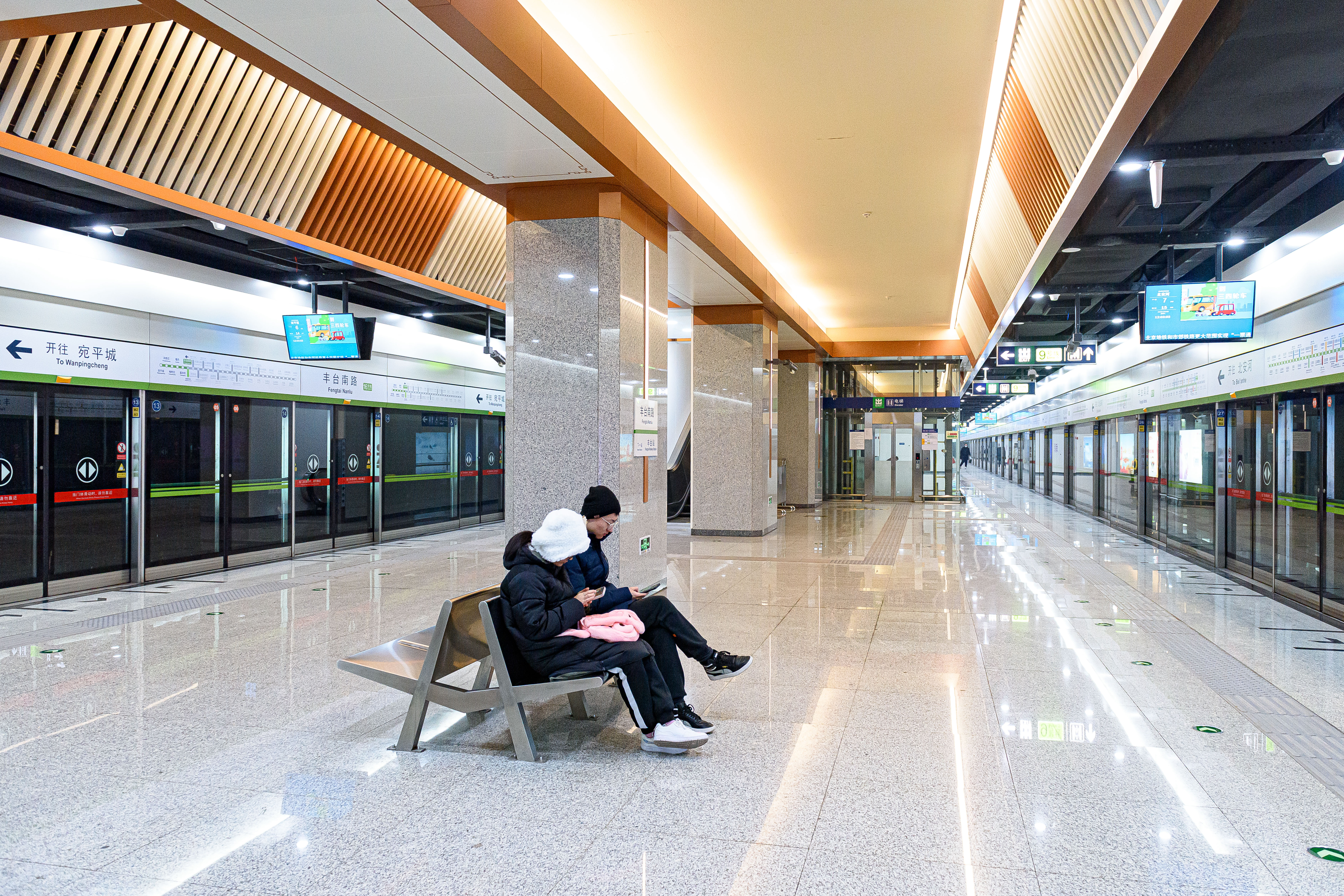
- Line 9 and Fangshan line (through service) platform Line 16 platform

General information
- Location: Fengtai District, Beijing; China
- Operator: Beijing Mass Transit Railway Operation Corporation Limited
- Lines: Line 9; Line 16; Fangshan line (through service to Line 9)
- Platforms: 4 (2 island platforms)
- Tracks: 4

Construction
- Structure type: Underground
- Accessible: Yes

History
- Opened: Line 9: December 31, 2011; 14 years ago; Line 16: December 31, 2022; 3 years ago

Services
Preceding station	Beijing Subway	Following station
Fengtai Dongdajie towards National Library	Line 9	Keyi Lu towards Guogongzhuang
Fengtai Dongdajie towards National Library	Fangshan line Through service (weekday peak only)	Keyi Lu towards Yancundong
Fengtai railway station towards Bei'anhe	Line 16	Fufengqiao towards Wanpingcheng
Location
- Location within Beijing

Fengtai Nanlu station (simplified Chinese: 丰台南路站; traditional Chinese: 豐台南路站; pinyin: Fēngtái Nánlù zhàn; lit. 'Fengtai South Road station') is an interchange station between Line 9 and Line 16 of the Beijing Subway. Line 9 opened on December 31, 2011, whilst Line 16 opened on December 31, 2022. The platform for line 16 is parallel to the current platform of line 9. Weekday peak through service of Fangshan line to Line 9 started on January 18, 2023.

== Station layout ==
Both the line 9 and line 16 stations have underground island platforms. There are 7 exits, lettered A1, A2, B1, B2, C, D and E. Exits A1 and B2 are accessible via elevators.

== Gallery ==
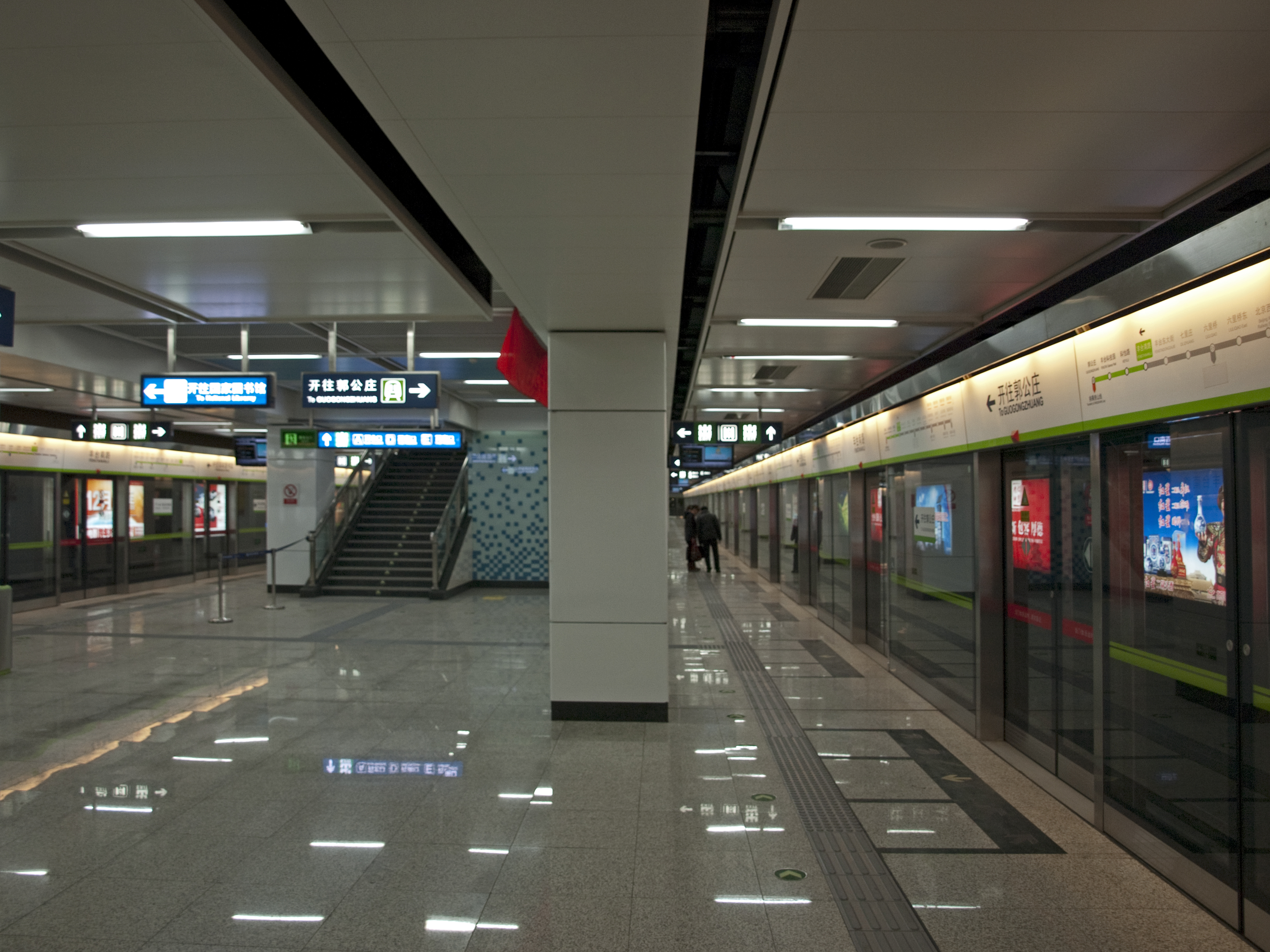
Line 9 platform in 2012, only one year after opening

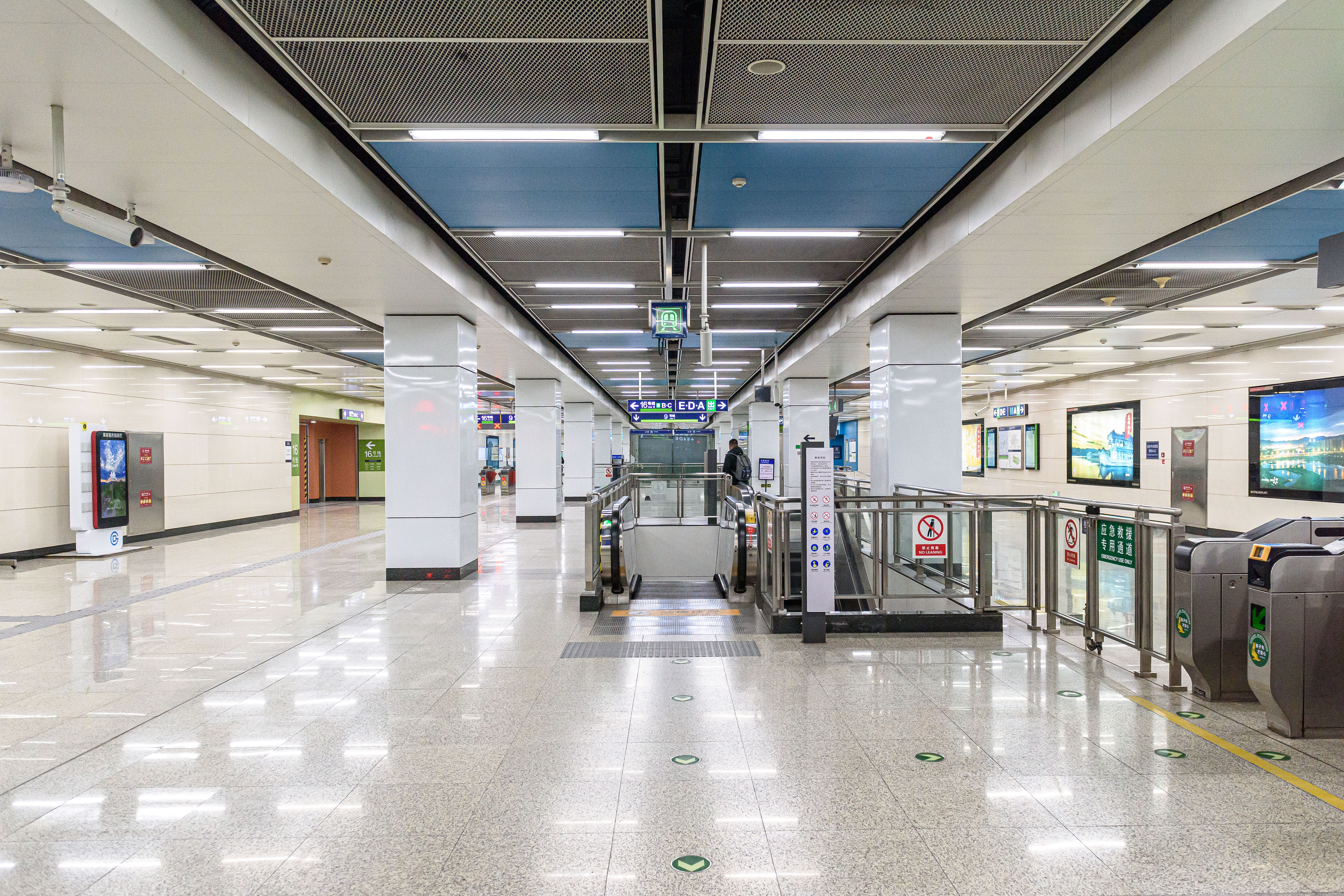
Line 9 concourse

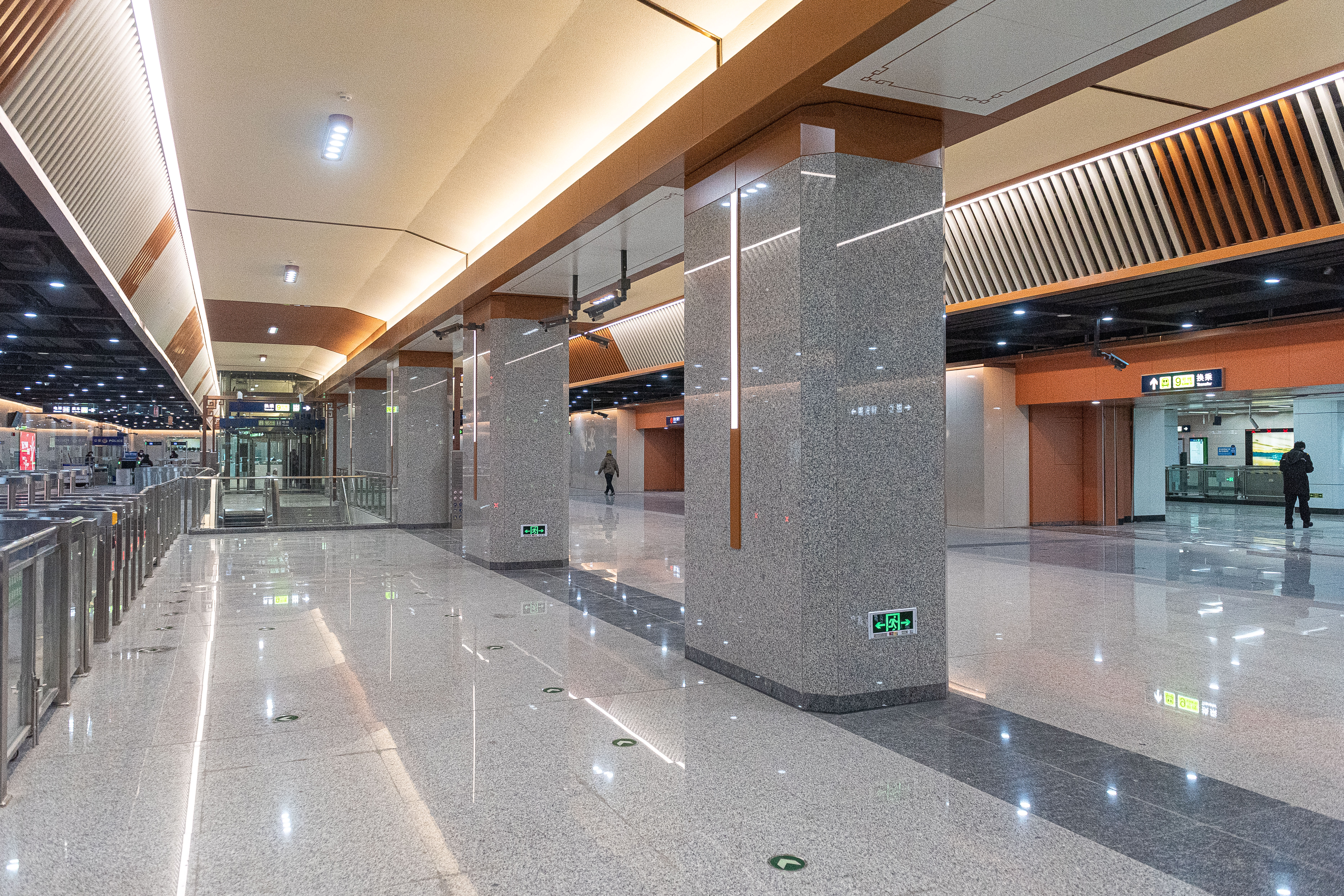
Line 16 concourse
