= Liuliqiaodong station =

Beijing Subway station

Coordinates: 39.8871°N 116.3158°E

Liuliqiaodong 六里桥东
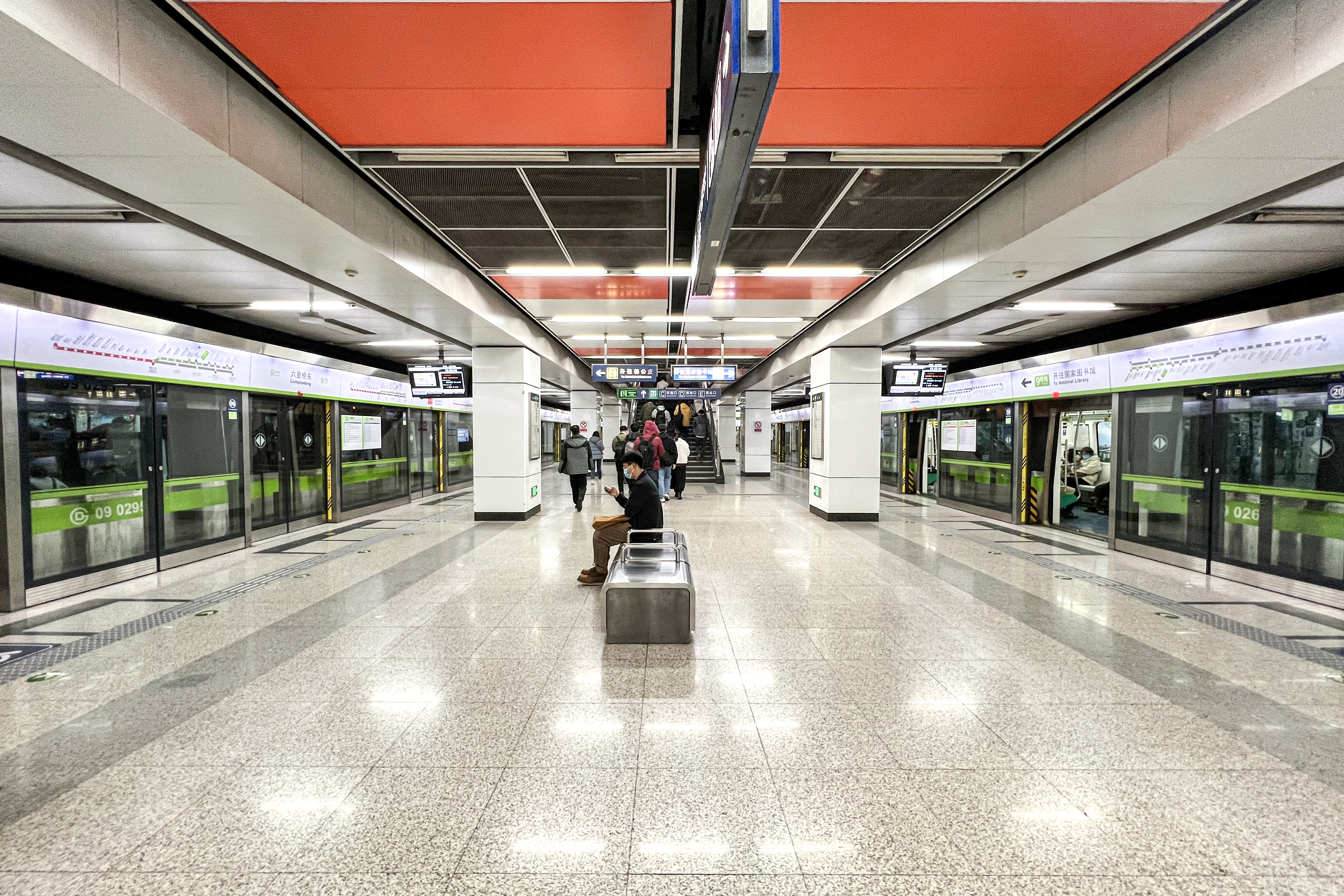
- Platform

General information
- Location: Guang'an Road (广安路); Fengtai District, Beijing; China
- Operator: Beijing Mass Transit Railway Operation Corporation Limited
- Lines: Line 9 Fangshan line (through service)
- Platforms: 2 (1 island platform)
- Tracks: 2

Construction
- Structure type: Underground
- Accessible: Yes

History
- Opened: December 31, 2011

Services
Preceding station	Beijing Subway	Following station
Beijing West railway station towards National Library	Line 9	Liuliqiao towards Guogongzhuang
Beijing West railway station towards National Library	Fangshan line Through service (weekday peak only)	Liuliqiao towards Yancundong
Location
- Location within Beijing

Liuliqiaodong (simplified Chinese: 六里桥东站; traditional Chinese: 六里橋東站; pinyin: Liùlǐqiáo Dōng Zhàn) is a station on Line 9 of the Beijing Subway. It is located along Guang'an Road to the northeast of Liuliqiao, the intersection between the 3rd Ring Road and the northern terminus of the G4 Beijing–Hong Kong and Macau Expressway.

== Station layout ==
The station has an underground island platform.

== Exits ==
There are 3 exits, lettered C, D, and E. Exit C is accessible.
