= Keyi Lu station =

Beijing Subway station

Keyi Lu 科怡路
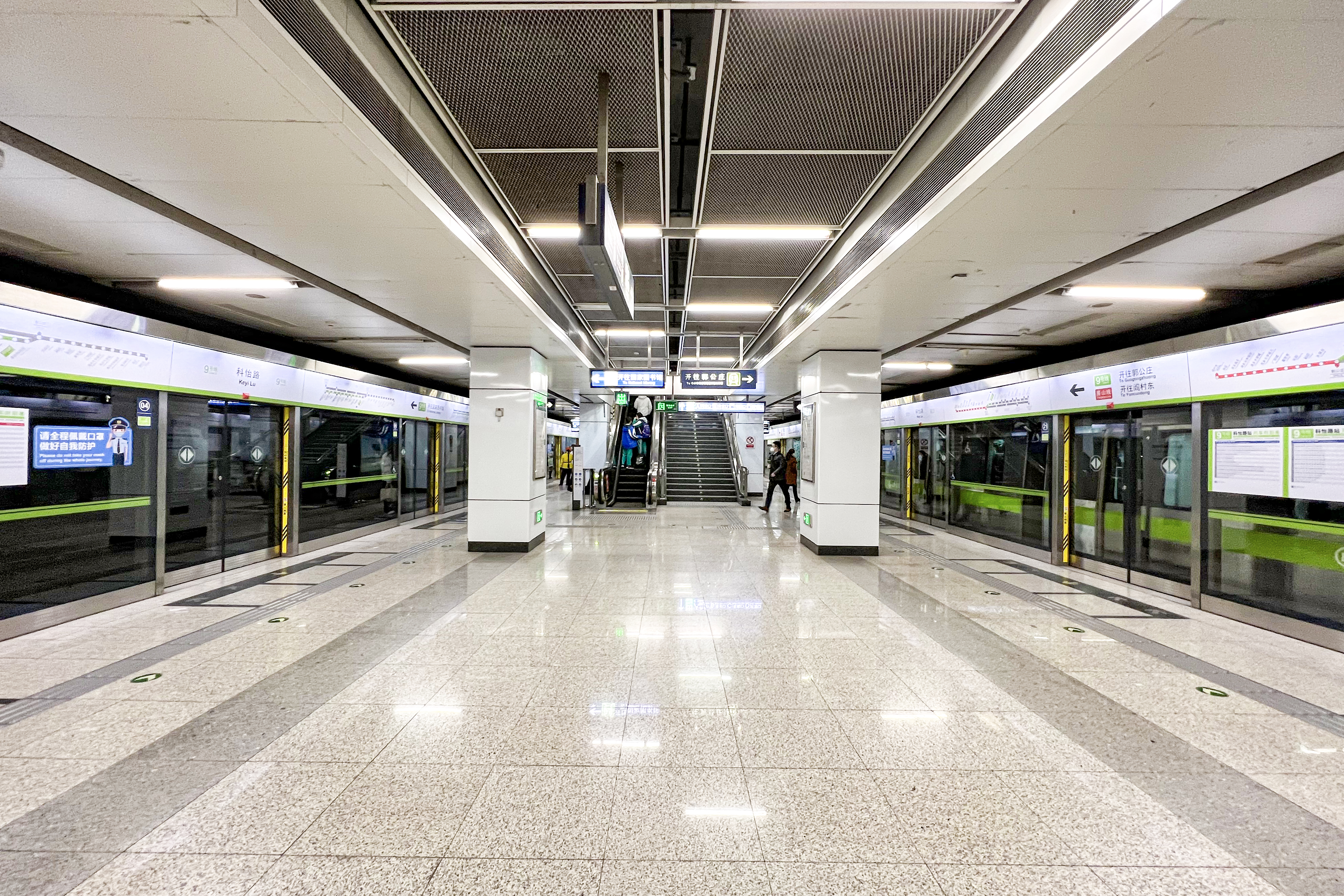
- Platform with additional Fangshan Line directory signs

General information
- Location: Keyi Road (科怡路); Fengtai District, Beijing; China
- Coordinates: 39.8324°N 116.2976°E
- Operator: Beijing Mass Transit Railway Operation Corporation Limited
- Lines: Line 9 Fangshan line (through service)
- Platforms: 2 (1 island platform)
- Tracks: 2

Construction
- Structure type: Underground
- Accessible: Yes

History
- Opened: December 31, 2011; 14 years ago

Services
Preceding station	Beijing Subway	Following station
Fengtai Nanlu towards National Library	Line 9	Fengtai Science Park towards Guogongzhuang
Fengtai Nanlu towards National Library	Fangshan line Through service (weekday peak only)	Fengtai Science Park towards Yancundong
Location
- Location within Beijing

Keyi Lu (Chinese: 科怡路站; pinyin: Kēyí Lù Zhàn) is a station on Line 9 of the Beijing Subway. It is located along the north-south Keyi Road just north of the South 4th Ring Road West.

== Station layout ==
The station has an underground island platform.

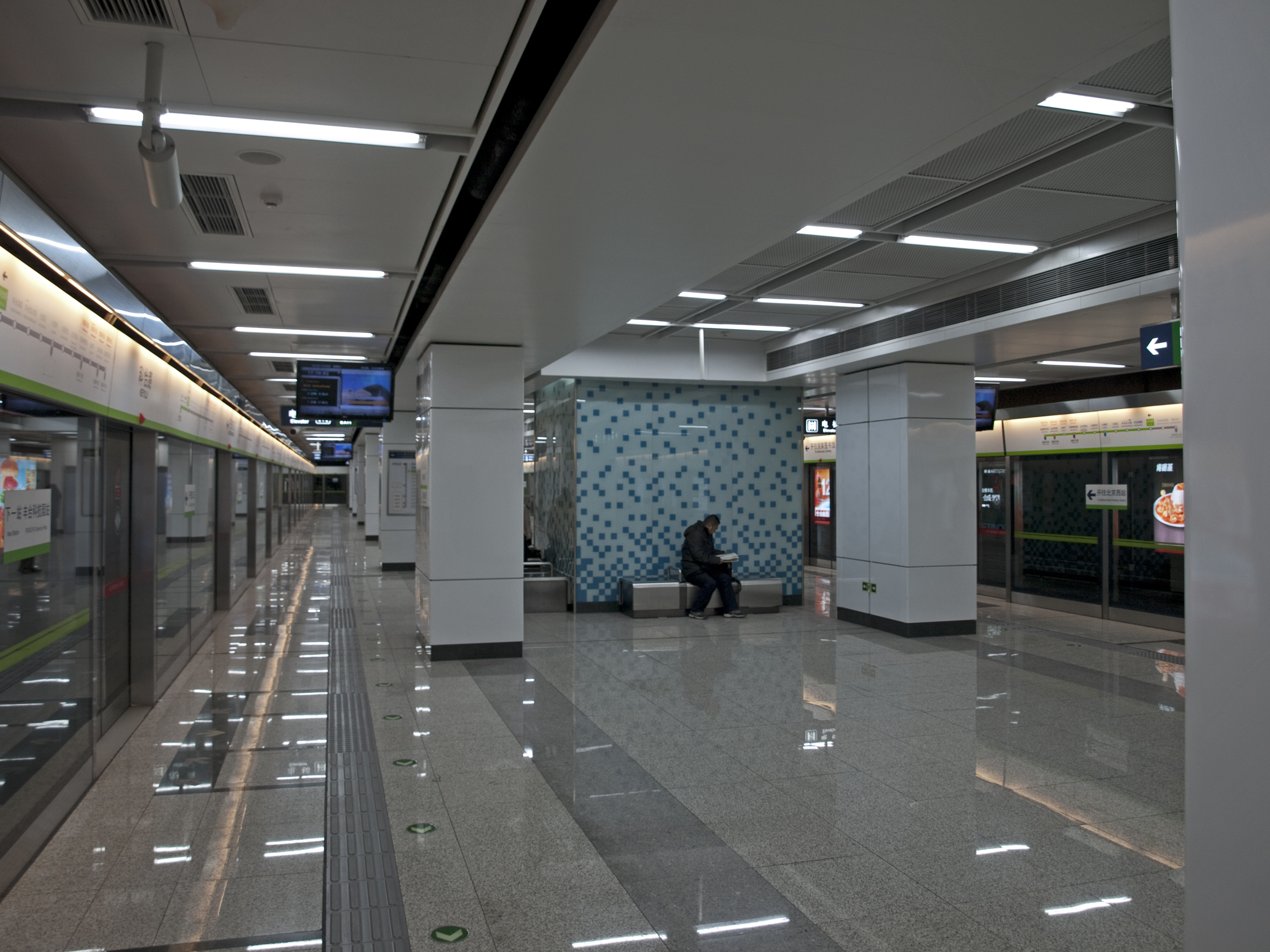
Platform with Line 9 markings only

== Exits ==
There are 4 exits, lettered A, B, C, and D. Exits A and C are accessible.
