= Fengtai Dongdajie station =

Beijing Subway station

Coordinates: 39.8551°N 116.2938°E

Fengtai Dongdajie 丰台东大街
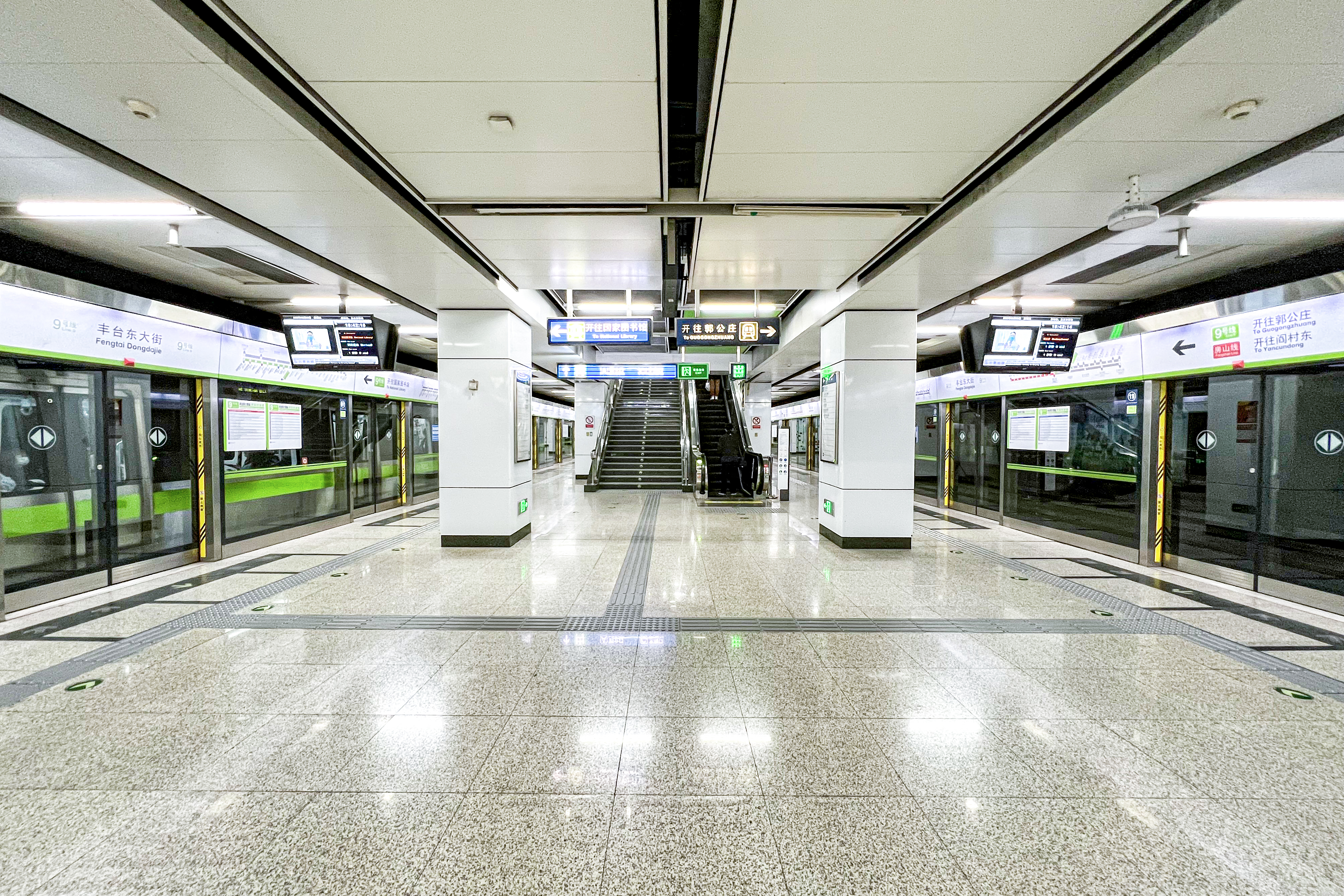
- Platform

General information
- Location: Intersection of East Street and Youyongchang North Road; Fengtai District, Beijing; China
- Operator: Beijing Mass Transit Railway Operation Corporation Limited
- Lines: Line 9 Fangshan line (through service)
- Platforms: 2 (1 island platform)
- Tracks: 2

Construction
- Structure type: Underground
- Accessible: Yes

History
- Opened: October 12, 2012; 13 years ago

Services
Preceding station	Beijing Subway	Following station
Qilizhuang towards National Library	Line 9	Fengtai Nanlu towards Guogongzhuang
Qilizhuang towards National Library	Fangshan line Through service (weekday peak only)	Fengtai Nanlu towards Yancundong
Location
- Location within Beijing

Fengtai Dongdajie station (simplified Chinese: 丰台东大街站; traditional Chinese: 豐台東大街站; pinyin: Fēngtái Dōngdàjiē zhàn; lit. 'Fengtai East Street station') is a station on Line 9 of the Beijing Subway.

The station was opened on October 12, 2012. Prior to that date, the trains did not stop there.

== Station layout ==
The station has an underground island platform.

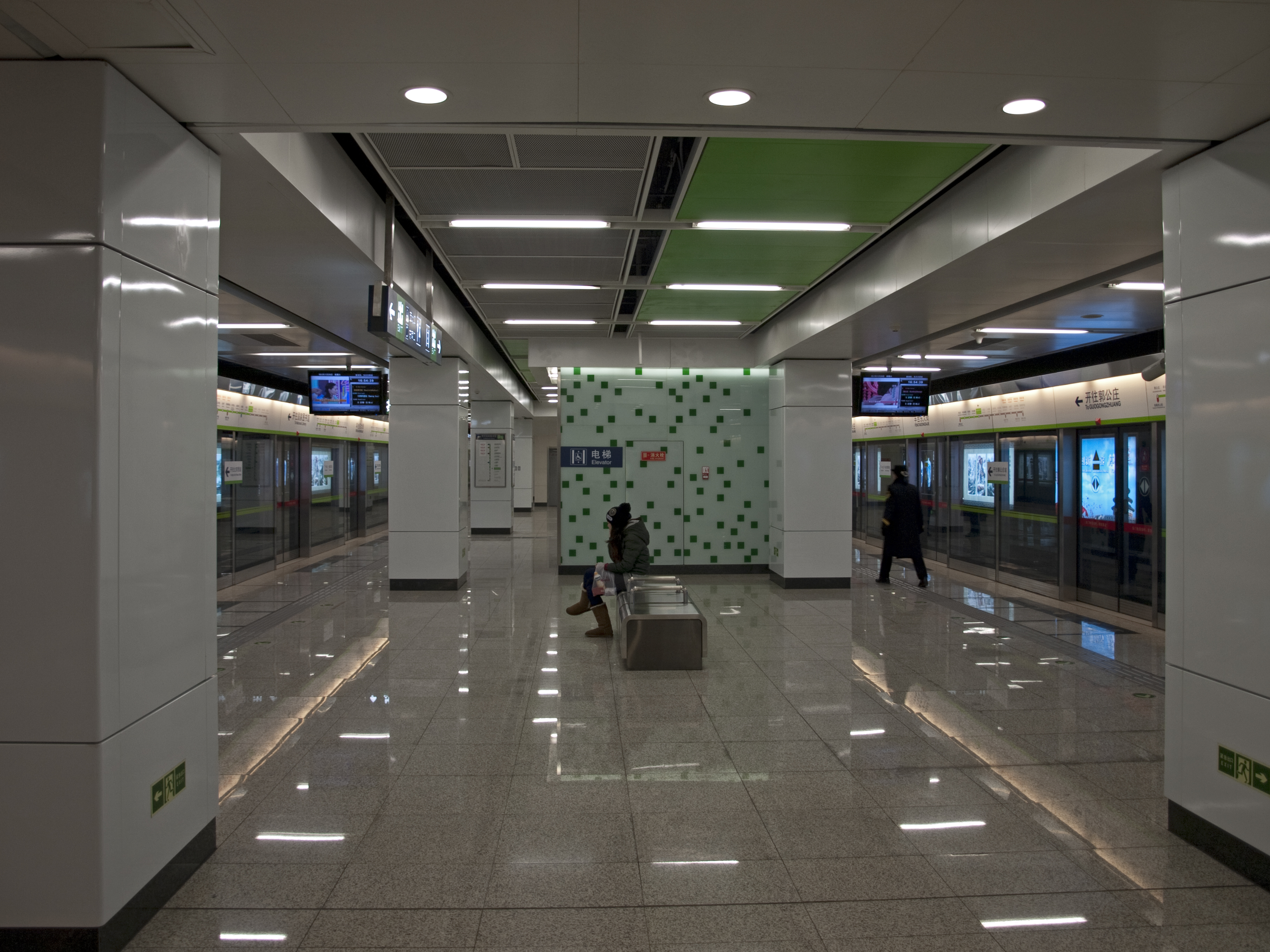
Platform with old spelling

== Exits ==
There are 2 exits, lettered A and C. Exit C is accessible.
