= Fengtai Science Park station =

Beijing Subway station

Coordinates: 39.8253°N 116.2970°E

Fengtai Science Park 丰台科技园
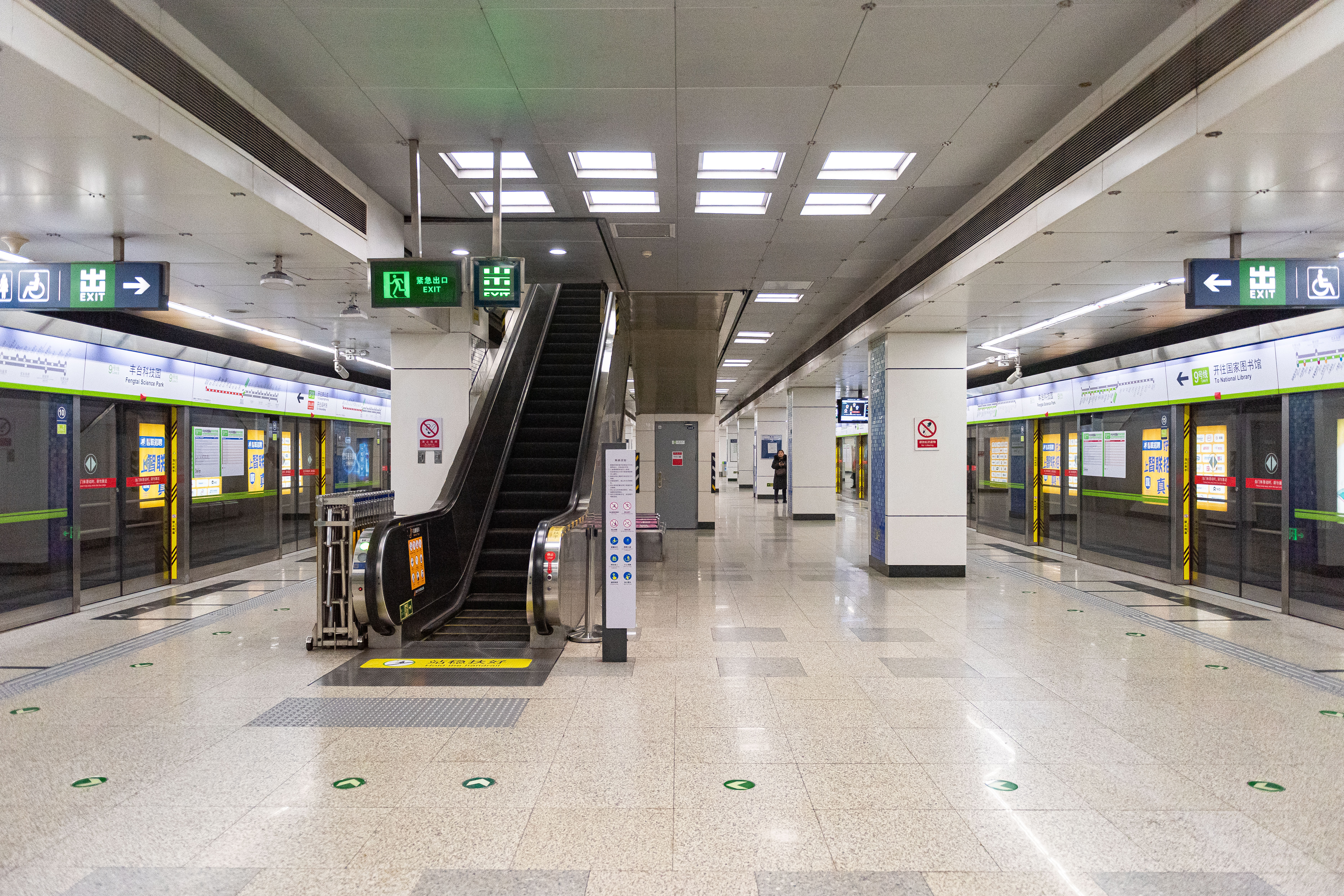
- Platform

General information
- Location: Fengke Road (丰科路) and Fengmao Road (丰茂路); Fengtai District, Beijing; China
- Operator: Beijing Mass Transit Railway Operation Corporation Limited
- Lines: Line 9 Fangshan line (through service)
- Platforms: 2 (1 island platform)
- Tracks: 2

Construction
- Structure type: Underground
- Accessible: Yes

History
- Opened: December 31, 2011

Services
| Preceding station | Beijing Subway | Following station |
|---|---|---|
| Keyi Lu towards National Library | Line 9 | Guogongzhuang Terminus |
| Keyi Lu towards National Library | Fangshan line Through service (weekday peak only) | Guogongzhuang towards Yancundong |
Location
- Location within Beijing

Fengtai Science Park station (simplified Chinese: 丰台科技园站; traditional Chinese: 豐台科技園站; pinyin: Fēngtái Kējì Yuán zhàn) is a station on Line 9 of the Beijing Subway.

== Station layout ==
The station has an underground island platform.

== Exits ==
There are 4 exits, lettered A, B, C, and D. Exit D is accessible.
