= Line 9 (Beijing Subway) =

Metro line in Beijing, China

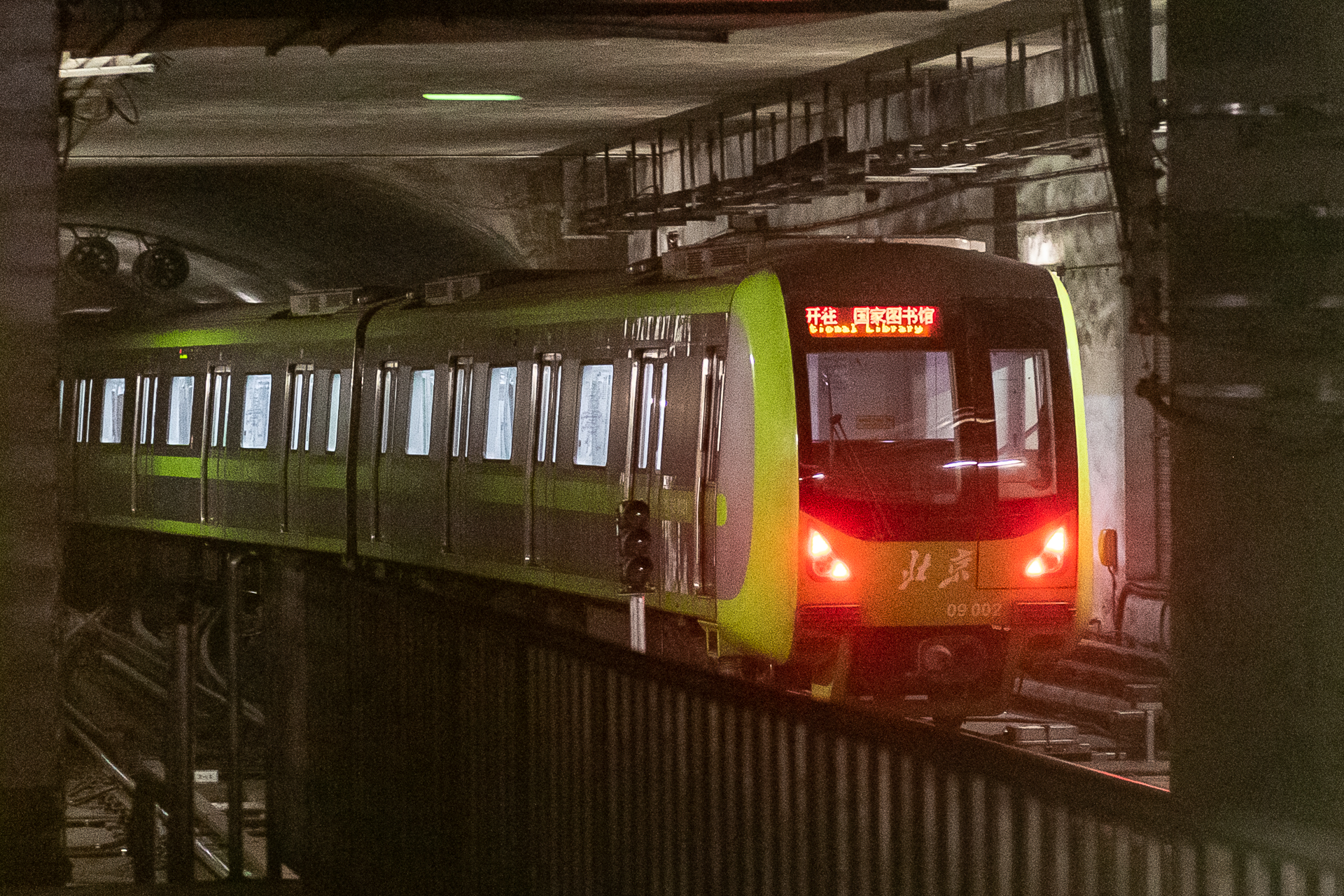
- A Line 9 train reversing at National Library station in January 2021

Overview
- Other name: M9 (planned name)
- Status: Operational
- Locale: Fengtai and Haidian districts Beijing
- Termini: National Library; Guogongzhuang
- Stations: 13

Service
- Type: Rapid transit
- System: Beijing Subway
- Operator: Beijing Mass Transit Railway Operation Corp., Ltd
- Depot: Guogongzhuang
- Rolling stock: 6-car Type B (DKZ33)
- Daily ridership: 372,000 (2024 Avg.)

History
- Opened: December 31, 2011; 14 years ago

Technical
- Line length: 16.5 km (10.3 mi)
- Character: Underground
- Track gauge: 1,435 mm (4 ft 8 1/2 in) standard gauge
- Electrification: 750 V DC Third rail
- Operating speed: 80 km/h (50 mph)

Line 9 of the Beijing Subway (Chinese: 北京地铁9号线; pinyin: běijīng dìtiě jiǔhào xiàn) is a rapid transit line in western Beijing. The line runs 16.5 km (10.3 mi) from the National Library in Haidian District to Guogongzhuang in Fengtai District with 13 stations. All stations are fully underground. Line 9's color is chartreuse.

== History ==
Line 9's route drawn to scale.

In 1989, the State Council decided to build Beijing West railway station on the Beijing-Kowloon railway. Subway planning had determined that Beijing West railway station would be the interchange between Lines 7 and 9. However, no provision for an interchange station was added in the railway station's design. The railway station was completed in 1996. 15 years later Beijing West Station was rebuilt and expanded with provisions added to the basement of the station for Lines 7 and 9. In 2002, in preparation for the 2008 Beijing Olympics, it was proposed that the first section of Line 9 should be built between Baishiqiao and Beijing West railway station (today's National Library to Beijing West railway station section). The entire length of the proposed line was 5.8 kilometers (3.6 mi). However, the line only started construction in April 2007, with a planned opening date of 2010 and the original northern section between Baishiqiao to Beijing West Station was further delayed until 2012, making an opening before the Olympics unlikely. In the meantime, planners were investigating the possibility of extending Line 9 northwest beyond Baishiqiao and roughly paralleling the almost complete Line 4. However, this Baishiqiao-Wenyang Road Project would head further north to the Haidan area, terminating around the Wenyang Road (温阳路) exit of the 6th Ring Road competing with another proposal where Line 4's northern extension would serve the area. The extension project was would be 25.5 km (15.8 mi) long and add 13 new stations, creating a 40.7 km (25.3 mi) long Line 9. However, this project was cut back to the current terminus at National Library Station with the remaining northern sections ultimately redesigned as neither Line 9 or Line 4 but replaced by Line 16.

On December 31, 2011, the 11.1 km (6.9 mi) nine-station southern section from Guogongzhuang to Beijing West railway station opened. At the time, the line was only connected to the Fangshan Line, isolated from the rest of the Beijing Subway network. Passengers had to transfer to shuttle buses that connected to the main subway network to continue their journey, making the line sparsely used in 2011. The situation did not improve on April 29, 2012, when the Beijing subway exceeded a record 8 million daily riders, with the daily ridership of Line 9 being only 46,300 as it was still isolated from the rest of the network.

After replacement of the Baishiqiao-Wenyang Road Project with Line 16, another proposal was made around 2011 to extend Line 9 north. This time Line 9 would be extended north forming a north–south corridor just west of Line 13 with an interchange with the proposed Line 15 western extension at Xueyuan Road Station. The extension would terminate at Xi'erqi station and help relieve the congestion on the western arc of Line 13 and more directly serve Tsinghua University.

On December 30, 2012, the original northern section from the Beijing West railway station to the National Library entered into operation. This finally connected Line 9 and the Fangshan Line to the rest of the subway network and made all major Beijing train stations accessible by subway. The underground connections for the transfer between Line 9 and Line 1 were not completed at the opening of the Line 9 extension. Between December 2012 and December 2013, Line 9 skipped Military Museum station. Line 9's passenger traffic began to grow rapidly after the northern section went into operation. In January 2013, the average daily passenger traffic was already three times higher than in December 2012, at 220,000 rides. The Line 1 to Line 9 transfer was completed at the Military Museum Station on December 21, 2013.

In 2013, the northern extension proposal was modified again. While still a line connecting National Library to Xi'erqi, the line was now shifted to swing east of Line 13. Later, it was decided that this northern extension project will be divided into two lines at Mingguangqiao West Station. The Southern portion of Mingguangqiao West Station to the National Library Station will still be the north extension line of Line 9. However, the section between Mingguangqiao West Station north to Xi'erqi Station will be replaced by the southern extension of the Changping line. However, only the south extension project of the Changping Line from Xi'erqi to Jimenqiao Stations actually started construction, with the last remaining section of the Changping Line's south extension to Mingguangqiao West Station and the entire northern extension section of Line 9 (Mingguangqiao West to National Library Station) put on hold. Also, during that time it was proposed that Line 9 be extended south beyond Guogongzhuang along the west side of Daxing New Town to the Biomedical Base station, with a total length of 18 kilometers (11 mi) and 8 stations.

Segment	Commencement	Length	Station(s)	Name
Beijing West Railway Station — Guogongzhuang	31 December 2011	5.349 km (3.32 mi)	8	(southern section)
Fengtai Dongdajie	12 October 2012	Infill station	1	
National Library — Beijing West Railway Station	30 December 2012	10.282 km (6.39 mi)	3	(northern section)
Military Museum	21 December 2013	Infill station	1	

== List of Stations ==
Service Route		Station Name		Connections	Nearby Bus Stops	Distance km		Location
L	Ex	English	Chinese	Connections	Nearby Bus Stops	Distance km		Location
●	●	Guojia Tushuguan (National Library)	国家图书馆	4 16	56 86 92 129 305 320 332 481 609 653 658 695 夜8	0.000	0.000	Haidian
●	●	Baishiqiaonan	白石桥南	6	4 27 61 86 92 114 118 320 653 693 夜3	1.096	1.096	Haidian
●	●	Baiduizi	白堆子		10 61 92 121 612 686 BRT4(快速公交4) 夜13	0.943	2.039	Haidian
●	●	Military Museum	军事博物馆	1	1 1区 21 40 52 68 78 85 94 308 414 夜1 夜5 夜8 专7	1.912	3.951	Haidian
●	●	Beijing West railway station	北京西站	7 Sub-Central BXP	3 9 21 40 50 52 53 62 67 89 109 122 129 142 143 144 309 320 339 387 394 410 414 616 663 820 836 890 890区 917 917快 941 941快 968 982 997 快速直达专线52 夜5 夜8 夜23 夜36 专7 专138 专191	1.398	5.349	Fengtai
●	｜	Liuliqiaodong	六里桥东		6 38 57 69 74 76 133 134 137 309 321 349 390 477 820 832 835 836 890 890区 895 917 917快 941 941快 968 971 982 998 快速直达专线3 快速直达专线11 快速直达专线86 快速直达专线115 快速直达专线154 夜7 专3	1.170	6.519	Fengtai
●	●	Liuli Qiao	六里桥	10	57 133 477 554 568 603 838 941 941快 982 专3	1.309	7.828	Fengtai
●	｜	Qilizhuang	七里庄	14	77 83 137 323 400快 458 477 480 483 531 830 839 840 896 958 969 973 夜36 专3	1.778	9.606	Fengtai
●	｜	Fengtai Dongdajie	丰台东大街		335 349 395 459 477 678 845	1.325	10.931	Fengtai
●	｜	Fengtai Nanlu	丰台南路	16	69 351 353 602 627 845 专149	1.585	12.516	Fengtai
●	｜	Keyi Lu	科怡路		83 137 354 400 400快 912 快速直达专线22 专9	0.980	13.496	Fengtai
●	｜	Fengtai Science Park	丰台科技园		470 969 快速直达专线17 快速直达专线22 快速直达专线107 快速直达专线131 快速直达专线161 快速直达专线175 专63 专125 专126 专190 专209	0.788	14.284	Fengtai
●	●	Guogongzhuang	郭公庄	Fangshan (through service during weekday peak)	470 497 627 692 969 快速直达专线17 快速直达专线107 专83 专125 专180	1.347	15.631	Fengtai

=== Through service ===
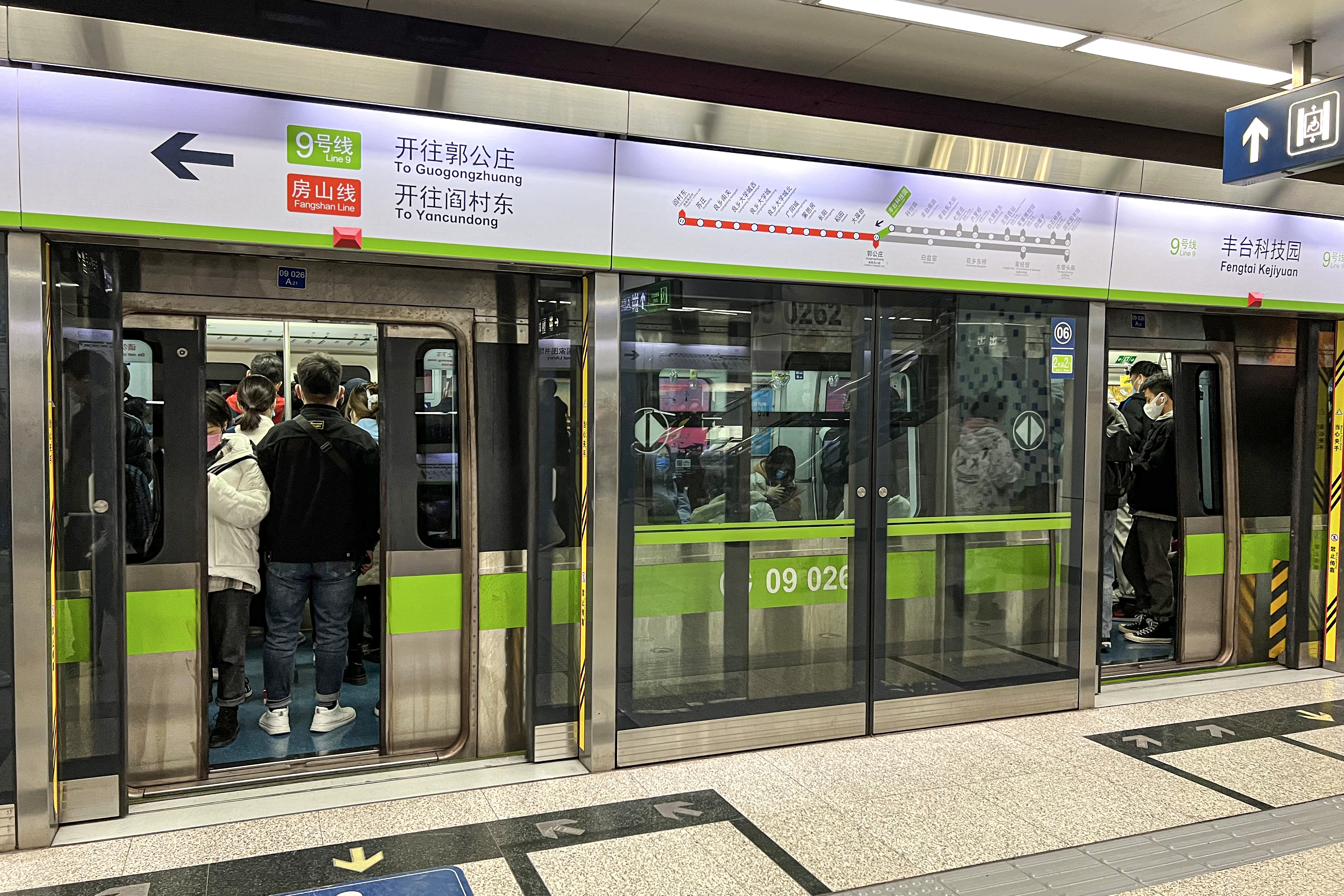
Route directory for through service between Line 9 and the Fangshan line.

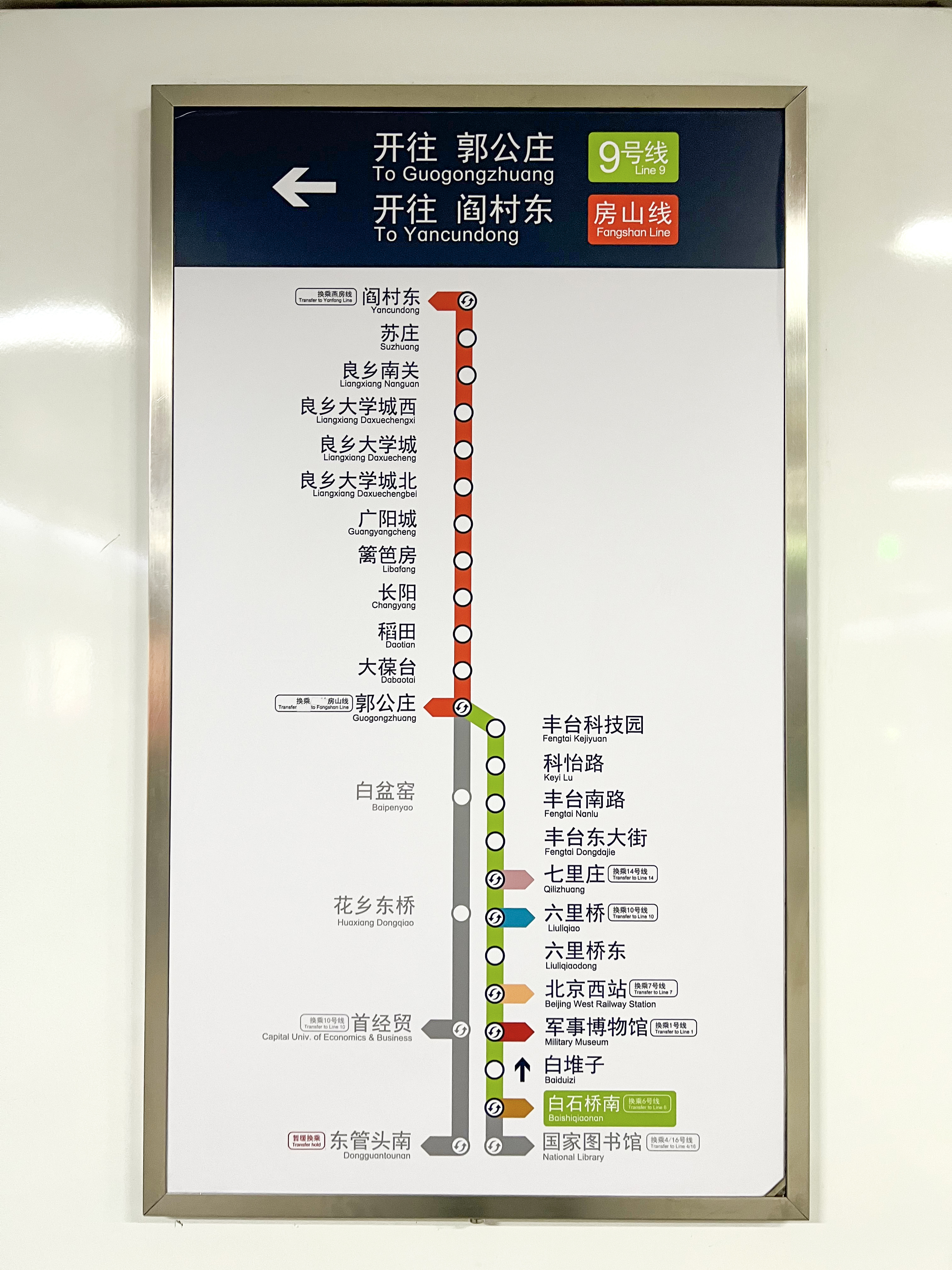
Route directory for through service between Line 9 and the Fangshan line.

In 2021, it was announced that there will be some through service between Line 9 and the Fangshan line. The operator is retrofitting the signal systems of both lines to achieve this. Through service started on 18 January 2023.

== Rolling Stock ==
Line 9 is served by a fleet of 37 6-car DKZ33 trains built by CNR Changchun.

Model	Image	Manufacturer	Year built	Amount in service	Fleet numbers	Depot
DKZ33		CRRC Changchun Railway Vehicles	2011, 2019	37	09 001–09 037	Guogongzhuang
