= Guogongzhuang station =

Beijing Subway interchange station

Coordinates: 39.814322°N 116.301889°E

Guogongzhuang 郭公庄
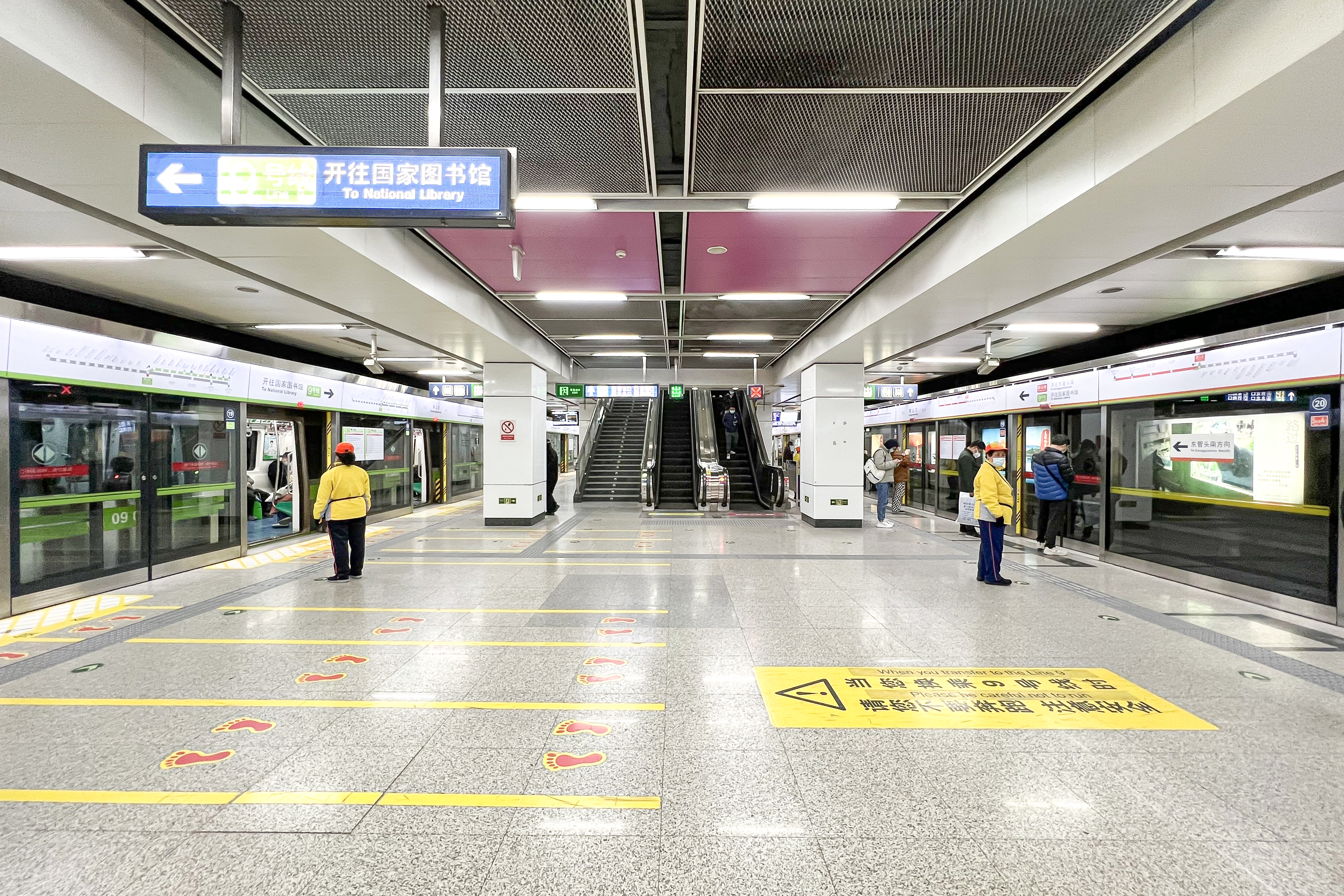
- Northbound platform

General information
- Location: Fengtai District, Beijing; China
- Operator: Beijing Mass Transit Railway Operation Corporation Limited
- Lines: Line 9; Fangshan line
- Platforms: 4 (2 island platforms)
- Tracks: 4

Construction
- Structure type: Underground
- Accessible: Yes

History
- Opened: December 31, 2011; 14 years ago

Services
Preceding station	Beijing Subway	Following station
Fengtai Science Park towards National Library	Line 9	Terminus
Fengtai Science Park towards National Library	Fangshan line Through service (weekday peak only)	Dabaotai towards Yancundong
Baipenyao towards Dongguantounan	Fangshan line	Dabaotai towards Yancundong
Location
- Location within Beijing

Guogongzhuang (simplified Chinese: 郭公庄站; traditional Chinese: 郭公莊站; pinyin: Guōgōngzhuāng Zhàn) is an interchange station on Line 9 and Fangshan Line of the Beijing Subway, serving as the southern terminus of Line 9, and is located in Fengtai District. The station was the northern terminus of Fangshan Line until it was extended northward to Dongguantou South on December 31, 2020.

== Station layout ==
The station has underground dual-island platforms with a cross platform interchange. On one side terminating Line 9 trains interchange with Fangshan line trains heading to Yancundong (Yancun East), whilst on the other, Fangshan line trains heading to Dongguantounan (Dongguantou South) interchange with Line 9 and Fangshan line (through service) trains heading to Guojia Tushuguan (National Library).

=== Platform layout ===
To Fangshan Yancundong	←	Urban rail transit in China	←
	Doors open on the left
	Doors open on the right
To 9 Guogongzhuang	←	Termination platform	←
	→	Urban rail transit in China	→	To 9 / Fangshan (through service) Guojia Tushuguan (National Library)
	Doors open on the right
	Doors open on the left
	→	Urban rail transit in China	→	To Fangshan Dongguantounan

== Exits ==
There are 4 exits, lettered A, B, C, and D. Exit D is accessible.

== Gallery ==
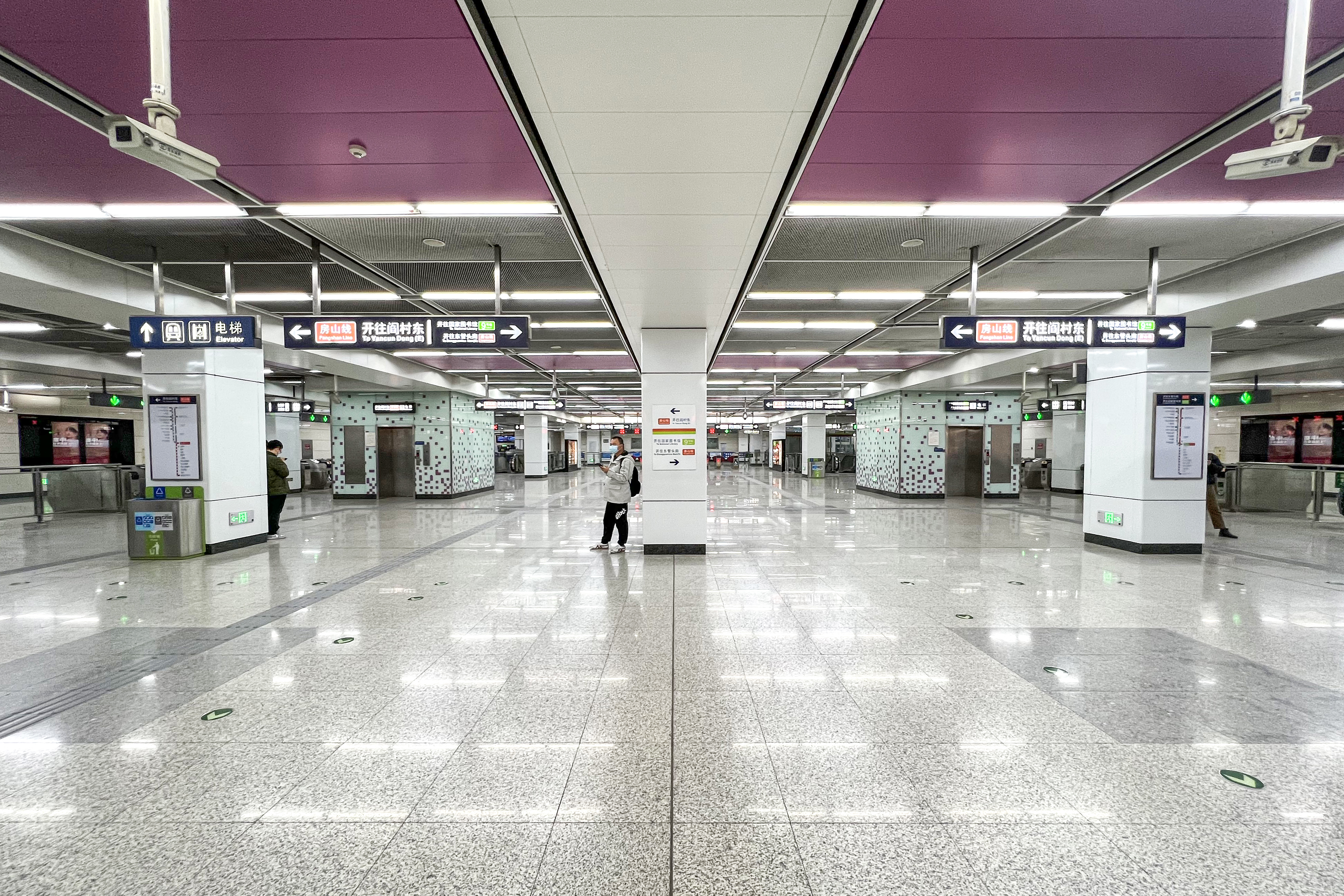
Concourse

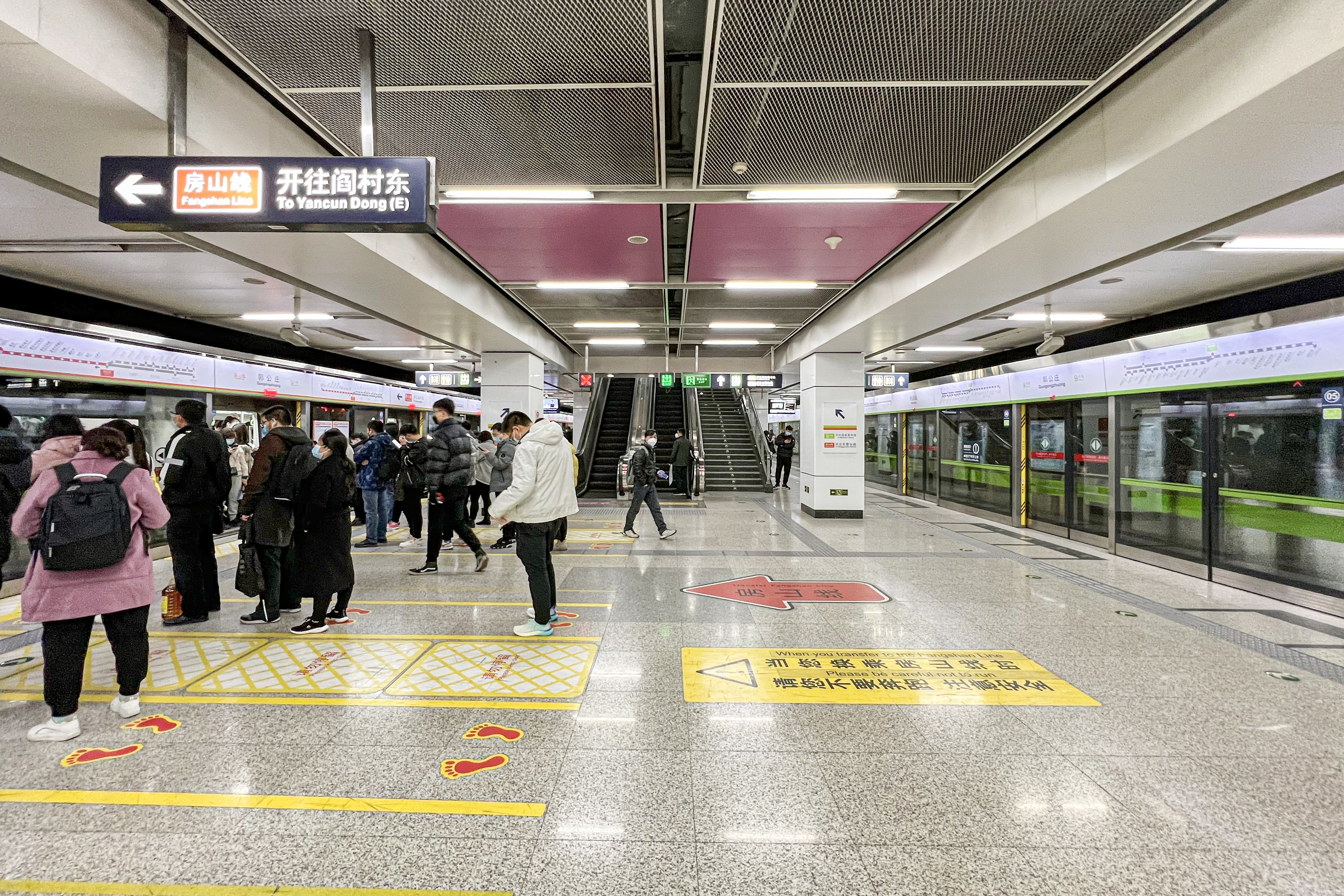
Southbound platform
