= Guojia Tushuguan (National Library) station =

Beijing Subway interchange station

Guojia Tushuguan (National Library) 国家图书馆
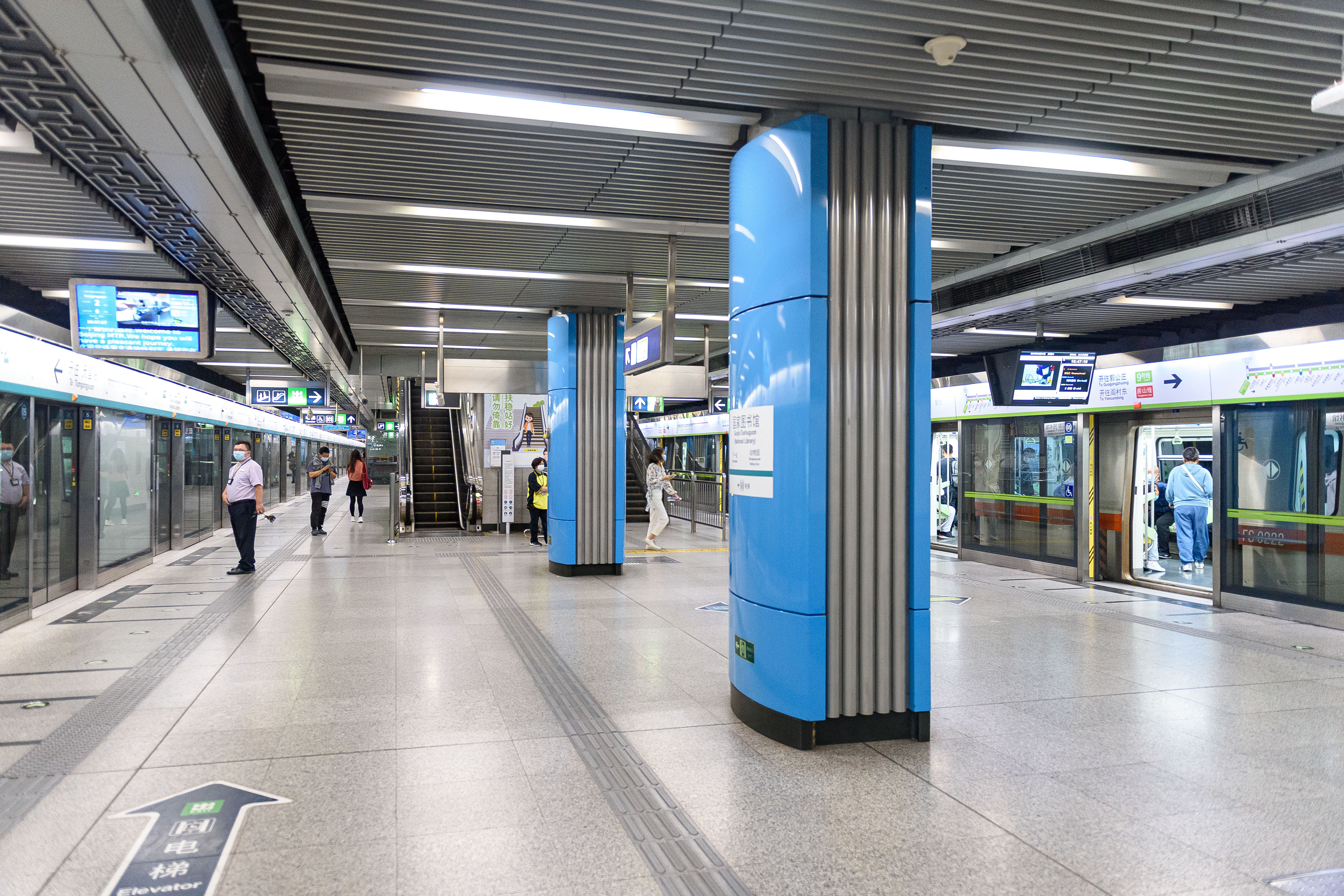
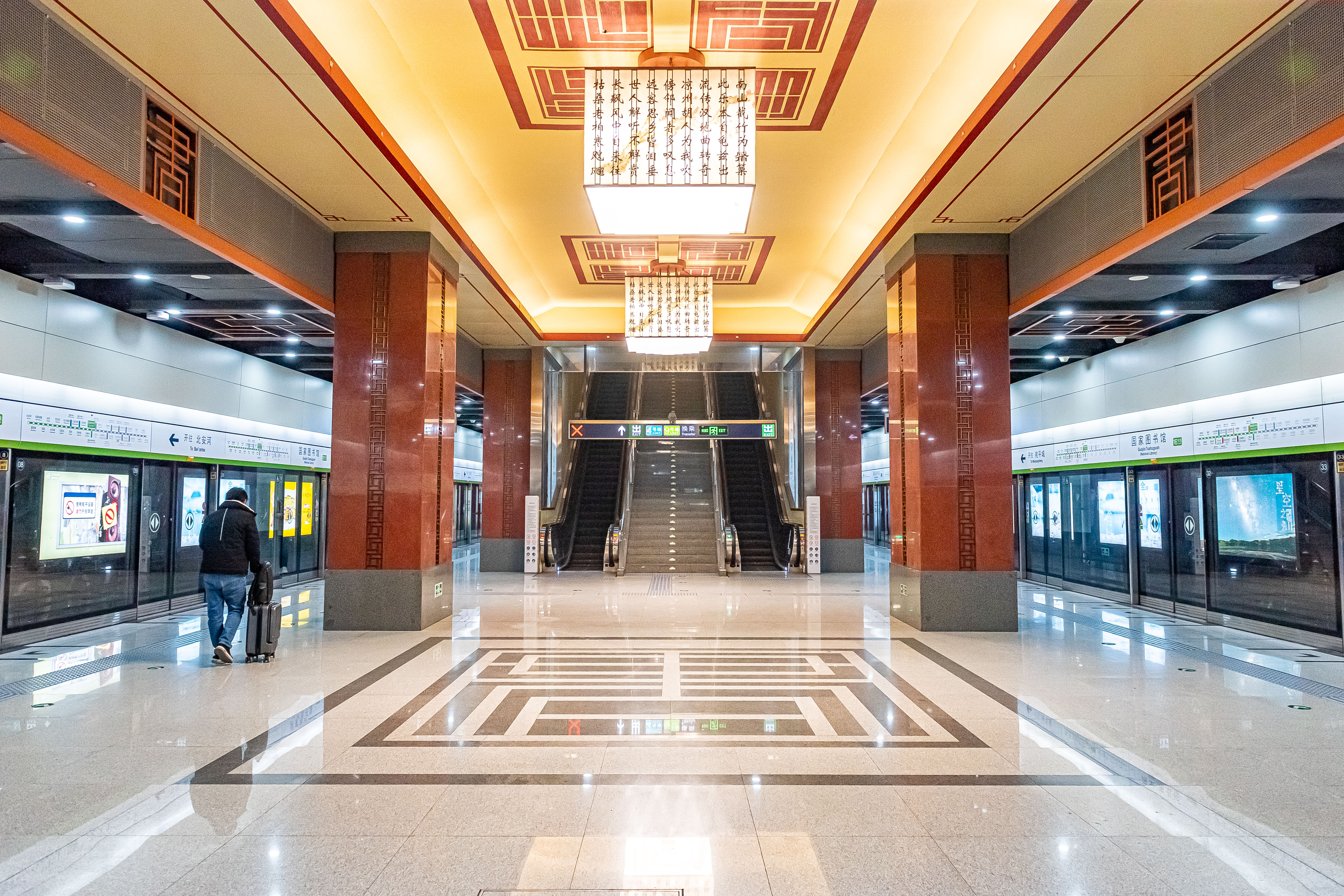
- Southbound platform of Line 4 and Line 9 Line 16 platform

General information
- Location: Zhongguancun South Street; Haidian District, Beijing; China
- Coordinates: 39°56′35″N 116°19′31″E
- Operator: Beijing MTR Corporation Limited (Lines 4 and 16); Beijing Mass Transit Railway Operation Corporation Limited (Line 9)
- Lines: Line 4; Line 9; Line 16; Fangshan line (through service to Line 9)
- Platforms: 6 (3 island platforms)
- Tracks: 6

Construction
- Structure type: Underground
- Accessible: Yes

History
- Opened: Line 4: September 28, 2009; 16 years ago; Line 9: December 30, 2012; 13 years ago; Line 16: December 31, 2020; 5 years ago

Services
Preceding station	Beijing Subway	Following station
Weigongcun towards Anheqiaobei	Line 4	Beijing Zoo towards Tiangong Yuan
Terminus	Line 9	Baishiqiaonan towards Guogongzhuang
Terminus	Fangshan line Through service (weekday peak only)	Baishiqiaonan towards Yancundong
Wanshou Si towards Bei'anhe	Line 16	Erligou towards Wanpingcheng
Location
- Location within Beijing

Guojia Tushuguan (National Library) station (Chinese: 国家图书馆站; pinyin: Guójiā Túshūguǎn zhàn) is an interchange station on Line 4, Line 9 and Line 16 of the Beijing Subway. Its name is derived from the nearby National Library of China.

The station features a double-island interchange layout, with Line 4 trains on the outside and Line 9 trains on the inside, which allows most riders to change lines simply by crossing the platform, instead of walking between levels. This configuration is known as cross-platform interchange. The station handles 106,000 transfers between Lines 4 and 9 per day. The platform for Line 16 is built under the Line 4 and Line 9 platform. Peak-hour through service of Fangshan line to Line 9 started on January 18, 2023.

== Station layout ==
The line 4 and 9 stations have underground dual-island platforms with cross-platform interchange. On one side, southbound line 4 trains to Tiangongyuan interchange with originating line 9 and weekday peak Fangshan line (through service) trains heading towards Guogongzhuang and Yancundong, whilst on the other, terminating line 9 and weekday peak Fangshan line (through service) trains interchange with northbound line 4 trains heading towards Anheqiao North. The line 16 station has a separate underground island platform.

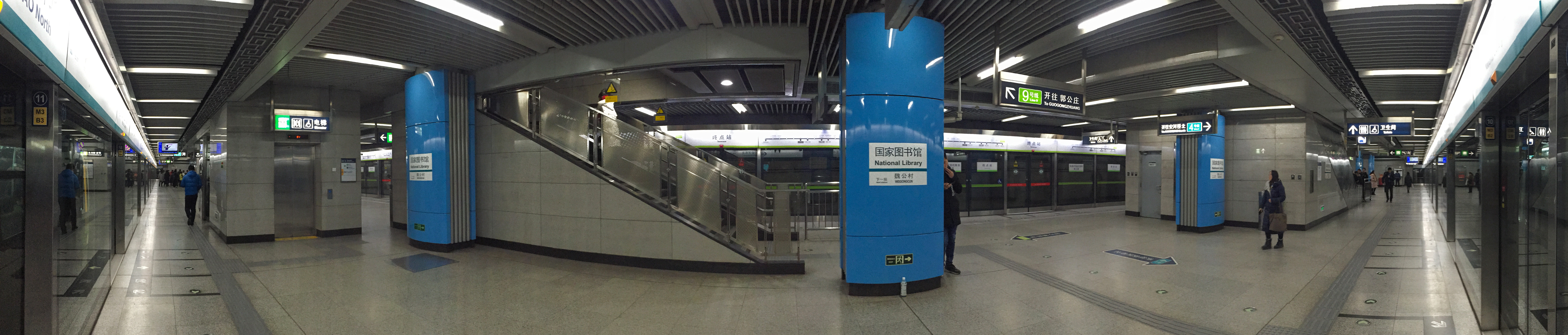
Northbound platform panorama of National Library Station
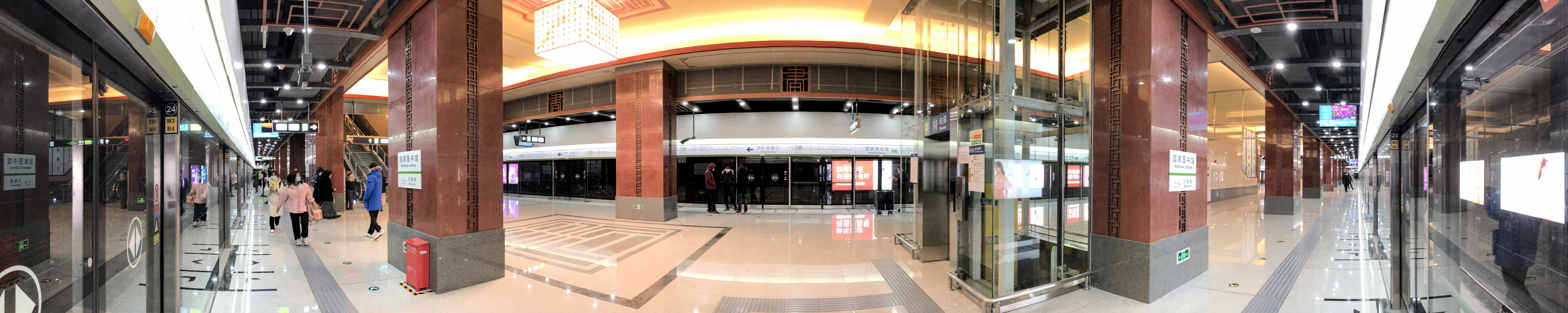
Platform panorama of L16 National Library Station

== Exits ==
There are 6 exits, lettered A, B, C, D, E and F. Exits D and F are accessible via elevators.

== Gallery ==
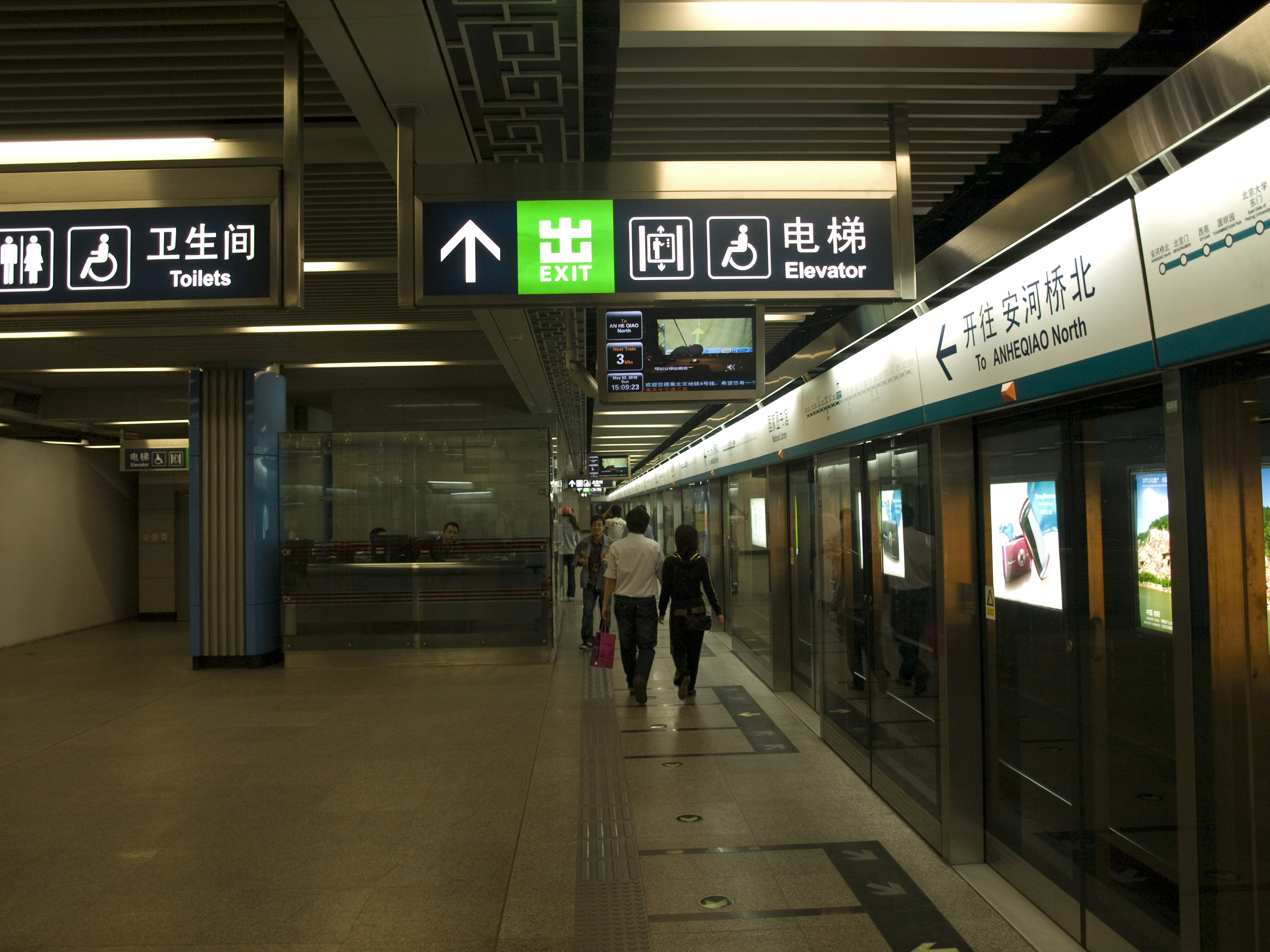
Line 4 platform in May 2010, the white wall on the left shows construction of transfer to Line 9

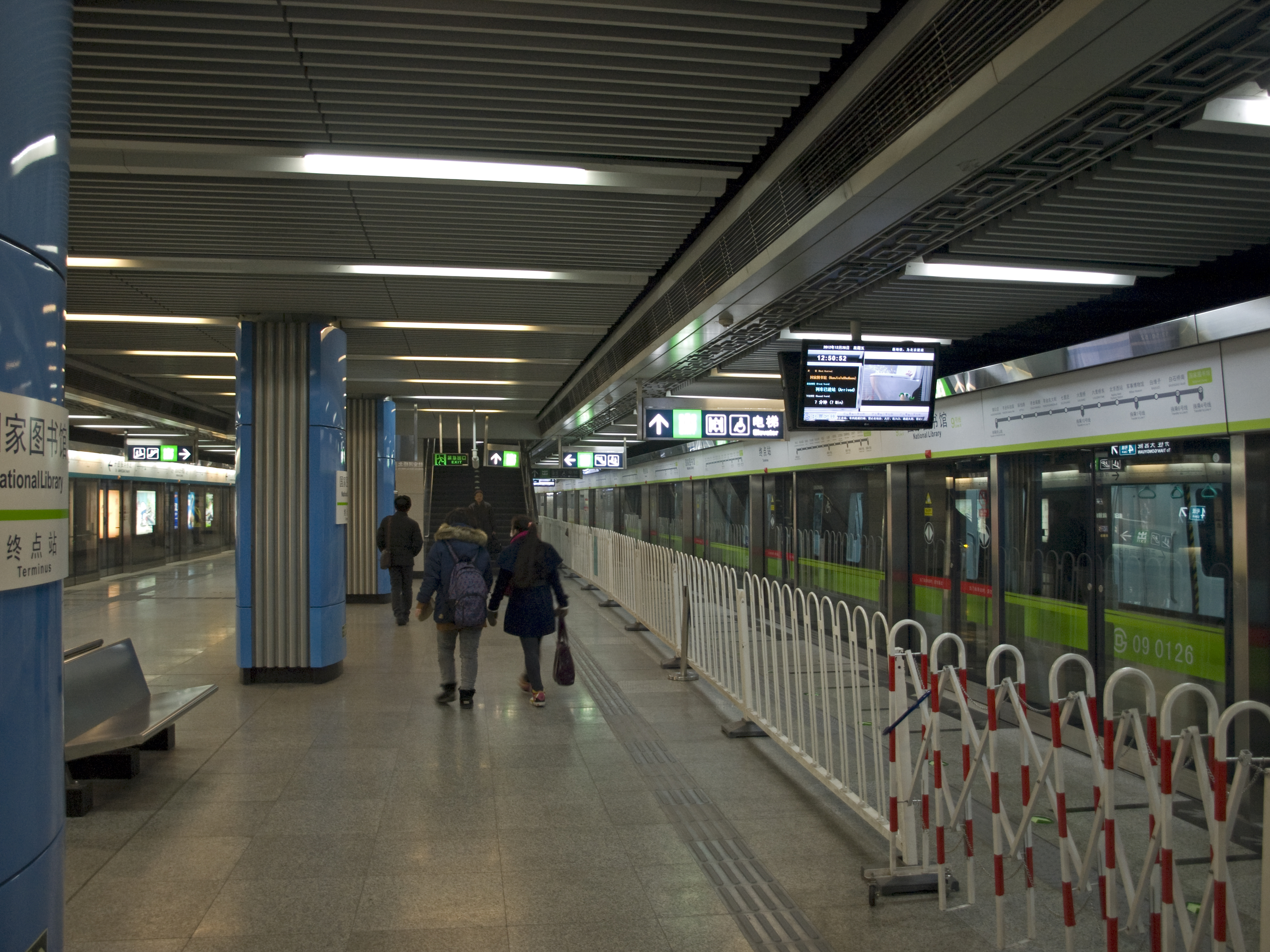
The day before the connection with line 9 opened to the public

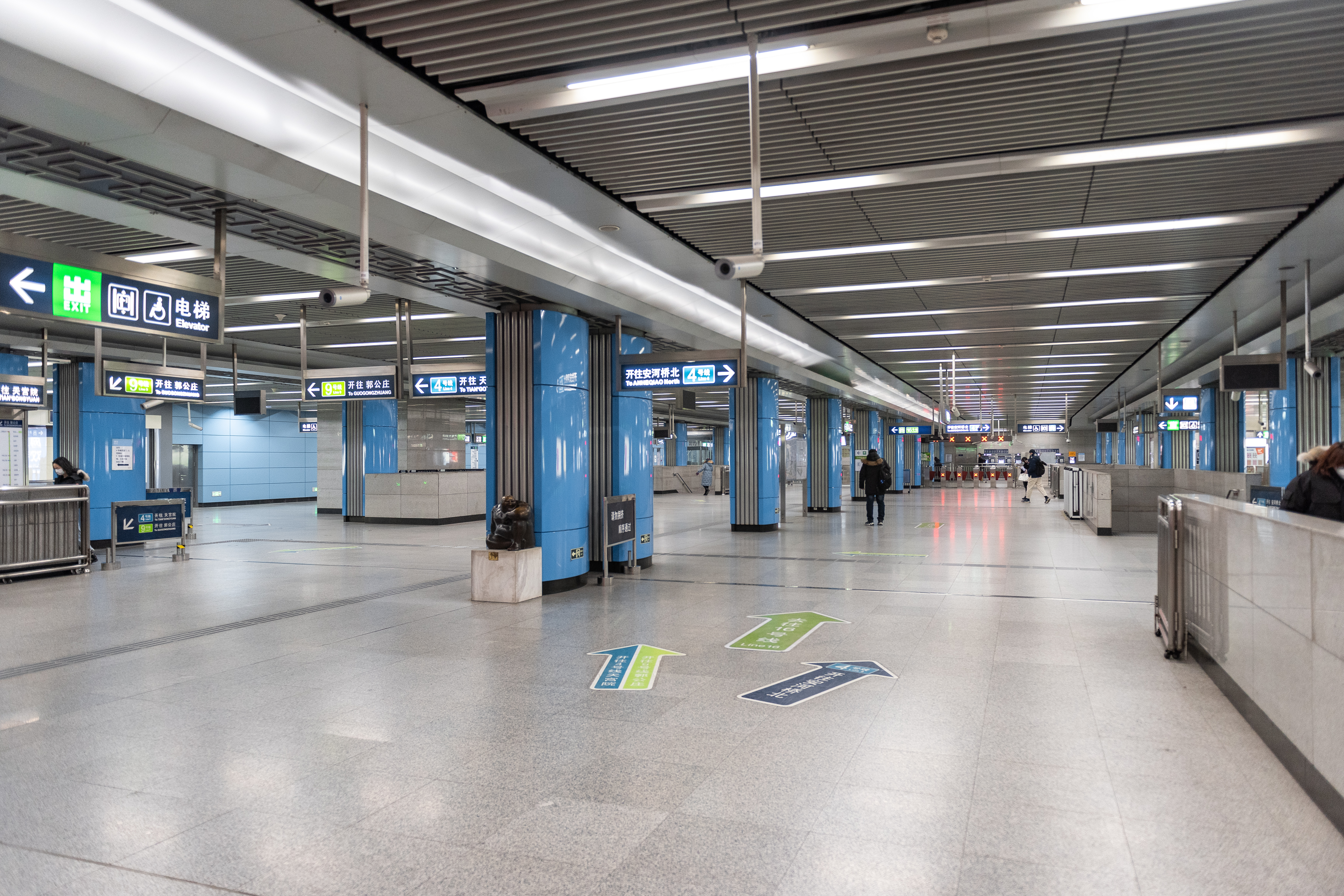
Line 4 & 9 concourse

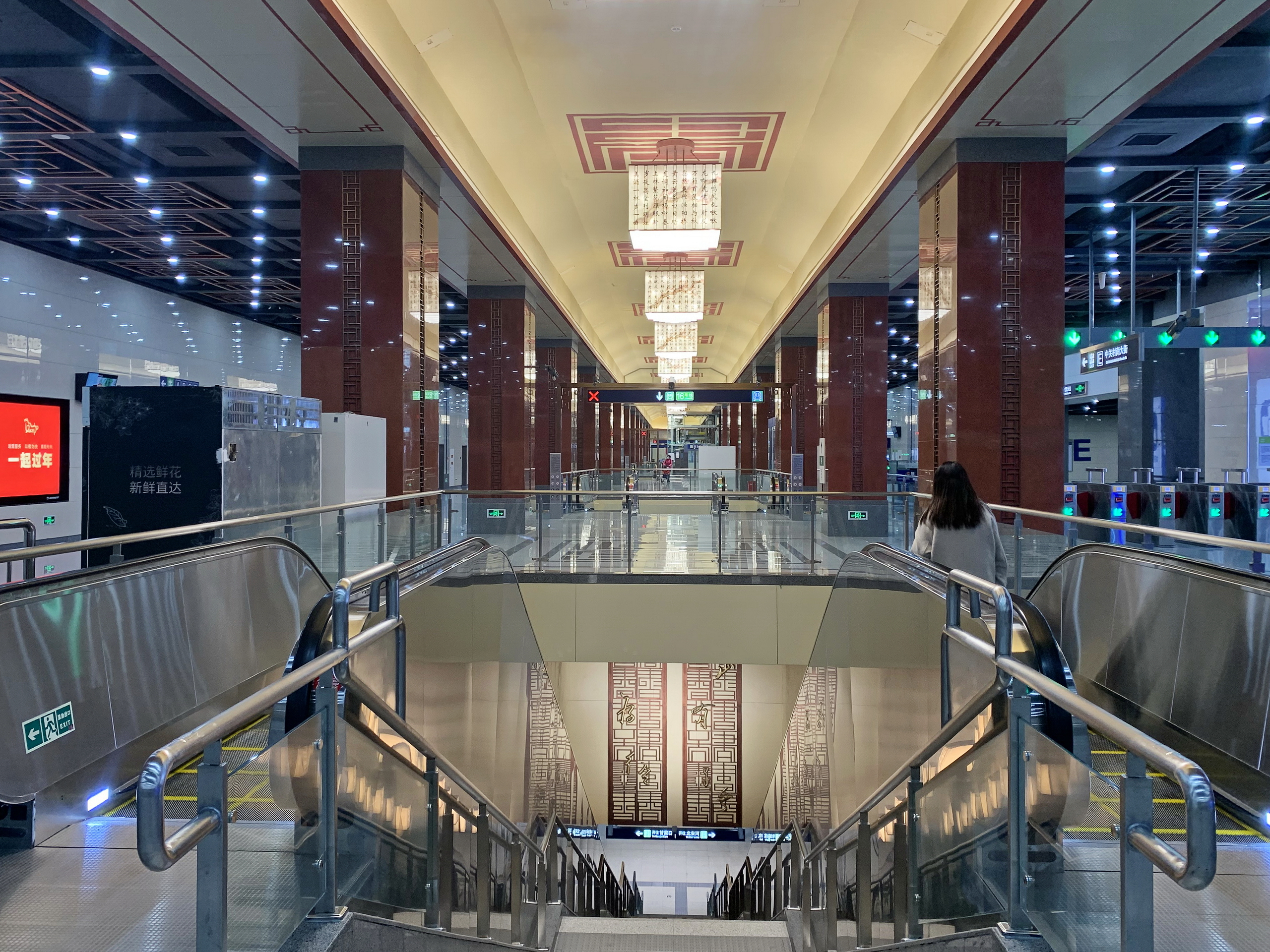
Line 16 concourse

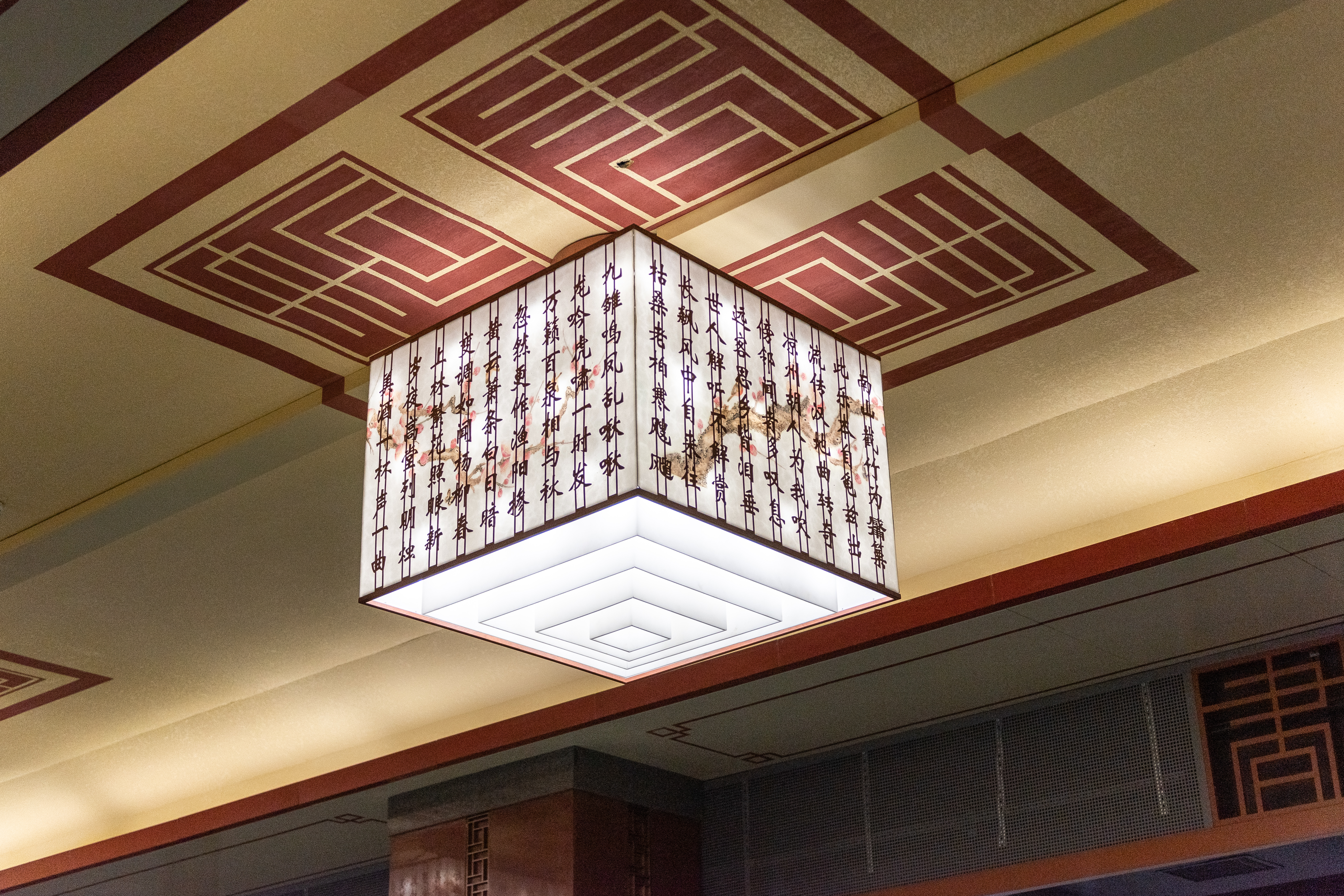
Line 16 station lamp decorated with Tang dynasty poem On Hearing An Wanshan Play the Reed-Pipe
