= Yuquanying Subdistrict =

Yuquanying Subdistrict 玉泉营街道
- Subdistrict
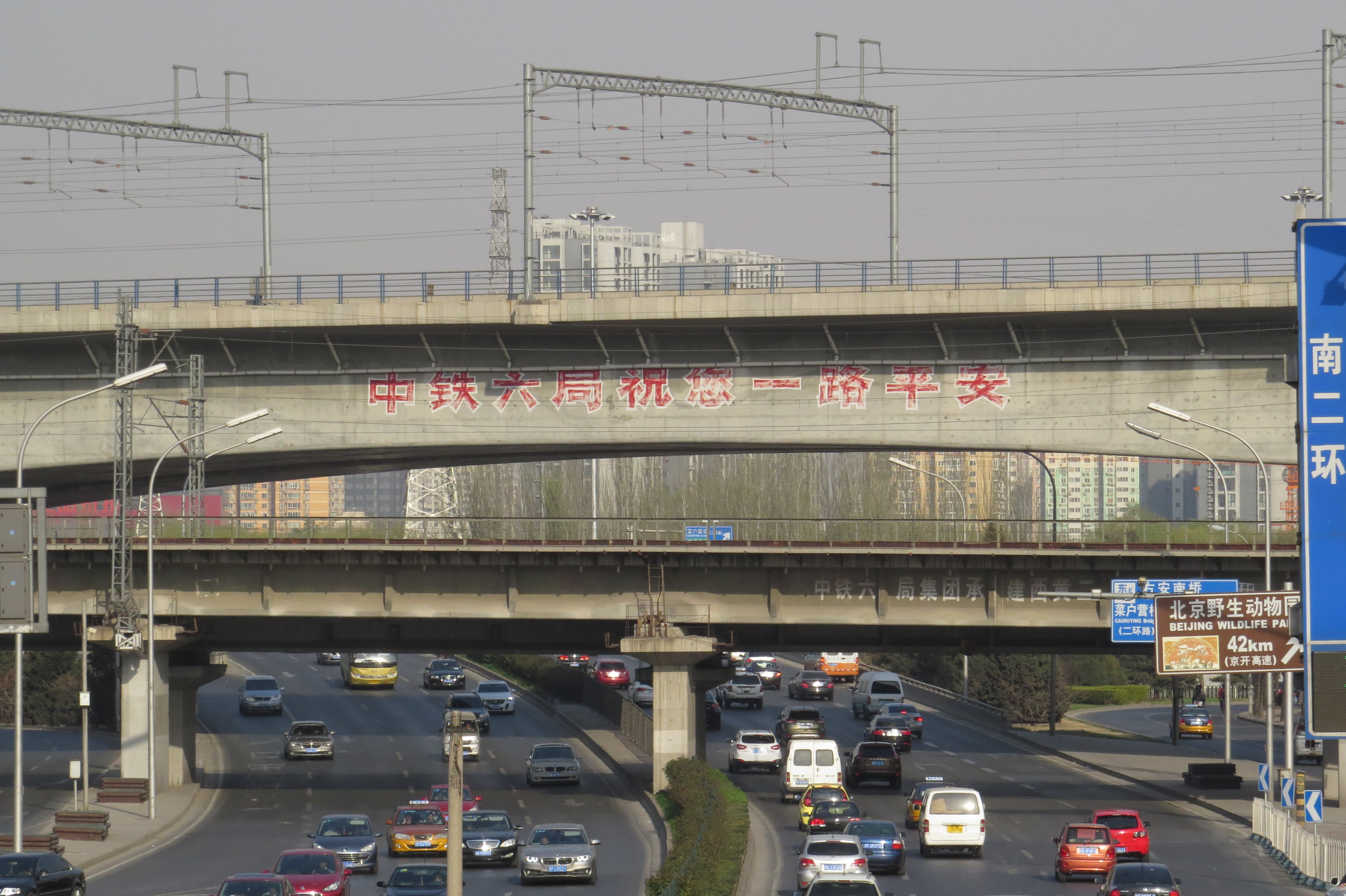
- Yuquanying Bridge within the subdistrict, 2016

- Location within Beijing Location within China
- Coordinates: 39°49′53″N 116°19′28″E
- Country: China
- Municipality: Beijing
- District: Fengtai
- Village-level Divisions: 9 communities 3 village
- Time zone: UTC+8 (China Standard)
- Postal code: 100070
- Area code: 010

Yuquanying Subdistrict (Chinese: 玉泉营街道; pinyin: Yùquányíng Jiēdào) is a subdistrict situated in the east of Fengtai District, Beijing, China. It shares border with Taipingqiao and You'anmen Subdistricts in the north, Xiluoyuan and Majiapu Subdistricts in the east, Huaxiang Subdistrict in the south, Kandan and Xincun Subdistricts in the west.

The subdistrict was formed from parts of Huaxiang Township and Xincun Subdistrict in 2021.

== Administrative divisions ==
In 2023, Yuquanying Subdistrict had 12 subdivisions, with 9 of them being communities and 3 being villages:

Administrative Division Code	Community Names	Name Transliteration	Type
110106022001	草桥欣园第一	Caoqiao Xinyuan Diyi	Community
110106022002	草桥欣园第二	Caoqiao Xinyuan Di'er	Community
110106022003	纪家庙	Jijiamiao	Community
110106022004	青秀城	Qingxiucheng	Community
110106022005	万柳园	Wanliuyuan	Community
110106022006	万柳西园	Wanliu Xiyuan	Community
110106022007	风格与林	Fengge Yulin	Community
110106022008	草桥	Caoqiao	Community
110106022009	草桥欣园第三	Caoqiao Xinyuan Disan	Community
110106022200	黄土岗	Huangtugang	Village
110106022201	纪家庙	Jijiamiao	Village
110106022202	草桥	Caoqiao	Village

== Gallery ==
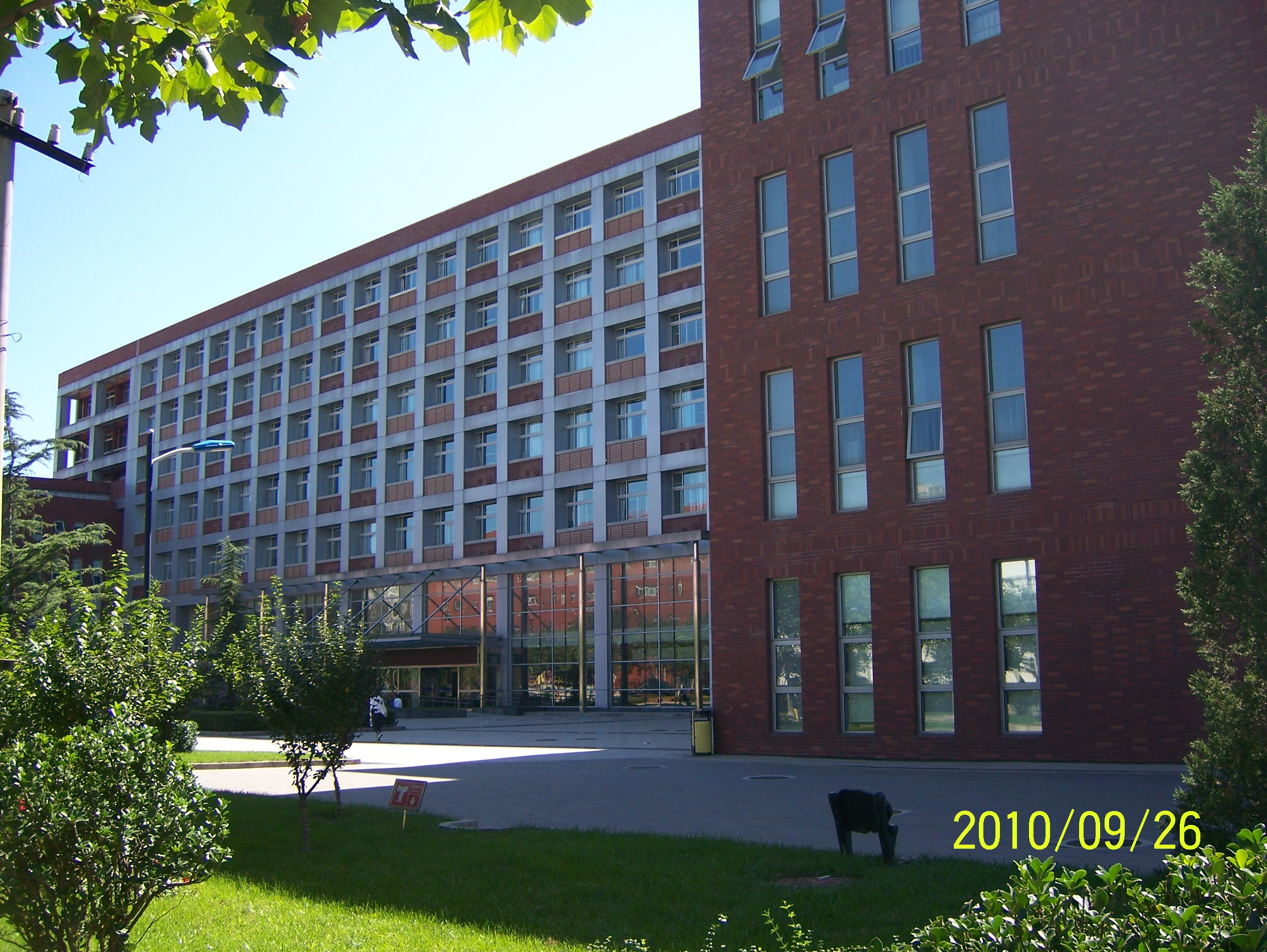
Capital University of Economics and Business, 2010

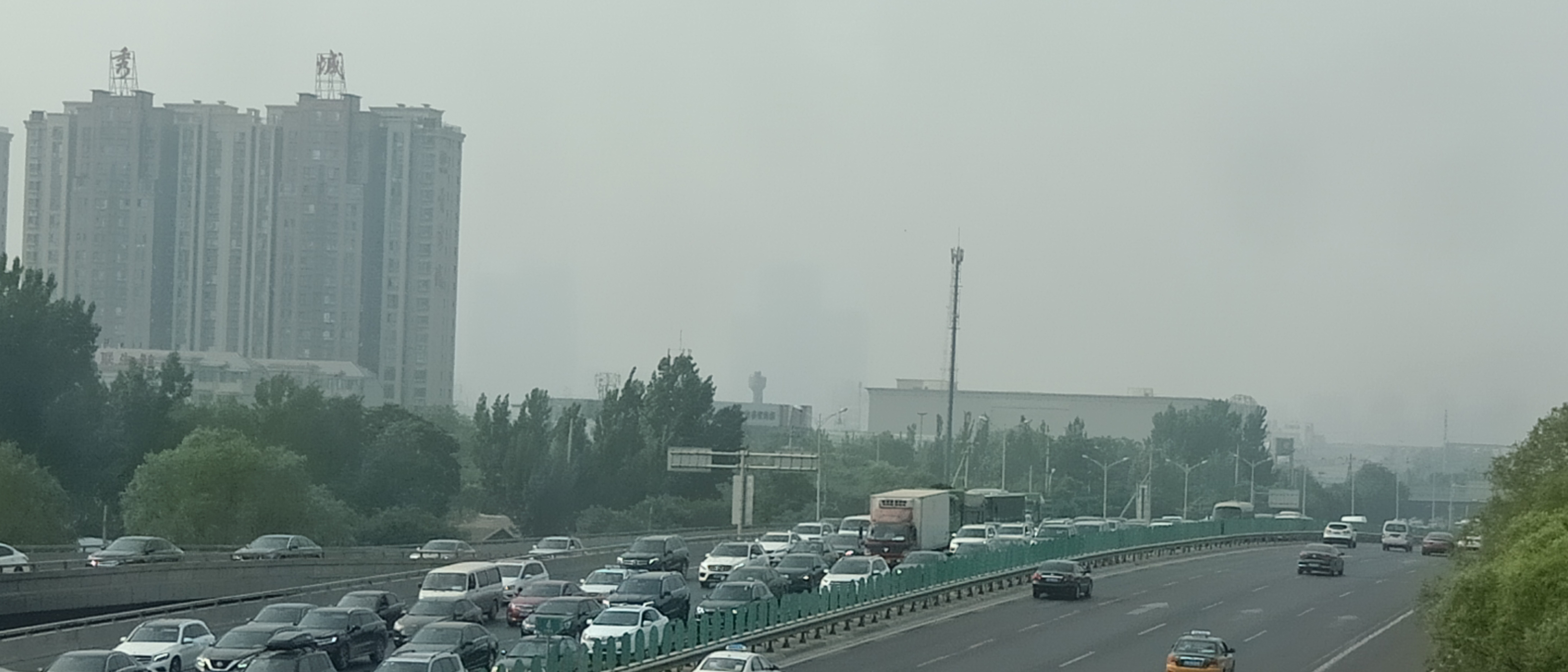
Dahongmen South Bridge, on the southeastern part of the subdistrict, 2018

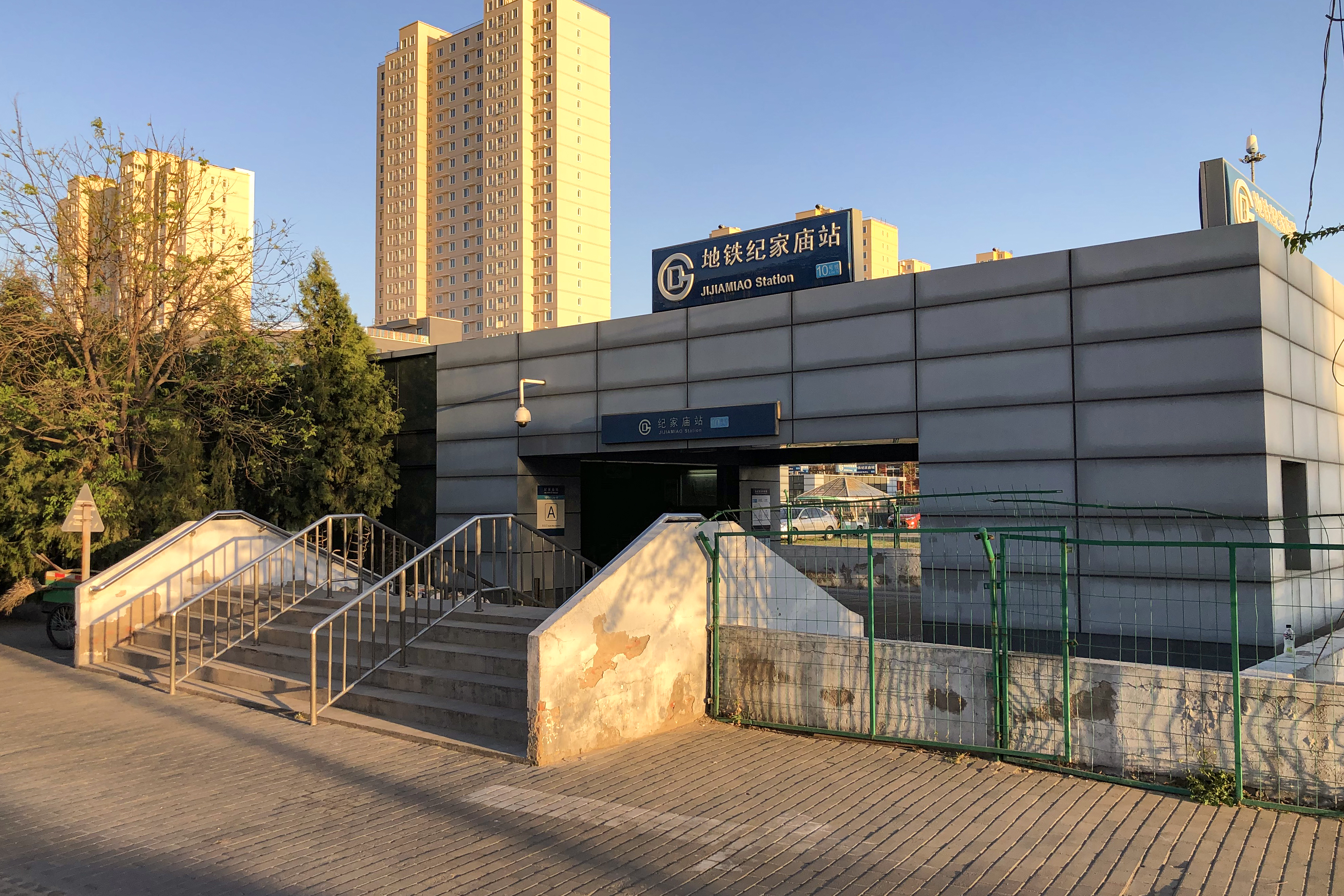
Jijiamiao station of Beijing Subway, 2021

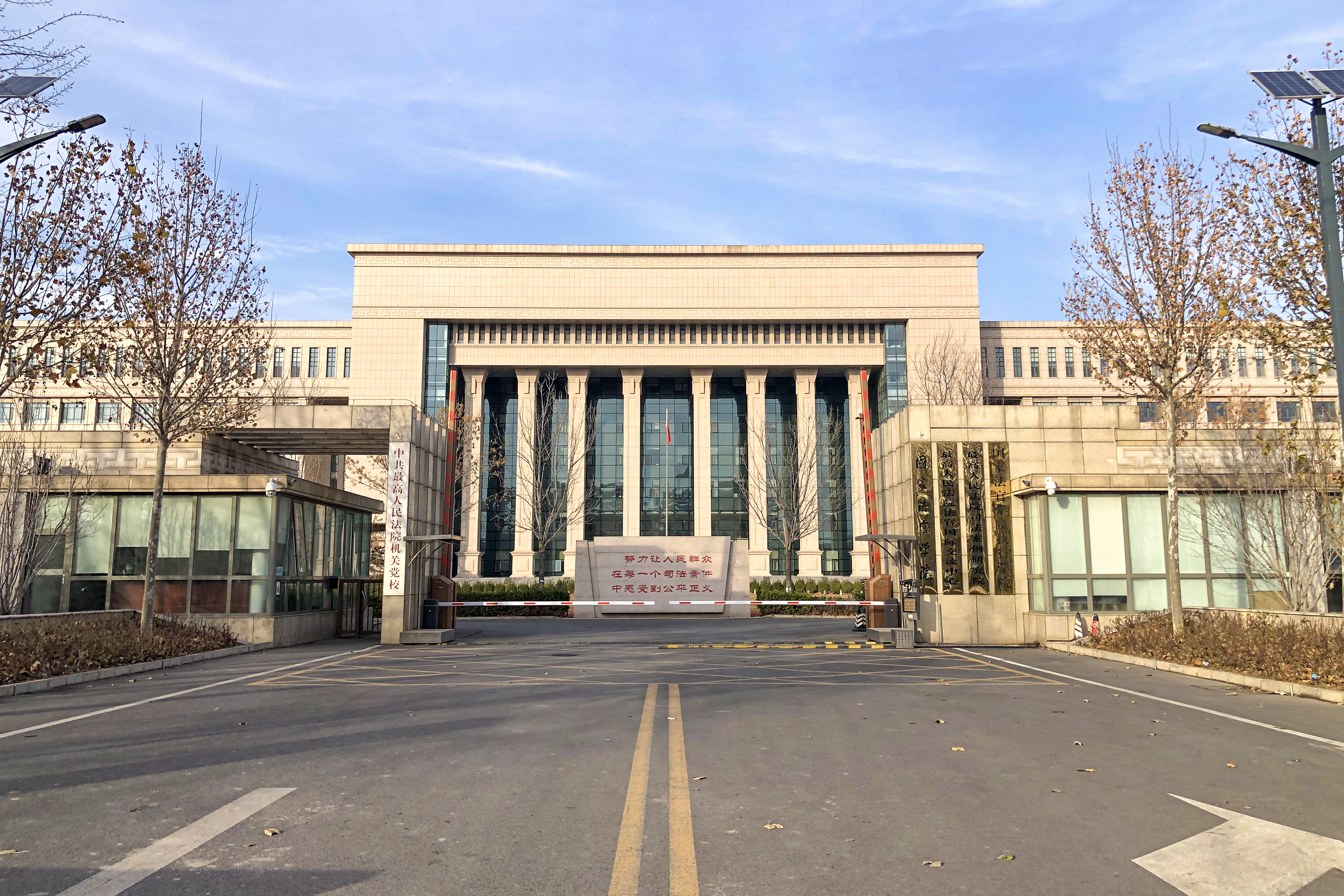
National Judges College, 2021

== See also ==
- List of township-level divisions of Beijing
- Yuquanying
