= Yuquanying =

Historic village and traffic hub in Beijing

Coordinates: 39.8464°N 116.3430°E

Yuquanying (simplified Chinese: 玉泉营; traditional Chinese: 玉泉營; pinyin: Yùquányíng) is an area in the Fengtai district of southwest Beijing. The historic village of Yuquanying was well known for its floriculture dating back to the Jin dynasty, and a flower market continues to operate there today. There are also shopping complexes selling furniture and building materials.

Since 2001, Yuquanying Bridge has served as the starting point for the Jingkai Expressway, linking Beijing to Hebei Province in the south. In 2021, the area become part of a new administrative division, Yuquanying Subdistrict, within Fengtai District.

== Floriculture ==
Historically known as Huaxiang ("flower town"), Yuquanying is considered one of the "Eighteen villages in Fengtai" with large-scale floriculture dating back 800 years. Plants were cultivated in adobe greenhouses.

A flower market continues to operate in Yuquanying in the 21st century. As of 2003, it was the largest wholesale market for potted flowers in Beijing.

== Road infrastructure ==
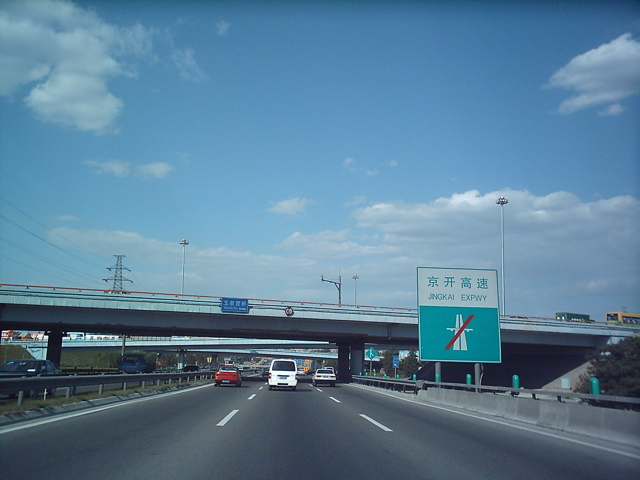
Yuquanying Bridge

Yuquanying is the site of a major traffic hub, connecting Beijing to surrounding areas via the national highway network. The Yuquanying Bridge (玉泉营桥) is the starting point of the northern end of the Jingkai Expressway. Construction of the Beijing section of the expressway was completed in June 2001.

== Transport ==
- Caoqiao station, located near Yuquanying Bridge

== Commerce ==
The Beijing Yuquanying Roundabout Furniture City (北京玉泉营环岛家具城) opened in August 1996. The Beijing Yuquanying Roundabout Building Materials City (北京玉泉营环岛建材城) was built shortly thereafter. The two halls linked together with two other buildings to form a conjoined complex.

== See also ==
- Huaxiang
- Yuquanying Subdistrict
