= Dahongmen =

Dahongmen may refer to:

- Dahongmen Subdistrict, Beijing

== Transport ==
- Dahong Men station, Beijing Subway
- Dahongmen Nan station, Beijing Subway
- Dahongmen railway station, freight-only railway station in Beijing, located far from the two subway stations
