= Majiapu Subdistrict =

Majiapu Subdistrict 马家堡街道
- Subdistrict
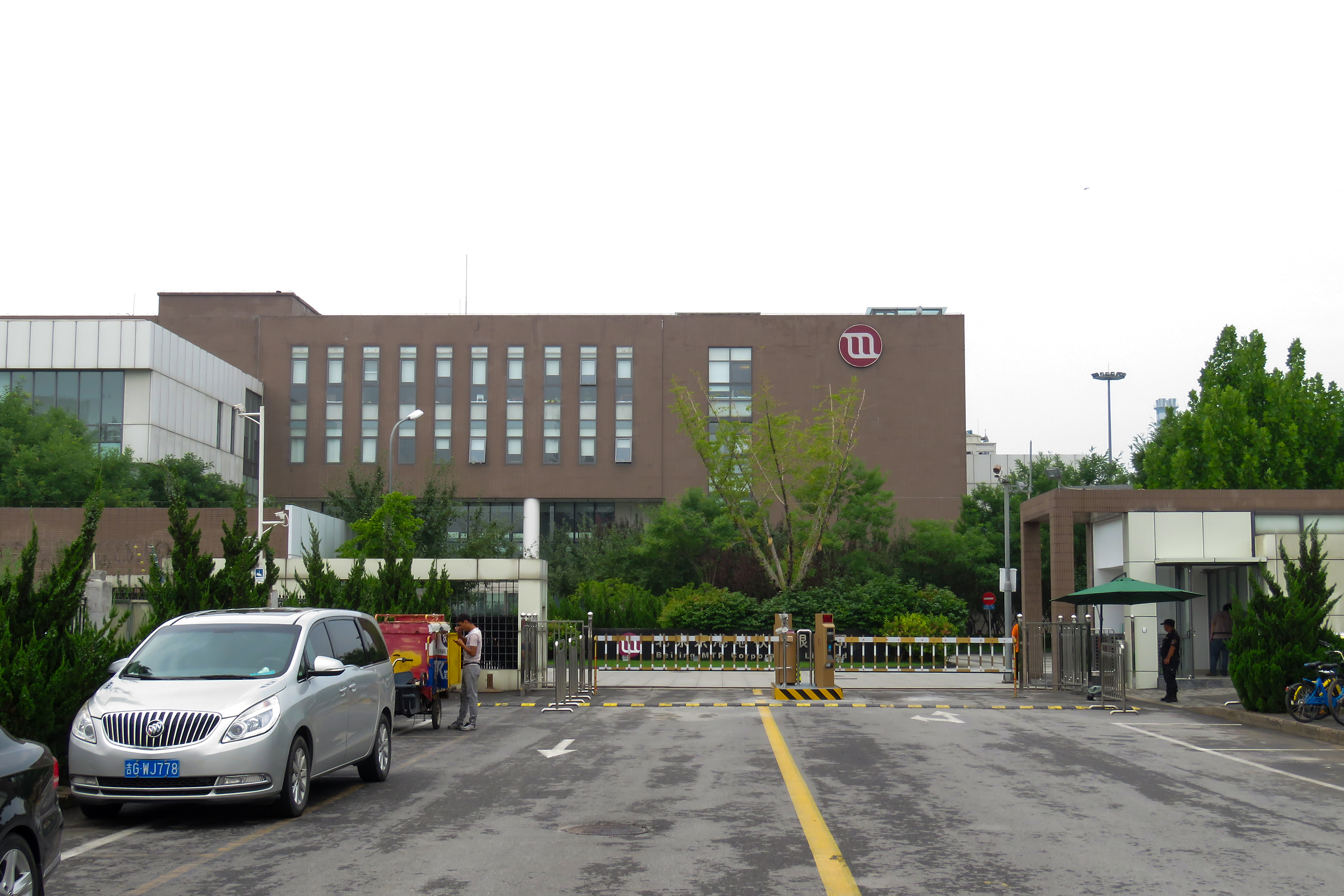
- Beijing MTR Corporation Limited headquarter within the subdistrict, 2018

- Location within Beijing Location within China
- Coordinates: 39°50′29″N 116°21′33″E
- Country: China
- Municipality: Beijing
- District: Fengtai
- Village-level Divisions: 17 communities

Area
  - Total: 4.24 km^{2} (1.64 sq mi)

Population (2020)
  - Total: 111,470
  - Density: 26,300/km^{2} (68,100/sq mi)
- Time zone: UTC+8 (China Standard)
- Postal code: 100067
- Area code: 010

Majiapu Subdistrict (Chinese: 马家堡街道; pinyin: Mǎjiāpù Jiēdào) is a subdistrict on the eastern part of Fengtai District, Beijing, China. It borders Xiluoyuan Subdistrict to the north, Xiluoyuan and Dahongmen Subdistricts to the east, Nanyuan Township to the south, Xincun Subdistrict and Huaxiang Township to the west. As of 2020, it has a total population of 111,470.

The name of the subdistrict, Majiapu (Chinese: 马家堡; lit. 'Ma Family Town'), is from a tavern that was owned by Ma brothers around the end of Ming dynasty. It came to be known as Majiapu as it developed during the reign of Qianlong Emperor, and the name was later corrupted to Majiapu.

== History ==
Timeline of changes in the status of Majiapu Subdistrict
Time	Status
Ming dynasty	Part of Daxing County
1949	Part of Nanyuan District
1958	Part of Nanyuan Township, Fengtai District
1988	Part of Xiluoyuan Subdistrict
1997	Separated from Xiluoyuan and became Majiapu Subdistrict

== Administrative Division ==
As of 2023, there are 17 residential communities under Majiapu Subdistrict, and they are listed as follows:

Administrative Division Code	Community Names	Name Transliteration
110106015001	嘉园一里	Jiayuan Yili
110106015002	嘉园二里	Jiayuan Erli
110106015003	嘉园三里	Jiayuan Sanli
110106015004	西里第一	Xili Diyi
110106015005	西里第二	Xili Di'er
110106015006	西里第三	Xili Disan
110106015007	双晨	Shuangchen
110106015008	角门东里西	Jiaomen Donglixi
110106015009	晨宇	Chenyu
110106015010	欣汇	Xinhui
110106015011	富卓苑	Fuzhuoyuan
110106015012	玉安园	Yu'anyuan
110106015013	城南嘉园	Chengnan Jiayaun
110106015014	枫竹苑	Fengzhuyuan
110106015015	星河苑	Xingheyuan
110106015016	镇国寺	Zhenguosi
110106015017	北甲地	Beijiadi

== See also ==
- List of township-level divisions of Beijing
