= Caihuying station =

Beijing Subway station

Caihuying 菜户营
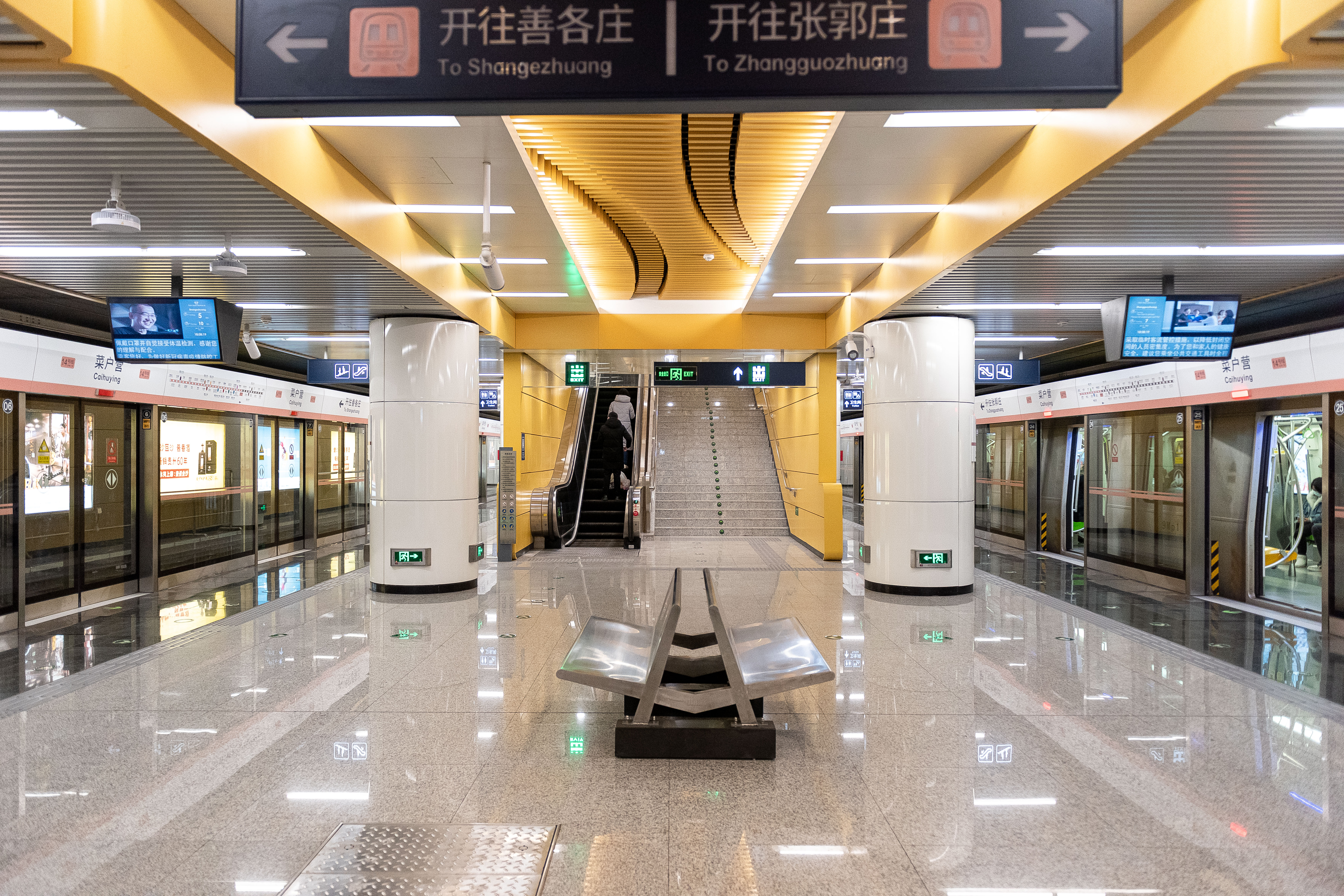
- Platform

General information
- Location: Intersection of Lize Road and Liucun Road; Lize Business District, Taipingqiao Subdistrict, Fengtai District, Beijing; China
- Coordinates: 39.86627°N 116.33667°E
- Operator: Beijing MTR Corporation Limited
- Line: Line 14
- Platforms: 2 (1 island platform)
- Tracks: 2

Construction
- Structure type: Underground
- Accessible: Yes

History
- Opened: December 31, 2021

Services
Preceding station	Beijing Subway	Following station
Lize Shangwuqu towards Zhangguozhuang	Line 14	Xitieying towards Shangezhuang
Location
- Location within Beijing

Caihuying station (Chinese: 菜户营站; pinyin: Càihùyíng zhàn) is a subway station on Line 14 of the Beijing Subway. The station opened on December 31, 2021.

== Platform layout ==
The station has an underground island platform.

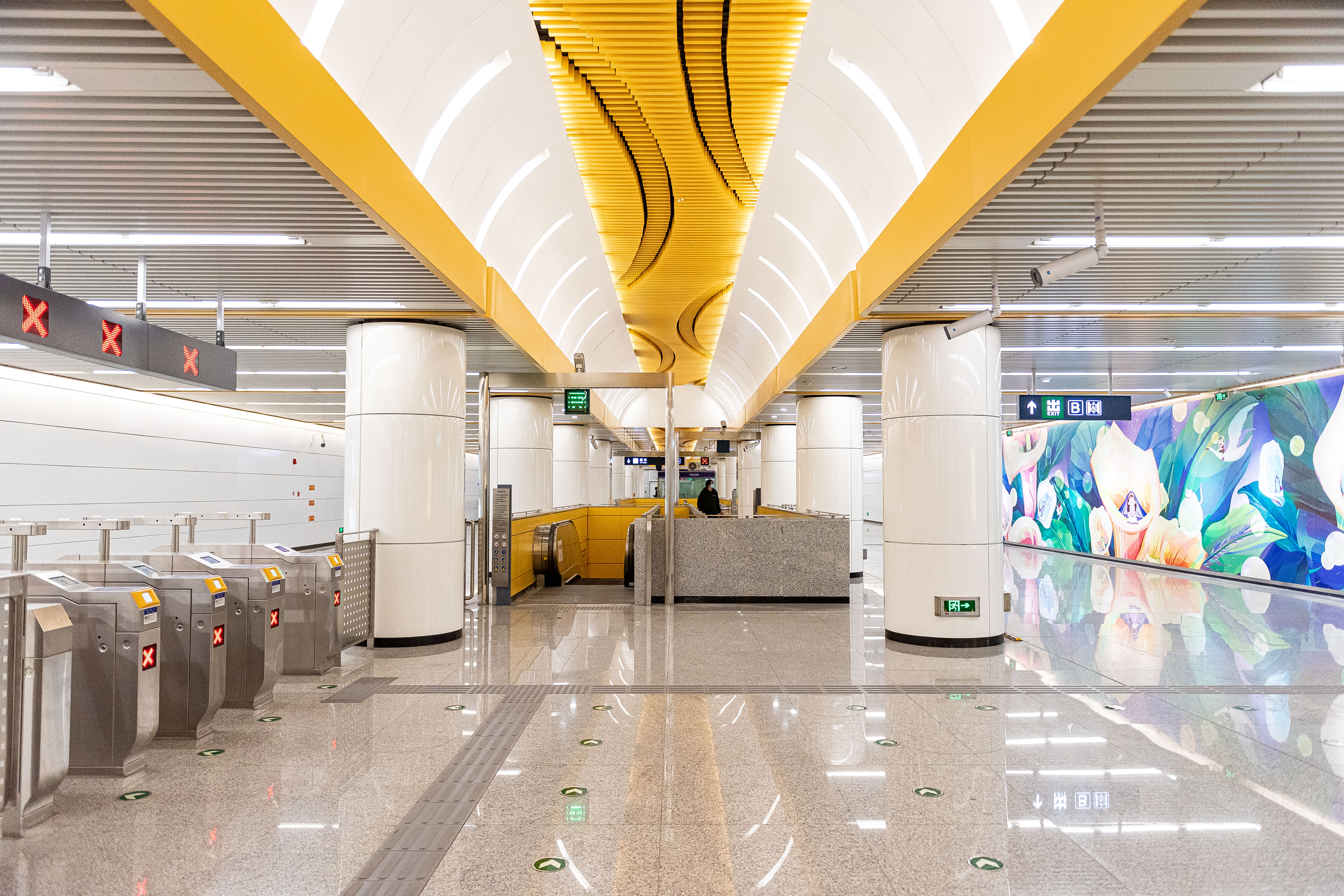
Concourse

== Exits ==
There are 2 exits, lettered A and B. Exit B is accessible via an elevator.
