= Xitieying station =

Beijing Subway station

Xitieying 西铁营
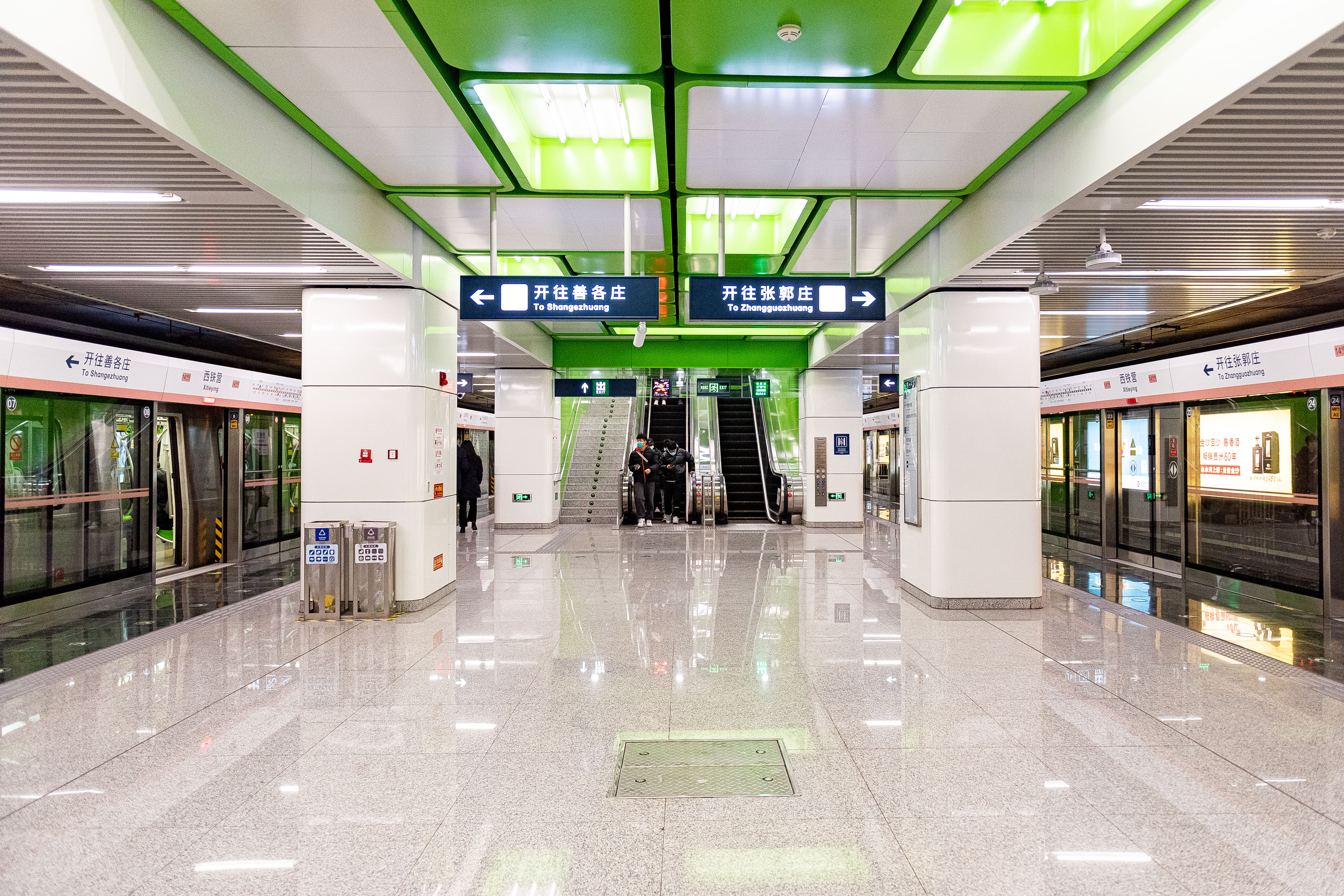
- Platform

General information
- Location: Intersection of Yulin South Road and Jingkai East Road; You'anmen Subdistrict, Fengtai District, Beijing; China
- Coordinates: 39.859738°N 116.349568°E
- Operator: Beijing MTR Corporation Limited
- Line: Line 14
- Platforms: 2 (1 island platform)
- Tracks: 2

Construction
- Structure type: Underground
- Accessible: Yes

History
- Opened: December 31, 2021

Services
Preceding station	Beijing Subway	Following station
Caihuying towards Zhangguozhuang	Line 14	Jingfengmen towards Shangezhuang
Location
- Location within Beijing

Xitieying station (Chinese: 西铁营站; pinyin: Xītiěyíng zhàn) is a subway station on Line 14 of the Beijing Subway. The station opened on December 31, 2021.

== Platform layout ==
The station has an underground island platform.

On the station hall floor of this station, there is a mural "Elegant Interest in Xiying" designed by Xiang Yu, a graduate student of the Sculpture Department of the Central Academy of Fine Arts. Through the use of traditional Chinese cultural elements such as classical furniture and Penjing, it reproduces the peaceful and elegant life of the ancient Beijing literati.

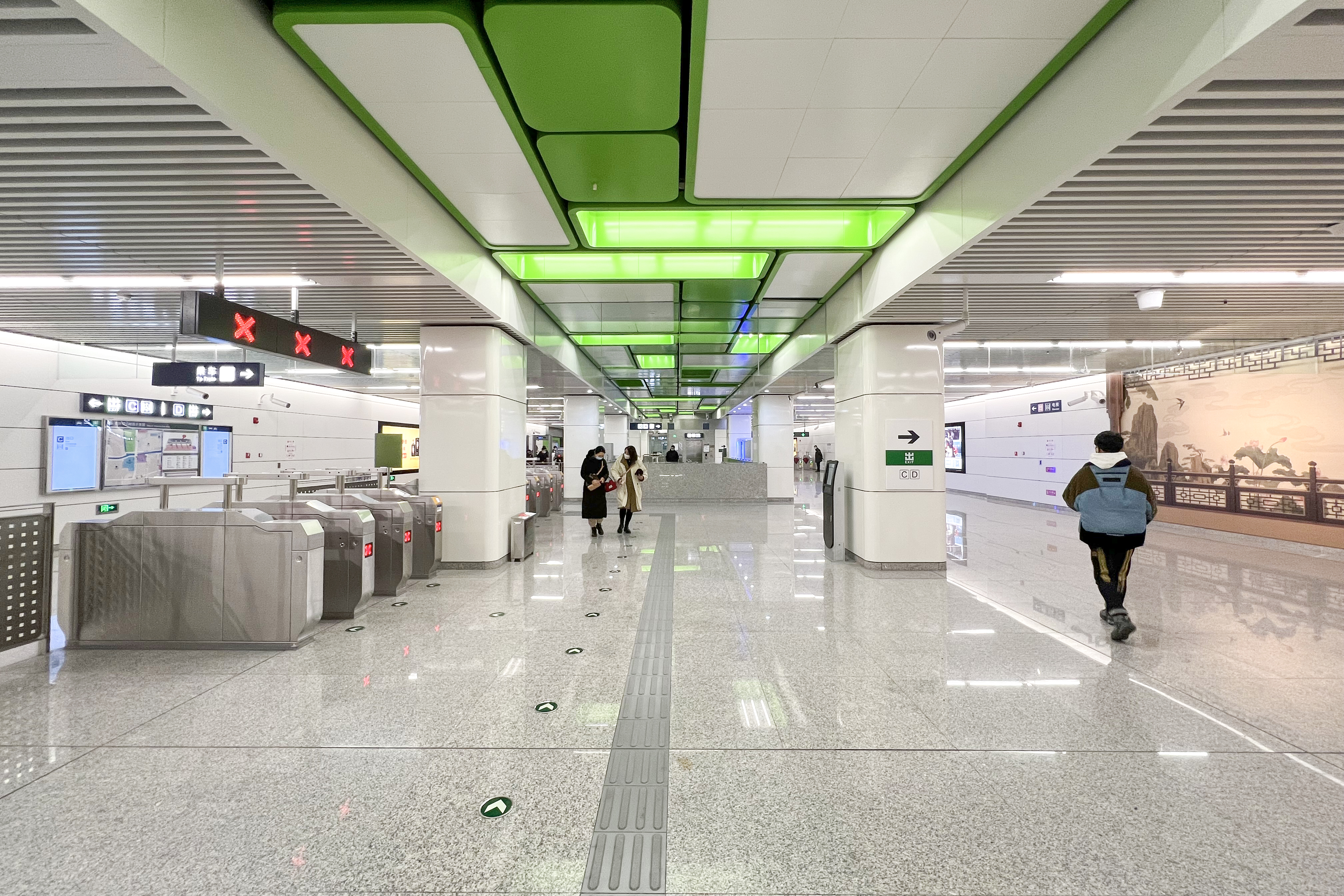
Concourse

== Exits ==
There are 2 exits, lettered C and D. Exit C is accessible via an elevator.
