= Donggaodi station =

Beijing Subway station

Donggaodi 东高地
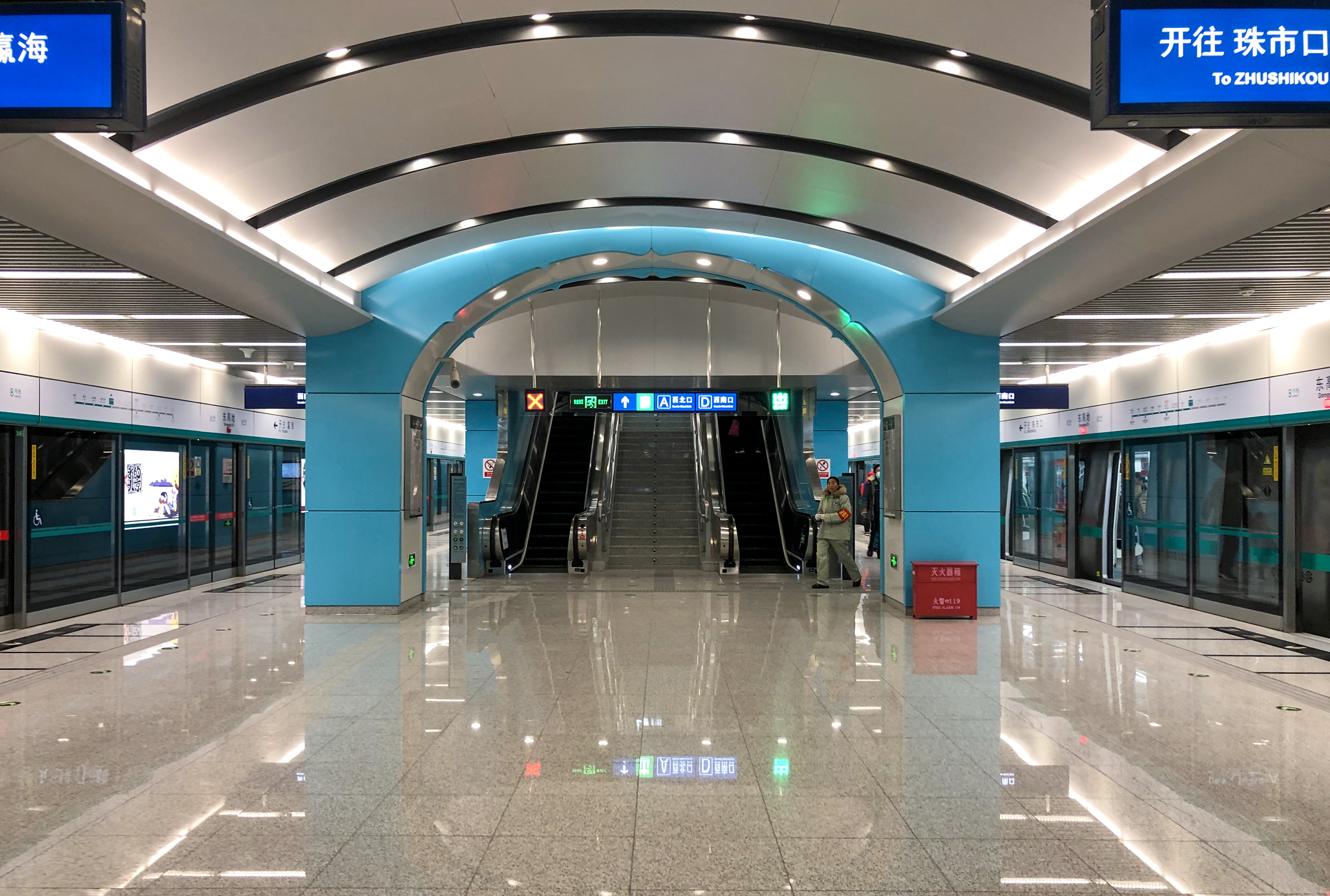
- Platform

General information
- Other names: Xiwadi (西洼地)
- Location: Donggaodi Subdistrict, Fengtai District, Beijing; China
- Operator: Beijing Mass Transit Railway Operation Corporation Limited
- Line: Line 8
- Platforms: 2 (1 island platform)
- Tracks: 2

Construction
- Structure type: Underground
- Accessible: Yes

History
- Opened: December 30, 2018; 7 years ago

Services
Preceding station	Beijing Subway	Following station
Heyi towards Zhuxinzhuang	Line 8	Huojian Wanyuan towards Yinghai
Location
- Location within Beijing

Donggaodi station (Chinese: 东高地站; pinyin: Dōnggāodì zhàn) is a station on Line 8 of the Beijing Subway. It opened on December 30, 2018.

== Station layout ==
The station has an underground island platform.

== Exits ==
There are 3 exits, lettered A, B, and D. Exit B is accessible.
