= Huaxiang =

Huaxiang may refer to the following locations in China:

- Huaxiang Road Subdistrict (花亭路街道), Daguan District, Anqing, Anhui
- Huaxiang Subdistrict (花乡街道), in Fengtai District, Beijing
- Huaxiang Township, Donglan County (花香乡), Guangxi
- Huaxiang Town, Linwu County (香花镇), Hunan

Huaxiang may also refer to:

- Huaxiang Dongqiao station, in Fengtai District, Beijing, China
- Huaxiang station, in Shenyang, China
- Huaxiang tea, a variety of insect tea
- Huaxiang Christian Church, in Fuzhou, China: Flower Lane Church
