= Jingfengmen station =

Beijing Subway interchange station

Jingfengmen 景风门
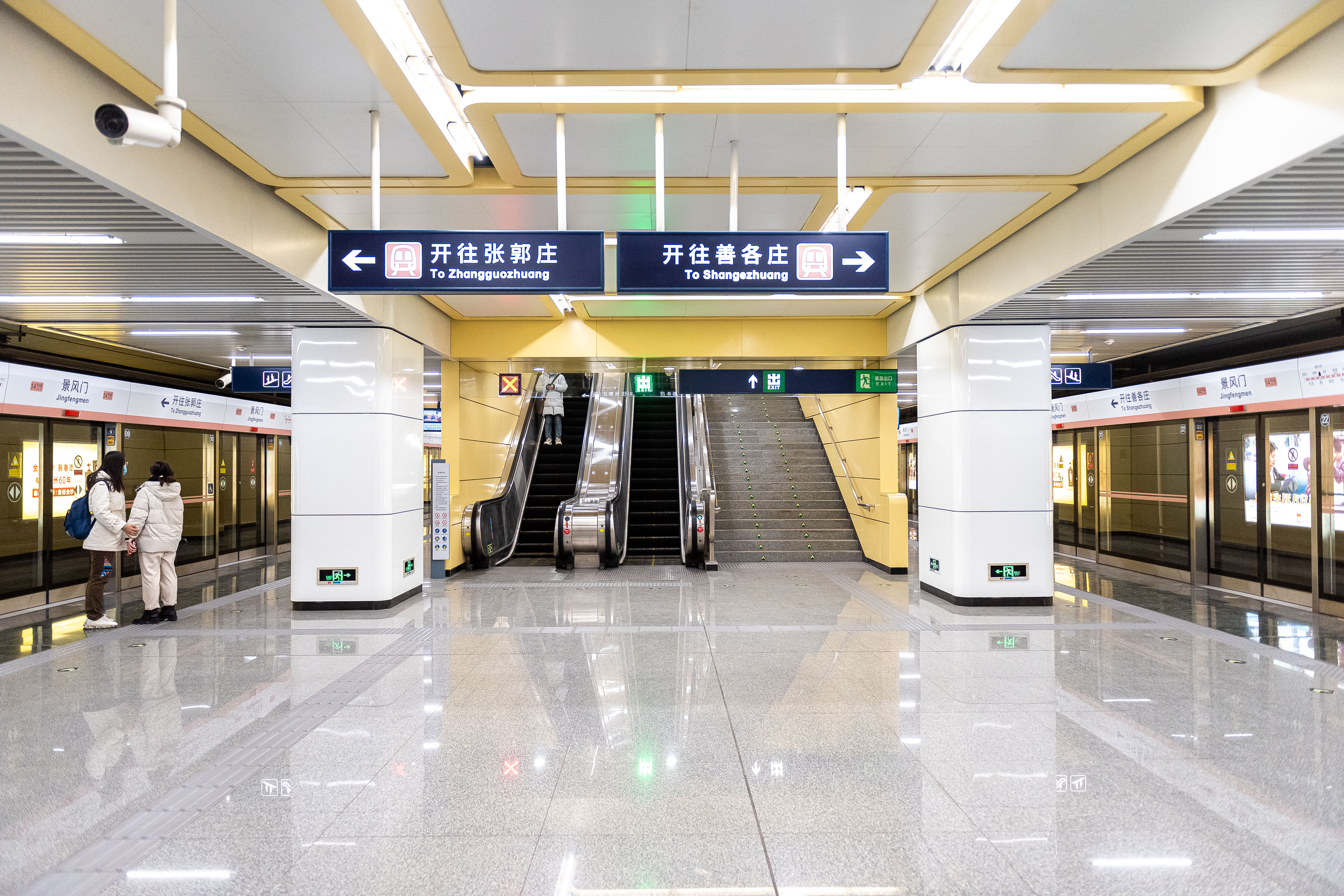
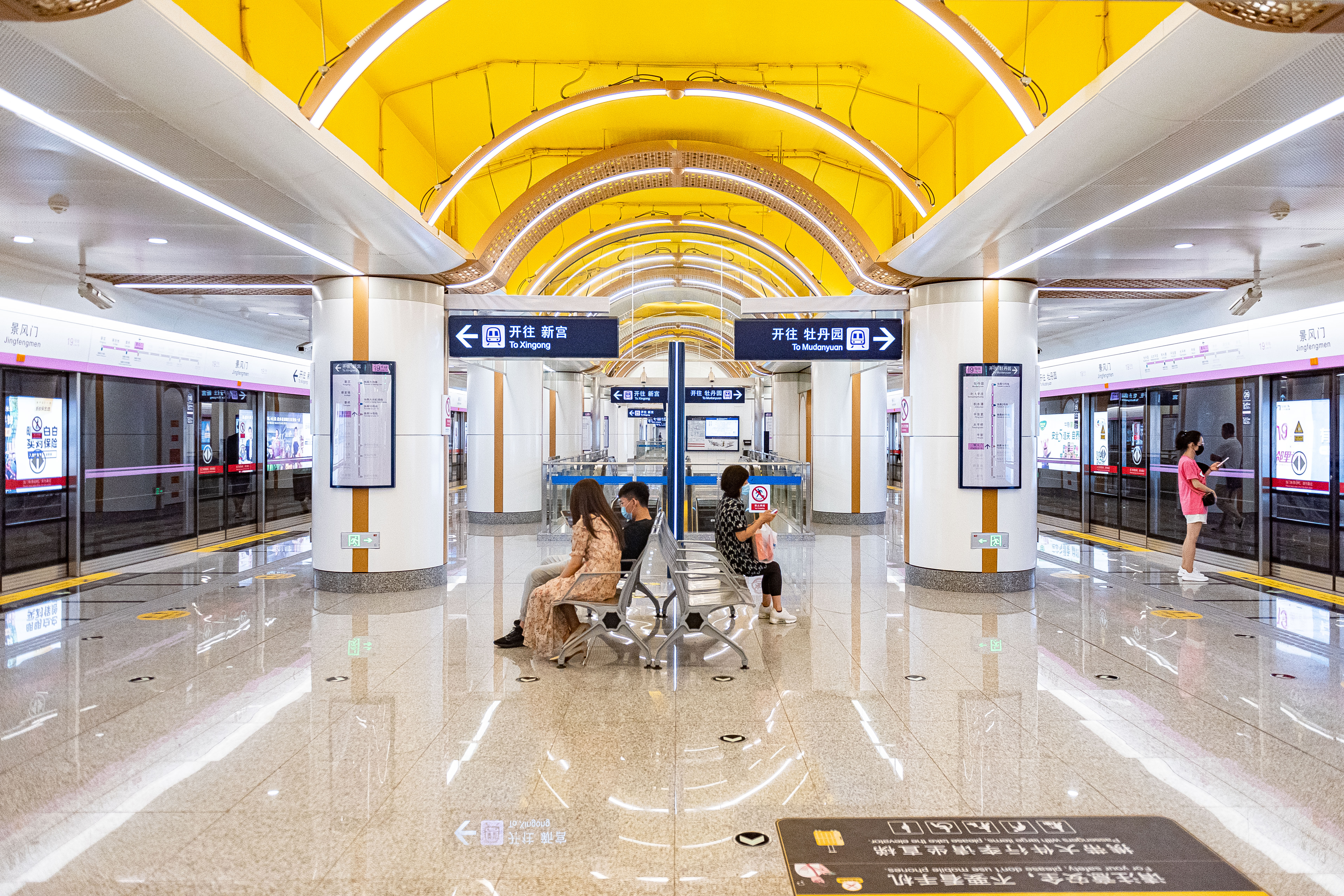
- Line 14 platform Line 19 platform

General information
- Location: Intersection of You'anmen Outer Street and Yulin South Road; You'anmen Subdistrict, Fengtai District, Beijing; China
- Coordinates: 39°51′46″N 116°21′57″E
- Operator: Beijing MTR Corporation Limited (Line 14); Beijing Metro Operation Administration (BJMOA) Corporation Limited (Line 19)
- Lines: Line 14; Line 19
- Platforms: 4 (2 island platforms)
- Tracks: 4

Construction
- Structure type: Underground
- Accessible: Yes

History
- Opened: December 31, 2021; 4 years ago (Line 14); July 30, 2022; 4 years ago (Line 19)

Services
Preceding station	Beijing Subway	Following station
Xitieying towards Zhangguozhuang	Line 14	Beijing South railway station towards Shangezhuang
Niujie towards Mudanyuan	Line 19	Caoqiao towards Xingong
Location
- Location within Beijing

Jingfengmen station (simplified Chinese: 景风门站; traditional Chinese: 景風門站; pinyin: Jǐngfēngmén zhàn) is a station on Lines 14 and 19 of the Beijing Subway in Fengtai District.

== Opening time ==
Line 14 (middle section): December 31, 2021

Line 19: July 30, 2022

== Description ==
During early planning stages, it was known as You'anmenwai station (右安门外站). In October 2015, it was renamed to Jingfengmen station. The name "Jingfengmen" derives from the old gate in the Jin dynasty capital, Zhongdu.

== Platform layout ==
Both Line 14 and Line 19 stations have underground island platforms.

== Exits ==
There are 4 exits, lettered B, D, E and G. Exit D is accessible via an elevator.

== Nearby ==
- Beijing Liao and Jin Dynasty City Wall Museum, 500 meters west of the metro station

== Gallery ==
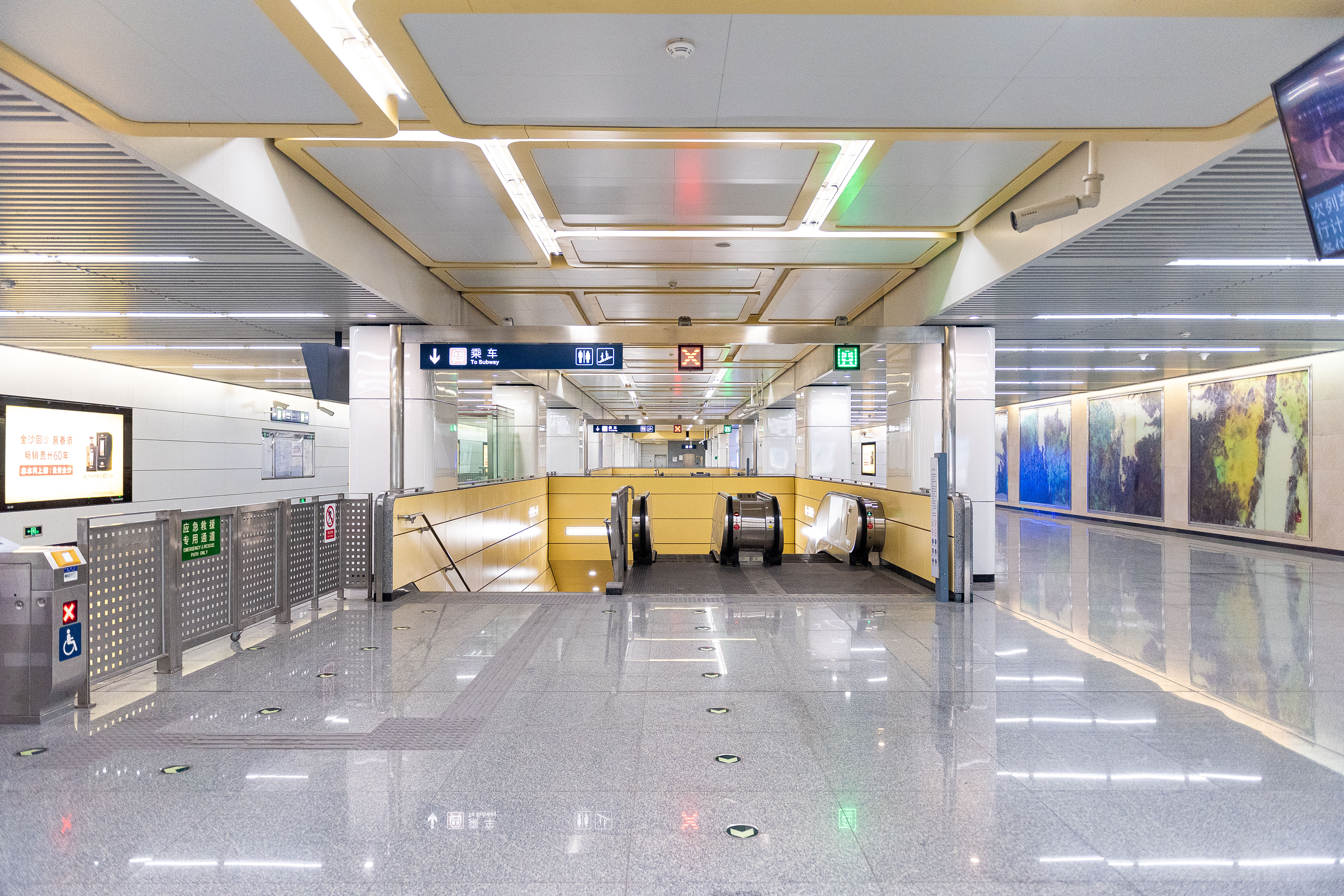
Line 14 concourse

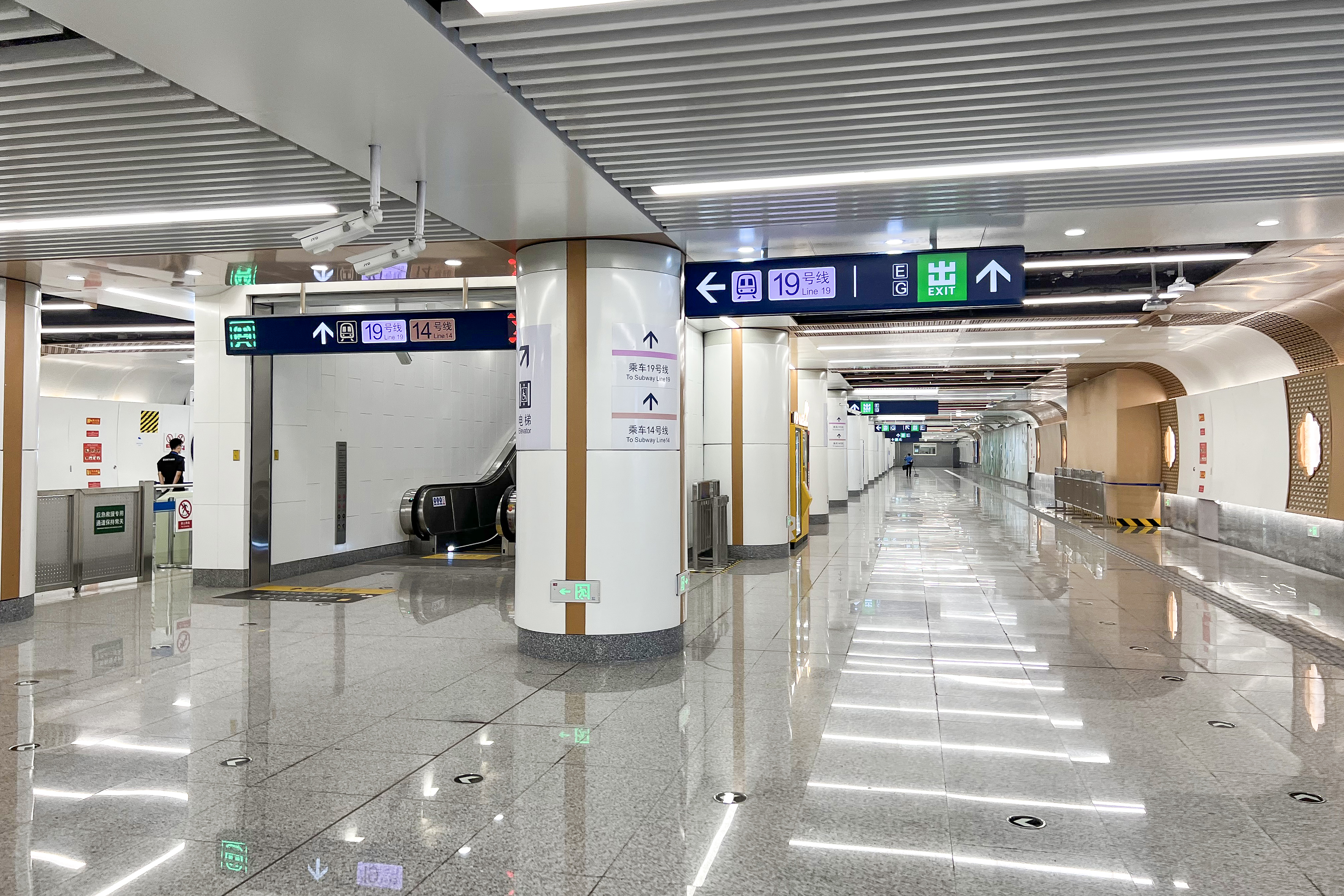
Line 19 concourse
