= Wufutang station =

Beijing Subway station

Wufutang 五福堂
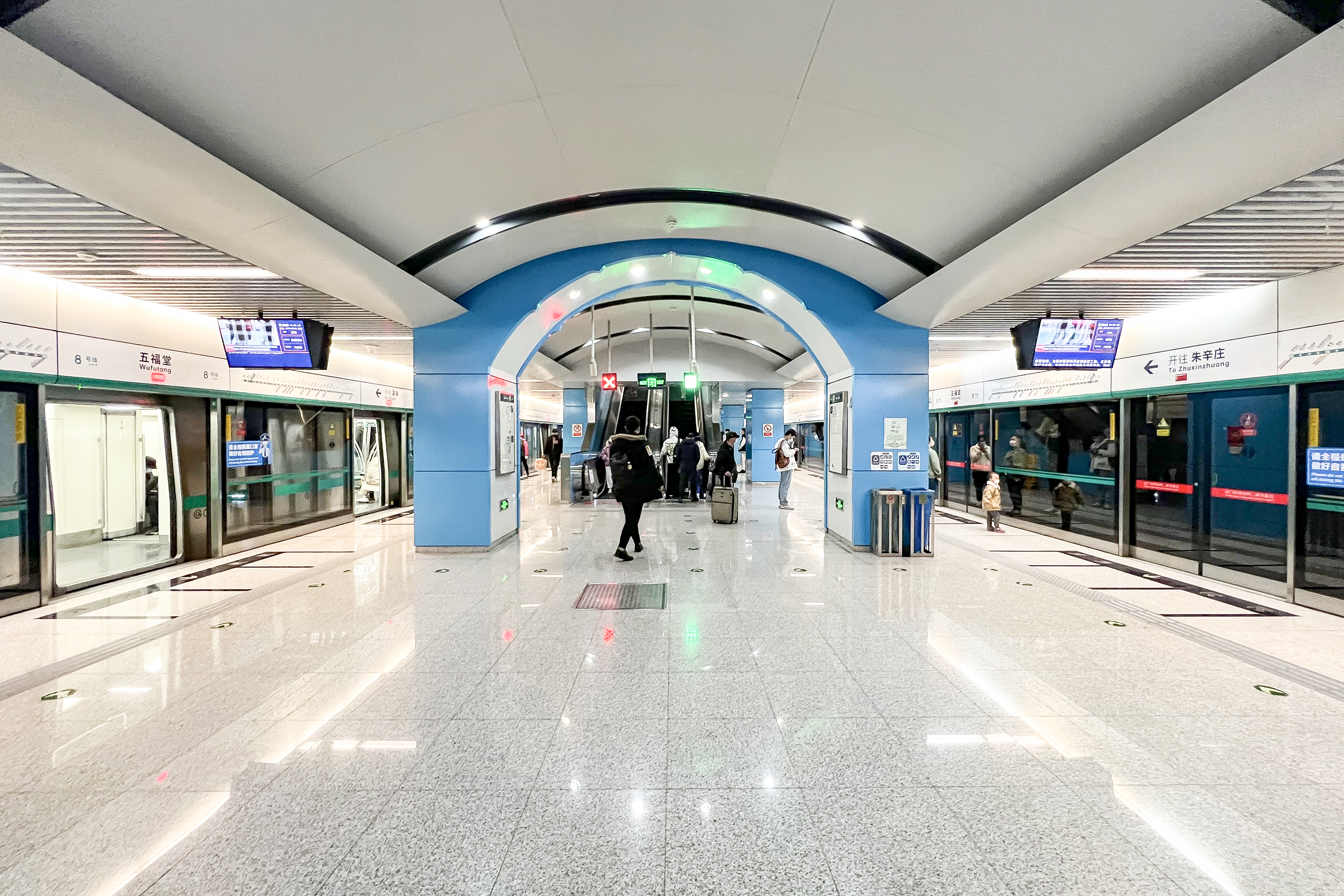
- Platform

General information
- Location: Jiugong, Daxing District, Beijing; China
- Coordinates: 39.783533°N 116.417674°E
- Operator: Beijing Mass Transit Railway Operation Corporation Limited
- Line: Line 8
- Platforms: 2 (1 island platform)
- Tracks: 2

Construction
- Structure type: Underground
- Accessible: Yes

History
- Opened: December 30, 2018; 7 years ago

Services
Preceding station	Beijing Subway	Following station
Huojian Wanyuan towards Zhuxinzhuang	Line 8	Demao towards Yinghai
Location
- Location within Beijing

Wufutang station (Chinese: 五福堂站; pinyin: Wǔfútáng zhàn) is a station on Line 8 of the Beijing Subway. It was opened on December 30, 2018.

== Station layout ==
The station has an underground island platform.

== Exits ==
There are 3 exits, lettered A, C, and D. Exits A and C are accessible.
