= Huojian Wanyuan station =

Beijing Subway station

Huojian Wanyuan 火箭万源
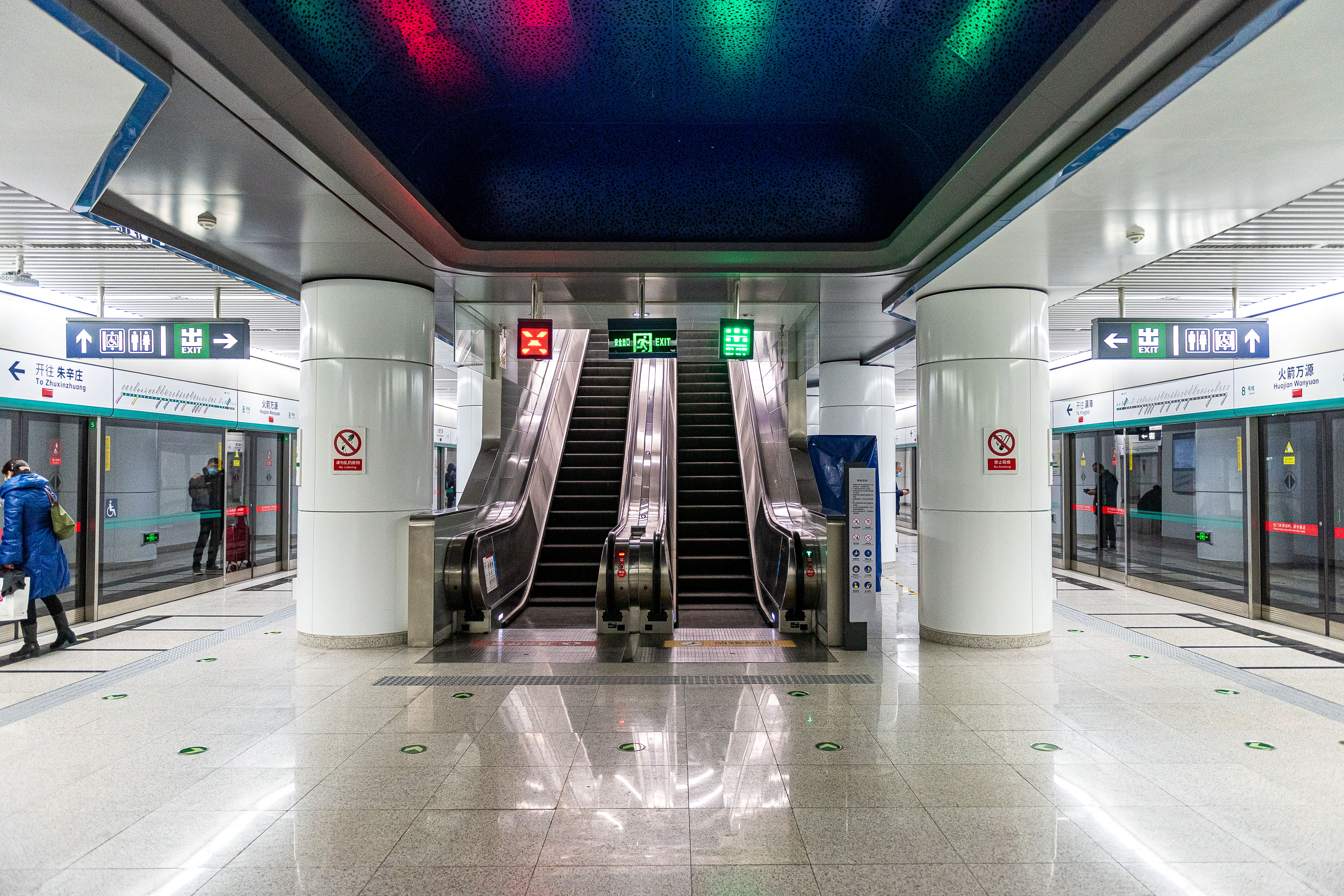
- Platform

General information
- Other names: Liuyingmen (六营门)
- Location: Nandahongmen Rd, Donggaodi Subdistrict, Fengtai District; China
- Coordinates: 39.798706°N 116.411861°E
- Operator: Beijing Mass Transit Railway Operation Corporation Limited
- Line: Line 8
- Platforms: 2 (1 island platform)
- Tracks: 2

Construction
- Structure type: Underground
- Accessible: Yes

History
- Opened: December 30, 2018

Services
Preceding station	Beijing Subway	Following station
Donggaodi towards Zhuxinzhuang	Line 8	Wufutang towards Yinghai
Location
- Location within Beijing

Huojian Wanyuan station (Chinese: 火箭万源站; pinyin: Huǒjiàn Wànyuán zhàn) is a station on Line 8 of the Beijing Subway. It opened on December 30, 2018.

== Station layout ==
The station has an underground island platform.

== Exits ==
There are 4 exits, lettered A1, A2, B, and C Exit B is accessible.
