= Heyi station =

Beijing Subway station

Heyi 和义
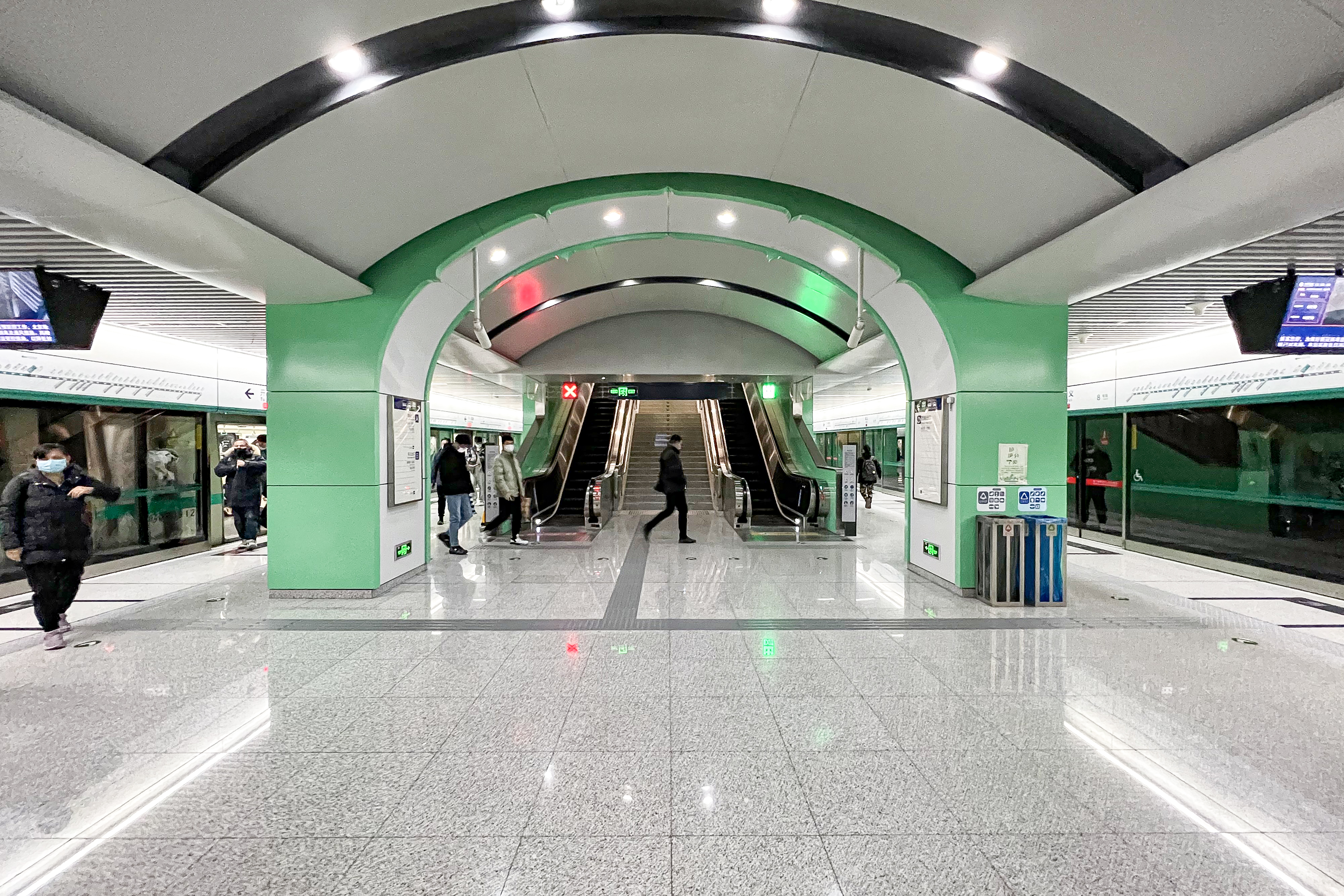
- Platform

General information
- Location: Heyi Subdistrict, Fengtai District, Beijing; China
- Coordinates: 39.813069°N 116.395817°E
- Operator: Beijing Mass Transit Railway Operation Corporation Limited
- Line: Line 8
- Platforms: 2 (1 island platform)
- Tracks: 2

Construction
- Structure type: Underground
- Accessible: Yes

History
- Opened: December 30, 2018

Services
Preceding station	Beijing Subway	Following station
Dahongmen Nan (S) towards Zhuxinzhuang	Line 8	Donggaodi towards Yinghai
Location
- Location within Beijing

Heyi station (Chinese: 和义站; pinyin: Héyì zhàn) is a station on Line 8 of the Beijing Subway. It opened on December 30, 2018.

== Station layout ==
The station has an underground island platform.

== Exits ==
There are 3 exits, lettered A, B, and D. Exit D is accessible.
