= Taipingqiao Subdistrict =

Taipingqiao Subdistrict 太平桥街道
- Subdistrict
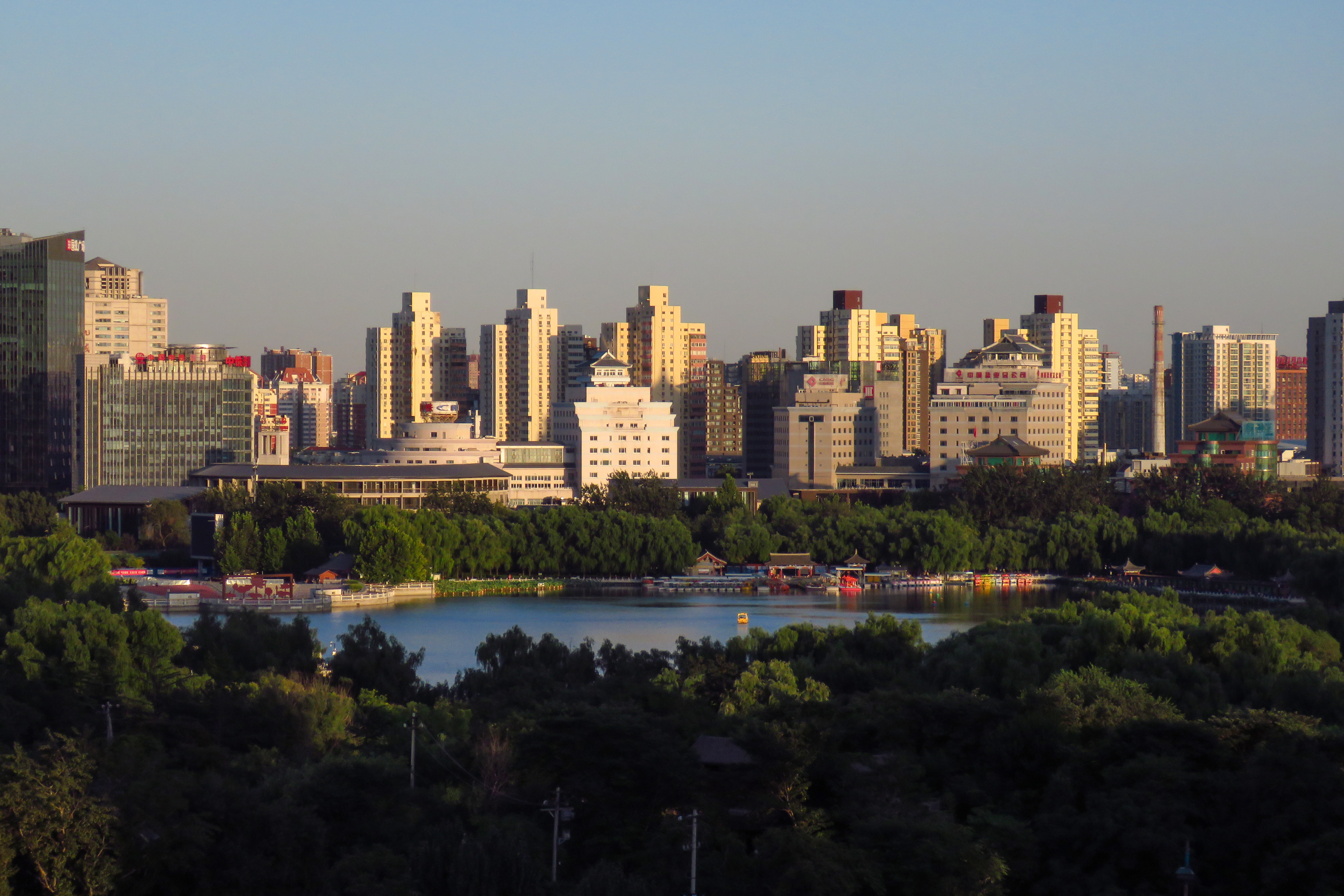
- Lotus Pond Park inside the subdistrict, 2017

- Location within Beijing Location within China
- Coordinates: 39°52′58″N 116°18′50″E
- Country: China
- Municipality: Beijing
- District: Fengtai
- Village-level Divisions: 17 communities 4 village

Area
  - Total: 9.81 km^{2} (3.79 sq mi)

Population (2020)
  - Total: 74,275
  - Density: 7,570/km^{2} (19,600/sq mi)
- Time zone: UTC+8 (China Standard)
- Postal code: 100073
- Area code: 010

Taipingqiao Subdistrict (Chinese: 太平桥街道; pinyin: Tàipíngqiáo Jiēdào) is a subdistrict located at the northern end of Fengtai District, Beijing, China. It shares border with Yangfangdian Subdistrict in the north, Guang'anmenwai and You'anmen Subdistricts in the east, Lugouqiao Subdistrict in the west, and has several exclaves inside of Lugouqiao Township. In 2020, it had a population of 74,275 residents.

The name Taipingqiao (Chinese: 太平桥; lit. 'Peace Bridge') refers to a village in the region that predated the subdistrict.

== History ==
Since the establishment of People's Republic of China in 1949, the land of what would become Taipingqiao Subdistrict had remained part of Lugouqiao Subdistrict for decades. In 1988, the preparation for creating a new subdistrict was started, and the subdistrict was formally established in October 1989.

== Administrative Division ==
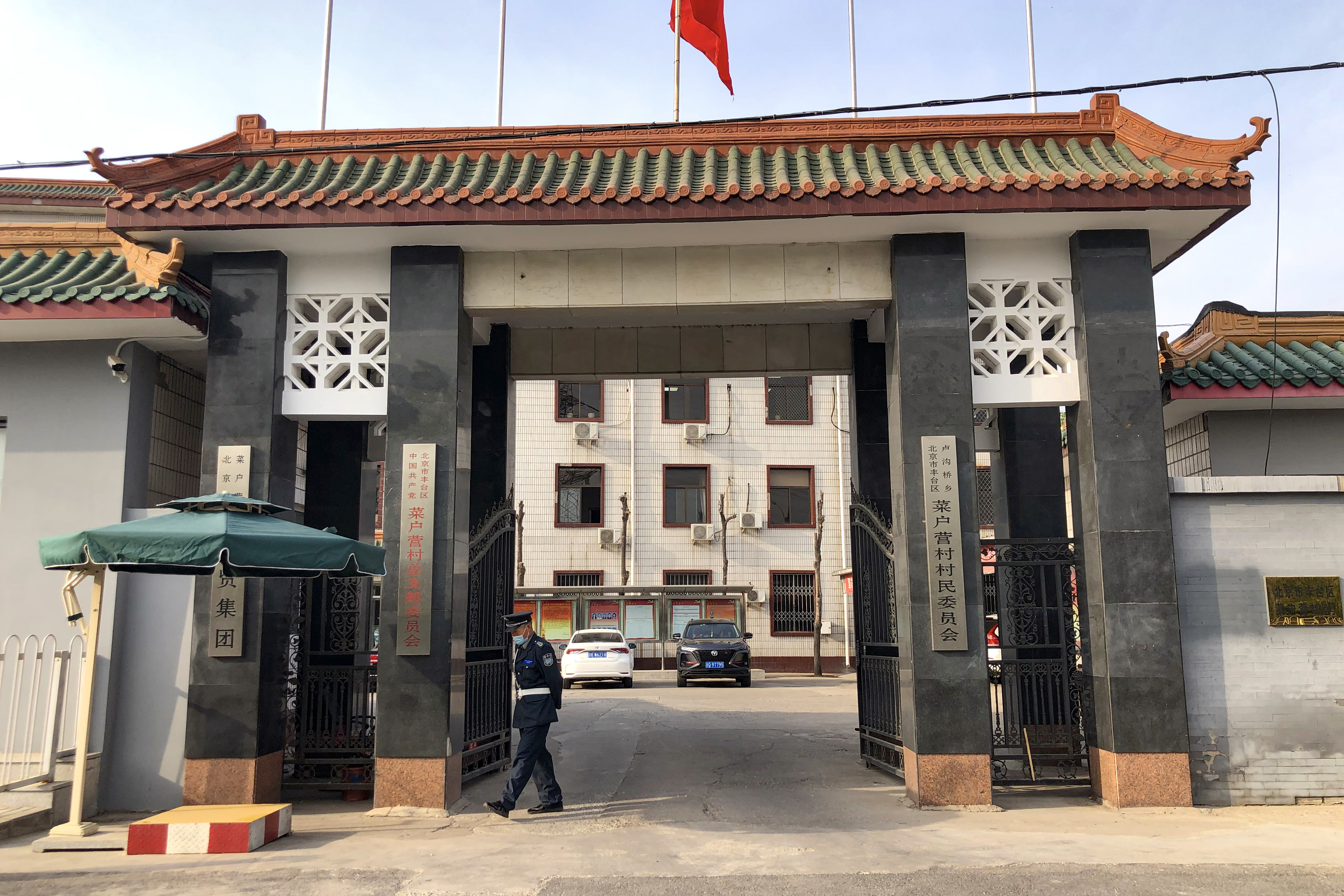
Caihuying (菜户营 ) Villagers' Committee

At the end of 2021, there are 21 subdivisions under Taipingqiao Subdistrict, including 17 communities and 4 villages:

Administrative Division Code	Community Names	Name Transliteration	Type
110106002001	莲花池	Lianhuachi	Community
110106002002	太平桥西里	Taipingqiao Xili	Community
110106002003	太平桥中里	Taipingqiao Zhongli	Community
110106002004	太平桥东里	Taipingqiao Dongli	Community
110106002005	太平桥南里	Taipingqiao Nanli	Community
110106002006	东管头	Dongguantou	Community
110106002007	三路居	Sanluju	Community
110106002008	天伦北里	Tianlun Beili	Community
110106002009	菜户营	Caihuying	Community
110106002010	万泉寺	Wanquansi	Community
110106002011	精图	Jingtu	Community
110106002012	万润	Wanrun	Community
110106002013	首威	Shouwei	Community
110106002014	丽湾	Liwan	Community
110106002015	蓝调	Landiao	Community
110106002016	万泉寺东	Wanquansi Dong	Community
110106002017	金鹏天润	Jinpeng Tianrun	Community
110106002200	太平桥	Taipingqiao	Village
110106002201	马连道	Maliandao	Village
110106002202	万泉寺	Wanquansi	Village
110106002203	菜户营	Caihuying	Village

== Landmark ==
- Lotus Pond Park

== See also ==
- List of township-level divisions of Beijing
