= Xiluoyuan Subdistrict =

Xiluoyuan Subdistrict 西罗园街道
- Subdistrict
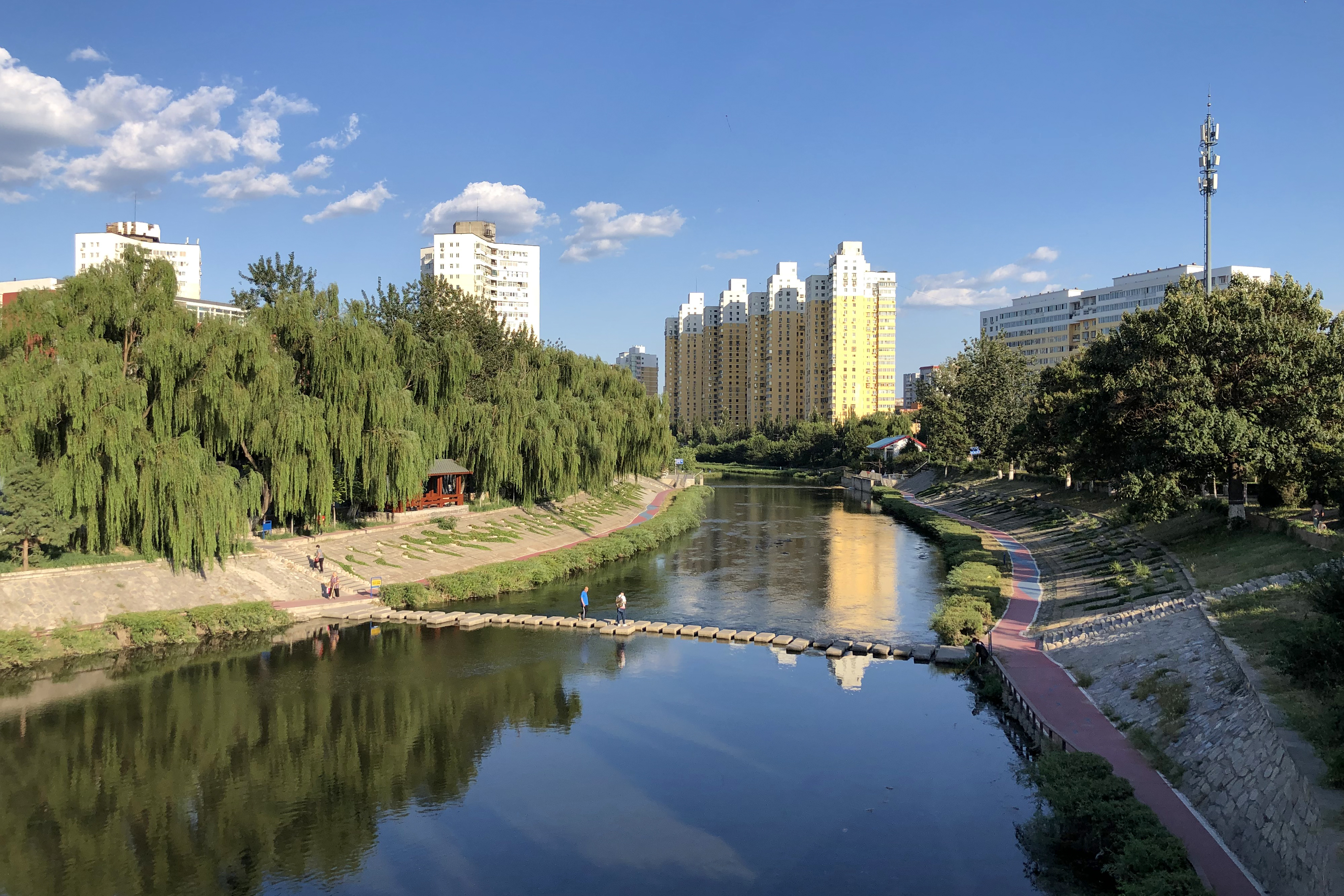
- A section of Liangshui River on the western portion of the subdistrict, 2020

- Location within Beijing Location within China
- Coordinates: 39°51′47″N 116°22′41″E
- Country: China
- Municipality: Beijing
- District: Fengtai
- Village-level Divisions: 24 communities

Area
  - Total: 2.86 km^{2} (1.10 sq mi)

Population (2020)
  - Total: 83,815
  - Density: 29,300/km^{2} (75,900/sq mi)
- Time zone: UTC+8 (China Standard)
- Postal code: 100077
- Area code: 010

Xiluoyuan Subdistrict (Chinese: 西罗园街道; pinyin: Xīluōyuán Jiēdào) is one of the 21 subdivisions of Fengtai District, Beijing, China. It is located on the northeast of Fengtai, borders Yongdingmenwai Subdistrict to the northeast, Dahongmen Subdistrict and Nayuan Township to the south and east, Majiabao Subdistrict and Huaxiang Township to the southwest, and You'anmen Subdistrict to the northwest. It has a population of 83,815 by 2020.

The subdistrict got its current name (Chinese: 西罗园; lit. 'West Luo Manor') due to its origin as an estate of Luo family during Ming dynasty, which was later split into east and west portion as inheritances to two brothers.

== History ==
Timeline of changes to status of Xiluoyuan Subdistrict
Years	Status
1949	Part of Nanyuan District
1958	Part of Dahongmen and You'anmen Subdistricts, under Nanyuan Township
1983	Residential area was constructed within the region
1988	Formally established as Xiluoyuan Subdistrict

== Administrative Division ==
By 2023, the subdistrict is divided into 24 residential communities:

Administrative Division Code	Community Names	Name Transliteration
110106003001	西罗园第一	Xiluoyuan Diyi
110106003002	西罗园第二	Xiluoyuan Di'er
110106003003	西罗园第三	Xiluoyuan Disan
110106003004	西罗园第四	Xiluoyuan Disi
110106003005	洋桥北里	Yangqiao Beili
110106003006	洋桥西里	Yangqiao Xili
110106003007	海户西里北	Haihu Xili Bei
110106003008	角门东里一	Jiaomen Dongli Yi
110106003009	花椒树	Huajiaoshu
110106003010	马家堡东里	Majiabao Dongli
110106003011	鑫福里	Xinfuli
110106003012	洋桥村	Yangqiaocun
110106003013	洋桥东里	Yangqiao Dongli
110106003014	海户西里南	Haihu XIli Nan
110106003015	角门东里二	Jiaomen Dongli Er
110106003016	四路通	Silutong
110106003017	角门东里三	Jiaomen Dongli San
110106003018	西马场北里	Ximachang Beili
110106003019	怡然家园	Yiran Jiayuan
110106003020	西马小区	Xima Xiaoqu
110106003021	金润家园一	Jinrun Jiayuanyi
110106003022	福海棠华苑	Fuhaitang Huayuan
110106003023	金润家园二	Jinrun Jiayuaner
110106003024	金润家园三	Jinrun Jiayuansan

== See also ==
- List of township-level divisions of Beijing
