= Lotus Pond Park =

Urban park in Beijing, China

Coordinates: 39.8928°N 116.3156°E

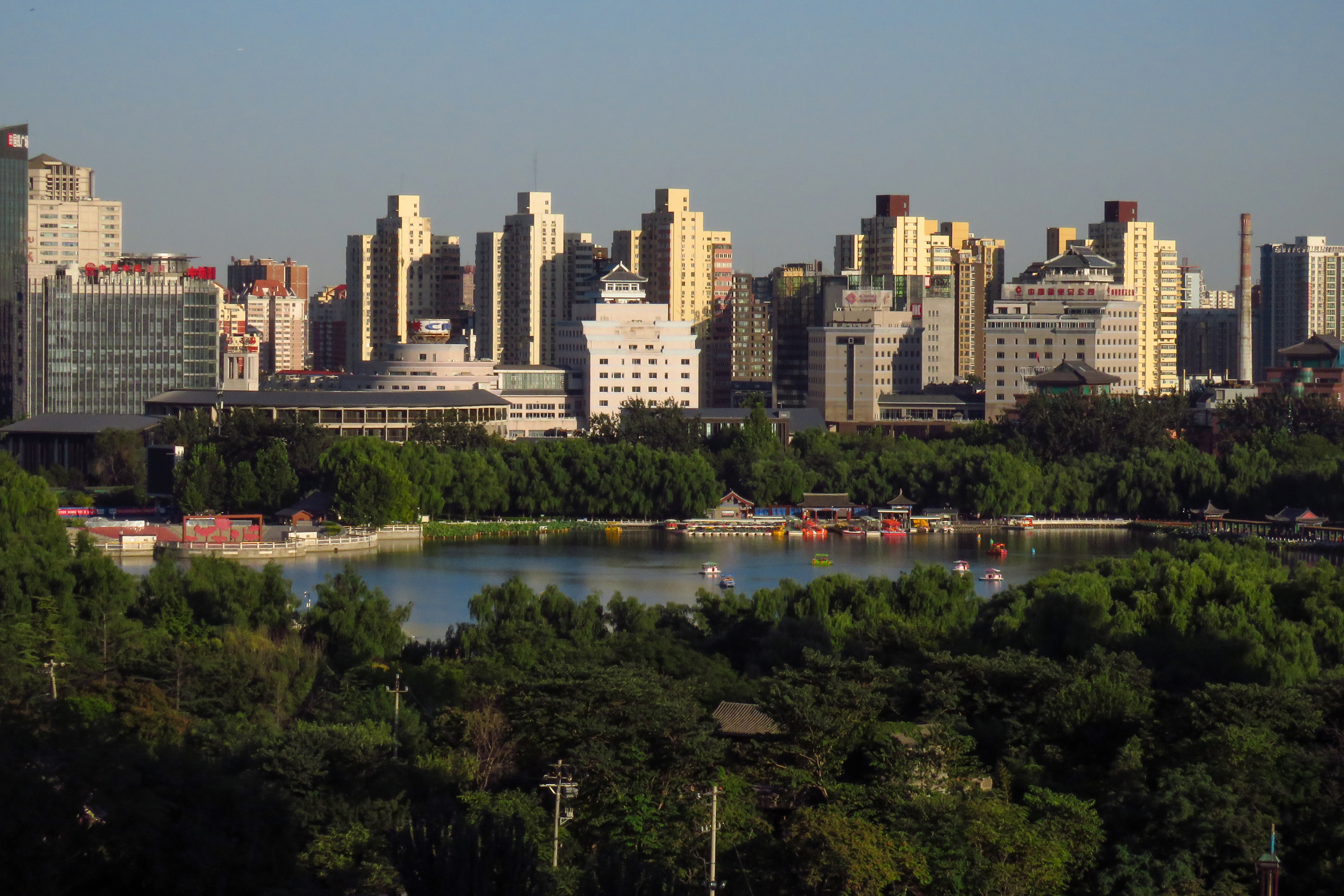
- View from Huabao Mansion in 2017

- Location within Beijing Location within China
- Type: Urban park
- Location: Beijing, China
- Area: 53.6 hectares (132 acres)
- Created: 1045 B.C.(as water source); 16th century (as imperial garden); 1982 (as city park)
- Owner: Fengtai District, Beijing
- Status: Open all year

Lotus Pond Park (known as Lianhuachi Park) is a major urban park in Beijing, China. It is located in the western part of the city and covers an area of around 53.6 hectares. It is right next to the Beijing West railway station and the Third Ring Road. The main part of this park is the lake of Lianhuachi, which literally means Lotus Pond. This lake is believed to be the most important water source of ancient Beijing city since the Zhou dynasty. As mentioned in the Commentary on the Water Classic, a masterpiece of geographic record in ancient China, water from this lake supported Beijing from the very beginning of the city history until the Yuan dynasty (1276–1368), during which the city of Beijing was rebuilt and shifted towards northeast a bit, and the lake lost its importance as the water source.

During the Ming and Qing dynasties, the lake became an attraction outside of Beijing. It gradually became the place for the royal family and noblemen to enjoy the nature. In 1982, the Beijing government rebuilt this park and made it one of the major urban parks in the city. In 2000, the park was largely renovated, and many landscapes and scenic areas were added to it.
