= Dahongmen Subdistrict =

Dahongmen Subdistrict 大红门街道
- Subdistrict
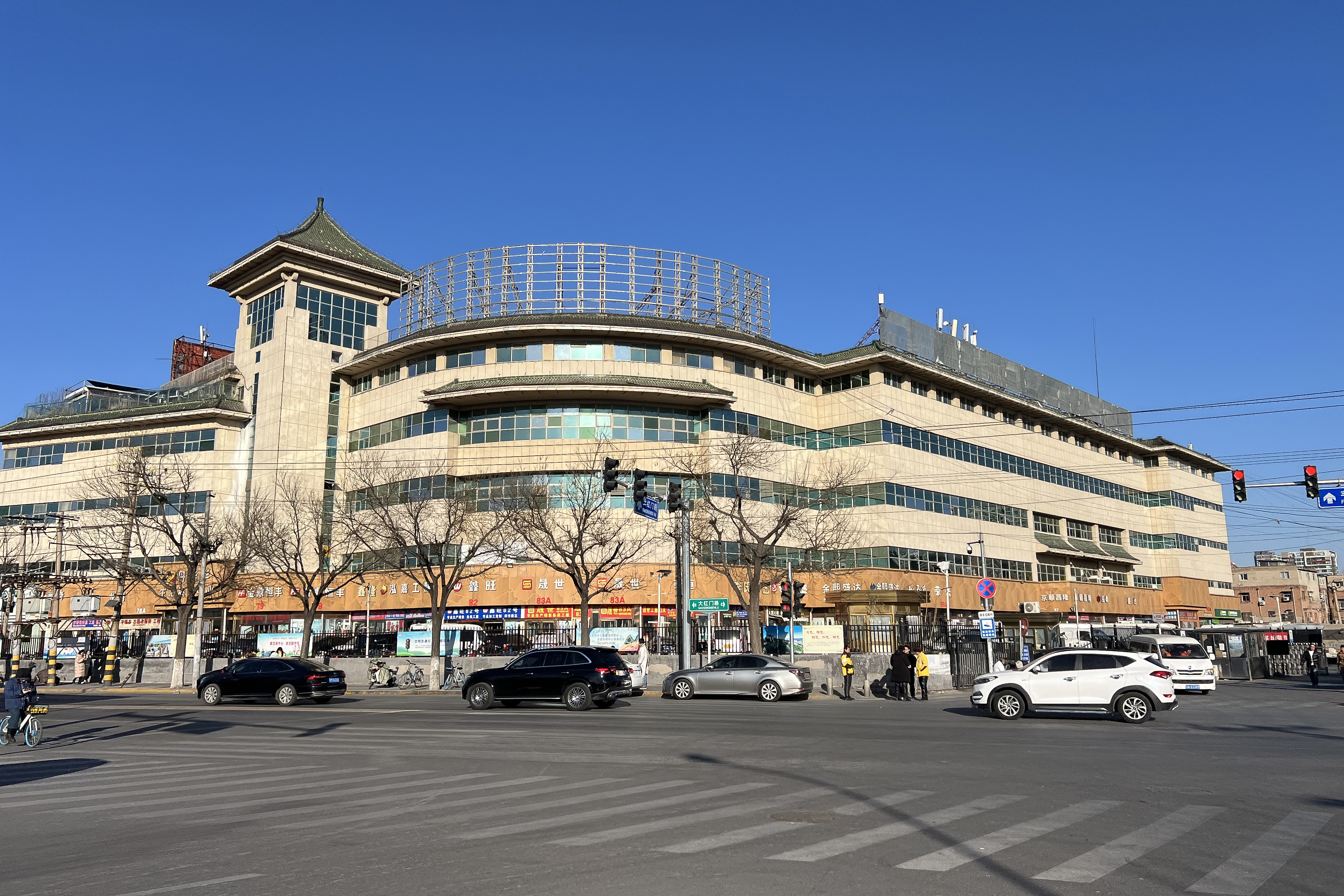
- Danbihua Market within the subdistrict, 2024

- Location within Beijing Location within China
- Coordinates: 39°50′15″N 116°24′03″E
- Country: China
- Municipality: Beijing
- District: Fengtai
- Village-level Divisions: 19 communities 2 village

Area
  - Total: 9.6 km^{2} (3.7 sq mi)

Population (2020)
  - Total: 177,946
  - Density: 19,000/km^{2} (48,000/sq mi)
- Time zone: UTC+8 (China Standard)
- Postal code: 100075
- Area code: 010

Dahongmen Subdistrict (Chinese: 大红门街道; pinyin: Dàhóngmén Jiēdào) is a subdistrict on the east side of Fengtai District, Beijing, China. It borders Xiluoyuan Subdistrict to the north, Xiaohongmen Township to the east, Nanyuan Township to the south, Majiabao Subdistrict to the west, and contains exclaves of Nanyuan Township within. The result of the 2020 Census determined the population to be at 177,946.

This subdistrict's name (Chinese: 大红门; lit. 'Big Red Gate') referred to a former gate of Imperial Garden that once existed in this region during the Ming and Qing dynasty.

== History ==
History of Dahongmen Subdistrict
Years	Status
Before 1949	Part of Daxing County
1949	Part of the 14th District
1957	Established as Dahongmen Township
1958	Became part of People's Commune of Nanyuan and transferred under Fengtai District
1960	Separated from Nanyuan and formed its own People's Commune
1966	Restructured into Dahongmen Subdistrict

== Administrative Division ==
In 2023, Dahongmen has direct jurisdiction over 21 subdivisions, of which 19 are communities and 2 are villages:

Administrative Division Code	Community Names	Name Transliteration	Type
110106004001	西罗园南里	Xiluoyuan Nanli	Community
110106004002	西罗园南里果园	Xiluoyuan Nanli Guoyuan	Community
110106004003	西罗园南里华远	Xiluoyuan Nanli Huayuan	Community
110106004004	海户屯	Haihutun	Community
110106004005	木樨园南里	Muxiyuan Nanli	Community
110106004006	东罗园	Dongluoyuan	Community
110106004007	南顶村	Nandingcun	Community
110106004008	南顶路	Nanding Lu	Community
110106004009	康泽园	Kangzeyuan	Community
110106004010	时村	Shicun	Community
110106004015	大红门东街	Dahongmen Dongjie	Community
110106004017	苗圃东里	Miaopu Dongli	Community
110106004018	苗圃西里	Miaopu Xili	Community
110106004019	西马场南里	Ximachang Nanli	Community
110106004022	建欣苑	Jianxinyuan	Community
110106004028	远洋自然	Yuanyang Ziran	Community
110106004029	光彩路	Guangcai Lu	Community
110106004031	彩虹城第二	Caihongcheng Di'er	Community
110106004032	建欣苑东区	Jianxinyuan Dongqu	Community
110106004201	东罗园	Dongluoyuan	Village
110106004202	时	Shi	Village

== See also ==
- List of township-level divisions of Beijing
