= Dahongmen Nan (S) station =

Beijing Subway station

Dahongmen Nan (S) 大红门南
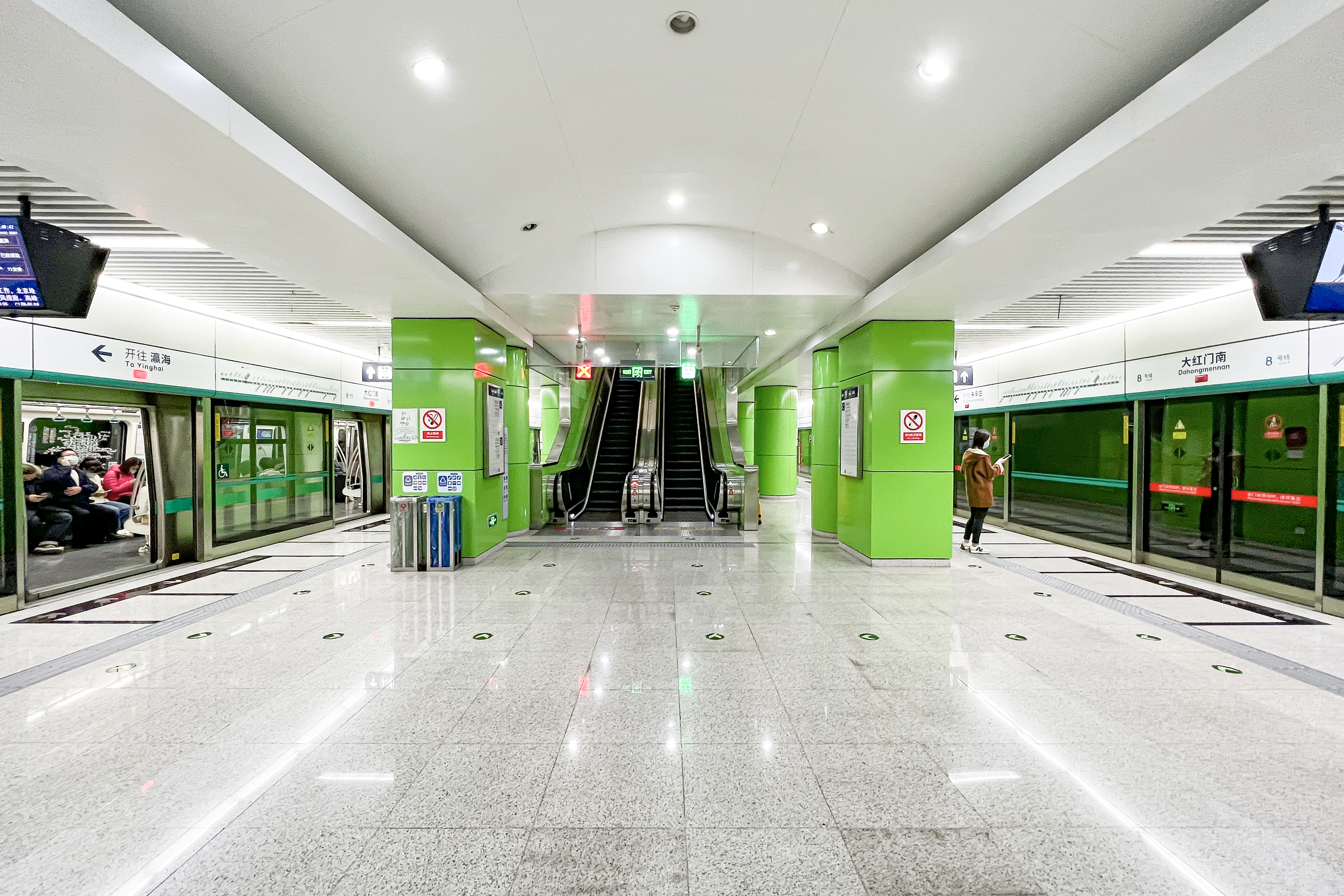
- Platform

General information
- Other names: Dahongmen Nan (South), Dahongmennan
- Location: Nanyuan Road (南苑路) × Dahongmen Road (大红门路) & Dahongmen West Road (大红门西路); Dahongmen Subdistrict, Fengtai District, Beijing; China
- Coordinates: 39.835265°N 116.394849°E
- Operator: Beijing Mass Transit Railway Operation Corporation Limited
- Line: Line 8
- Platforms: 2 (1 island platform)
- Tracks: 2

Construction
- Structure type: Underground
- Accessible: Yes

History
- Opened: December 30, 2018

Services
Preceding station	Beijing Subway	Following station
Dahong Men towards Zhuxinzhuang	Line 8	Heyi towards Yinghai
Location
- Location within Beijing

Dahongmen Nan (S) station (Chinese: 大红门南站; pinyin: Dàhóngmén Nán zhàn) is a station on Line 8 of the Beijing Subway. It opened on December 30, 2018.

== Station layout ==
The station has an underground island platform.

== Exits ==
There are 3 exits, lettered A, B, and C. Exit C is accessible.
