= You'anmen Subdistrict =

You'anmen Subdistrict 右安门街道
- Subdistrict
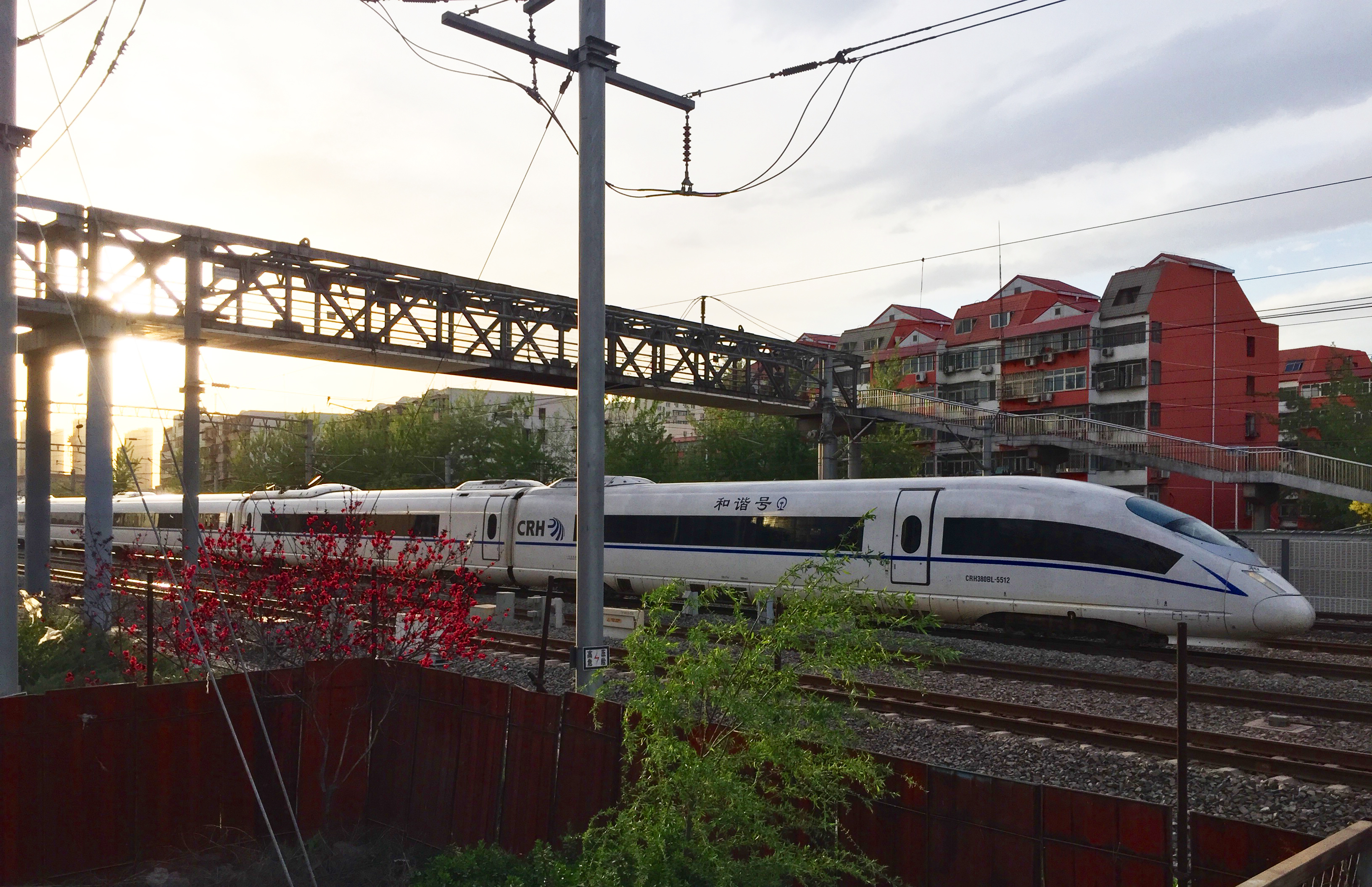
- Elevated high-speed railway within the subdistrict, 2016

- Location within Beijing Location within China
- Coordinates: 39°51′35″N 116°21′51″E
- Country: China
- Municipality: Beijing
- District: Fengtai
- Village-level Divisions: 18 communities 2 village

Area
  - Total: 4.32 km^{2} (1.67 sq mi)

Population (2020)
  - Total: 73,499
  - Density: 17,000/km^{2} (44,100/sq mi)
- Time zone: UTC+8 (China Standard)
- Postal code: 100069
- Area code: 010

You'anmen Subdistrict (Chinese: 右安门街道; pinyin: Yòu'ānmén Jiēdào) is one of the 25 subdistricts of Fengtai District, Beijing, China. It is located on the eastern part of Fengtai, south of Baizhifang and Taoranting Subdistricts, west of Yongdingmenwai Subdistrict, north of Xiluoyuan Subdistrict, and east of Nanyuan, Lugouqiao and Taipingqiao Townships. The subdistrict is home to a population of 73,499 as of 2020.

The subdistrict got its name You'anmen (Chinese: 右安门; lit. 'Right Peace Gate') from the former city gate of Beijing's outer city wall that used to stand in the region.

== History ==
Timeline of You'anmen Subdistrict
Years	Status
1912	Part of the 3rd Suburban District of Beijing
1949	Part of the 14th District
1950	Part of the 11th District
1952	Part of the Nanyuan District
1957	Established as You'anmen Subdistrict
1958	Transferred under Fengtai District
1987	Area east and south of Jingfeng railway was transferred to Xiluoyuan Subdistrict
2007	Incorporated part of Huayuan Village, Nanyuan Township
2010	Land east of Caihuying South Road was transferred to Taipingqiao Subdistrict in exchange for area west of Caihuying South Road

== Administrative Division ==
As of 2023, You'anmen Subdistrict is divided into 20 subdivisions, with 18 communities and 2 villages:

Administrative Division Code	Community Names	Name Transliteration	Type
110106001001	翠林一里	Cuilin Yili	Community
110106001002	翠林二里	Cuilin Erli	Community
110106001003	翠林三里	Cuilin Sanli	Community
110106001004	玉林里	Yulinli	Community
110106001005	玉林西里	Yulin Xili	Community
110106001006	西铁营	Xitieying	Community
110106001007	东滨河路	Dongbinhe Lu	Community
110106001008	东庄	Dongzhuang	Community
110106001009	玉林东里一区	Yulin Dongli Yiqu	Community
110106001010	玉林东里二区	Yulin Dongli Erqu	Community
110106001011	玉林东里三区	Yulin Dongli Sanqu	Community
110106001012	永乐	Yongle	Community
110106001013	开阳里第一	Kaiyangli Diyi	Community
110106001014	开阳里第二	Kaiyangli Di'er	Community
110106001015	开阳里第三	Kaiyangli Disan	Community
110106001016	开阳里第四	Kaiyangli Disi	Community
110106001017	亚林苑一	Yalinyuan Yi	Community
110106001018	亚林苑二	Yalinyuan Er	Community
110106001200	西铁营	Xitieying	Village
110106001201	右安门	You'anmen	Village

== Landmark ==
- Beijing Liao and Jin City Wall Museum

== See also ==
- List of township-level divisions of Beijing
