= Yongdingmenwai Subdistrict =

Yongdingmenwai Subdistrict 永定门外街道
- Subdistrict
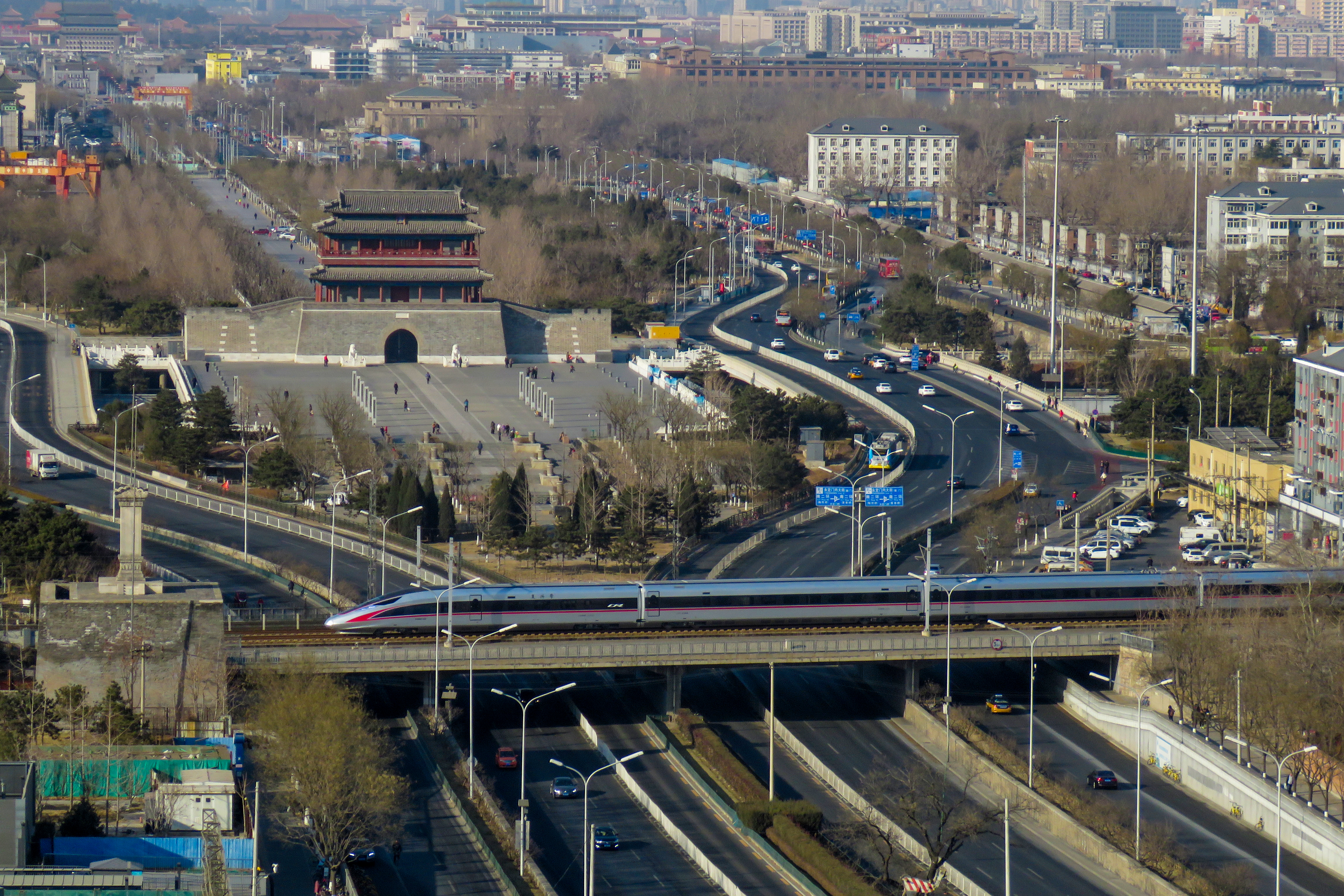
- Highspeed railway in the Yongdingmenwai subdistrict

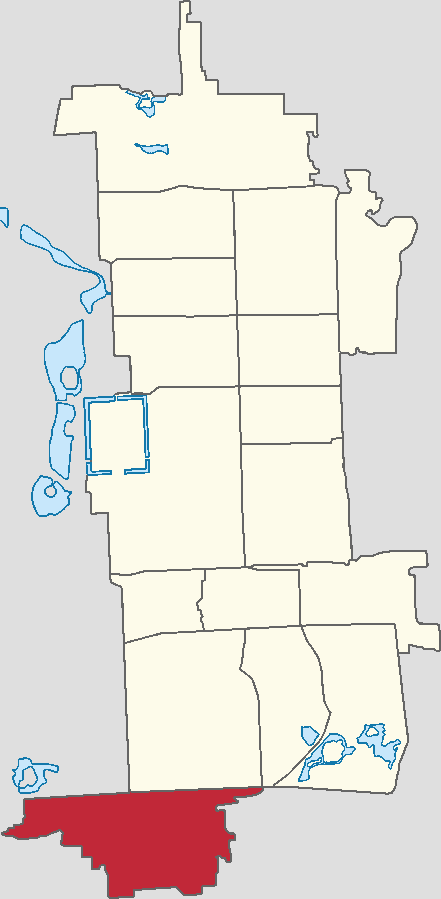
- Location of Yongdingmenwai Subdistrict within Dongcheng District

- Location within Beijing Location within China
- Coordinates: 39°51′51″N 116°24′7″E
- Country: China
- Municipality: Beijing
- District: Dongcheng

Area
  - Total: 3.33 km^{2} (1.29 sq mi)

Population (2020)
  - Total: 64,790
  - Density: 19,500/km^{2} (50,400/sq mi)
- Time zone: UTC+8 (China Standard)
- Postal code: 100075
- Area code: 010

Yongdingmenwai Subdistrict (Chinese: 永定门外街道; pinyin: Yǒngdìngménwài Jiēdào) is a subdistrict in the southern part of Dongcheng District, Beijing, China. By the year 2020, it has a population of 64,790.

The subdistrict got its name from Yongdingmen (Chinese: 永定门; lit. 'Gate of Perpetual Peace'), a former front gate on the Beijing city wall.

== History ==
Timeline of the changes in status of Yongdingmenwai
| Year | Status |
|---|---|
| 1944 | Part of Yongwai Borough, Nanyuan District |
| 1952 | Part of Chongwen District. Two subdistricts were created: Yongdingmenwai and Liulijing. |
| 1955 | 12 surrounding villages and streets were incorporated |
| 1958 | 2 subdistricts merged into Yongdingmenwai Subdistrict |

== Administrative Division ==
As of 2021, There are a total of 19 communities within the subdistrict:

| Administrative Division Code | Community Name in English | Community Name in Chinese |
|---|---|---|
| 110101017001 | Pengzhuang | 彭庄 |
| 110101017002 | Zhonghai Ziyu | 中海紫御 |
| 110101017004 | Bairongjiayuan | 百荣嘉园 |
| 110101017005 | Guancun | 管村 |
| 110101017006 | Taoyuan | 桃园 |
| 110101017007 | Minzhubeijie | 民主北街 |
| 110101017008 | Liulijing | 琉璃井 |
| 110101017009 | Taoyanglu | 桃杨路 |
| 110101017010 | Yangjiayuan | 杨家园 |
| 110101017011 | Licun | 李村 |
| 110101017012 | Baohuali | 宝华里 |
| 110101017013 | Ding'anli | 定安里 |
| 110101017014 | Anlelin | 安乐林 |
| 110101017015 | Jingtai | 景泰 |
| 110101017016 | Yongtieyuan | 永铁苑 |
| 110101017017 | Tiantian Jiayuan | 天天家园 |
| 110101017018 | Fulaiyin | 富莱茵 |
| 110101017019 | Gexinxili | 革新西里 |
| 110101017020 | Gexinli | 革新里 |

== Landmarks ==
- Yongdingmen
