= Huaxiang Subdistrict =

Huaxiang Subdistrict 花乡街道
- Subdistrict
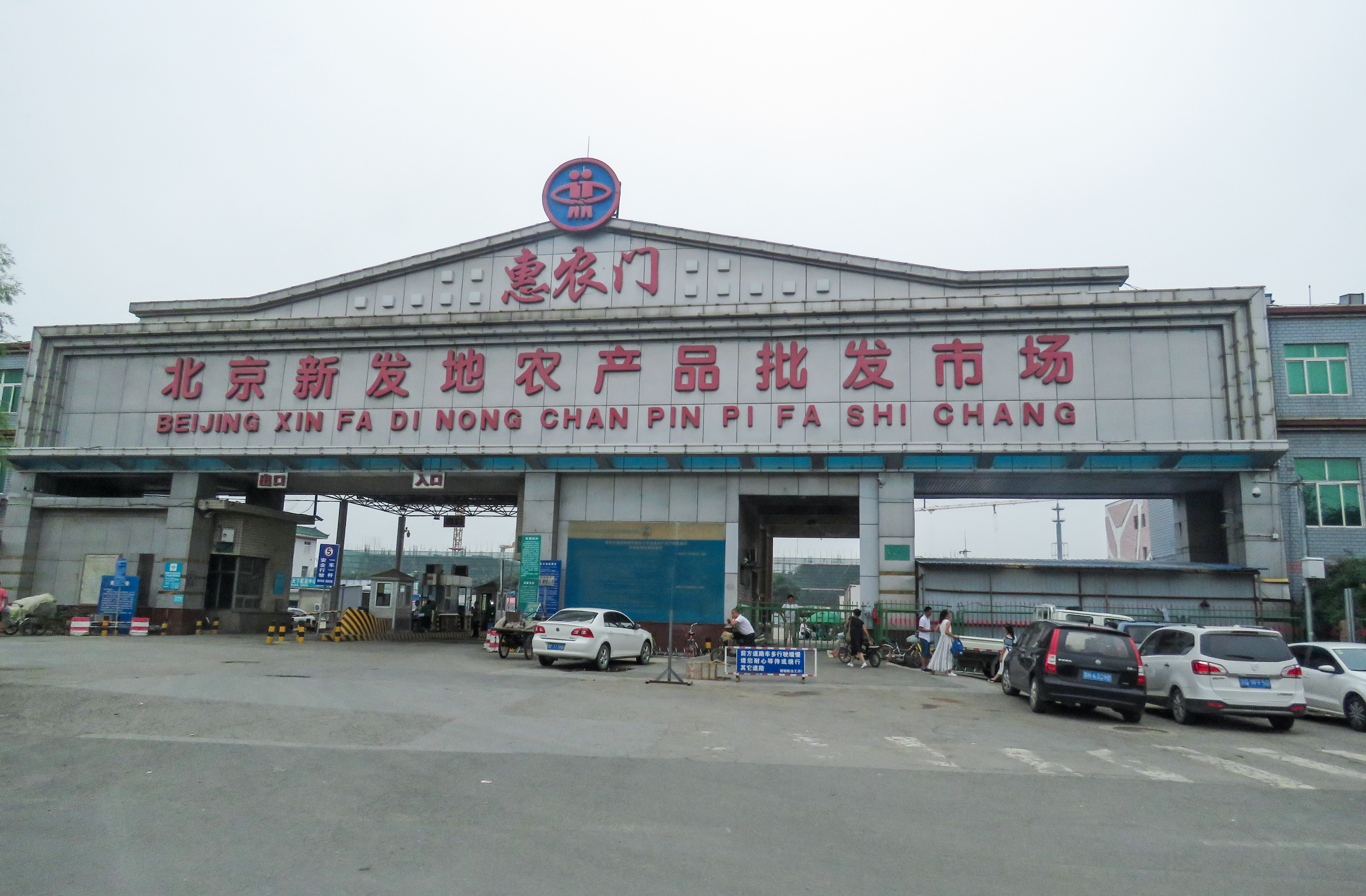
- Xinfadi Wholesale Market within the subdistrict, 2018

- Location within Beijing Location within China
- Coordinates: 39°49′29″N 116°18′36″E
- Country: China
- Municipality: Beijing
- District: Fengtai
- Village-level Divisions: 12 communities 5 village

Area
  - Total: 36.85 km^{2} (14.23 sq mi)

Population (2020)
  - Total: 119,171
  - Density: 3,234/km^{2} (8,376/sq mi)
- Time zone: UTC+8 (China Standard)
- Postal code: 100070
- Area code: 010

Huaxiang Subdistrict (Chinese: 花乡街道; pinyin: Huāxiāng Jiēdào), or previously Huaxiang Area, is a subdistrict on the eastern side of Fengtai District, Beijing, China. In 2020 it had a population of 119,171

The name of the subdistrict, Huaxiang (Chinese: 花乡; lit. 'Flower Township'), was derived from its historical status as a major producer of flowers, especially jasmine and lilytree, since 1900s,

== History ==
Timeline of Huaxiang Subdistrict
Years	Status
1950	Part of the 12th District of Beijing
1952	Part of Fengtai District
1953	17 townships were established in the area
1956	The 17 townships were combined into the following 4: Kandang, Huangtugang, Fanjiacun and Guogongzhuang
1958	The 4 townships merged to form People's Commune of Shangyou
1959	Renamed to People's Commune of Huangtugang
1960	Renamed to People's Commune of Huangtugang Sino-Hungarian Friendship
1983	Reformed into a rural bureau
1984	Renamed Huaxiang Township
2010	Established as Huaxiang Subdistrict
2021	Reformed into a subdistrict

== Administrative Division ==
As of 2023, Huaxiang Subdistrict is divided into 17 subdivisions, with 12 communities and 5 villages:

Administrative Division Code	Community Names	Name Transliteration	Type
110106018002	天伦锦城	Tianlun Jincheng	Community
110106018006	郭公庄幸福家园	Guogongzhuang Xingfu Jiayuan	Community
110106018009	三乐花园	Sanyue Huayuan	Community
110106018011	银地第二	Yindi Di'er	Community
110106018012	明春苑	Mingchunyuan	Community
110106018013	银地	Yindi	Community
110106018014	康润南里	Kangrunnanli	Community
110106018015	康润东里	Kangrundongli	Community
110106018016	康润西里	Kangrunxili	Community
110106018017	郭公庄南街	Guogongzhuangnanjie	Community
110106018018	郭公庄中街	Guogongzhuangzhongjie	Community
110106018019	郭公庄北街	Guogongzhuangbeijie	Community
110106018202	新发地	Xinfadi	Village
110106018204	郭公庄	Guogongzhuang	Village
110106018205	高立庄	Gaolizhuang	Village
110106018209	羊坊	Yangfang	Village
110106018210	葆台	Baotai	Village

== Landmark ==
- Beijing World Park

== See also ==
- List of township-level divisions of Beijing
