= Lugouqiao (disambiguation) =

Lugouqiao is a bridge in Beijing commonly known as Marco Polo Bridge.

Lugouqiao may also refer to:

- Lugouqiao Incident, at the above bridge, marked the start of the Second Sino-Japanese War
- Lugouqiao Subdistrict, a subdistrict of Fengtai, Beijing, where the bridge is located
- Liuliqiao Subdistrict, a subdistrict of Fengtai, Beijing, previously known as Lugouqiao Subdistrict until 2021
