= Wanping Subdistrict =

Wanping Subdistrict 宛平街道
- Subdistrict
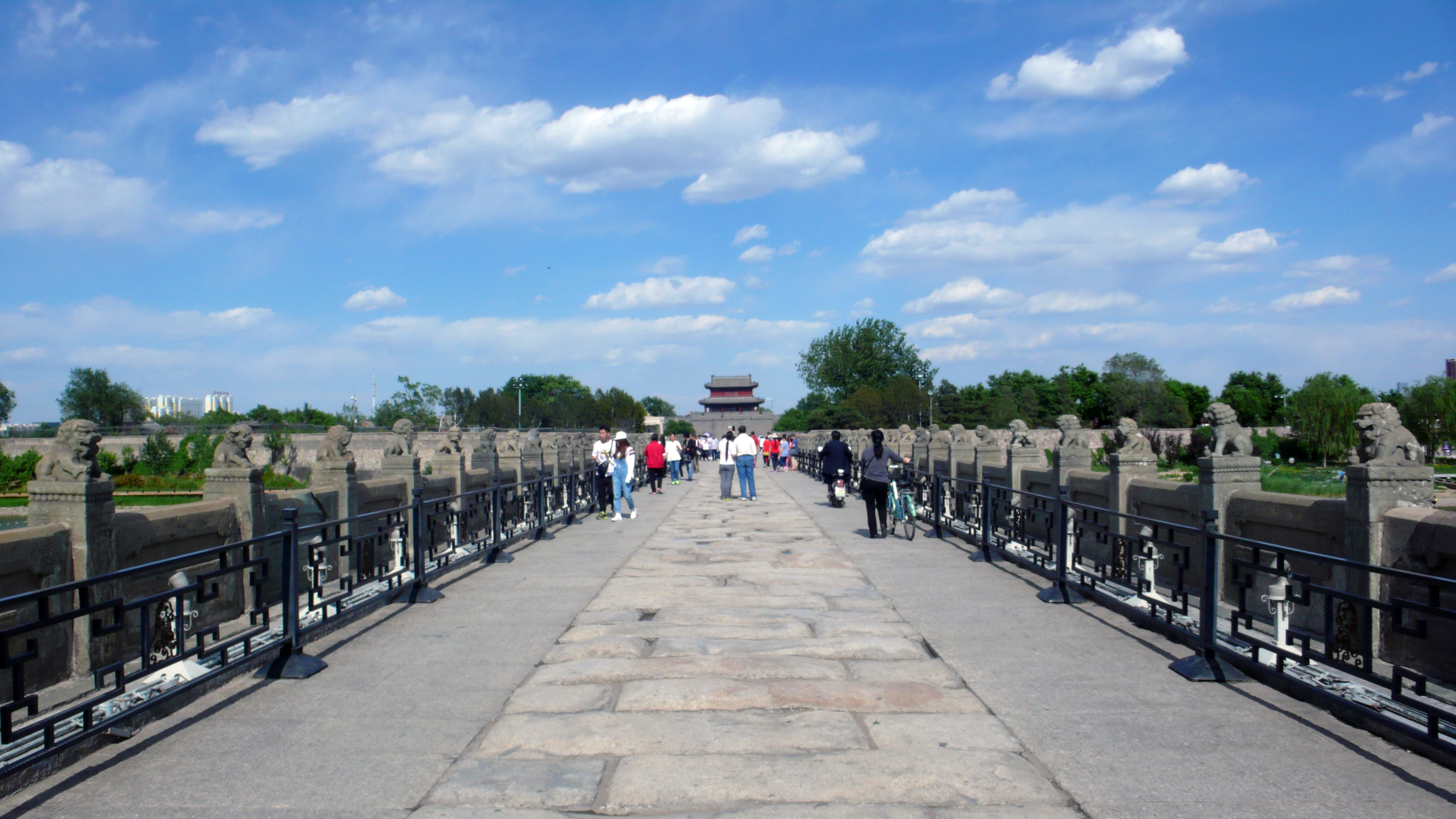
- Wanpingcheng Gate as seen from Marco Polo Bridge, 2016

- Location within Beijing Location within China
- Coordinates: 39°51′04″N 116°12′32″E
- Country: China
- Municipality: Beijing
- District: Fengtai
- Village-level Divisions: 11 communities 3 village

Area
  - Total: 19.3 km^{2} (7.5 sq mi)

Population (2020)
  - Total: 46,208
  - Density: 2,390/km^{2} (6,200/sq mi)
- Time zone: UTC+8 (China Standard)
- Postal code: 100165
- Area code: 010

Wanping Subdistrict (Chinese: 宛平街道; pinyin: Wǎnpíng Jiēdào), formerly known as Wanpingcheng Area, is a subdistrict in the northern part of Fengtai District, Beijing, China. It borders Lugu Subdistrict to the north, Lugouqiao Subdistrict and Huaxiang Township to the east, Huangcun Township to the south, Changyang Town and Changxindian Town to the west. The subdistrict had a population of 46,208 as of the 2020 census.

The name of the subdistrict came from Wanping, an old city that was first created around here in 1637.

== History ==
Timeline of Wanping Subdistrict
Time	Status
Ming dynasty	Created as Gongji City
Qing dynasty	Renamed to Gongbei City
1928	Transferred Beijing to Hebei, renamed to Wanping after the county that hosted its government
1937	On the night of July 7, Imperial Japanese Army demanded to enter this region on pretense of searching for a missing Japanese soldier, and the refusal of which led to the outbreak of Second Sino-Japanese War.
1949	Transferred back to Beijing as part of other subdivisions
1992	Created as Wanpingcheng Subdistrict (Area)
2002	Incorporated Laozhuangzi Township
2021	Area status was revoked and renamed to Wanping Subdistrict, incorporated Lugouqiao Village

== Administrative Division ==
As of 2023, 14 subdivision constituted the Wanping Subdistrict, including 11 communities and 3 villages:

Administrative Division Code	Community Names	Name Transliteration	Type
110106014001	城北	Chengbei	Community
110106014002	宛平城	Wanpingcheng	Community
110106014003	城南	Chengnan	Community
110106014004	晓月苑	Xiaoyueyuan	Community
110106014005	老庄子	Laozhuangzi	Community
110106014006	晓月苑第二	Xiaoyueyuan Di'er	Community
110106014007	沸城	Feicheng	Community
110106014008	城南第二	Chengnan Di'er	Community
110106014009	景园	Jingyuan	Community
110106014010	宛平城东关	Wanpingcheng Dongguan	Community
110106014011	新城	Xincheng	Community
110106014201	永合庄	Yonghezhuang	Village
110106014202	北天堂	Beitiantang	Village
110106014203	卢沟桥	Lugouqiao	Village

== Landmark ==
- Wanping Fortress
- Museum of the War of Chinese People's Resistance Against Japanese Aggression

== See also ==
- List of township-level divisions of Beijing
