= Marco Polo Bridge incident =

1937 battle of the Second Sino-Japanese War

- Part of the Second Sino-Japanese War
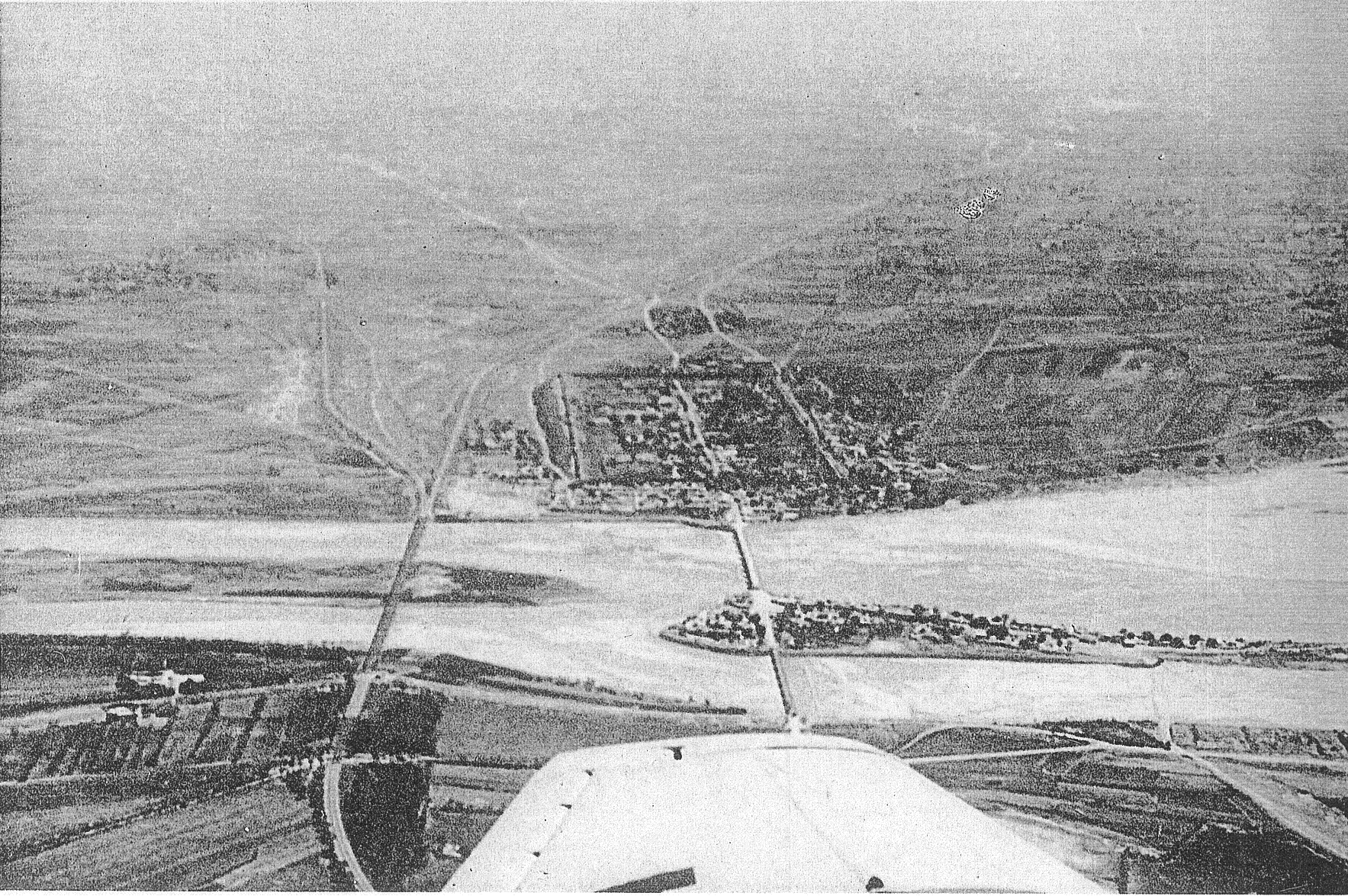
- Aerial photo of the Marco Polo Bridge (right) in 1937. Wanping Fortress is on the opposite side of the river.
Date	July 7–9, 1937 (2 days)
Location	Near Beijing, China 39°50′57″N 116°12′47″E
Result	See § Aftermath

Belligerents
China	Japan

Commanders and leaders
Qin Dechun; Ji Xingwen; Feng Zhi'an; He Jifeng; Jin Zhenzhong	Masakazu Kawabe; Renya Mutaguchi; Kiyonao Ichiki

Units involved
29th Army	Japanese China Garrison Army

Strength
100 troops at the bridge 900 in reinforcement	5,600

Casualties and losses
Western claim: 96 killed Chinese claim: 180+ killed or wounded (Note: from 7 until 8 July 1937)	Western claim: 660 killed Japanese claim: 10 killed, 15 badly wounded, 19 lightly wounded

Chinese name
- Traditional Chinese: 盧溝橋事變
- Simplified Chinese: 卢沟桥事变
- Literal meaning: Lugou Bridge incident
- Hanyu Pinyin: Lúgōuqiáo Shìbiàn

Alternative Chinese name
- Traditional Chinese: 七七事變
- Simplified Chinese: 七七事变
- Literal meaning: July 7 incident
- Hanyu Pinyin: Qīqī Shìbiàn

Japanese name
- Kanji: 盧溝橋事件
- Revised Hepburn: Rokōkyō Jiken
- Location within Beijing Marco Polo Bridge incident (China)

The Marco Polo Bridge incident, also known as the Lugou Bridge incident (Note: Traditional Chinese: 盧溝橋事變; simplified Chinese: 卢沟桥事变; pinyin: Lúgōuqiáo shìbiàn) or the July 7 incident, (Note: Simplified Chinese: 七七事变; traditional Chinese: 七七事變; pinyin: Qīqī shìbiàn) was a three-day battle that began on 7 July 1937 in the district of Beijing between the 29th Army of the National Revolutionary Army of the Republic of China and the Imperial Japanese Army.

Since the Japanese invasion of Manchuria in 1931, there had been many small incidents along the rail line connecting Beijing with the port of Tianjin, but all had subsided. On the night of 7 July, Japanese garrison troops at Lugouqiao held an unusual manoeuvre; and, alleging that a Japanese soldier was missing, demanded entry into the City of Wanping to conduct a search. Fighting broke out while the Japanese complaint was still under negotiation. However, the missing Japanese soldier had already returned to his lines. The Marco Polo Bridge incident is generally regarded as the start of the Second Sino-Japanese War.

== Introduction ==
In English, the battle is usually known as the "Marco Polo Bridge incident". The Marco Polo Bridge is an eleven-arch granite bridge, an architecturally significant structure first erected under the Jin dynasty and later restored during the reign of the Kangxi Emperor of the Qing dynasty in 1698. It gained its Western name from its appearance in Il Milione, Marco Polo's record of his travels.

It is also known as the "Lukouchiao", "Lugouqiao", or 'Lugou Bridge incident' from the local name of the bridge, derived from a former name of the Yongding River. This is the common name for the event in Japanese (蘆溝橋事件, Rokōkyō Jiken) and is an alternate name for it in Chinese and Korean (Korean: 노구교 사건; RR: Nogugyo Sageon). The same name is also expressed or translated as the "Battle of Lugou Bridge", "Lugouqiao", or "Lukouchiao".

== Background ==
Tensions between the Empire of Japan and the Republic of China had been heightened since the Japanese invasion of Manchuria in 1931 and their 1932 creation of a puppet state, Manchukuo, with Puyi, the deposed Qing dynasty emperor, as its head of state. After the invasion, Japanese forces extended their control further into northern China, seeking to obtain raw materials and industrial capacity. A commission of inquiry from the League of Nations published the Lytton Report which was critical of the Japanese, resulting in Japan quitting the League.

The Kuomintang (KMT) government of China refused to recognize Manchukuo but did agree to the Tanggu Truce with Japan in 1933. Subsequently, there were various "incidents", or armed clashes of a limited nature, followed by a return to uneasy peace. The significance of the Marco Polo Bridge incident is that, following it, tensions did not subside again; instead, there was an escalation, with larger forces committed by both sides and fighting spreading to other parts of China. With hindsight, this small incident can, therefore, be regarded as the start of a major conflict.

By the terms of the Boxer Protocol of 7 September 1901, China had granted nations with legations in Beijing the right to station guards at twelve specific points along railways connecting Beijing with Tianjin. This was to ensure open communications between the capital and the port. By a supplementary agreement on 15 July 1902, these forces were allowed to conduct maneuvers without informing the authorities of other nations in China.

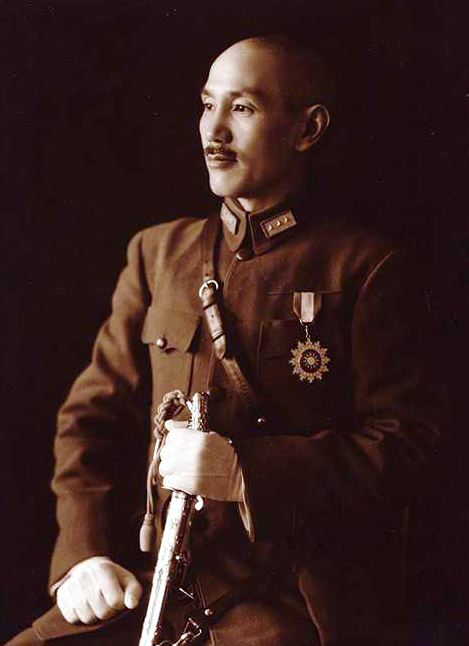
Generalissimo Chiang Kai-shek, Allied Commander-in-Chief in the China theater between 1942 and 1945

By July 1937, Japan had expanded its forces in China to an estimated 7,000 to 15,000 men, mostly along the railways. This number of men, and the amount of concomitant matériel, was several times the size of the detachments deployed by the European powers, and greatly in excess of the limits set by the Boxer Protocol. By this time, the Imperial Japanese Army had already surrounded Beijing and Tianjin.

== Incident ==
On the night of 7 July, the Japanese units stationed at Fengtai crossed the border to conduct military exercises. Japanese and Chinese forces outside the town of Wanping—a walled town 16.4 km (10.2 mi) southwest of Beijing—exchanged fire at approximately 23:00. The exact cause of this incident remains unknown. When a Japanese soldier, Private Shimura Kikujiro, failed to return to his post, Chinese regimental commander Ji Xingwen (219th Regiment, 37th Division, 29th Army) received a message from the Japanese demanding permission to enter Wanping to search for the missing soldier; the Chinese refused.

Private Shimura had merely lost his way and was found shortly thereafter. (He claimed to have sought immediate relief in the darkness from a stomach ache and become lost; according to Peter Harmsen, he had visited a brothel.) The Chinese authorities were notified of his return at around 2:00 a.m. the following morning. However, despite the soldier being found, the Japanese military decided to escalate their demands. Because shots had been fired at their troops during the initial entry into Wanping, they shifted the purpose of their mission from a search for Shimura into a hunt for the Chinese soldiers who had fired the initial shots. While Japanese diplomats and the Special Service Agency in Peiping attempted to negotiate a peaceful local settlement, the Japanese garrison headquarters in Tianjin sent firm instructions to the front lines ordering troops to demand a formal apology for the shooting and to prepare to use force. By that time both sides were mobilizing, with the Japanese deploying reinforcements to surround Wanping. The Chinese defenders were equally resolute. He Jifeng, commander of the 110th Brigade (who historians later discovered had secret contact with the Chinese Communist Party), ordered the 219th Regiment to closely monitor the Japanese and to counterattack if provoked.

Later that night, a unit of Japanese infantry attempted to breach Wanping's walled defenses but were repulsed. An ultimatum by the Japanese was issued two hours later. As a precautionary measure, Qin Dechun, the acting commander of the Chinese 29th Army, contacted the commander of the Chinese 37th Division, General Feng Zhi'an, ordering him to place his troops on heightened alert.

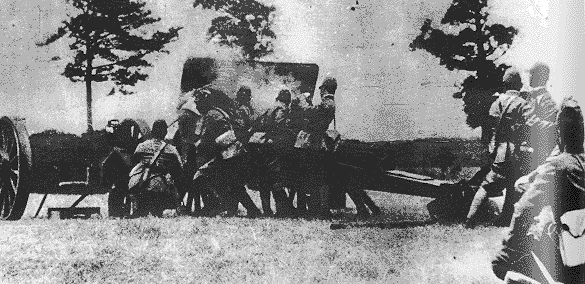
Japanese forces bombarding Wanping Fortress, 1937

At 02:00 on 8 July, Qin Dechun, executive officer and acting commander of the Chinese 29th Army, sent Wang Lengzhai, mayor of Wanping, alone to the Japanese camp to conduct negotiations. However, this proved to be fruitless, and the Japanese insisted that they be admitted into the town to investigate the cause of the incident.

At around 04:00, reinforcements of both sides began to arrive. The Chinese also rushed an extra division of troops to the area. At 04:45 Wang Lengzhai had returned to Wanping, and on his way back he witnessed Japanese troops massing around the town. Within five minutes of Wang's return, a shot was heard, and both sides began firing.

Colonel Ji Xingwen led the Chinese defenses with about 100 men, with orders to hold the bridge at all costs. The Chinese were able to hold the bridge with the help of reinforcements, but suffered tremendous losses. At this point, the Japanese military and members of the Japanese Foreign Service began negotiations in Beijing with the Chinese Nationalist government.

A ceasefire agreement was reached on 11 July in Beiping, negotiated primarily by Chinese General Song Zheyuan, commander of the 29th Army and chairman of the Hebei-Chahar Political Council, alongside representatives Zhang Zizhong and Zhang Yunrong. The formalized three-point agreement stipulated that:

- The Chinese would express regret and punish those responsible.
- The Chinese would turn over the defense of Wanping Fortress to the civilian Peace Preservation Corps.
- China would take preventative countermeasures and crack down thoroughly against anti-Japanese organizations, specifically citing the Communist Party and the Blue Shirts Society.

Despite this signed agreement, Japanese Garrison Infantry Brigade commander General Masakazu Kawabe initially rejected the truce and, against his superiors' orders, continued to shell Wanping for the next three hours, until prevailed upon to cease and to move his forces to the northeast.

== Aftermath ==
Although a local ceasefire had been declared, efforts to de-escalate the conflict ultimately failed. The Japanese army leadership, backed by Prime Minister Fumimaro Konoe's populist "initiative theory," continued to push for mobilization and stirred up public war fever, deliberately overturning earlier non-escalation policies and renaming the skirmish the "North China Incident". Fighting quickly resumed, driven by a deep mutual distrust and a lack of control over frontline forces. The closer the Chinese troops of the 29th Army were to the front lines, the stronger their anti-Japanese sentiment became. Because of this localized fury, even though Song Zheyuan and other senior Chinese officers ordered a compromise with Japan, they could not fully control their own battalions.

=== Escalation by the Central Governments ===
While local forces skirmished, the central governments in Tokyo and Nanjing both made decisions that inadvertently sabotaged the chances of a lasting peace. In Tokyo, the Imperial Japanese Army General Staff was initially divided. The non-expansionist faction, led by Major General Kanji Ishiwara, strongly argued against escalating the conflict in China, insisting that Japan's primary strategic focus needed to remain on preparing for a potential war with the Soviet Union. Ishiwara successfully pushed for Imperial Order No. 400 on 8 July, which explicitly instructed Japanese forces in China to avoid further use of military force. However, as local negotiations stalled and reports emerged of Chinese troop movements, hardliners within the Japanese military gained traction. Fearing a Chinese offensive, Tokyo authorized the mobilization of several divisions from mainland Japan. On 11 July, in accordance with the Goso conference, the Imperial Japanese Army General Staff authorized the deployment of an infantry division from the Chosen Army, two combined brigades from the Kwantung Army and an air regiment composed of 18 squadrons as reinforcements to Northern China. By 20 July, total Japanese military strength in the Beiping-Tianjin area exceeded 180,000 personnel. This decision severely undermined the local Japanese commanders attempting to negotiate a localized settlement and sent a threatening signal to the Chinese.

Simultaneously in Nanjing, Generalissimo Chiang Kai-shek determined that Japan's expanding presence in North China could no longer be tolerated. Rather than allowing the regional 29th Army to handle the crisis independently, Chiang ordered Central Army divisions to march north towards Baoding and Shijiazhuang to reinforce the front lines. Under the He–Umezu Agreement of June 1935, Nanjing's Central Army forces had been prohibited from entering Hebei Province. Chiang's deployment of these divisions directly into Hebei violated the treaty and was an unprecedented intervention, as the central government had never directly deployed troops to Hebei while bound by the agreement. This massive deployment confirmed the Japanese hardliners' worst fears, and in response, the Japanese military command in Tianjin decided to temporarily break off the ceasefire negotiations and press for a full-scale offensive against the Chinese forces to implement the He-Umezu Agreement. Chiang firmly solidified this stance on 17 July during a gathering of prominent figures from Chinese society at Lushan. In the Lushan Statement, Chiang publicly called for a war of total resistance against Japan, declaring that the Marco Polo Bridge Incident had called into question the existence of the nation as a whole and that China had finally reached its absolute limit of endurance regarding Japanese encroachment.

Meanwhile, the Chinese Communist Party capitalized on the escalating crisis to advance the formation of the Second United Front. The CCP's declaration for KMT-CCP cooperation, which called for a united resistance to aggression, was sent to the Nationalist government on 15 July 1937. However, the document had already been drafted by Zhou Enlai on 4 July—three days before the outbreak of hostilities at the Marco Polo Bridge. This timeline indicates that the incident was not the direct cause for the CCP's political proposals for cooperation.

=== Local Chinese Leadership's Response ===
The commander of the 29th Army, General Song Zheyuan, found himself trapped between the increasingly aggressive Japanese military and Chiang Kai-shek's central government in Nanjing. Initially, Song suspected the incident was a plot to undermine his regional authority. He confessed to an associate that he felt out of step with the central government in Nanjing, and he could not cooperate with Chiang Kai-shek. Frustrated that the 29th Army was being left to face the Japanese alone while Central Army reinforcements were slow to arrive, Song attempted to appease the Japanese to preserve his own forces. On 18 July, Song personally visited Japanese Lieutenant General Kiyoshi Katsuki in Tianjin to offer an official apology, expressing his sincere regret for the incident and declaring that he was eager to achieve goodwill between Japan and China.

However, as massive Japanese reinforcements from the Kwantung Army and mainland Japan began arriving in North China, Song realized his strategy of local appeasement was failing. He decided to use the ongoing negotiations merely to buy time, preserving his army's strength as much as possible while he prepared for a war of resistance, realizing he would inevitably have to rely on the central government for support. Despite Chiang Kai-shek's orders for Song to retreat to Baoding to command the defense, Song stubbornly remained in Peiping even as it was surrounded. Chiang privately criticized Song's initial appeasement, noting in his diary that Song's delusion of gaining temporary peace by playing nice with the enemy had caused him to ignore the danger of the Japanese encirclement until it was too late.

=== Collapse of Ceasefire ===
The fragile local ceasefire collapsed due to two frontline skirmishes. On the night of 25 July, Japanese troops sent to repair military communication cables at the Langfang train station were suddenly surrounded and ambushed by the Chinese 226th Company. The Japanese troops had stacked their rifles to eat a meal when the Chinese barracks opened fire on them with light machine guns and hand grenades. Upon receiving news of this unprovoked attack on a repair crew, Japanese military headquarters in Tianjin determined the Chinese were acting in bad faith and decided that all further attempts to resolve the problem through diplomatic negotiations would be abandoned in favor of a counterattack. The following day, on 26 July, a Japanese convoy attempting to enter Beijing through the Guanganmen gate was also ambushed. Chinese authorities had agreed to let them pass, but as the third Japanese truck approached, the Chinese began closing the gate and suddenly opened fire with machine guns and mortar rounds.

=== Battle of Beiping–Tianjin ===
Following the breakdown of negotiations and the clashes at Langfang and Guanganmen, the Japanese issued an ultimatum for the withdrawal of the Chinese 37th Division. After launching an attack on the Japanese lines on 27 July, General Song Zheyuan was defeated and forced to retreat behind the Yongding River by the next day. The Japanese Army launched a full-scale offensive on Beiping and Tianjin on 28 July. With this, the initial policy by which Japan had aimed to avoid escalation by the local settlement of disputes ended with the first battle of the Second Sino-Japanese War." After 24 days of combat, the Chinese 29th Army was forced to withdraw. The Japanese captured Beiping and the Taku Forts at Tianjin on 29 and 30 July respectively, thus concluding the Battle of Beiping–Tianjin. However, the offensive triggered severe unintended consequences. On 29 July, the day after the Japanese assault began, Chinese troops belonging to the Peace Preservation Corps stationed in Tongzhou—the capital of the Japanese-aligned East Hebei Autonomous Government—mutinied against their Japanese overseers. In what became known as the Tongzhou mutiny, the Chinese forces killed approximately two hundred Japanese and Korean civilians and residents. The massacre received massive coverage in the Japanese press, enflaming public opinion and rendering any further attempts to de-escalate the conflict politically impossible. Although the Japanese Army had initially been given orders not to advance further than the Yongding River, and the Konoe government's foreign minister attempted a sudden volte-face by stating "Japan wants Chinese cooperation, not Chinese land," local negotiations had completely collapsed. The Marco Polo Bridge clash served as the final impetus to solidify the Sino-Soviet Non-Aggression Pact, which was signed shortly after, as Chiang Kai-shek recognized local appeasement was no longer viable. On 9 August 1937, a Japanese naval officer was shot in Shanghai, escalating the skirmishes and battles into full-scale warfare. However, even as the fighting spread, international diplomatic maneuverings continued for several months. Efforts to negotiate an end to the conflict persisted past the outbreak of the Battle of Shanghai, most notably through the Trautmann mediation (brokered by Germany) and the Nine Power Treaty Conference in Brussels. These final diplomatic efforts ultimately failed. Total war was effectively cemented after the fall of the capital at the Battle of Nanking and the subsequent Nanjing Massacre, when Prime Minister Konoe formally declared in early 1938 that Japan would no longer negotiate with Chiang Kai-shek.

The 29th Army's resistance (and poor equipment) inspired the 1937 "Sword March", which with reworked lyrics became the NRA's standard marching cadence and popularized the racial epithet guizi to describe the Japanese invaders.

== Consequences ==
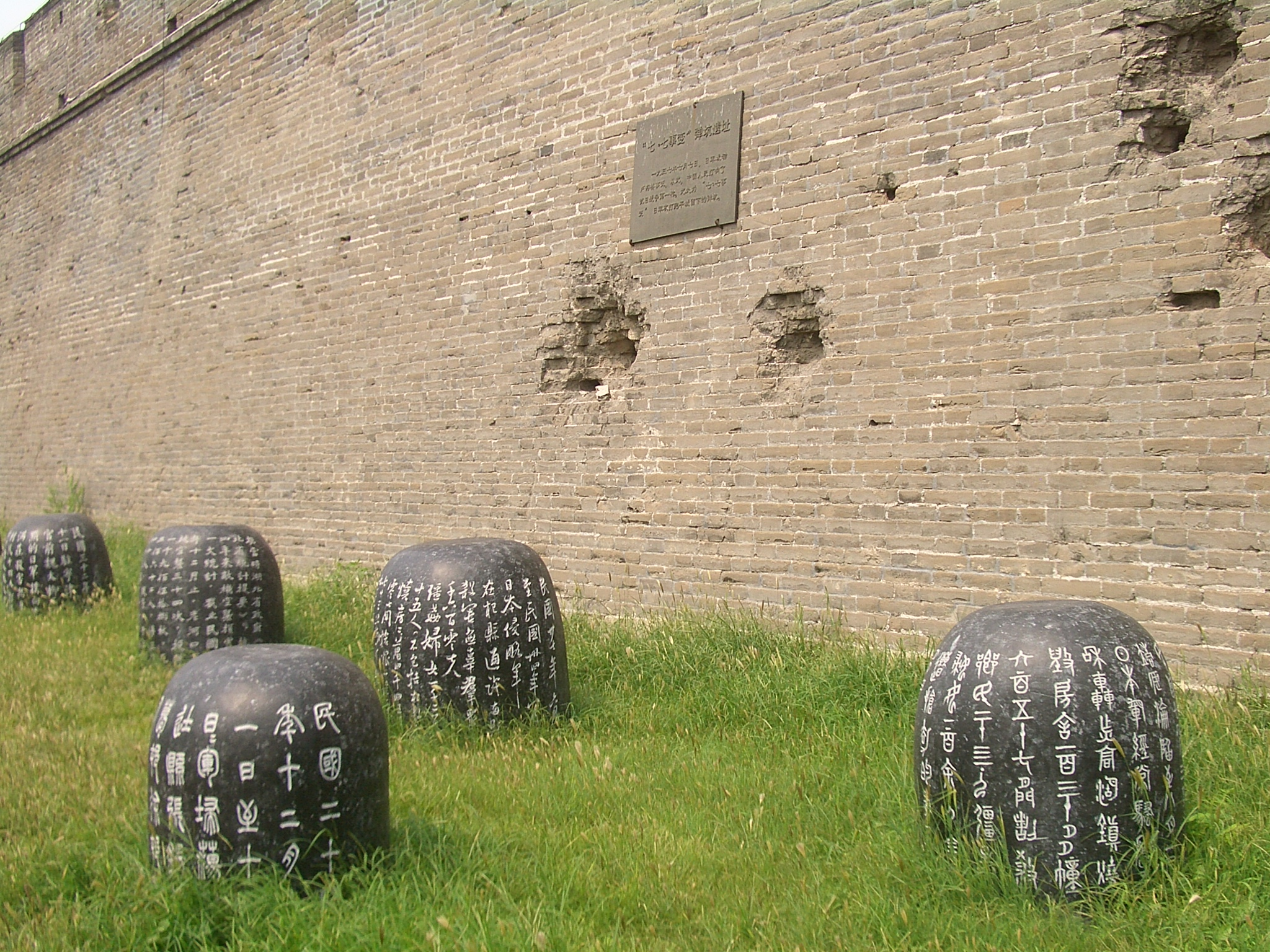
Damage from the Japanese shells on the wall of Wanping Fortress, now marked with a memorial plaque

The heightened tensions of the Marco Polo Bridge incident led directly to full-scale war between the Empire of Japan and the Republic of China, with the Battle of Beiping–Tianjin at the end of July and the Battle of Shanghai in August.

The Marco Polo Bridge incident resulted in an increase of patriotic sentiment in China, with discourse focused on themes of national salvation and resistance against Japanese aggression. It also resulted in temporary unity between politically diverse and disagreeing groups within China. The bridge became a symbol of Chinese unity and resistance.

In 1937, during the Battle of Beiping–Tianjin the government was notified by Muslim General Ma Bufang of the Ma clique that he was prepared to bring the fight to the Japanese in a telegram message. Immediately after the Marco Polo Bridge incident, Ma Bufang arranged for a cavalry division under the Muslim General Ma Biao to be sent east to battle the Japanese. The Turkic Salar people made up the majority of the first cavalry division sent by Ma.

The Marco Polo Bridge incident inspired resistance-themed cultural works, such as spoken dramas. Among the most popular of these was the three-act play Defend the Marco Polo Bridge.

In 1987, the bridge was renovated and the People's Anti-Japanese War Museum was built near the bridge to commemorate the anniversary of the start of the Second Sino-Japanese War.

== Controversies ==
There is debate over whether the incident could have been planned like the earlier Mukden incident, which served as a pretext for the Japanese invasion of Manchuria. According to Jim Huffman this notion has been "widely rejected" by historians, as the Japanese would likely have been more concerned over the threat posed by the Soviets. Controversial conservative Japanese historian Ikuhiko Hata has suggested that the incident could have been caused by the Chinese Communist Party, hoping it would lead to a war of attrition between the Japanese army and the Kuomintang. However, he himself still considers this less likely than the "accidental shot" hypothesis, that the first shot was fired by a low-ranking Chinese soldier in "an unplanned moment of fear".

Modern scholarship, such as that by Nobu Iwatani, supports the conclusion that the July 7 shooting was a trifling incident that spiraled out of control due to profound mutual distrust rather than a premeditated conspiracy by either the Japanese military or the Chinese Communists. Iwatani notes that while the Japanese forces issued increasingly strict demands to save face, the deeply entrenched anti-Japanese sentiment among Chinese frontline troops made it impossible for local Chinese commanders to fulfill any negotiated compromises. Ultimately, both the Japanese and Chinese central governments misjudged each other's military potential and intentions, leading to a disastrous eight-year war that neither side originally intended to launch from this specific skirmish.

== Order of battle ==
=== National Revolutionary Army ===
In comparison to their Japanese counterparts, the 29th Army, and generally all of the NRA for that matter, was poorly equipped and under-trained. Most soldiers were armed only with a rifle and a dao (a single-edged Chinese sword similar to a machete). Moreover, the Chinese garrison in the Lugouqiao area was completely outnumbered and outgunned; it consisted only of about 100 soldiers.

Name	Military posts	Civilian posts
General Song Zheyuan	Commander of 29th Army	Chairman of Hebei Legislative Committee; Head of Beijing security forces
General Qin Dechun	Vice-Commander of 29th Army	Mayor of Beijing
General Tong Linge	Vice-Commander of 29th Army	
General Liu Ruming	Commander of the 143rd Division	Chairman of Chahar
General Feng Zhi'an (馮治安)	Commander of the 37th Division	Chairman of Hebei
General Zhao Dengyu (趙登禹; Wade-Giles: Chao Teng-yu)	Commander of the 132nd Division	
General Zhang Zizhong (張自忠; Wade-Giles: Chang Tze-chung)	Commander of the 38th Division	Mayor of Tianjin
Colonel Ji Xingwen (吉星文)	Commander of the 219th Regiment under the 110th Brigade of the 37th Division	

=== Imperial Japanese Army ===
The Japanese China Garrison Army was a combined force of infantry, tanks, mechanized forces, artillery and cavalry, which had been stationed in China since the time of the Boxer Rebellion. Its headquarters and bulk for its forces were in Tianjin, with a major detachment in Beijing to protect the Japanese embassy.

Name	Position	Location
Lieutenant General Kanichiro Tashiro	Commander China Garrison Army	Tientsin
Major General Masakazu Kawabe	Commander China Garrison Infantry Brigade	Peking
Colonel Renya Mutaguchi	Commander 1st Infantry Regiment	Peking
Major Kiyonao Ichiki	Commander, 3rd Battalion, 1st Infantry Regiment	W of Marco Polo Bridge, 510 men

== See also ==
- Huanggutun incident (1928)
- Jinan incident (1928)
  - January 28 incident (Shanghai, 1932)
  - Defense of the Great Wall (1933)
