= Wanpingcheng station =

Beijing Subway Line 16 terminus station

Wanpingcheng 宛平城
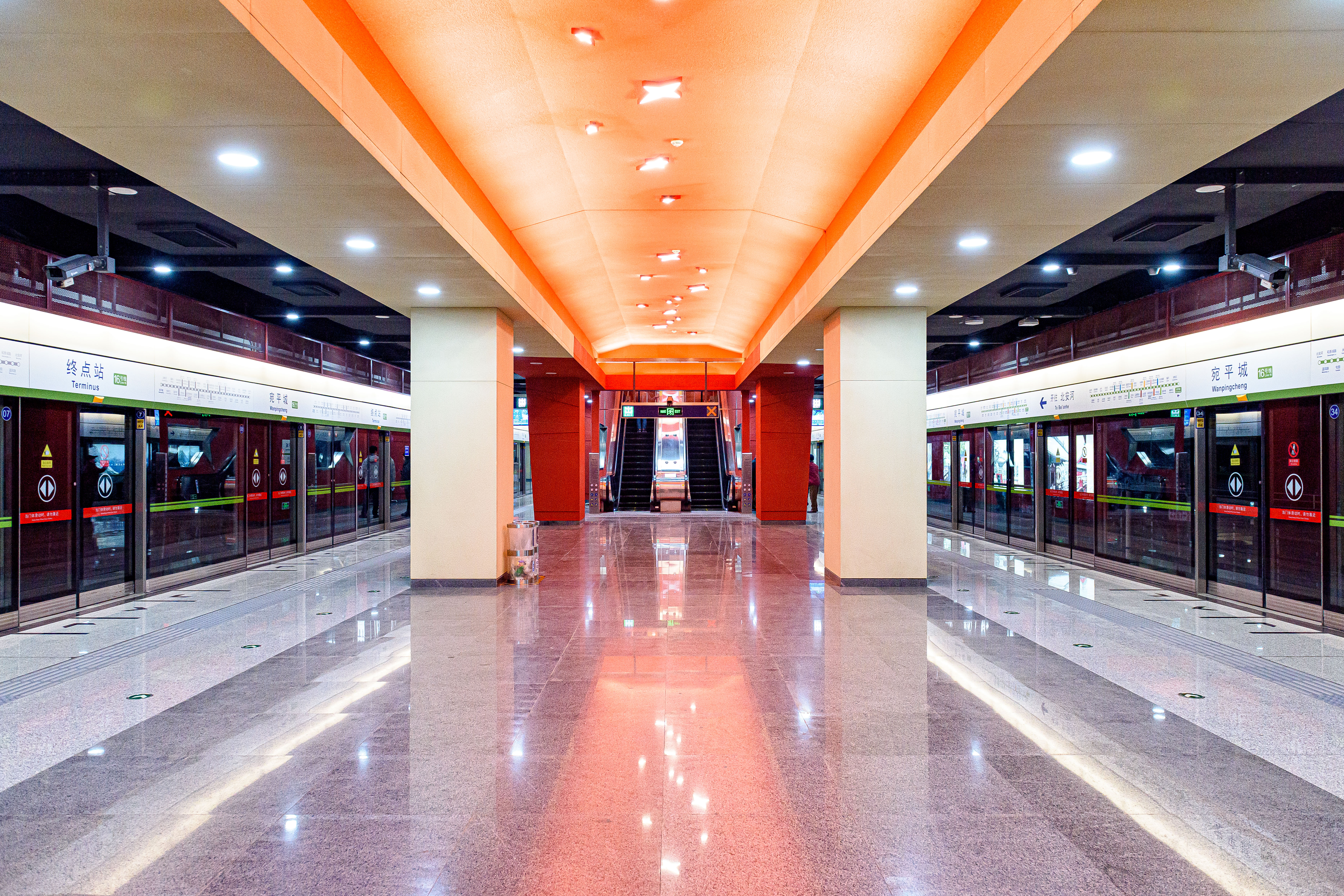
- Platform

General information
- Location: Wanping Subdistrict, Fengtai District, Beijing; China
- Coordinates: 39°50′50″N 116°13′18″E
- Operator: Beijing MTR Metro Line 16 Corp., Ltd.
- Line: Line 16
- Platforms: 2 (1 island platform)
- Tracks: 2

Construction
- Structure type: Underground
- Accessible: Yes

History
- Opened: December 30, 2023; 2 years ago

Services
Preceding station	Beijing Subway	Following station
Hongtaizhuang towards Bei'anhe	Line 16	Terminus
Location

Wanpingcheng station (Chinese: 宛平城站; pinyin: Wǎnpíngchéng zhàn; lit. 'Wanping Fortress station') is a station and the southern terminus on Line 16 of the Beijing Subway. It opened on December 30, 2023.

== History ==
Line 14 was supposed to come to Wanpingcheng area, but in 2008, the line was rerouted, so the residents of Wanpingcheng area signed a petition for Line 14 to come to Wanpingcheng. Due to engineering constraints, Line 14 was not able to have a station in Wanpingcheng. The closest station is Dawayao station.

In 2010, it was planned that the southern terminus for Line 16 would be Lugouqiao Xiaoyueyuan, but the plan was later changed and the line would terminate at Yushuzhuang station. Because of this, residents of Xiaoyueyuan petitioned for the line to terminate at Xiaoyueyuan, but it is unknown whether the plan was reinstated. In May 2011, the plan was changed, and the line was extended to Wanpingcheng.

On April 25, 2013, the design plan for Wanpingcheng station was published, and construction started in December 2013.

== Station layout ==
The station has an underground island platform. There are 3 exits, lettered C1, C2 and D. Currently only exits C1 and D are operational. Exits C1 and D lead to the north side of Lugouqiao South Road, and C2 to the south side of Beijing-Hong Kong-Macau Expressway. Exit C1 is accessible.

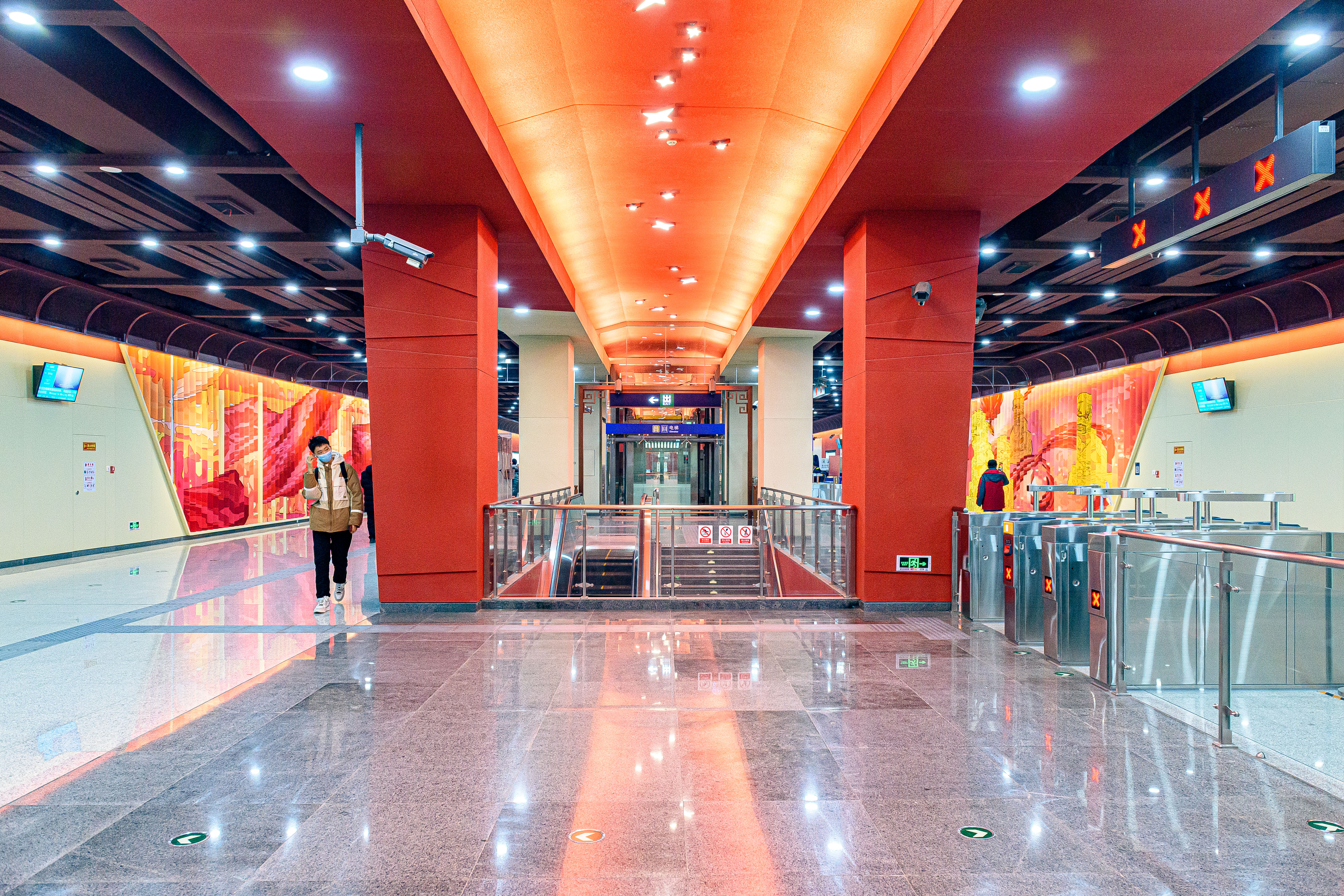
Concourse from east to west

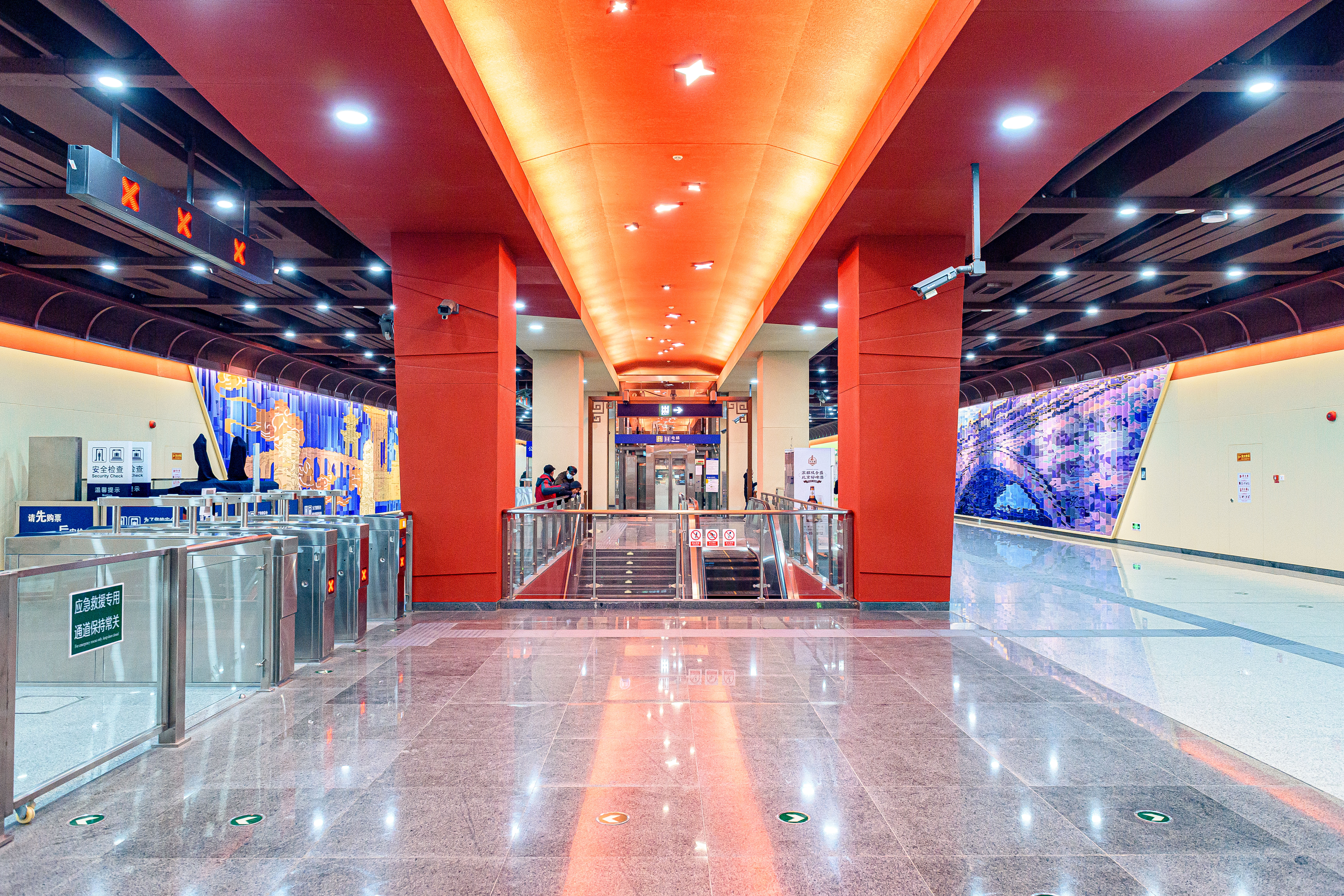
Concourse from west to east

== See also ==
- Wanping Fortress (Wanpingcheng)
