= Qin Dechun =

Chinese military officer and politician (1893–1963)

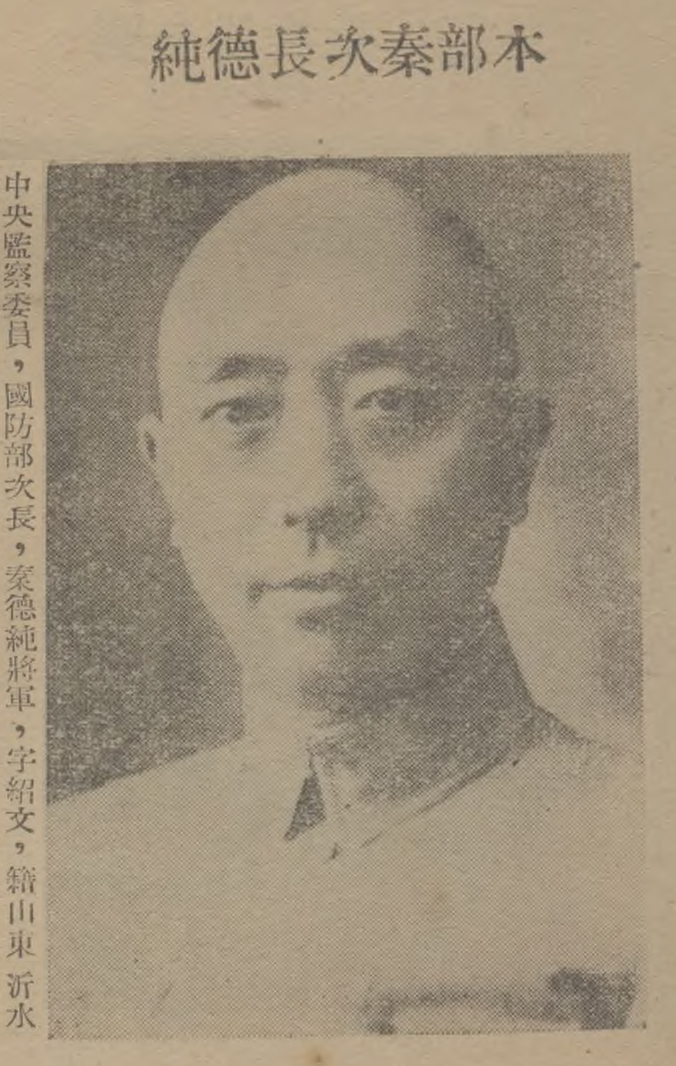

Chairman of Shandong Provincial Government
- In office 30 November 1948 – 14 May 1949
- Preceded by: Wang Yaowu
- Succeeded by: Dissolved

Personal details
- Born: 11 December 1893 Yishui County, Shandong, Qing dynasty
- Died: 7 September 1963 (aged 69) Taipei, Taiwan
- Party: Kuomintang
- Awards: Order of Blue Sky and White Sun

Military service
- Allegiance: Republic of China
- Branch/service: (Republic of China (1912–1949)) National Revolutionary Army
- Battles/wars: Second Sino-Japanese War; Marco Polo Bridge incident; Chinese Civil War

Qin Dechun (Chinese: 秦德純; 11 December 1893 – 7 September 1963) was a military officer and politician of the Republic of China. He was born in Shandong. He graduated from the Baoding Military Academy in Baoding, Hebei. He was a member of the Zhili clique before going over to the Nationalist Government. He fought in the Second Sino-Japanese War, and was the acting commander of the 29th Army during the Marco Polo Bridge Incident. After the defeat of the Kuomintang in the Chinese Civil War he went to Taiwan.

== Biography ==
Qin was born in Yishui County, Shandong in 1893. He graduated from the Baoding Military Academy in 1916. He was assigned to the Shandong 5th Division for field training, later serving in the Shaanxi army. He enrolled in the Beijing Staff College in 1920 and graduated in 1922. He then was sent to Henan, ruled by Feng Yuxiang, and was assigned as the chief of staff of the eastern Henan defense headquarters. He later joined Feng's Guominjun.

When Feng ordered his troops to support the Kuomintang's Northern Expedition against the Beiyang government, Qin participated in the fighting at Henan. After Feng rebelled against Chiang Kai-shek's Nanjing Nationalist government during the Central Plains War, Qin went into temporary retirement, later becoming became a military counselor for Zhang Xueliang. Qin participated in the Defense of the Great Wall against the Japanese in 1933. However, Zhang was forced to surrender control of his army to Chiang Kai-shek in March that year, and He Yingqin was given full authority in north China. Qin then became commander in chief of the Third Army Corps and a member of the Beiping military council. Later in 1933, he was also made deputy commander of the 29th Army under Song Zheyuan and a member of the government of Chahar. In mid-1935, when Song was ordered to Beiping with his 29th Army to stabilize north China in the face of Japanese expansion, Qin succeeded him as governor of Chahar. Later that year Qin was moved to Beiping to become mayor and a member of the Hebei-Chahar political council, which was headed by Song. He was also elected as a member of the Central Supervisory Committee of the Kuomintang at its Fifth Congress in November 1935.

In 1937, Qin took over Song Zheyuan's position as head of the 29th Army, a command he held during the Marco Polo Bridge incident. His troops suffered heavy losses during the fighting in North China early in the Second Sino–Japanese War and he was assigned to various staff positions for the rest of the war.

Qin was named Vice Minister of National Defense in 1946 with the rank of lieutenant general. In 1948 Qin became governor of Shandong province and mayor of Qingdao, but the entirety of Shandong was captured by the People's Liberation Army by the following year. Qin went to Taiwan in 1949 and died of lung cancer in Taipei on 7 September 1963.

Qin was a recipient of the Order of Blue Sky and White Sun.

Preceded by Song Zheyuan	Governor of Chahar Province; June–November 1935	Succeeded by Xiao Zhenying
Preceded by Song Zheyuan	Mayor of Beijing; 1935–1937	Succeeded by Zhang Zizhong
Preceded by Wang Yaowu	Governor of Shandong; 30 November 1948 – 14 May 1949	Succeeded by office abolished

== Bibliography ==
- 沈慶生「Qin Dechun」Chinese Academy of Social Sciences近代史研究所 (1978). 民国人物伝 第1巻|和. Zhonghua Book Company.
- 徐友春主編 (2007). 民国人物大辞典 増訂版&#124. 河北人民出版社. ISBN 978-7-202-03014-1.
- 劉寿林ほか編 (1995). 民国職官年表&#124. Zhonghua Book Company. ISBN 7-101-01320-1.
