= Museum of the War of Chinese People's Resistance Against Japanese Aggression =

Museum and memorial hall in Beijing

- 中国人民抗日战争纪念馆
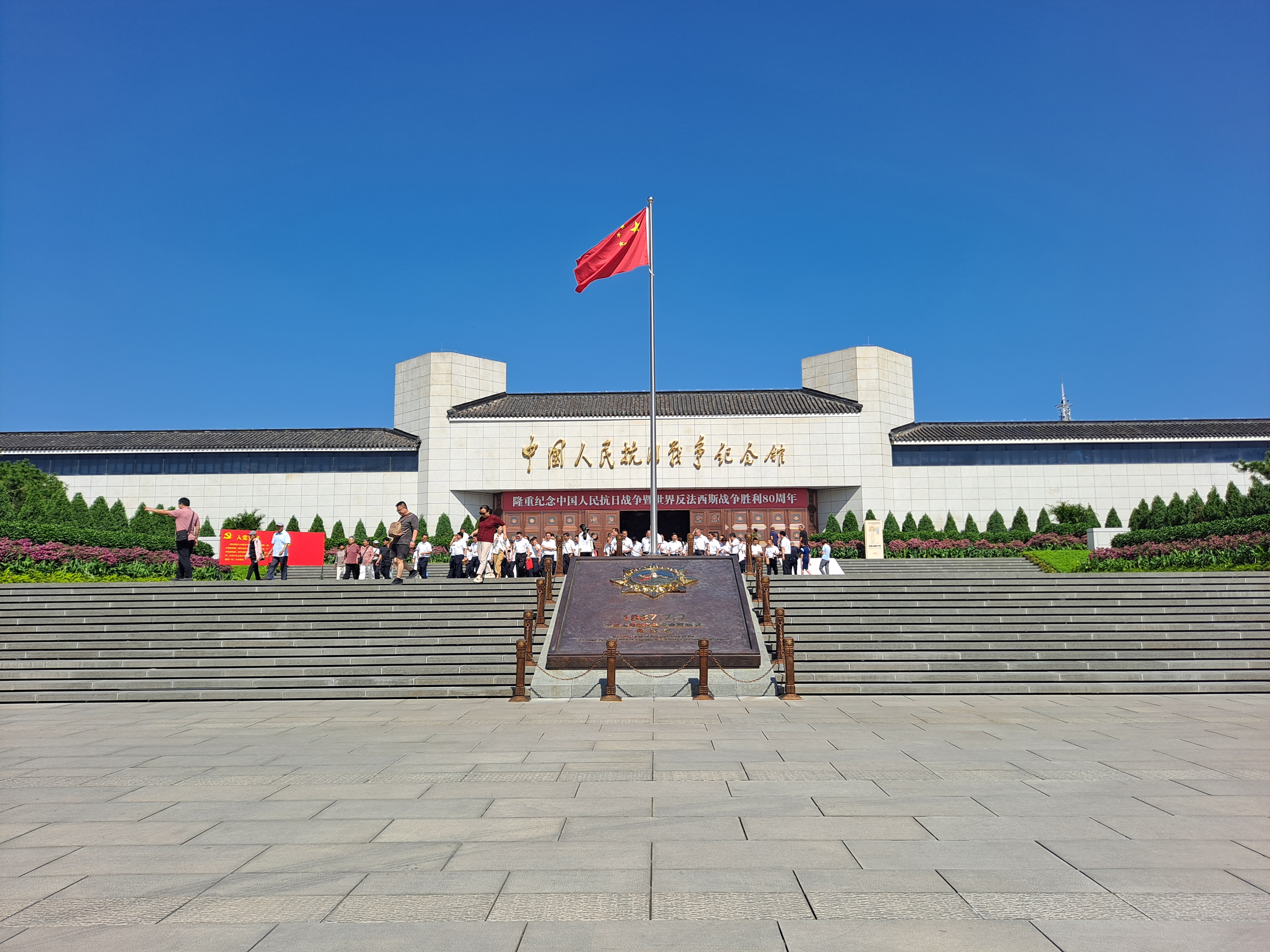
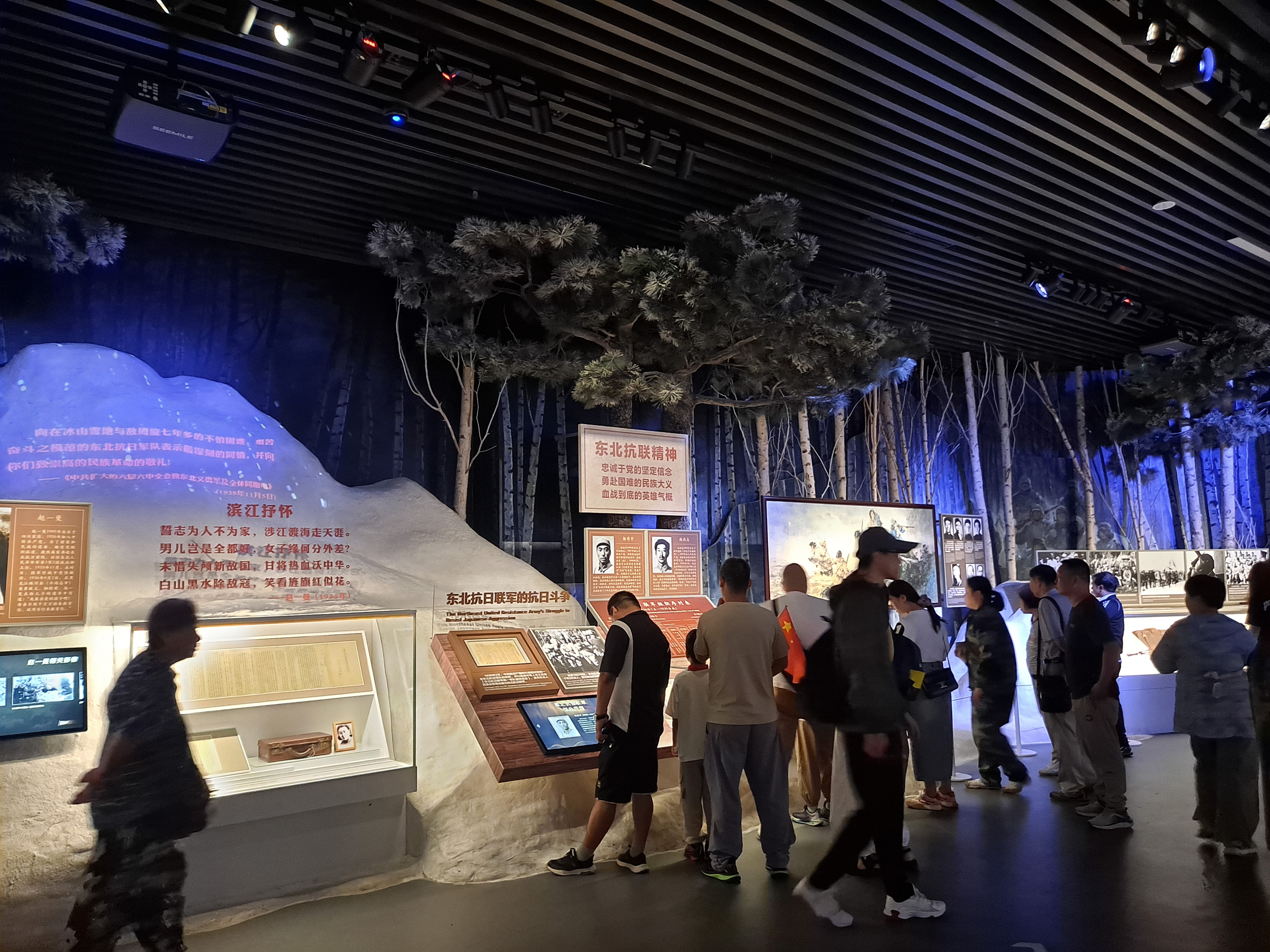
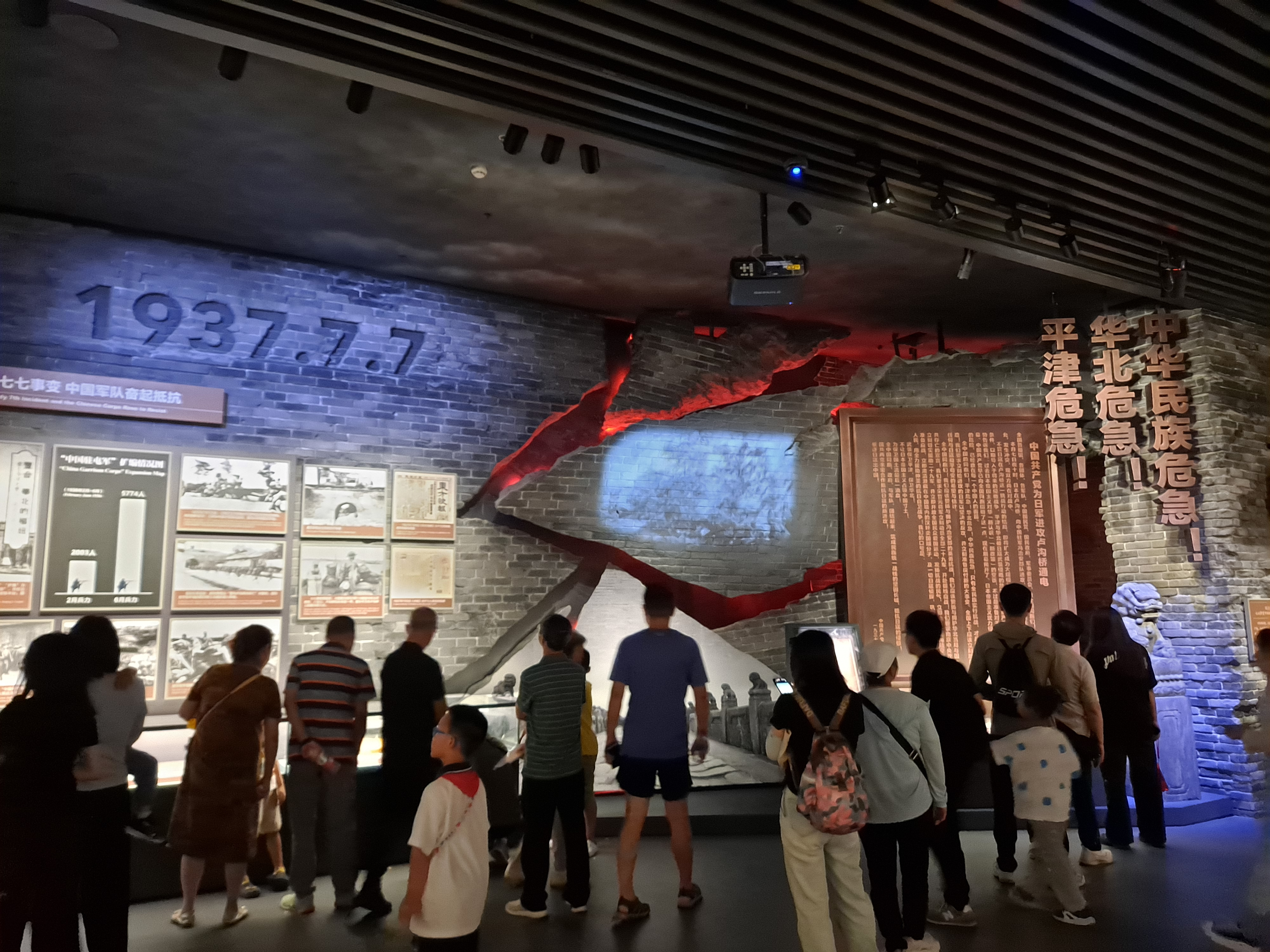
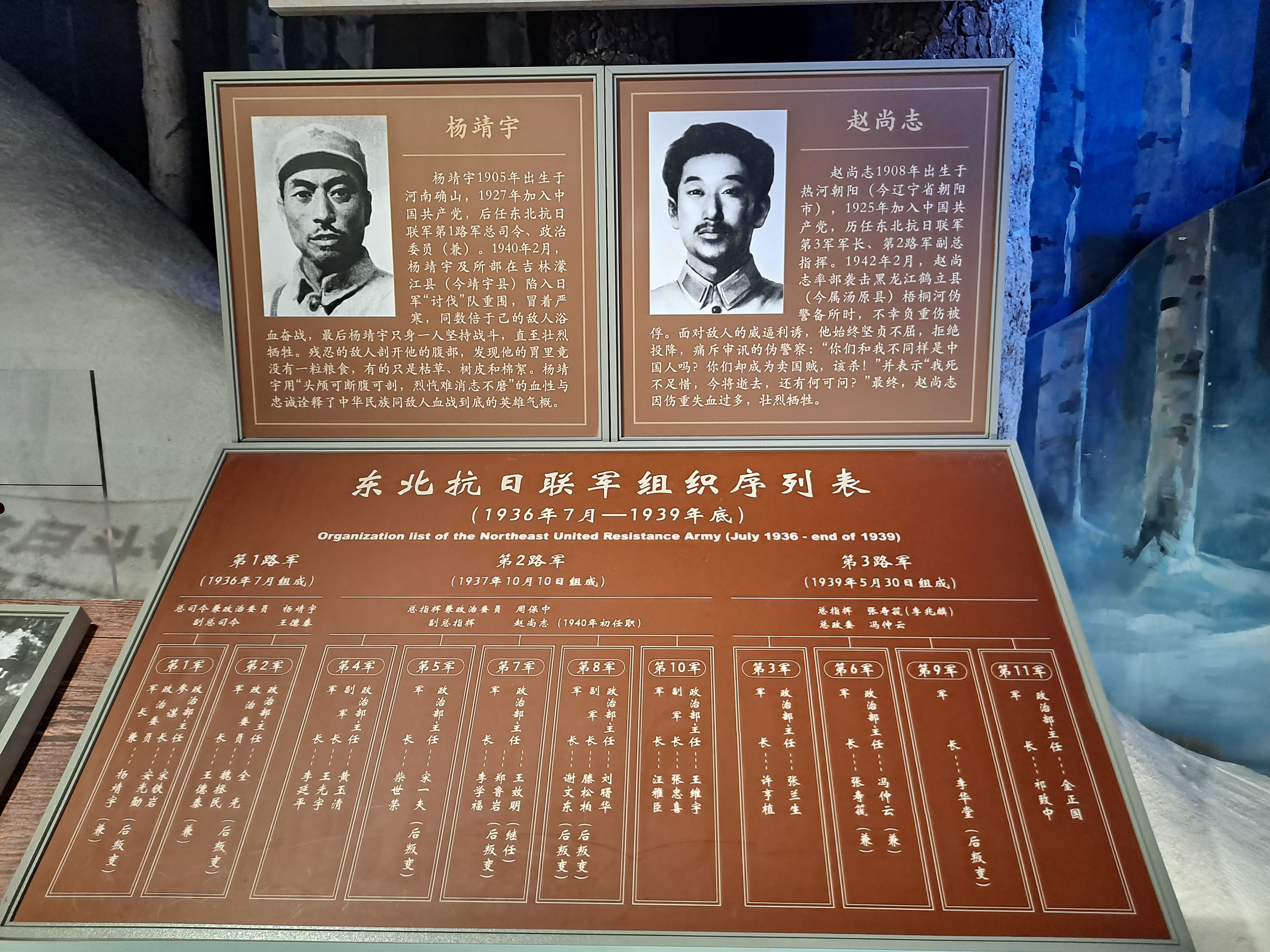
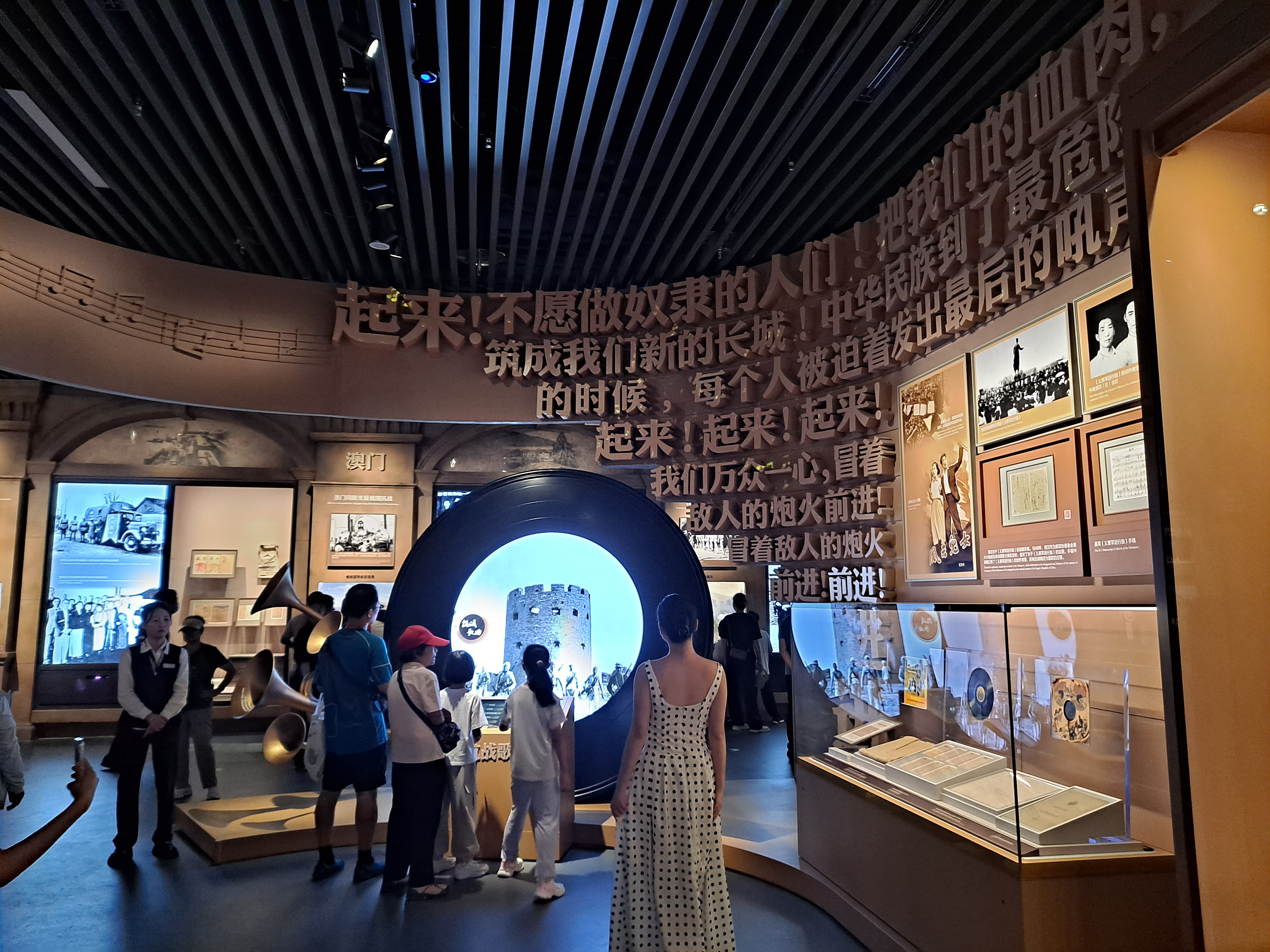
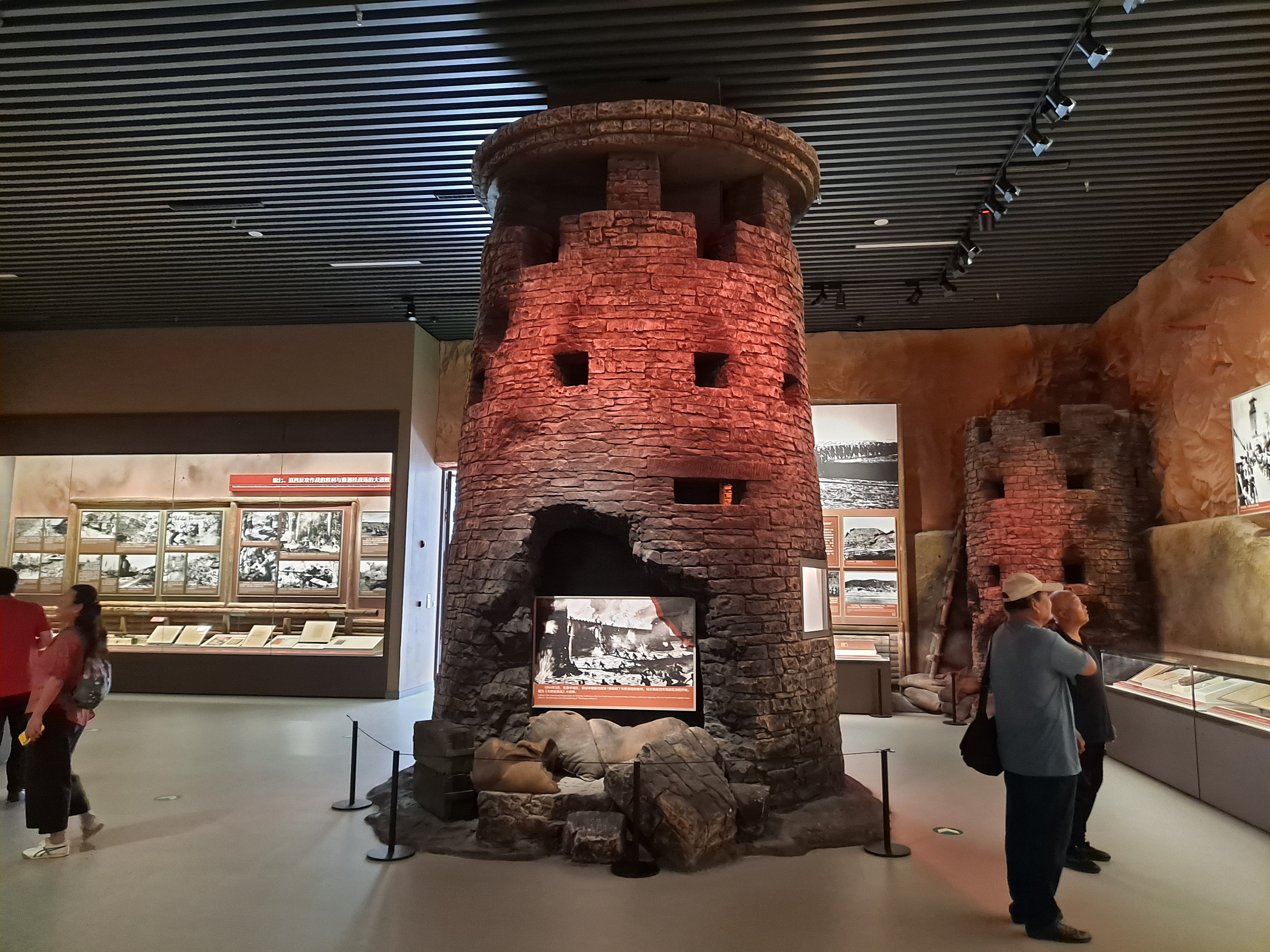
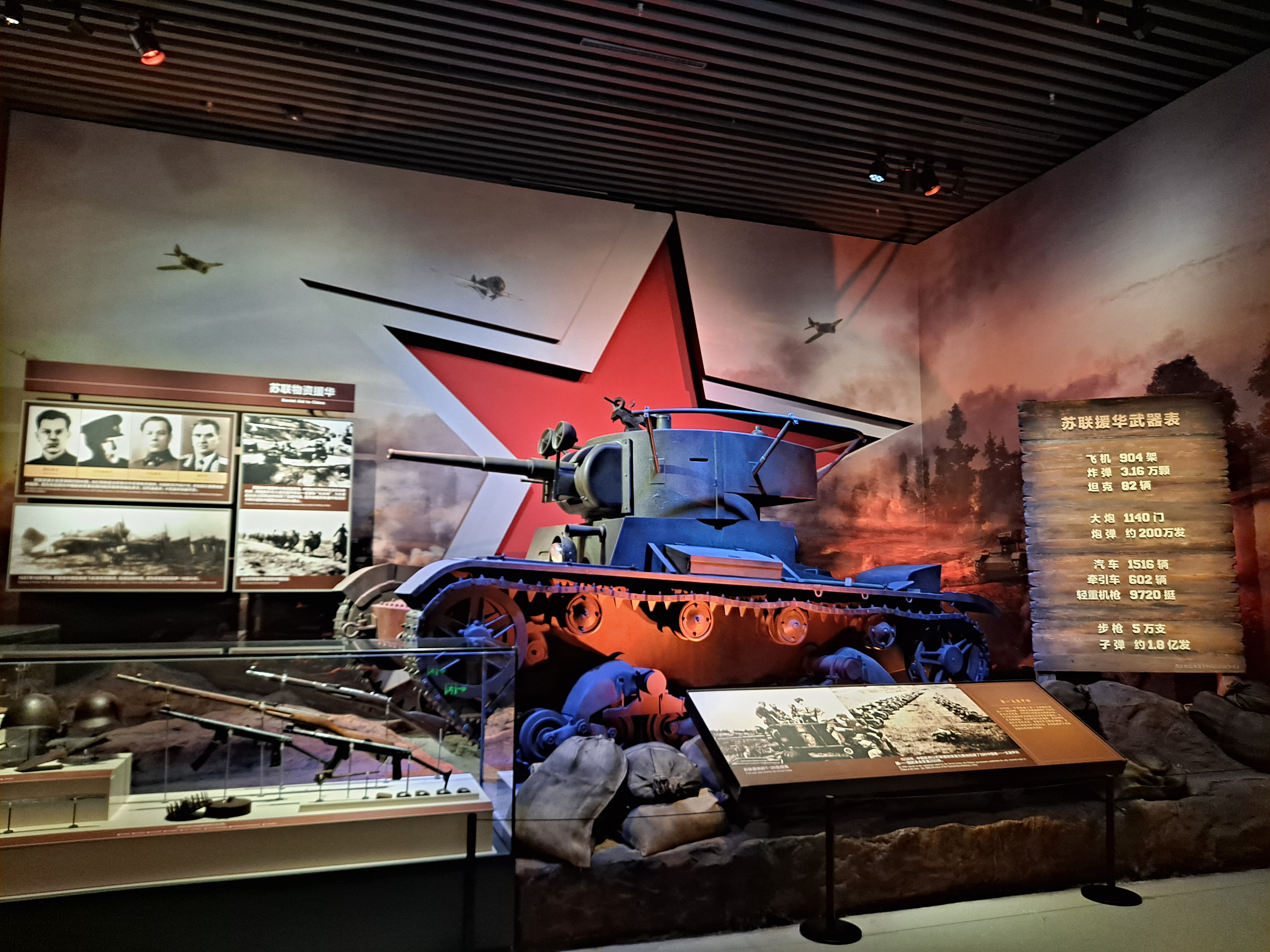
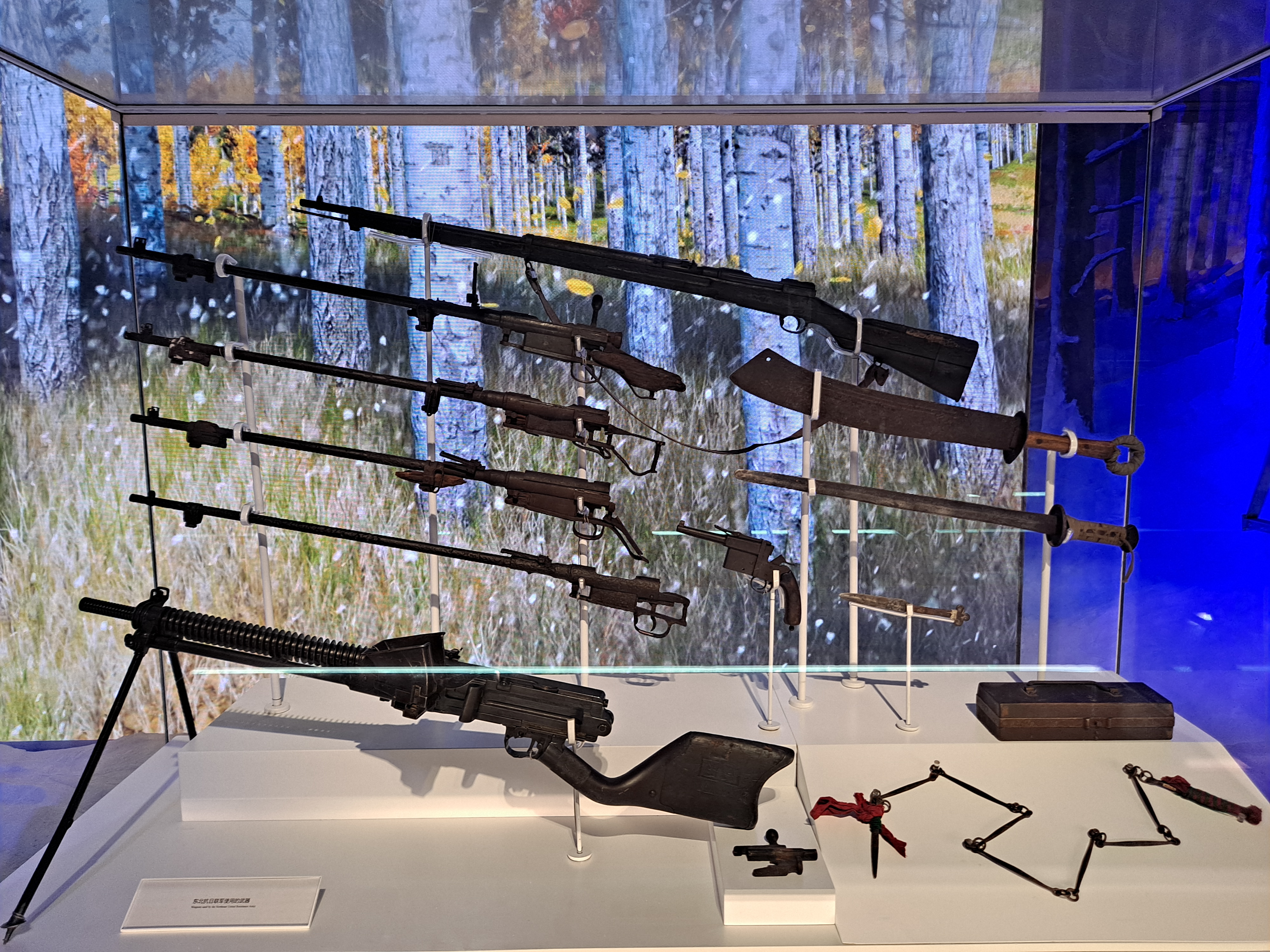
- Established: 1987
- Location: 101 Chengnei St, Fengtai, Beijing, China
- Coordinates: 39.852276°N 116.225807°E
- Website: 1937china.com

The Museum of the War of Chinese People's Resistance Against Japanese Aggression is a museum and memorial hall in Beijing. It is the most comprehensive museum in China about the Second Sino-Japanese War.

The Second Sino-Japanese War was a military conflict fought primarily between the Republic of China and the Empire of Japan from 7 July 1937 to 9 September 1945. It began with the Marco Polo Bridge Incident in 1937 in which a dispute between Japanese and Chinese troops escalated into a battle. The conflict then escalated further into a full-scale war. It ended with the unconditional surrender of Japan on 2 September 1945.

The museum is located inside the Wanping Fortress near the Lugou Bridge (Marco Polo Bridge) in Beijing's Fengtai District, where the Japanese full scale invasion began. It was opened on the 50th anniversary of the outbreak of Second Sino-Japanese War on 7 July 1987.

Since its opening, it has undergone three major and several smaller renovations of the exhibits, the biggest of which was finished in 2005. A significant number of new facilities have been added, such as multimedia displays and video players. The museum both aims at domestic and foreign visitors, and has had several exhibitions outside China over the years.

== Origin and history ==
Supported by the Chinese Communist Party and the national leaders, the organization committee of the Chinese People's Anti-Japanese Memorial Hall was founded in October 1984. Its founding was the result of a national-level campaign in which historian and politician Hu Qiaomu played a central role. The Chinese Academy of Social Sciences and the historian Liu Danian were also important in the museum's founding. It is one of the three major museums in China addressing the War of Resistance.

On 7 July 1987, the memorial hall was completed and opened to the public on the 50th anniversary of the outbreak of Chinese Anti-Japanese War. Deng Xiaoping, the then Chinese leader, performed the official opening.

For several years beginning in 1993, the museum hosted "Life During the Resistance" Summer Camps, in which children visited a reconstruction of an occupied zone set during the War of Resistance era. The children were given refugee clothes to wear and residence passes to carry, and visited a scene that included "Japanese devils" with loaded rifles, menacing "collaborationist interpreters," and sound effects creating a lifelike scene with the goal of bringing the history of the occupied zones "from books and films to reality[.]" The program was ultimately discontinued due to costs.

On 7 July 1997, the second phase of the project was finished. Jiang Zemin, the General Secretary of the Communist Party at that time personally inscribed a slogan for it. On 7 July 2005, a large-scale exhibition named "Great Victory" was inaugurated.

Since it was founded in 1987, the museum has undergone many developments and took up a new look gradually, especially after its largest renovation in 2005. During the course of its development, this museum has been expanded from 1,320 sq. metres to more than 6,000 sq. metres.

The reason behind the creation of the museum is because economic reforms in China after 1970s "has caused an ideological gap that Beijing fears could lead to social and political fissure", but "the store of political capital that is available to the CCP leadership from their own legacy of rule has nearly run dry", especially when Mao also became a contested problematic figure, who no longer exist as the symbolic power that united China in the 1950s. The museum then put forward the new official narrative with stronger rhetoric against Japan and a subsequent downgrading of fierce attacks on the Nationalist Party under Chiang Kai-shek during WWII.

== Layout of the hall ==
The museum boasts 30,000 square meters and is divided up into 4 main halls. Visitors will first enter into the Main Hall, which shows the Japanese invasion from 1931 to 1945 in chronological order. Second is the Hall of Japanese Military Atrocities. As stated in the name, the Hall shows the atrocities the Japanese military committed against the Chinese people by using statistics and "descriptive displays." Third is Hall of the People's War, which describes the CCP's strategic use of guerrilla warfare during the Japanese invasion of China and emphasizes the role played by the Chinese Communist Party in holding off the Japanese invasion. Last is the Hall of Martyrs of the War of Resistance, which is not a display like the other halls, but a monument to those martyrs. In the centre of this hall is a statue of the Unknown Martyr. There are also four relief sculptures and name tablets that have the names of fallen soldiers.

The museum uses various techniques to create a solemn atmosphere in the museum. The museum uses emotional language and varied tones to help emphasize the Japanese atrocities against the Chinese people. One of the most important and most used techniques is the use of dioramas.

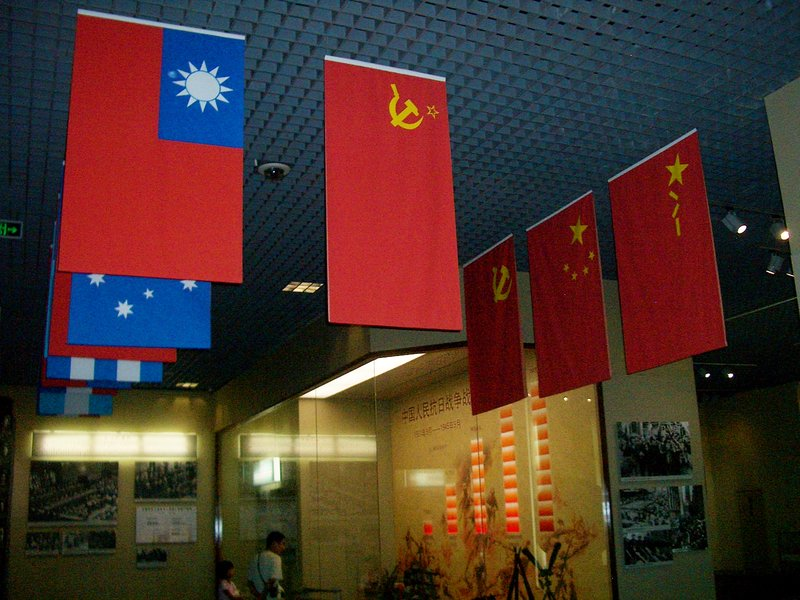
In the museum

The Hall of the Marco Polo Bridge Incident was opened on 7 July 1988. It is the first art hall which represents the Second Sino-Japanese War that employs techniques of painting, sculpture, magic lantern and acoustics to exhibit the theme. The hall, with a semicircle screen of 16.5 metres high and 50 metres long, plays documentaries of the Lugou Incident.

The exhibition halls of the museum also display some inscriptions from celebrities and some print, cartoons and picture posters of the Anti-Japanese War period.

An exhibition named "Final Victory in the Anti-Japanese War"

The year of 2005 marks the 60th anniversary of the victory of Second Sino-Japanese War (Chinese: 中国抗日战争) as well as the world anti-fascist war. In February, 2005 the central government of China arranged series of memorial activities, to which the large-scale exhibition carried out in Chinese People's Anti-Japanese Memorial Hall, served as a significant prelude. Organized and supported by 8 departments of the central government and PLA, the exhibition kept the demands proposed by the CPC General Secretary Hu Jintao as its guiding doctrine, that is "Chinese people should cherish peace, work convertedly to create a bright future, while keeping the history in mind." Covering an area of 6,350 sq.m., the exhibition consists of 8 sections, each of which concentrates on and puts emphasis on different phrases of the Chinese People's Anti-Japanese war:

- the national crisis Chinese people faced in that time and the resure activities waged by patriots and people of insight.
- Cooperation of the National Revolutionary Army and the People's Liberation Army in front of the invasion.
- Elaborates the main function of China's Communist Party.
- Behavior of the Japanese army toward Chinese people.
- Brave Chinese people
- Support from the international community.
- Contribution Chinese made to the world "in the victory in the anti-fascist war".
- Summary and lessons learned

Based on the lasting achievements of the research on the Chinese People's Anti-Japanese war, the exhibition demonstrated a great number of exhibits of various types, including 587 photographs, over 830 relics, 22 groups of sculptures, 14 oil paintings, 10 scenes imitating the war and 165 pieces of assisting exhibits.

Beginning in 2018, the museum features China's Righteous Among the Nations and other Chinese figures who helped Jews escape Europe.

== Transport connections ==
The museum is located inside the Wanping Fortress, near the Marco Polo Bridge (Lugou Bridge): the site of the Marco Polo Bridge Incident which brought the war from Manchuria into China proper. The fortress is situated in Beijing's southwestern Fengtai District.

The bus stop serving the fortress and the museum is called the Garden of sculptures of Sino-Japanese War. It is served by Wanpingcheng station on Line 16 of Beijing Subway. It is also accessible by bus No. 624, 693, 983 from Wukesong station and bus No. 301, 309, 339, 661, 662, 715 from Liuliqiao station.

== Important visitors ==
- Prime Minister of Japan Tomiichi Murayama visited the Hall in May 1995.
- CPC General Secretary Jiang Zemin visited the large-scale exhibition named Great Victory on 30 August 2005.
- On 14 August 2005 the General Secretary of the CPC central committee Hu Jintao visited the Hall.
- On 7 July 2005 chairman of the NPC standing committee Wu Bangguo visited the Hall.
- On 7 July 2014 General Secretary of the Communist Party Xi Jinping visited the Hall.
