= Ji Xingwen =

General in the Republic of China Army (b. 1908, d. 1958)

Ji Xingwen 吉星文
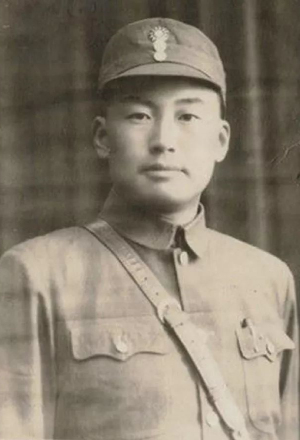
- Born: 27 March 1907; Fugou, Henan, China
- Died: 26 August 1958 (aged 51); Kinmen, Fujian, Republic of China
- Military career
- Allegiance: Republic of China
- Branch: (Republic of China (1912–1949)) National Revolutionary Army; Republic of China Army (from 1947)
- Rank: Lieutenant General
- Units: 110th Brigade, 37th Division, 29th Army
- Commands: 219th Regiment
- Conflicts: Second Sino-Japanese War; Marco Polo Bridge Incident; Chinese Civil War; Battle of Kuningtou; Second Taiwan Strait Crisis †

Ji Xingwen (Chinese: 吉星文; pinyin: Jí Xīngwén; 27 March 1907 – 26 August 1958), courtesy name Shaowu (Chinese: 紹武; pinyin: Shàowǔ), was a Chinese lieutenant general in the National Revolutionary Army. He fought in the Second Sino-Japanese War and the Chinese Civil War and was killed in action during the Second Taiwan Strait Crisis.

== Early life ==
Ji was born in Fugou County, Henan Province, at his ancestral home in Hancheng, Shaanxi. He completed his education in Advanced Studies at the Republic of China Military Academy.

== Second Sino-Japanese War ==
Ji became famous across China for his presence at the Marco Polo Bridge Incident and the battles that followed. As a colonel, Ji was the regimental commander of the 219th Regiment, 110th Brigade, 37th Division, 29th Army.

Ji received a telephone message from the commander of Japanese forces in the area regarding a Japanese soldier that went missing after a military exercise. The Japanese commander claimed that his soldier, Private Kikujiro Shimura, was missing and that they suspected the soldier had been abducted by the Chinese. In fact, he had gotten lost while relieving himself on his way back from the exercise and found his way back to his unit hours later.

The Japanese commander demanded permission to enter Wanping to investigate. Colonel Ji refused the search demand. The Japanese Army had fabricated several similar incidents during that period in order to encroach on Chinese territory. With the Japanese demand unfulfilled, at about 5:30 am on July 8, the Japanese began shelling the bridge and Wanping, launching an assault on the Chinese position at Wanping.

When the Japanese attacked the bridge from the rear, Ji led defenses with about 100 men and was ordered to hold the bridge at all costs. By the afternoon, the Japanese had managed to occupy the southern end of the bridge. Chinese reinforcements arrived, and on the morning of July 9, the Chinese retook the bridge under cover of mist and rain.

== Death and legacy ==
On 23 August 1958, he was mortally wounded during the Second Taiwan Strait Crisis bombardment of Kinmen by the People's Liberation Army. He succumbed to his injuries three days later.

Memorials to Ji are found in the war museums of Taipei and Beijing. His son, Ji Mingli, has made appearances to commemorate his father and memorialize the wars he fought in.

== See also ==
- List of Chinese battles in modern China
- List of Battles of Chinese Civil War
