= Wanping Fortress =

Ming Dynasty fortress in Fengtai, Beijing

Coordinates: 39°51′00″N 116°13′12″E

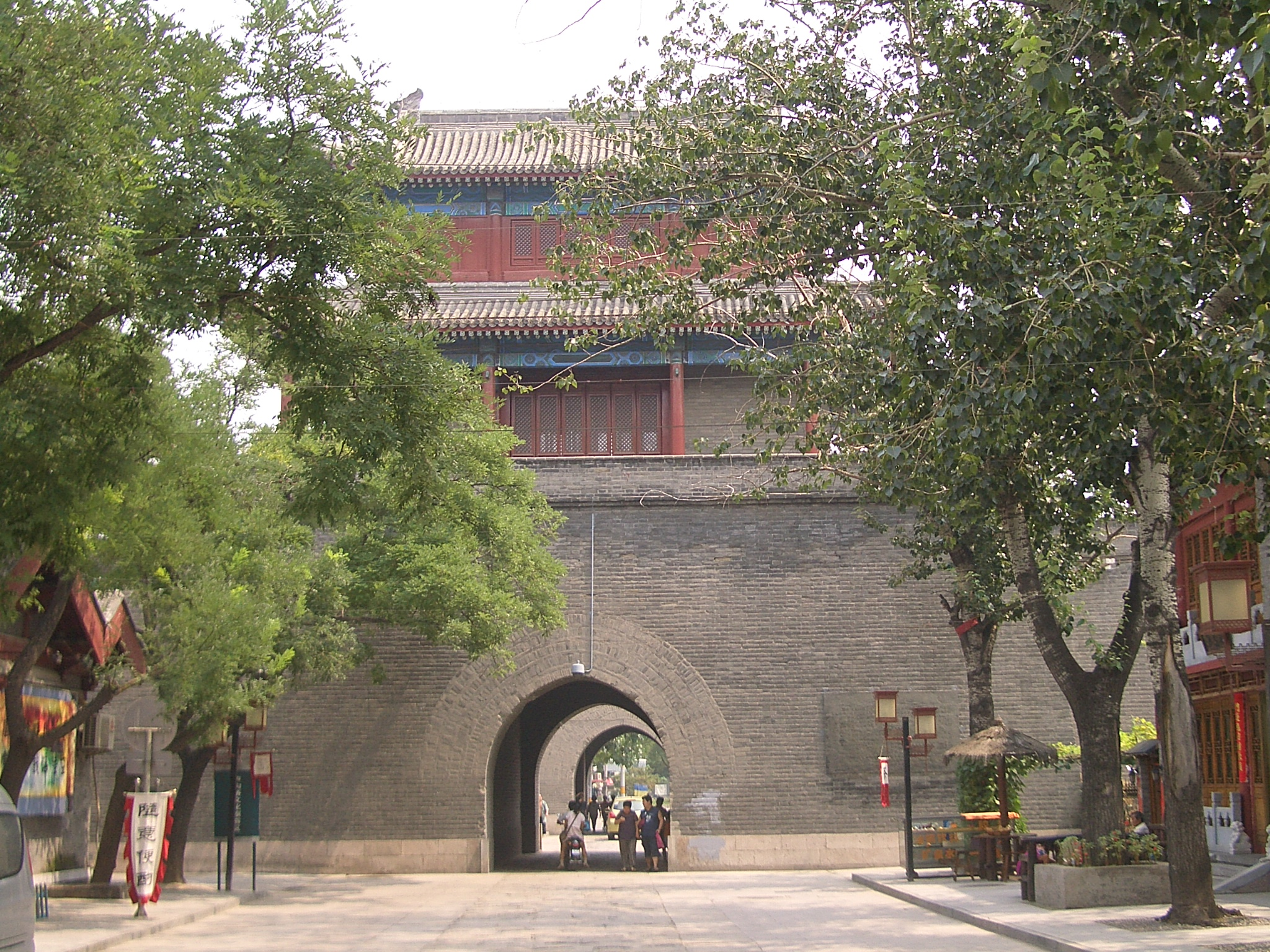
East gate of the Wanping Fortress

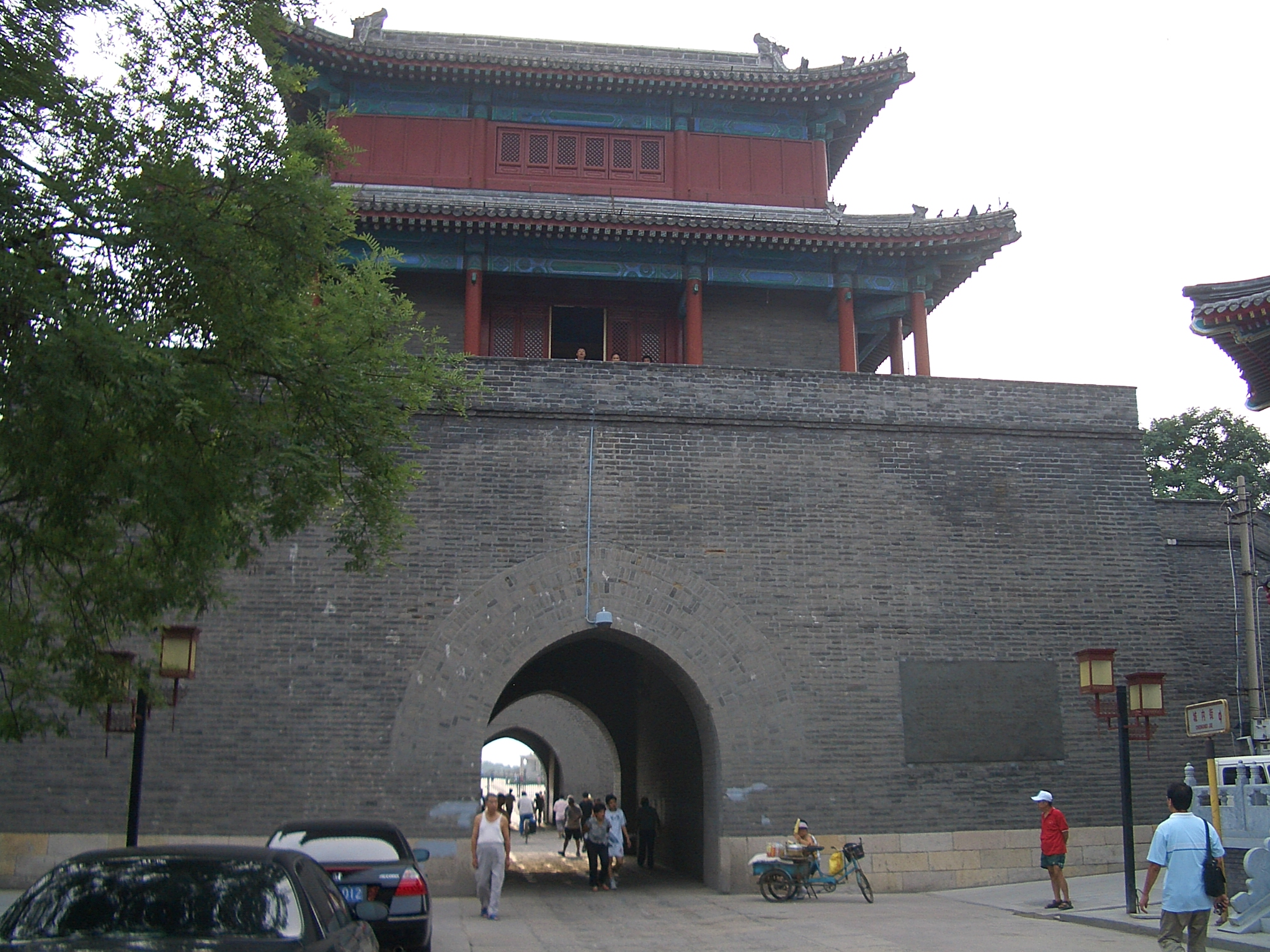
West gate of the Wanping Fortress

Wanping Fortress, also known as Wanping Castle (Chinese: 宛平城; pinyin: Wǎnpíng Chéng), is a Ming Dynasty fortress or "walled city" in Fengtai District, Beijing. It was erected in 1638–1640, with the purpose of defending Beijing against Li Zicheng and the peasant uprising.

From the beginning, it functioned as a military fortress. From west to east, it measures 640 meters (2,100 ft), and from south to the north 320 meters (1,050 ft), making it a half-square shape.

The fortress has two gates: the east gate, named Ever Prosperous Gate (永昌門, Yongchangmen), then renamed as Majestic Gate (威嚴門, Weiyanmen), and the west gate, named Favorably Govern Gate (順治門, Shunzhimen).

Wanping witnessed the incident in July 1937 that is reckoned to mark the start of the Second Sino-Japanese War, with an exchange of fire over a minor case of a Japanese soldier missing from his post. For reasons unknown, this escalated into full-scale combat. It is known as the Marco Polo Bridge Incident, and also the Lugou Bridge Incident.

The Museum of the War of Chinese People's Resistance Against Japanese Aggression, surrounded by a plaza and park with numerous sculptures, occupies a large portion of the space inside the fortress' walls.

To the west of the fortress are the Yongding River and the Lugou Bridge (Marco Polo Bridge, 蘆溝橋).

== Transport ==
It is served by Wanpingcheng station of Beijing Subway Line 16.

== Gallery ==
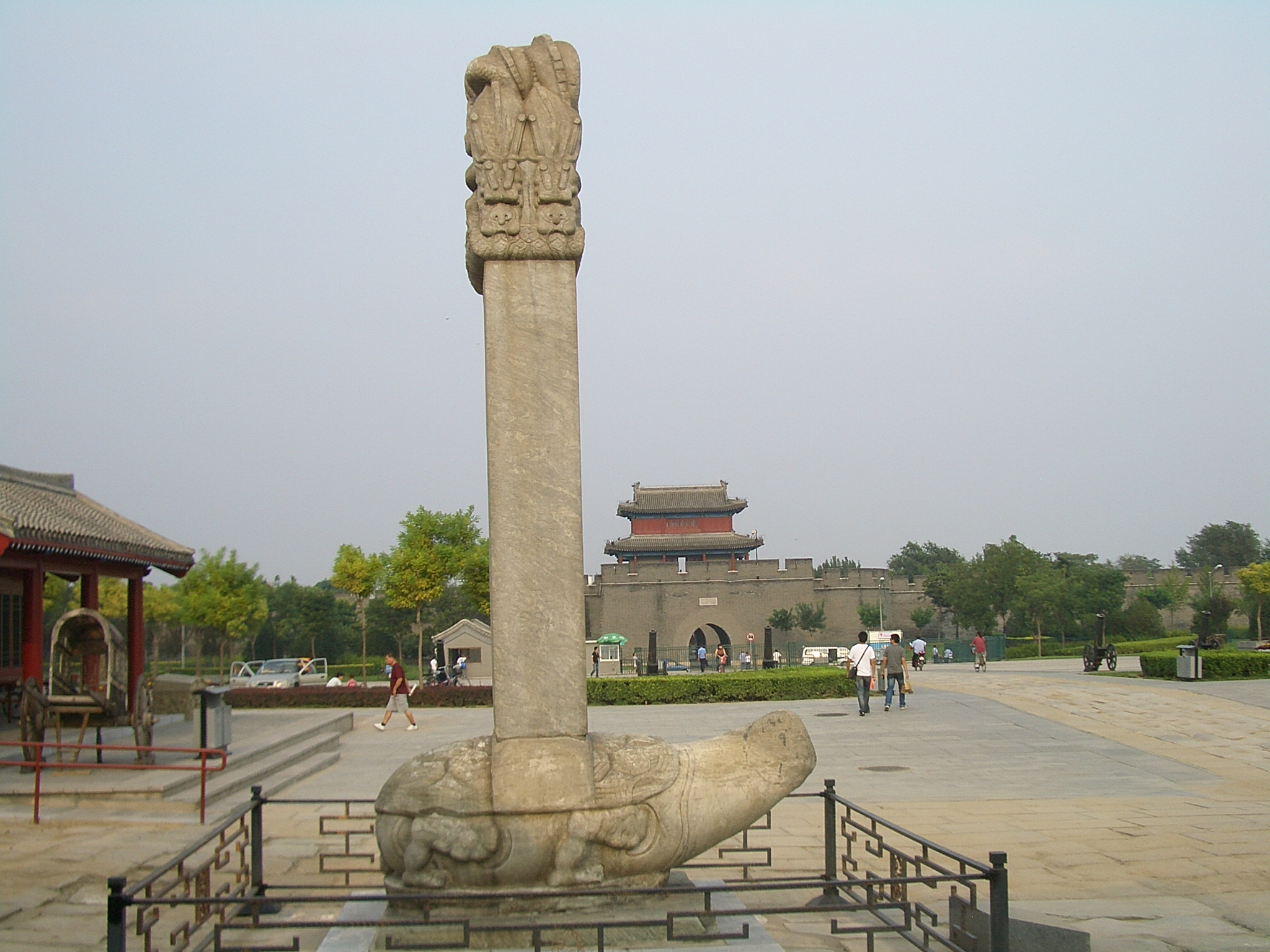
The west gate of the Wanping Fortress seen from a distance

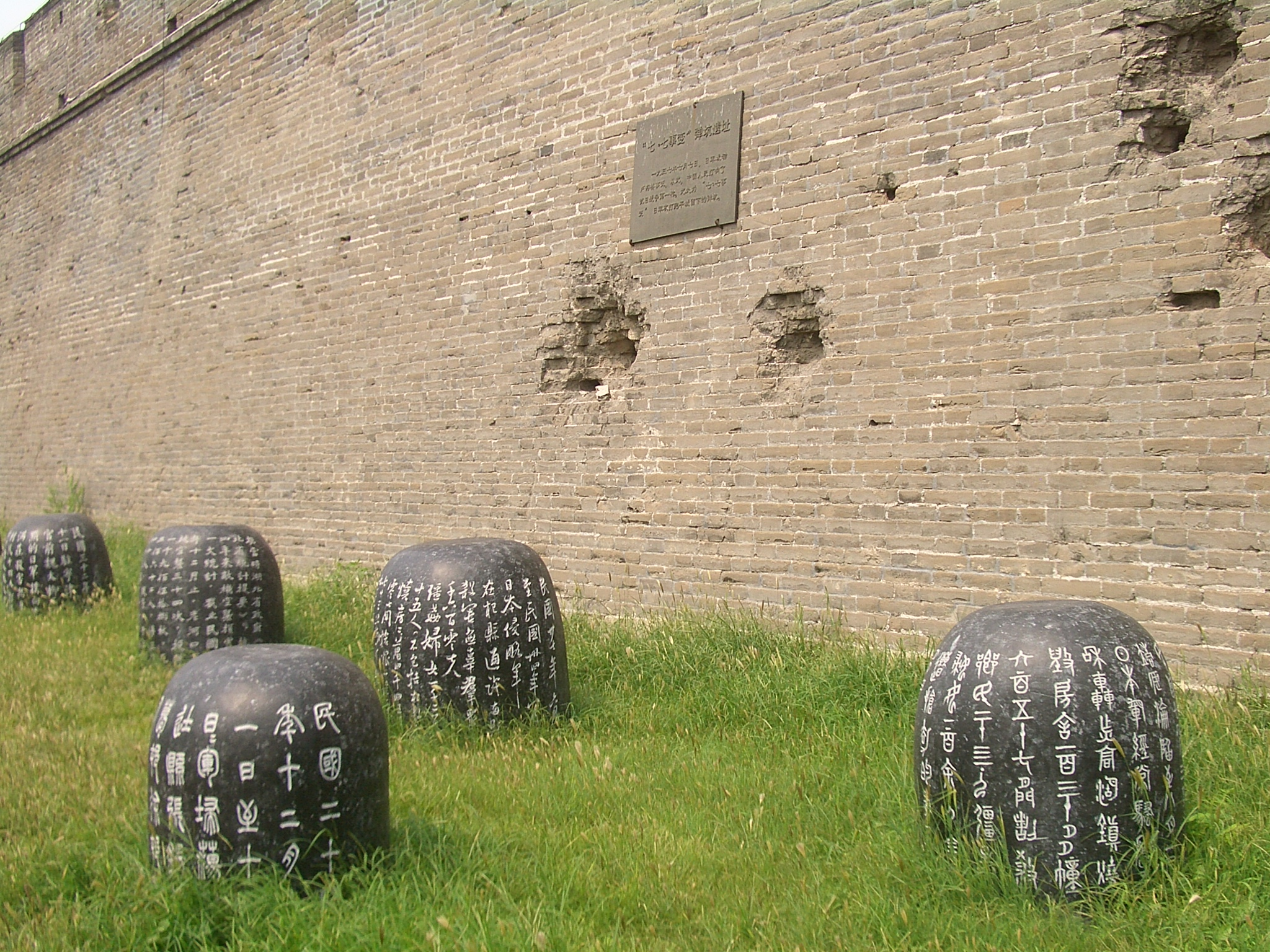
The fortress walls were damaged by Japanese shells during the Marco Polo Bridge Incident.

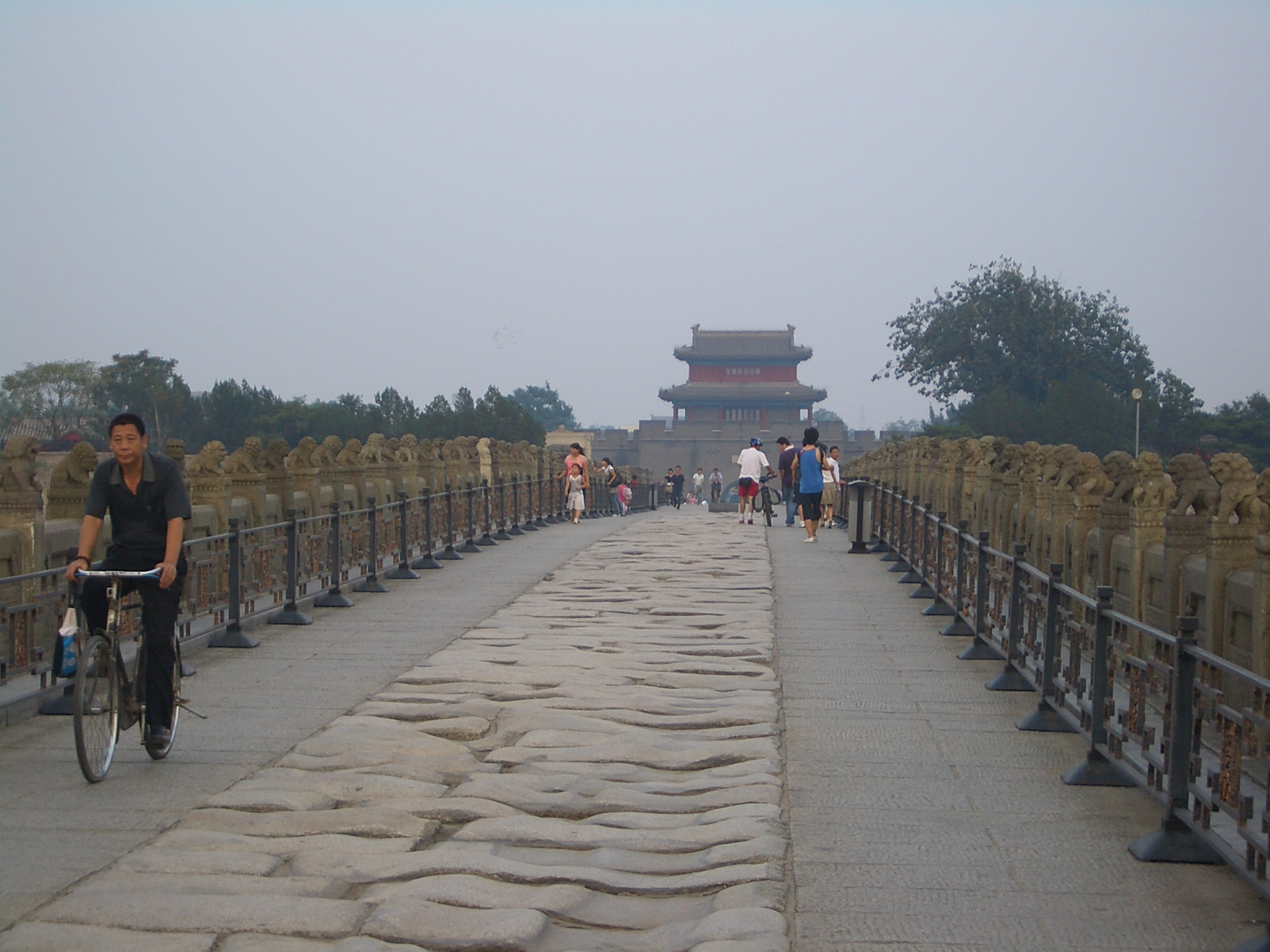
The Wanping Fortress as seen from the Lugou Bridge

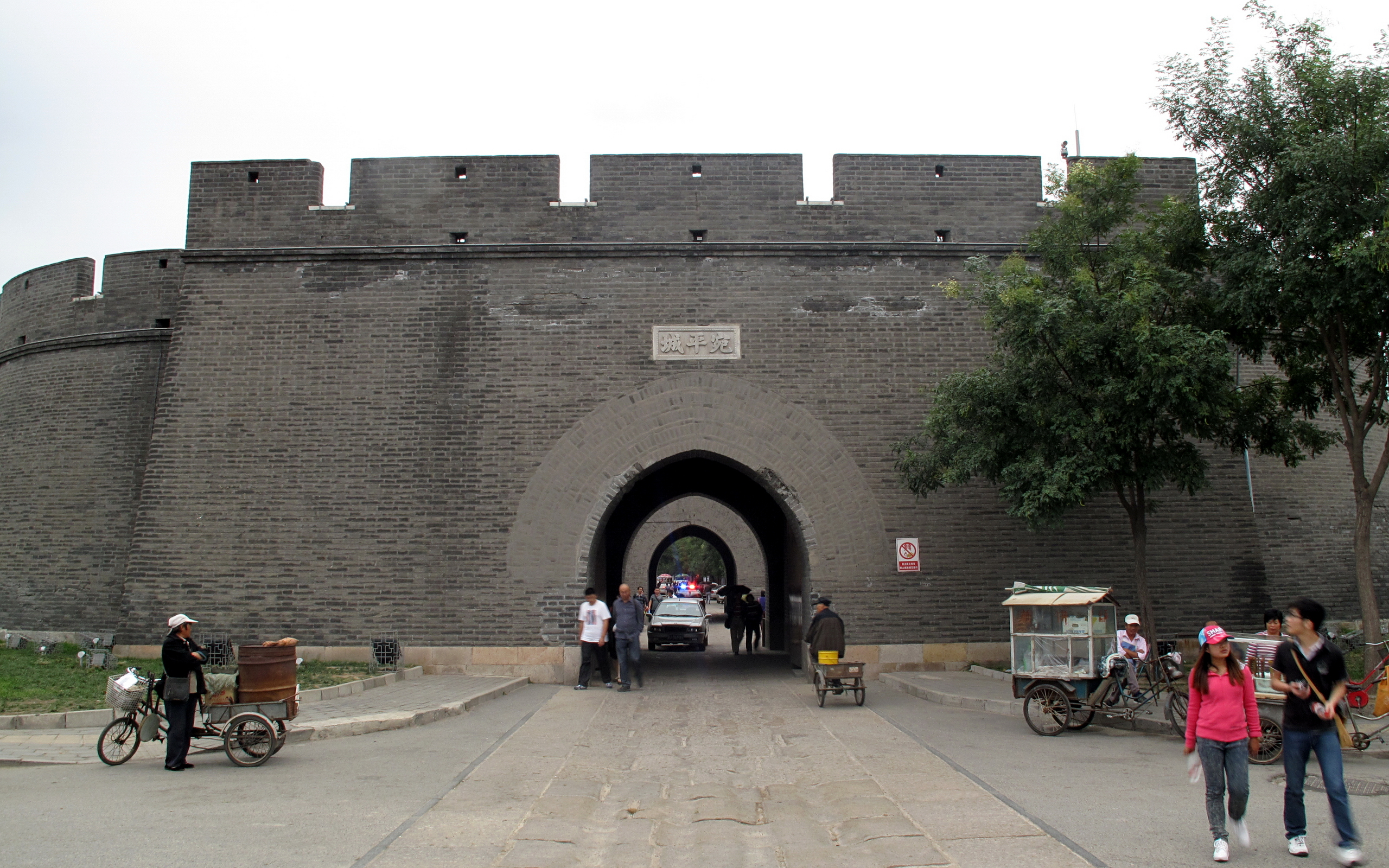
Wall of the west gate

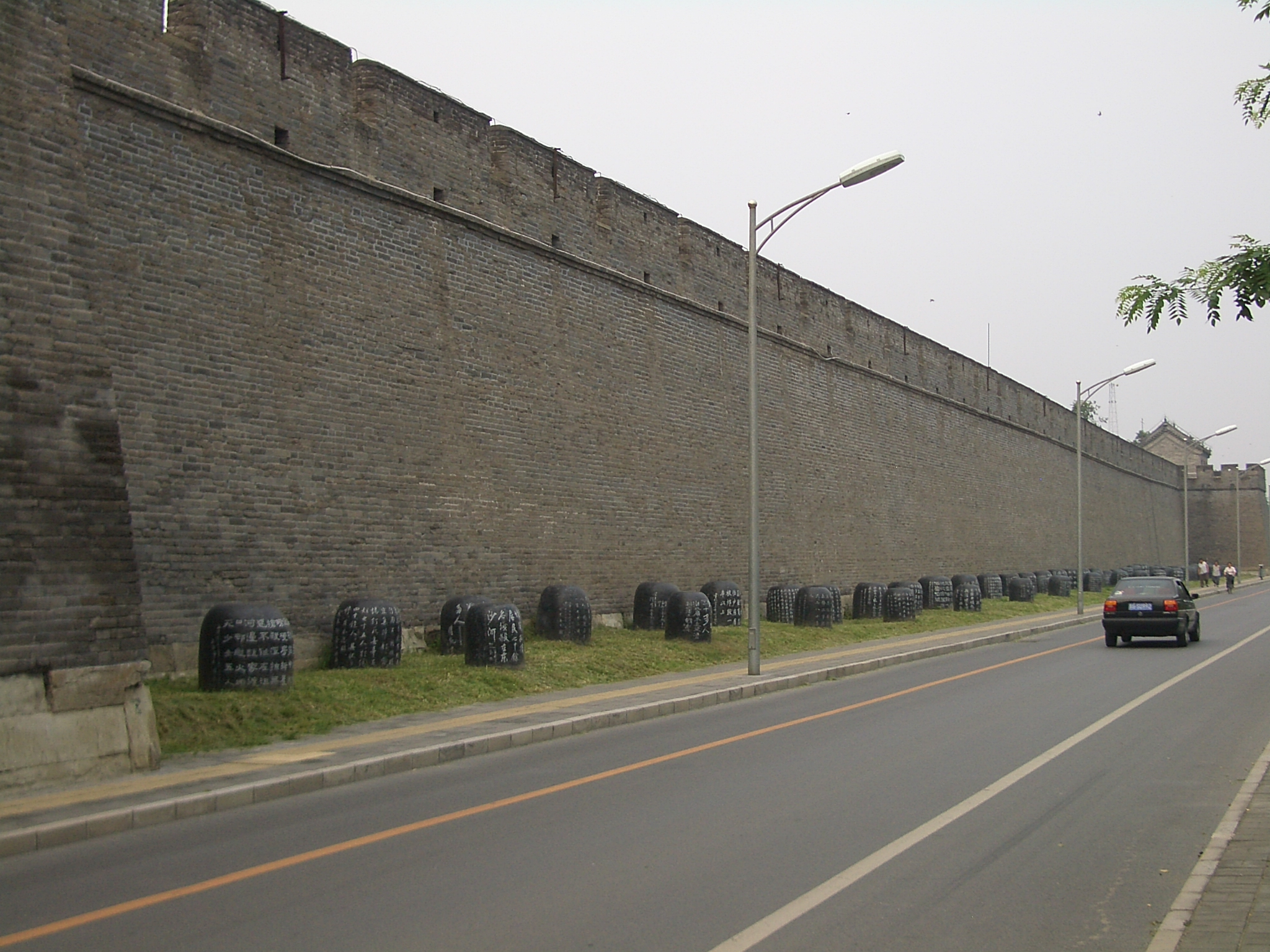
The walls of the fortress
