= Lugouqiao Subdistrict =

Lugouqiao Subdistrict 卢沟桥街道
- Subdistrict
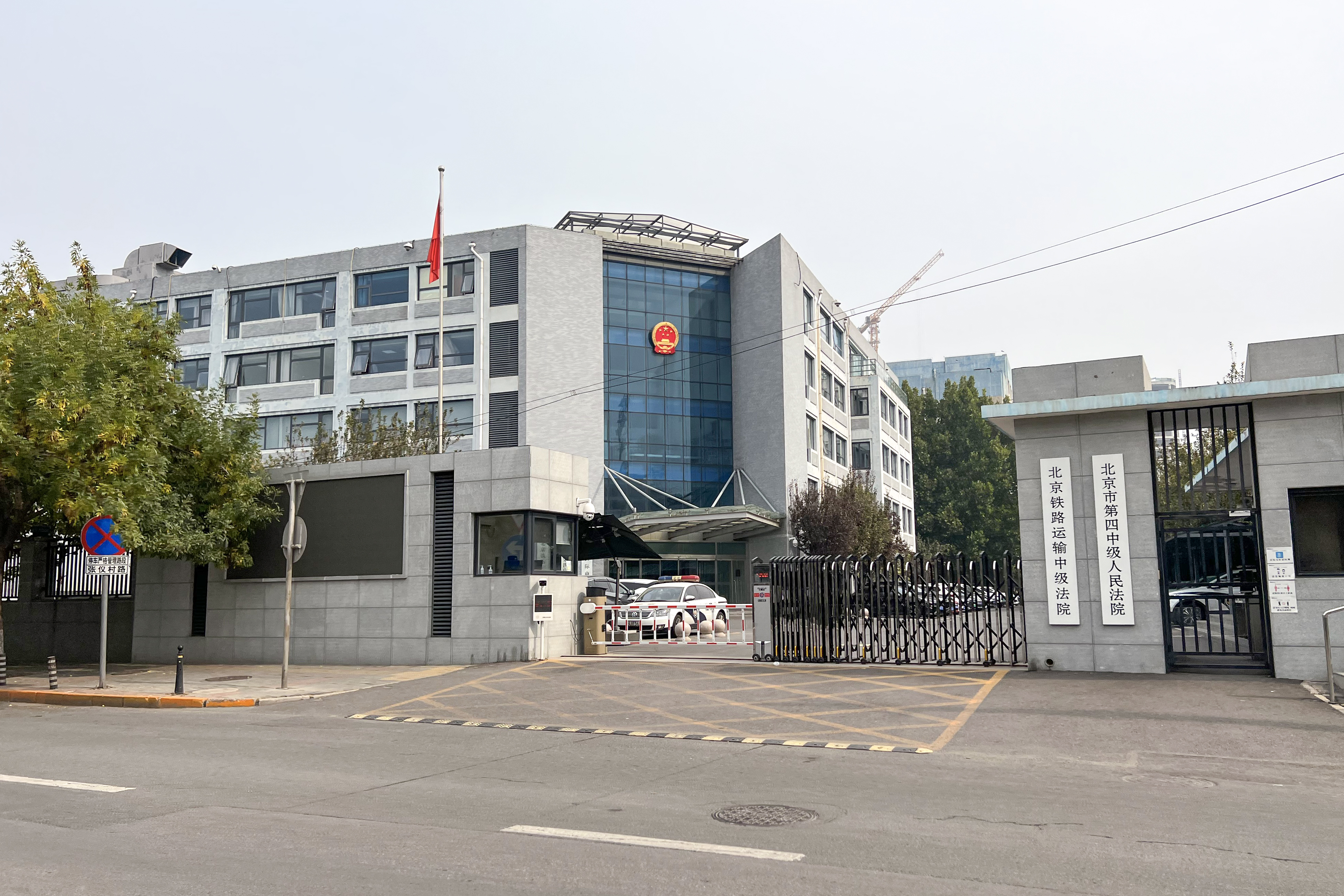
- Beijing No. 4 Intermediate People's Court within the subdistrict, 2022

- Location within Beijing Location within China
- Coordinates: 39°52′13″N 116°16′52″E
- Country: China
- Municipality: Beijing
- District: Fengtai
- Village-level Divisions: 14 communities 6 village

Area
  - Total: 28.48 km^{2} (11.00 sq mi)

Population (2020)
  - Total: 112,087
  - Density: 3,936/km^{2} (10,190/sq mi)
- Time zone: UTC+8 (China Standard)
- Postal code: 100161
- Area code: 010

Lugouqiao Subdistrict (Chinese: 卢沟桥街道; pinyin: Lúgōuqiáo Jiēdào), formerly Lugouqiao Township, is a subdistrict located at the northern end of Fengtai District, Beijing, China. It borders Lugu, Babaoshan, Taipingqiao and Guang'anmenwai Subdistricts to the north, You'anmen Subdistrict to the east, Xincun Subdistrict, Huaxiang and Wanpingcheng Townships to the south, Changxindian Town and Lugu Subdistrict to the west. It has a population of 112,087 within its administrative area as of the 2020 census.

The subdistrict's name (Chinese: 卢沟桥; lit. 'Lu Ditch Bridge'), is the native Chinese name for Marco Polo Bridge, located at Yongding River on the southwest part of the subdistrict.

== History ==
Timeline of Lugouqiao Subdistrict
Year	Status
1912	Part of the 4th District of Beijing and Wanping County
1949	Western portion was part of Fengtai District, while the east a part of Baiyunguan District
1953	Established as a township
1956	5 farming cooperatives and townships were created in the area, including Lugouqiao
1958	The following five cooperatives merged to form People's Commune of Lugouqiao Dongfanghong: Lugouqiao; Xiaotun; Yuegezhuang; Xiaojing; Sanluju
1964	The commune was renamed to People's Commune of Lugouqiao Sino-Romanian Friendship
1983	Reformed into a rural bureau
1987	Reformed into a township
1989	Part of the township was separated and formed Taipingqiao Subdistrict
1990	Part of the township was separated and formed Wanpingcheng Township
2005	Jingtu village was incorporated into Taipingqiao Subdistrict
2010	Became an area while retaining township status
2021	Reformed into a subdistrict

== Administrative Division ==
In 2023, Lugouqiao Subdistrict has direct jurisdiction over 20 subdivisions, including 14 communities and 6 villages:

Administrative Division Code	Community Names	Name Transliteration	Type
110106017005	同馨家园	Tongxin JIayuan	Community
110106017006	小瓦窑西里	Xiaowayao Xili	Community
110106017007	小屯	Xiaotun	Community
110106017008	大瓦窑	Dawayao	Community
110106017009	假日万恒	Jiari Wanheng	Community
110106017010	美域家园	Meiyu Jiayuan	Community
110106017011	建邦枫景	Jianbang Fengjing	Community
110106017012	丰泽家园	Fengze Jiayuan	Community
110106017013	假日风景	Jiari Fengjing	Community
110106017014	康馨家园北区	Kangxin Jiayuan Beiqu	Community
110106017015	康馨家园南区	Kangxin Jiayuan Nanqu	Community
110106017016	莲玉嘉园	Lianyujiayuan	Community
110106017017	春风雅筑	Chunfengyazhu	Community
110106017018	兆丰园	Zhaofengyuan	Community
110106017213	大井	Dajing	Village
110106017214	小屯	Xiaotun	Village
110106017215	小瓦窑	Xiaowayao	Village
110106017216	张仪	Zhangyi	Village
110106017217	郭庄子	Guozhuangzi	Village
110106017219	大瓦窑	Dawayao	Village

== Landmark ==
- Marco Polo Bridge

== See also ==
- List of township-level divisions of Beijing
