= Marco Polo Bridge =

Arch bridge near Beijing, China

Lugou Bridge 盧溝橋
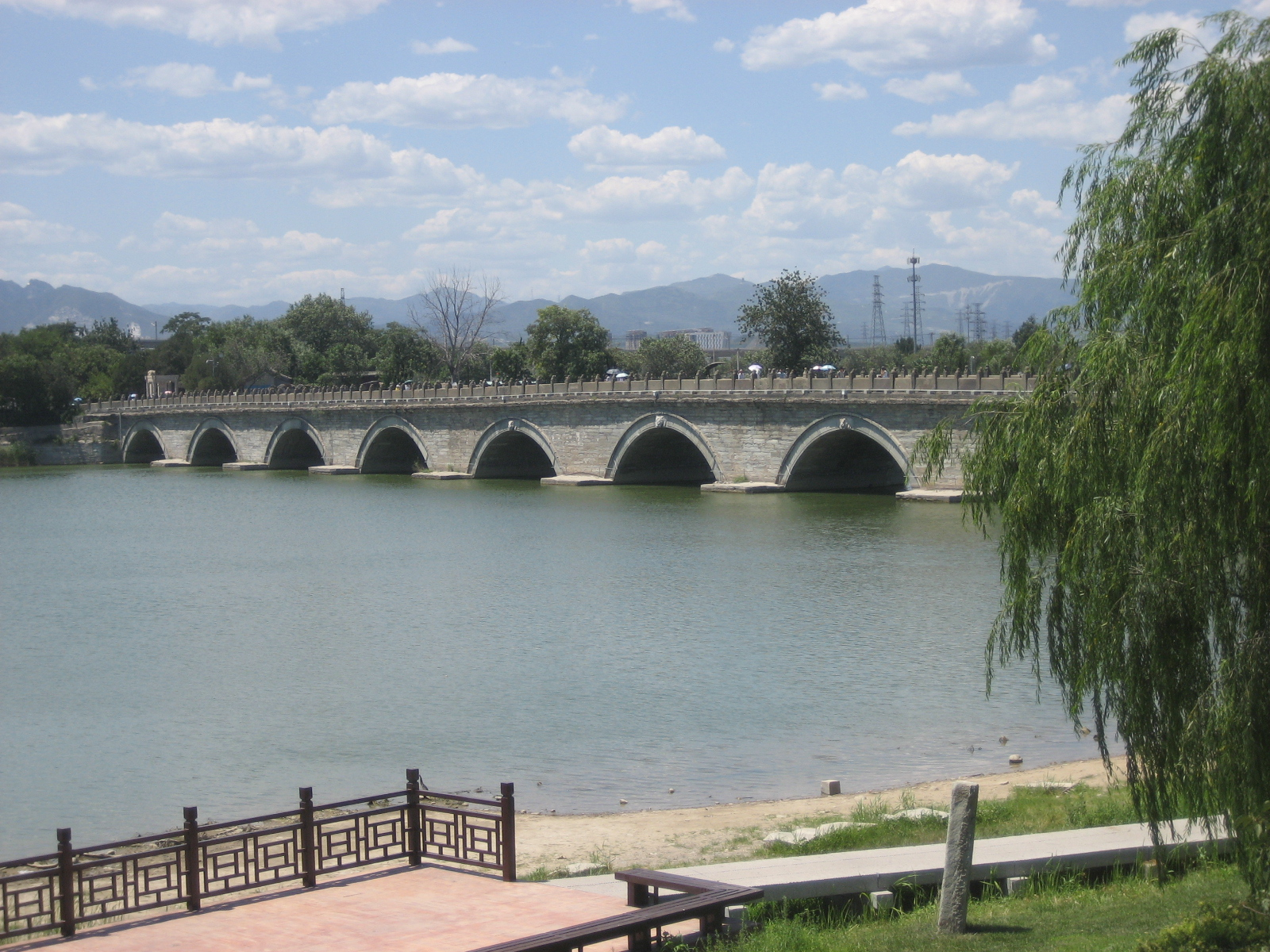
- Coordinates: 39°50′57″N 116°12′47″E
- Locale: Fengtai District, Beijing
- Other name: Marco Polo Bridge

Characteristics
- Total length: 266.5 m
- Width: 9.3 m
- No. of spans: 11
- Piers in water: 10

History
- Construction end: 1192 (original bridge); 1698 (reconstruction)

Location
- Interactive map of Lugou Bridge

Marco Polo Bridge
- Traditional Chinese: 盧溝橋
- Simplified Chinese: 卢沟桥
- Literal meaning: Lu Ditch Bridge
Transcriptions
Standard Mandarin
- Hanyu Pinyin: Lúgōu Qiáo
- Wade–Giles: Lu-kou Chiao

The Marco Polo Bridge or Lugou Bridge (simplified Chinese: 卢沟桥; traditional Chinese: 盧溝橋; pinyin: Lúgōu Qiáo) is a stone bridge located 15 km southwest of Beijing's city center in the Fengtai District. It bridges the Yongding River, a major tributary of Hai River. Situated at the eastern end of the bridge is the Wanping Fortress, a historic 17th-century fortress, with the Museum of the War of Chinese People's Resistance Against Japanese Aggression inside.

The Marco Polo Bridge is well known because it was highly praised by the Venetian traveler Marco Polo during his visit to China in the 13th century (leading the bridge to become known in Europe simply as the Marco Polo Bridge), and for the 20th-century Marco Polo Bridge Incident, which marked the beginning of the Second Sino-Japanese War (1937–1945).

In recent years, the water of Yongding River has been diverted to different areas of Beijing, so there is often no water under the bridge.

== Names ==
The name "Marco Polo Bridge" derives from the appearance, before its reconstruction, in Marco Polo's book of travels, where he praised it highly. The names "Lugou" or "Lukou Bridge" and "Lugouqiao" or "Lukouchiao" derive from Lugou, a former name of the Yongding. In old bilingual plates, the bridge was also named as "Lu Kow Kiao".

== History ==
Over this river there is a very fine stone bridge, so fine indeed, that it has very few equals in the world.

— The Travels of Marco Polo

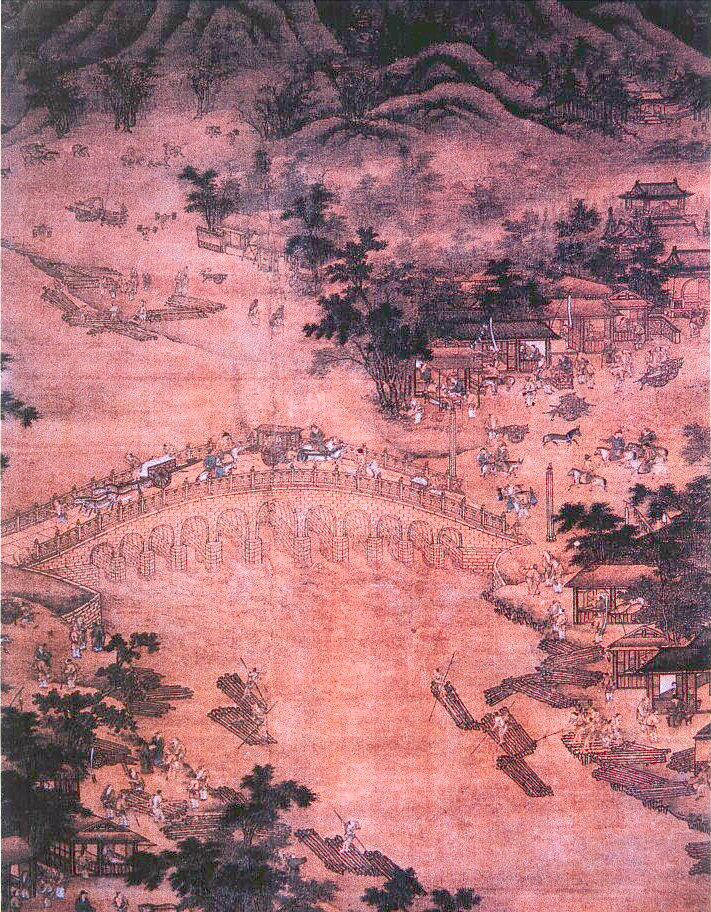
The original Marco Polo Bridge

Construction of the original bridge on this site commenced in 1189, the final year of Emperor Shizong of Jin's reign and was completed under his successor in 1192. Following damage from a flooding, the bridge was reconstructed under the Kangxi Emperor of the Qing dynasty in 1698.

The bridge was highly praised by the Venetian traveler Marco Polo during his visit to China in the 13th century, leading the bridge to become known in Europe simply as the "Marco Polo Bridge". The Chinese structural engineer Mao Yisheng bestowed similar praise, once opining that "the most ancient bridge in China is the Zhaozhou Bridge, the most splendid the Lugou Bridge, and the most elegant and artistic the Five-Pavilion Bridge."

The bridge was also the location of the Marco Polo Bridge Incident, which marked the beginning of the Second Sino-Japanese War (1937–1945).

Following the Communist takeover of China in 1949, the bridge was decked in asphalt and carried motor vehicular traffic. To alleviate traffic on the bridge, the New Marco Polo Bridge (Chinese: 蘆溝新橋; pinyin: Lúgōu Xīnqiáo) located about 1 km to the south was completed in 1971. Later, due to the cultural and historical significance of the old bridge, it was decided that the old bridge be preserved, and another new bridge was to be built to take over the vehicular traffic. The new bridge, which carries the Jingshi Expressway, was built next to the New Marco Polo Bridge in 1985. After the completion of the Jingshi Expressway bridge, vehicular traffic was shifted to the two new bridges and the old Marco Polo Bridge was closed to motor vehicles. The asphalt surface of the old bridge was removed during a restoration in 1986.

== Structure ==
The Marco Polo Bridge is 266.5 meters (874 ft) in length and 9.3 m (30.5 ft) in width, supported on 10 piers and 11 segmental arches. (Note: The number of "legs", or piers, is correct here, even though with X arches one would expect X+1 piers. The "discrepancy" is that each end, or abutment, does not count as a pier. Were they to be counted, one would have the proper number of piers (12) for the 11 arches mentioned.) Hundreds of artistically unique stone lions from different eras line both sides of the bridge. The most intriguing feature of these beasts is the fact that there are more lions hiding on the head, back or under the belly or on paws of each of the big lions. Investigations to determine the total number of animals have been carried out on several occasions but the results have proved inconsistent, ranging anywhere from 482 to 501. However, record has it that there were originally a total of 627 lions. The posture of each lion varies, as do their ages. Most date from the Ming (1368–1644) and Qing (1644–1911) dynasties, some are from the earlier Yuan dynasty (1271–1368), while the few lions dating from as long ago as the Jin dynasty (1115–1234) are now quite rare.

Four ornamental columns each 4.65 m (15 ft) high and a white marble stele stand at the ends of the bridge. One stele, installed on top of a stone tortoise, records the reconstruction of the bridge by the Kangxi Emperor of the Qing dynasty in 1698. The other stele bears calligraphy by the Qianlong Emperor, a grandson of the Kangxi Emperor. It reads "Morning moon over Lugou" (蘆溝曉月 Lúgōu xiǎoyuè). For the 800 years since its completion, the bridge has been a well known scenic spot in Beijing.

As well as being famed for its aesthetic features, Marco Polo Bridge is also considered to be an architectural masterpiece. It is built of granite, with a large central arch flanked by ten smaller ones. Each of the ten piers is protected by triangular iron pillars that have been installed to prevent damage by flood and ice.

== See also ==
- History of Beijing
- List of bridges in China
