= Nanshan =

Nanshan (Chinese: 南山; pinyin: Nánshān, literally "South[ern] mountain[s]"), is a common place name in China and adjacent areas:

== Geographic locations ==
=== China ===
Topographic features

- Nanshan, another name for the Nanling Mountains of southern China
- Nanshan Mountains (Shenzhen), a group of two mountains in Shenzhen, China
- Nanshan (Shaanxi), another name for the Qinling Mountains of central China from their position south of the Yellow River
- Nanshan (Gansu), another name for the Qilian Mountains of central China from their position south of the Hexi Corridor
- Nanshan (Heilongjiang), a dormant volcanic peak named for its position at the southern end of the Keluo Mountains
- Nanshan (Chongqing), a part of Tongluo Mountain close to downtown Chongqing
- Nanshan (Xinjiang), another name for the Wusun Mountains from their position south of the Ili River
- Battle of Nanshan, fought in 1904 in the southern hills of Jinzhou, Dalian, Liaoning, during the Russo-Japanese War

Districts

- Nanshan District, Shenzhen, in Shenzhen, Guangdong
- Nanshan District, Hegang, in Hegang, Heilongjiang
- Nanshan District, Zhuolu County, county-administered district of Zhuolu County, Hebei

Subdistricts

- Nanshan Subdistrict, Ningguo, Anhui; see List of township-level divisions of Anhui
- Nanshan Subdistrict, Chongqing, in Nan'an District, Chongqing; see Cherry blossom
- Nanshan Subdistrict, Shenzhen, in Nanshan District, Shenzhen
- Nanshan Subdistrict, Jixi, in Jiguan District, Jixi, Heilongjiang; see List of township-level divisions of Heilongjiang
- Nanshan Subdistrict, Shuangyashan, in Lingdong District, Shuangyashan, Heilongjiang; see List of township-level divisions of Heilongjiang
- Nanshan Subdistrict, Beipiao, Beipiao, Liaoning
- Nanshan Subdistrict, Pulandian, Pulandian, Liaoning

Towns

- Nanshan, Changting County, in Changting County, Fujian, see List of township-level divisions of Fujian
- Nanshan, Foshan, in Sanshui District, Foshan, Guangdong, see List of township-level divisions of Guangdong
- Nanshan, Jiexi County, in Jiexi County, Guangdong, see List of township-level divisions of Guangdong
- Nanshan, Nanping, in Yanping District, Nanping, Fujian, see List of township-level divisions of Fujian
- Nanshan, Xuwen County, in Xuwen County, Guangdong, see List of township-level divisions of Guangdong

=== Kazakhstan ===
- Nanshan (Kazakhstan), another name for the Wusun Mountains

=== Philippines ===
- Nanshan Island, eighth-largest Spratly Island

== See also ==
- 南山 (disambiguation), for Chinese, Korean, and Japanese place names and people's names written with these characters
- USS Nanshan (AG-3), collier in the service of the United States Navy
- Namsan (disambiguation), Korean placename with the same spelling in Chinese characters and same meaning as Nanshan
- South Mountain (disambiguation)
- Shannan (disambiguation) containing "山南"
