= Beijing-Miyun Water Diversion Canal =

Water diversion canal in Beijing, China

Jingmi Diversion Canal Beijing-Miyun Water Diversion Canal
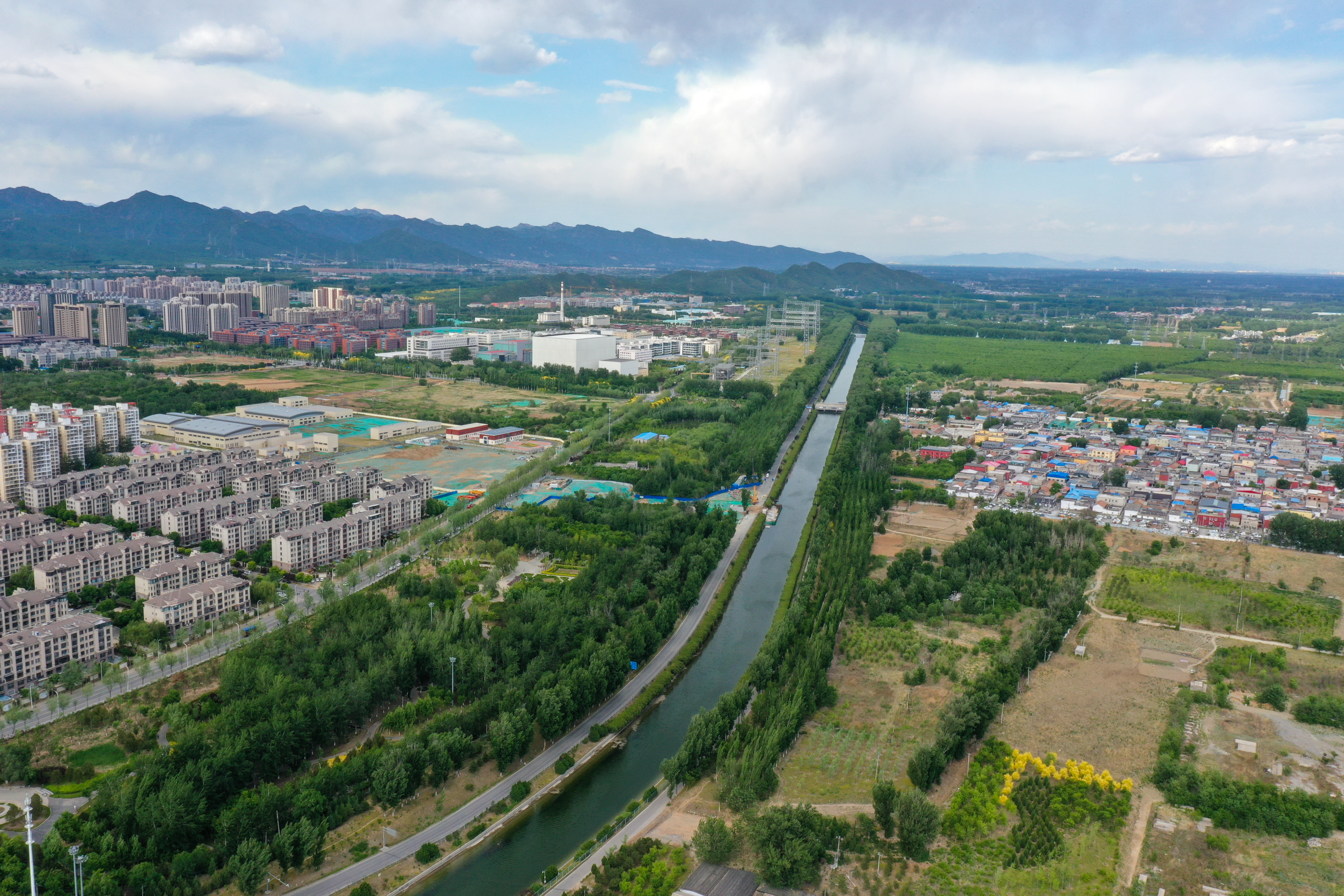
- Jingmi Water Diversion Channel Changping Nanshao Section

- Schematic diagram of Jingmi diversion channel
- Native name: 京密引水渠 (Chinese)

Location
- Country: China
- Provincial administrative region: Beijing

Physical characteristics
- Source: Miyun Reservoir
  - location: Bai River Main Dam

Basin features
- Cities: Beijing

The Beijing-Miyun Water Diversion Canal, abbreviated as Jingmi Diversion Canal, is a water diversion canal located within Beijing, China. It has a total length of 112.7 kilometers. Construction began in 1960, with the first phase completed in 1961 and the second phase finished in 1966. The project's primary goal is to divert water from the Chaobai River, stored in the Miyun Reservoir, into urban areas of Beijing. As the most important water supply route for the city, the Jingmi Diversion Canal is often said to deliver “two out of every three cups of water consumed daily by Beijing residents.”

== Flow through ==
The Jingmi Diversion Canal originates from the main dam of the Bai River at the Miyun Reservoir. It flows through the Huairou Reservoir and Kunming Lake in the Summer Palace, eventually joining the Yongding River Diversion Canal at Binjiao. The section from Kunming Lake to Binjiao, together with the stretch from Binjiao to Yuyuantan of the Yongding River Diversion Channel, is known as the Kunyu River. The Jingmi Diversion Channel passes through five districts of Beijing in sequence: Miyun District, Huairou District, Shunyi District, Changping District, and Haidian District.

== History ==
Construction of the Jingmi Diversion Canal began in 1960, and it started officially supplying fresh water to urban Beijing in 1961. The second phase of excavation began in 1966. In 1989, the channel began supplying fresh water to Beijing during the winter, transforming it from a seasonal water diversion system into a year-round water supply channel. Due to aging infrastructure and continuous overloading, large-scale repairs were carried out on the Jingmi Diversion Channel in 2005. The main work involved reinforcing the canal and removing silt. In 2009, taking advantage of the high water quality of the Guanting Reservoir in autumn, water delivery through the channel was suspended, and a renovation project was completed within 50 days.

== Phase I ==
=== Planning ===
In 1958, the Beijing Municipal Committee ordered the Municipal Design Institute to begin designing a plan to divert water from the Miyun Reservoir into the Beijing-Miyun Canal. Initially, the plan had three main goals: first, to meet Beijing's domestic, industrial and agricultural water needs; second, to provide water for the Beijing-Tianjin Canal; third, to use artificial waterways to provide shipping capacity between Beijing's urban and suburban areas; fourth, to build a hydropower station in the canal and use the water flow to generate electricity; and fifth, to connect scenic spots such as Yuyuantan Park, Kunming Lake, Ming Tombs Reservoir, Miyun Reservoir and Xiaotangshan Hot Spring and use the canal to make these scenic spots form a tourist scenic belt and drive tourism development.

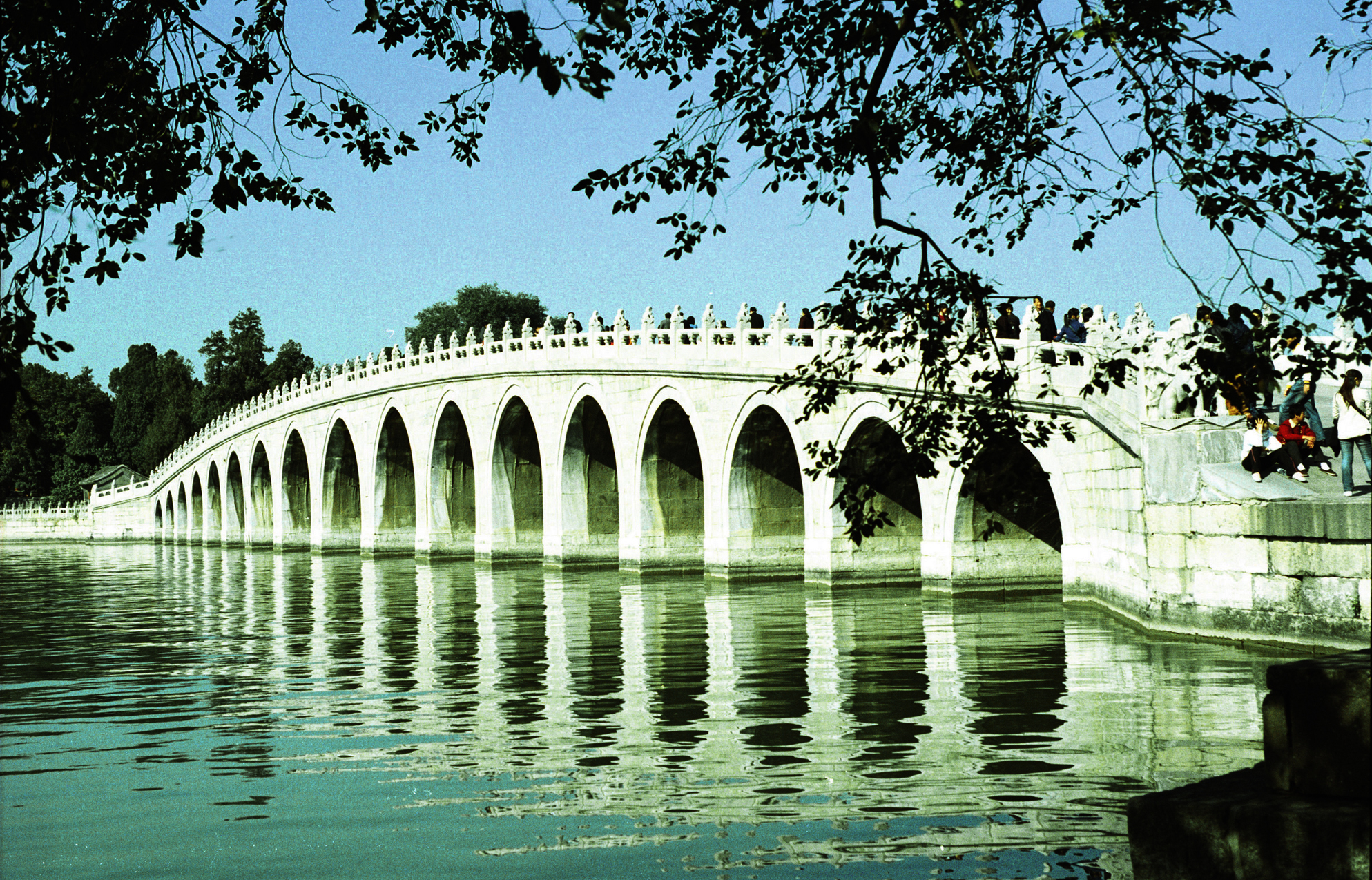
View of Kunming Lake

In the second half of the same year, the Municipal Design Institute began to organize staff to start planning and proposed a plan to the Beijing Municipal Party Committee. This plan was for the canal to start from the Miyun Reservoir Regulating Pool, flow southwest through the Hangezhuang Ship Lock in Miyun District, pass the Huairou Reservoir, reach Xicui Village, and flow through the tributaries of the Wenyu River. After that, it will flow out of Kunming Lake and flow to Luodaozhuang upstream of Yuyuantan Lake. Finally, it will merge with the Yongding River Diversion Channel and flow into the Xibianmen Gate moat. After entering the moat, the canal will be divided into two parts, one of which will flow into the Qiansanmen moat, and the other will flow into the South moat, passing through Longtan Lake to Majuqiao in Tong County and merge with the Beijing-Tianjin Canal which is also under planning. In addition, the designers also planned a tributary, which starts from Xiaoxinfeng in Changping County (now Changping District), flows through Shahe Reservoir, Qinghe, Dongzhimen and flows into the East moat.

To enable navigation, the plan included the construction of a ship lift below the Beibaiyan auxiliary dam of the Miyun Reservoir, allowing cruise ships to enter the reservoir. The section of the canal above Kunming Lake and below Longtan Lake was designated as the suburban navigation section, built to China's national Class III canal standard, allowing the passage of barges up to 1,000 tons or double-deck passenger vessels. The section between Kunming Lake and Longtan Lake was designated as the urban canal section, built to the national Class V standard, capable of accommodating barges up to 500 tons or single-deck passenger vessels. Based on Beijing's water needs at the time—for domestic, industrial, and agricultural use—the canal's designed flow rate was 100 cubic meters per second. The suburban section was planned to be 60 meters wide and 3 meters deep, while the urban section was 40 meters wide and 2.5 meters deep. The total volume of earthwork for the project reached 80 million cubic meters.

=== Design ===
After the plan was approved by the Beijing Municipal Committee, the Municipal Design Institute began designing the water diversion project and appointed then-Deputy Chief Engineer Huang Zhendong as the chief designer. The first phase of the project started from the regulation pond of the Miyun Reservoir at Gongzhuangzi Village and ended at Xicuicun Village in Changping County, with a total length of approximately 53 kilometers.

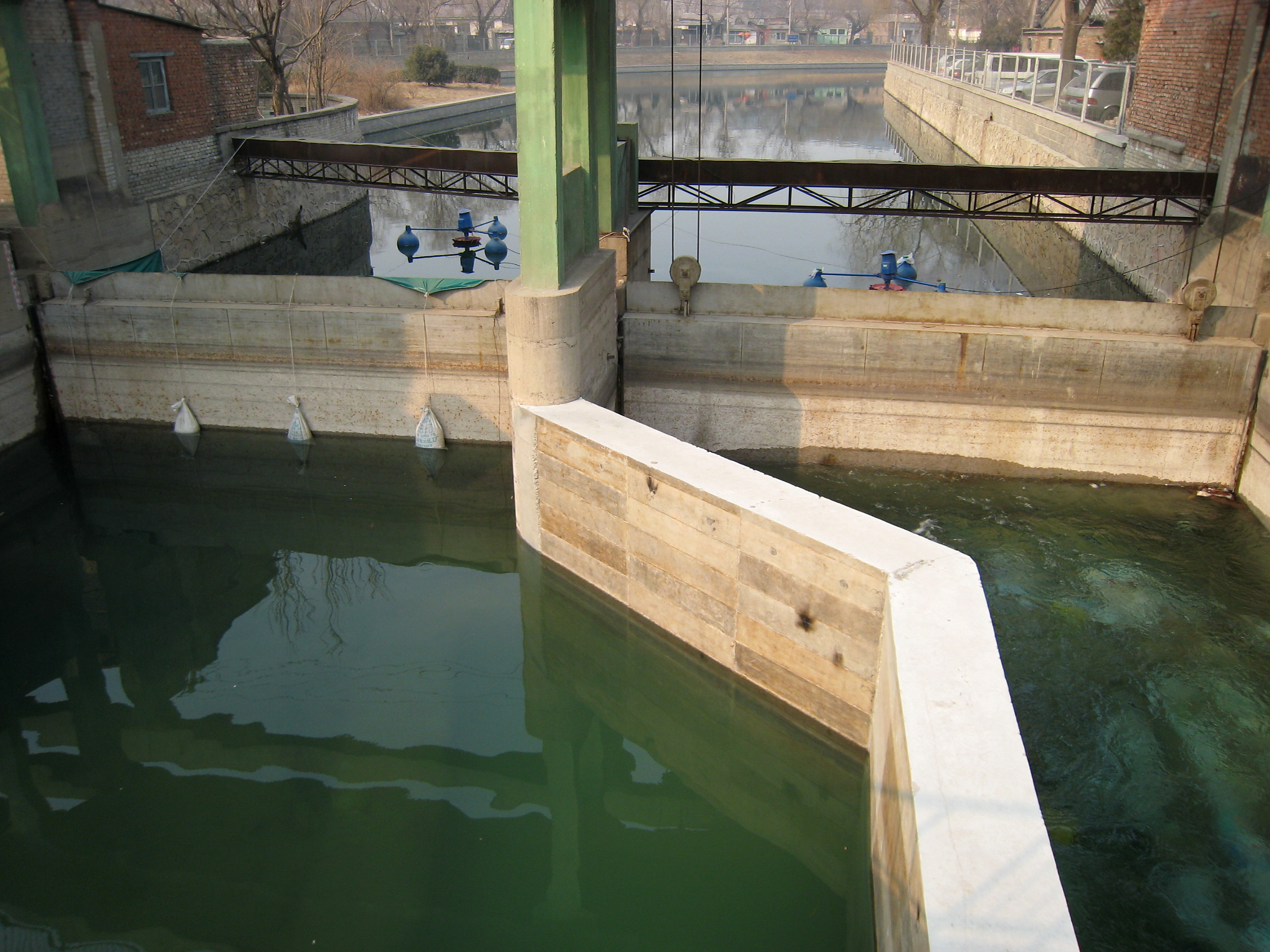
The sluice gate where the Jingmi Canal flows into Kunming Lake is located north of the Summer Palace

The first phase of the design project is divided into four sections. The first section is from Gongzhuangzi Intake Gate to Huairou Reservoir. This section is about 25 kilometers long. The main project is to expand the existing Baihe Irrigation Canal. The design flow is 40 cubic meters per second, the channel bottom width is 8 meters, and the design water depth is 2.84 meters to 2.97 meters. The first 13 kilometers of this section is gravel as the bottom. In order to prevent water leakage, the design uses clay lining. The original design of this section required the water diversion tunnel of Huairou Reservoir, but the design flow of this tunnel was only 20 cubic meters per second, which could not meet the requirements of the Beijing-Miyun Canal. Therefore, the design team decided to open another outlet at Fengshan and build a new channel with a flow of 40 cubic meters per second. The second section starts from Xitaixia and ends at Lishishan Control Gate. It also uses the existing Baihe Irrigation Canal with the help of expansion. The design channel bottom width of this section is 10 meters, the design flow is 60 cubic meters per second, and the water depth is 3.1 meters. The third section starts from Lishishan and ends at the culvert of Xicui Village. It is 21.2 kilometers long, with a designed channel bottom width of 20 meters, a water depth of 3 meters, and a designed flow rate of 30 cubic meters per second. The fourth section starts from Xicui Village and ends at Dongbianmen. It is designed to be 37 kilometers long, with a channel bottom width of 20 meters and a flow rate of 30 cubic meters per second, but it was not constructed in the first phase of the project.

The head of the Beijing-Miyun Water Diversion Canal was located at Gongzhuangzi Village, 5 km downstream of the Baihe River main dam of the Miyun Reservoir. The head of the canal was designed with a regulating pond dam and a flood discharge gate. In addition, it was also equipped with a diversion canal water inlet gate, a ship lock and a hydropower station. The dam and flood discharge gate had already been built during the construction of the Miyun Reservoir, while the ship lock and the hydropower station were reserved and would not be built in the first phase of the project. Therefore, only the diversion canal water inlet gate remained to be built in the first phase of the project. This water inlet gate is a two-hole type with a 2.5m × 4.0m flat steel gate. The total height from the bottom of the gate is 86 meters. The design flow rate can reach 40 cubic meters per second, which was later changed to 50 cubic meters per second. A capacity of 100 cubic meters per second was reserved to prevent accidents.

In the design plan, the designers designed a water outlet gate at Fengshankou and a control gate at Lishishan, and planned to expand the water inlet gate of Huairou Reservoir. The design flow of Fengshankou water outlet gate is 40 cubic meters per second. After completion, it can allow ships with a maximum weight of 100 tons to enter Huairou Reservoir. The bottom elevation of the gate is 54.5 meters, the top elevation of the gate is 63.0 meters, the length of the gate chamber is 20 meters, the navigation water level is 59.2 meters, and the navigation clearance is 3.8 meters. The design flow of Lishishan control gate is 20 cubic meters per second. This gate serves as a water diversion gate. After the expansion, the water inlet gate of Huairou Reservoir will be upgraded from a two-hole type to a four-hole type, and will have a 2.3m×3.0m flat steel gate. In order to prevent flood accidents, two flood discharge gates were designed at Yanqi Lake and Taoyukou. The Yanqi Lake Flood Discharge Gate is located 1 km below the Beitaishang Reservoir Dam. The Beijing-Miyun Water Diversion Channel intersects with the mountain torrent ditch at this point, so a flood discharge gate was designed to be set up on the left bank of the channel. This flood discharge gate has two holes, a hole width of 6 meters, a gate bottom elevation of 57.0 meters, a 6m×5m arc-shaped steel gate, and a design flow of 155 cubic meters per second, which was changed to 231 cubic meters per second after calibration. The Taoyukou Flood Discharge Gate is designed as a 3-hole type, with a hole width of 6 meters, a gate bottom elevation of 47.82 meters, a 6m×5m arc-shaped steel gate, and a design flow of 239 cubic meters per second, which was changed to 388 cubic meters per second after calibration.

To allow certain sections of the Beijing-Miyun water diversion channel to pass beneath roads or riverbeds, the design plan included the construction of an inverted siphon. This siphon, known as the Shahe Inverted Siphon, is located 12.3 kilometers downstream from the Gongzhuangzi Intake Gate, and is named after the town of Shahe where it is situated. The siphon features a twin-barrel structure made of reinforced concrete, with each barrel measuring 3 meters by 3 meters. It has a total length of 131 meters and is designed for a flow rate of 40 cubic meters per second, with a flow velocity of 2.5 meters per second.Due to significant elevation differences along the canal route, the design team incorporated six drop structures (check dams) along the 9-kilometer section between the Gongzhuangzi Intake Gate and the Shahe Inverted Siphon. Each drop structure features a two-bay gate, 3 meters wide, with vertical drops ranging from 2.25 to 5.65 meters. Some of the larger drop structures were designed with space reserved for future hydropower stations.According to the design, wherever the canal passed through gullies with high sediment content or mountain streams with drainage areas between 10 and 50 square kilometers, culverts were constructed. In total, 25 culverts were designed along the entire Jingmi Diversion Channel. These culverts range from four-barrel to eight-barrel designs, and during dry periods, they can also accommodate vehicle traffic.To prevent overtopping and potential embankment failure caused by excessively high water levels, the designers included a side spillway 2 kilometers upstream from the Huairou Reservoir Intake Gate. Located on the left bank of the canal, the spillway has a canal bed elevation of 56.95 meters and a crest elevation of 59.65 meters. It is equipped with 13 sluice gates, each measuring 1.5 meters by 1.2 meters, using stacked beam gates.

=== Construction ===
On October 14, 1960, the Beijing Municipal Committee held a meeting on the preparatory work for the Jingmi Diversion Project, presided over by then Deputy Mayor Feng Jiping. The meeting decided to establish the “General Command for the Construction of the Jingmi Project” and appointed the former commander-in-chief of the Miyun Reservoir construction project as the commander-in-chief of the Jingmi Diversion Channel project. The project was divided into four sections for separate construction, with sub-command centers set up in Miyun District, Huairou County, Changping County, and Chaoyang District.As 1960 fell within the period of China's "Three Years of Difficulties", the command center decided not to mobilize farmers for this project. Instead, around 50,000 workers were drawn from urban infrastructure, hydropower, and commercial sectors to participate in the construction. Additionally, 5,000 personnel were transferred from government agencies and schools, along with the recruitment of some rural laborers to support the work. These workers began arriving at the construction sites in late October and officially began work in early November. Most of the labor force was assigned to the upper section, upstream of Xicuicun, while only a few structures were built in the section downstream of Xicuicun. In April 1961, the upper section of the canal was officially completed.

In March 1961, the water level in the Guanting Reservoir exceeded government expectations, temporarily easing Beijing's overall water shortage. Considering that construction workers had been working continuously for five months, the Beijing Municipal Committee decided to halt all canal construction downstream of Xicuicun. The section upstream of Xicuicun was designated as the first phase of the Jingmi Diversion Project. This phase lasted five months, involved the excavation and movement of 6.32 million cubic meters of earth and rock, the construction of 94 structures, and a total expenditure of 35.9 million RMB.

After the first phase of the canal began operation, the Municipal Design Institute identified severe seepage issues along several sections: between Gongzhuangzi and Shahe, between the canal and the Yanqi River, and near Liugezhuang. Additionally, the canal bank near Liugezhuang was found to be unstable, and the section from Huairou Reservoir to Lishishan failed to reach the designed flow rate, falling short of water transport requirements. As a result, in September 1963, the institute submitted the Preliminary Design for the Continuation of the First Phase of the Jingmi Diversion Project, and in December of the same year, an Expanded Preliminary Design was proposed. With approval from higher authorities, repairs were carried out in 1964, including the permanent abandonment of several culverts blocked by silt, the reconstruction of the Shou inverted siphon, and the construction of a new control gate at Fanggezhuang.

== Phase II ==
=== Planning ===
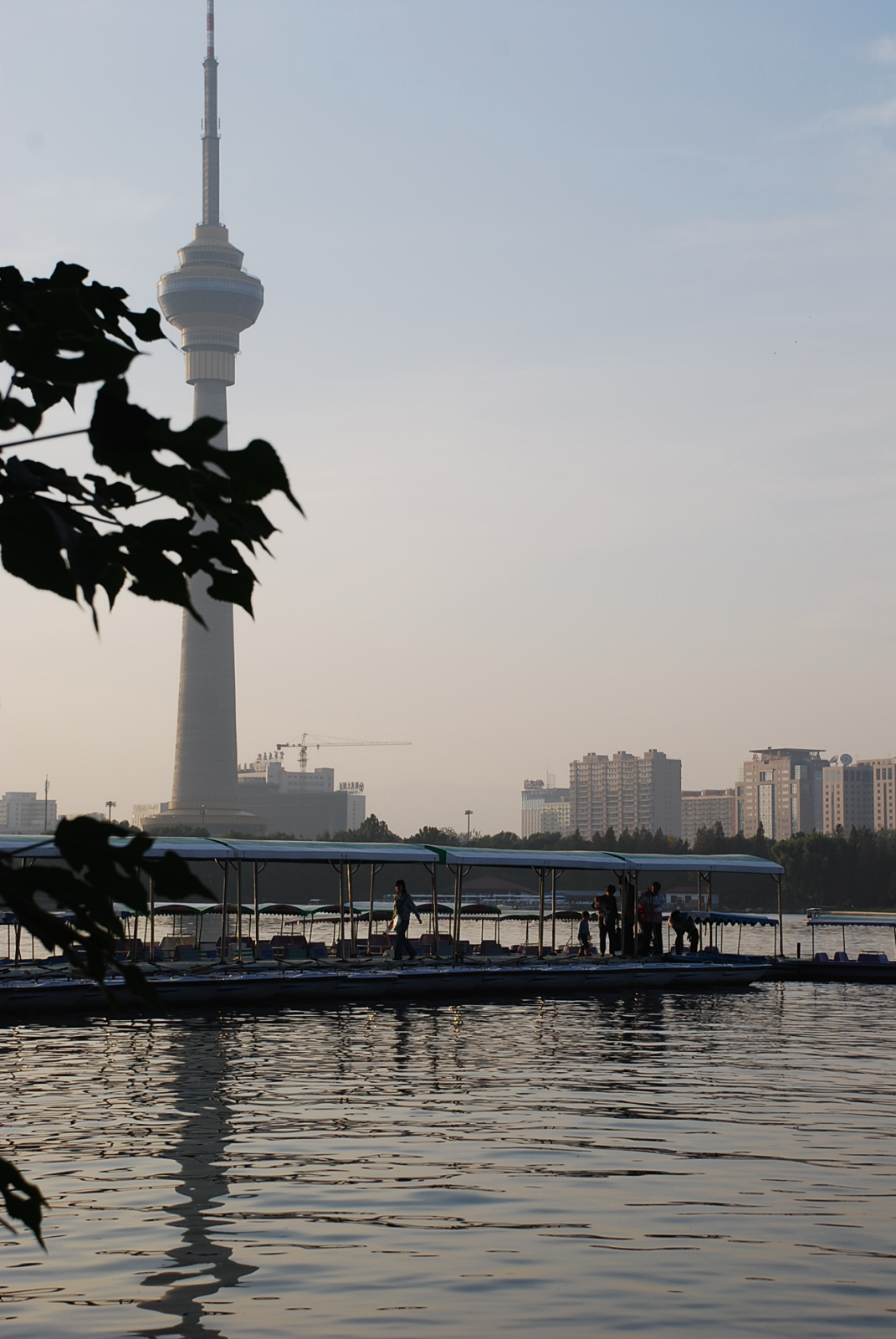
The lake view of Yuyuantan Park

After the construction of the first phase of the Beijing-Miyun Canal was suspended, the Municipal Design Institute began to conduct in-depth research and investigation on the unfinished project, focusing on the east and west tributaries below Xicui Village. During the investigation, the Municipal Design Institute commissioned the Beijing Hydrogeological Team to conduct geological surveys around the original canal route. After the survey, the Hydrogeological Team submitted a "Geological Survey Report" and a "Geological Report and Attached Figures for the Initial Design Phase". Liu Ren, then the second secretary of the Beijing Municipal Party Committee, Wan Li, then the deputy mayor of Beijing, and Feng Jiping studied these reports. In the summer of 1963, the municipal government held a seminar to study whether to choose the east branch or the west branch. After the seminar, the government decided to choose the west branch. The reason was that although the west line was 9 kilometers longer than the east line and was not as easy to dig as the east line, it could pass through Changping and Haidian, which were still rural areas at the time, which was beneficial to agricultural irrigation; the west line could divert water into Kunming Lake, which was also beneficial to the agricultural development of the western suburbs of Beijing.

In 1965, North China suffered a severe drought. Beijing's annual rainfall was only 377 mm that year, and the water storage capacity of Guanting Reservoir, the main water supply source at the time, was greatly reduced. By September 1965, Guanting Reservoir had only 265 million cubic meters of water resources. Since the end of the "Three Years of Difficulties", Beijing's industry and agriculture had developed to a certain extent, and water consumption increased sharply, and the contradiction between supply and demand began to emerge. For this reason, the Beijing Municipal Party Committee reported to the State Council of China, requesting approval for the implementation of the Beijing-Miyun Water Diversion Canal Phase II Project. The Beijing Municipal Party Committee submitted the "Plan and Task Book for the Beijing-Miyun Water Diversion Phase II Project" and the "Preliminary Design of the Beijing-Miyun Water Diversion Phase II Project" to the State Council, with a budget of 30 million yuan. After the State Council received the report, Zhou Enlai, then Chinese Premier, approved the Beijing Municipal Party Committee's request, but required that the quality be guaranteed, the project be completed on schedule, and the budget not exceed 30 million yuan.

=== Design ===
The design of the canal for the second phase of the project was similar to that of the first phase, but some minor adjustments were made based on the situation at the time. The original plan was to build a 600-meter-long canal at Xiaoxin Peak, but in order to avoid the impact on local residents after the water was delivered, it was changed to pass through the foot of the mountain. The river channel in Nanxin Village was originally planned to pass through the entire village, but in order to avoid leakage causing house collapse, the new plan moved the canal to the east. The bottom width of this section was designed to be 20 meters, and the maximum water depth of each section was between 2.4 meters and 2.8 meters. In order to prevent rainwater from eroding the canal, new drainage ditches and water collection wells were designed. The soil near the designed canal route is mostly sandy clay, which requires lining work, but due to budget constraints, the design plan only partially lined the gravel and fine sand sections.

=== Construction ===
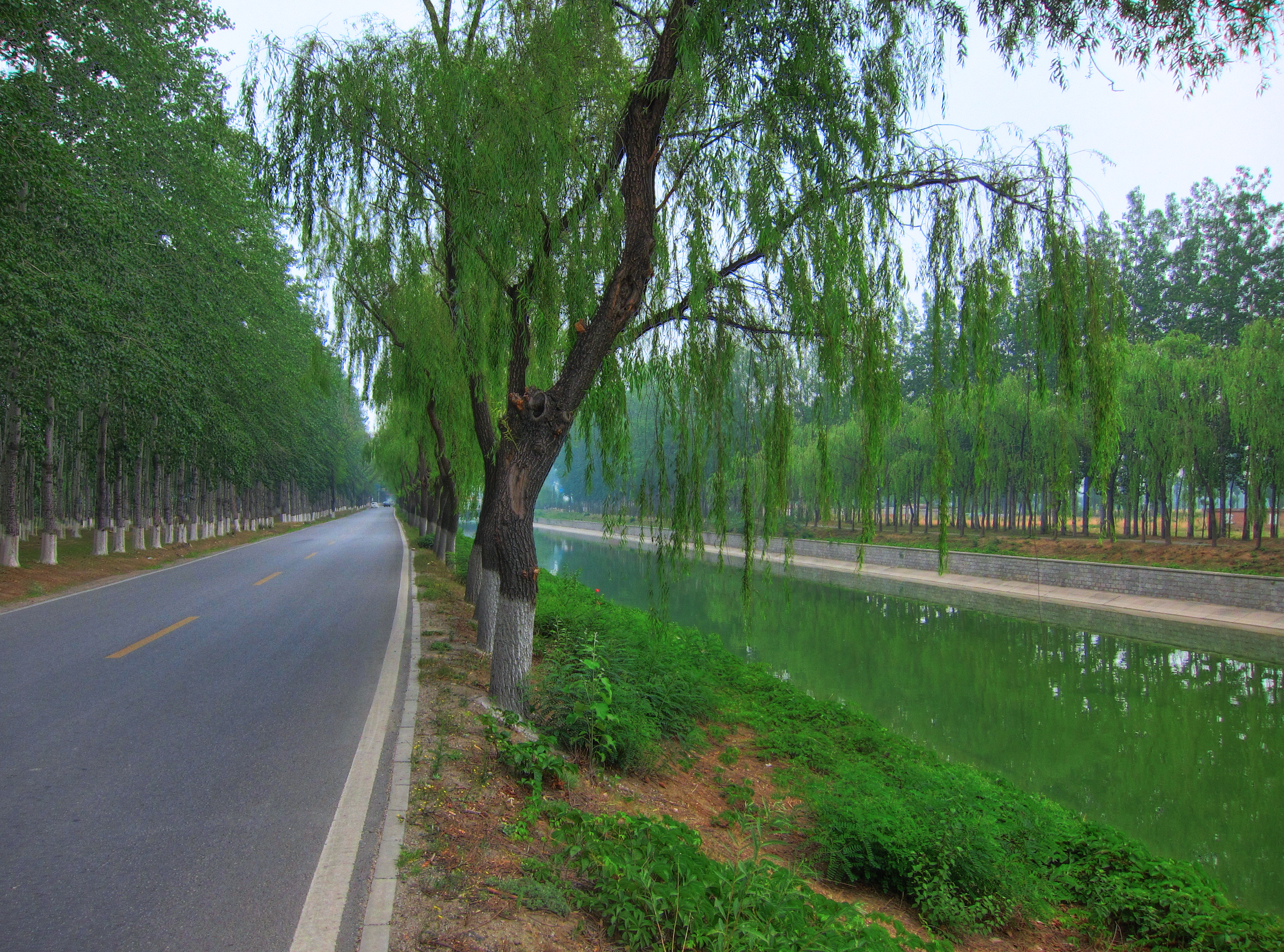
The Shunyi to Huairou section of the Beijing-Miyun Canal.

In September 1965, the General Command of the Beijing-Miyun Water Diversion Project was re-established, with its headquarters in Yangfang Village, Changping County (now Yangfang Town, Changping District). Zhao Fan, secretary of the Beijing Municipal Committee of the Chinese Communist Party and deputy mayor, served as the general commander, Huang Zhendong, deputy chief engineer of the Municipal Design Institute, served as the chief design engineer, and Gao Zhenkui, chief engineer of the Water Conservancy Bureau, served as the chief construction engineer. In addition to the construction of a new channel from Xicui Village to Kunming Lake, the second phase of the project also included maintenance and improvement work on the channel built in the original first phase of the project. The general command consists of two sub-commands in the south section and the north section; after the construction of the Kunming Lake to Yuyuantan section started, a new Kunyu section sub-command was established. The second phase of the project officially started on October 10, 1965. Participants in the construction were 60,000 migrant workers in Beijing, officers and soldiers of the Chinese People's Liberation Army who participated in voluntary labor, employees of central and Beijing government agencies, and teachers and students of Beijing colleges and universities. In mid-November 1965, the construction of the Kunyu section officially started. The main earthwork was carried out by 3,000 soldiers and 5,000 staff members of the People's Liberation Army stationed in Beijing. The sluice gates and other buildings along the water diversion channel were constructed by migrant workers. In April 1966, the Beijing-Miyun water diversion channel was basically completed and a water test was carried out. In May of the same year, the water diversion channel was officially declared completed. A total of 9.26 million cubic meters of earthwork and 299 buildings were completed, which took 6 million man-days and a total investment of 29.8 million yuan . In October 1965, the maintenance and improvement work of the first phase of the project officially began. This improvement project increased the water transfer capacity from Huairou Reservoir to Lishishan from 40 cubic meters per second to 60 cubic meters per second, and from Lishishan to Xicui Village from 20 cubic meters per second to 40 cubic meters per second. A drainage system and a road along the channel were built along the channel. In addition, the second phase of the project also built two highway bridges on the canal constructed in the first phase to help vehicles cross the canal. This repair project completed 1.37 million cubic meters of earth and stone, built 69 new buildings, and required a total of 1.23 million man-days of work .

== Water from the South-to-North Water Diversion Project is transferred back to Miyun Reservoir ==
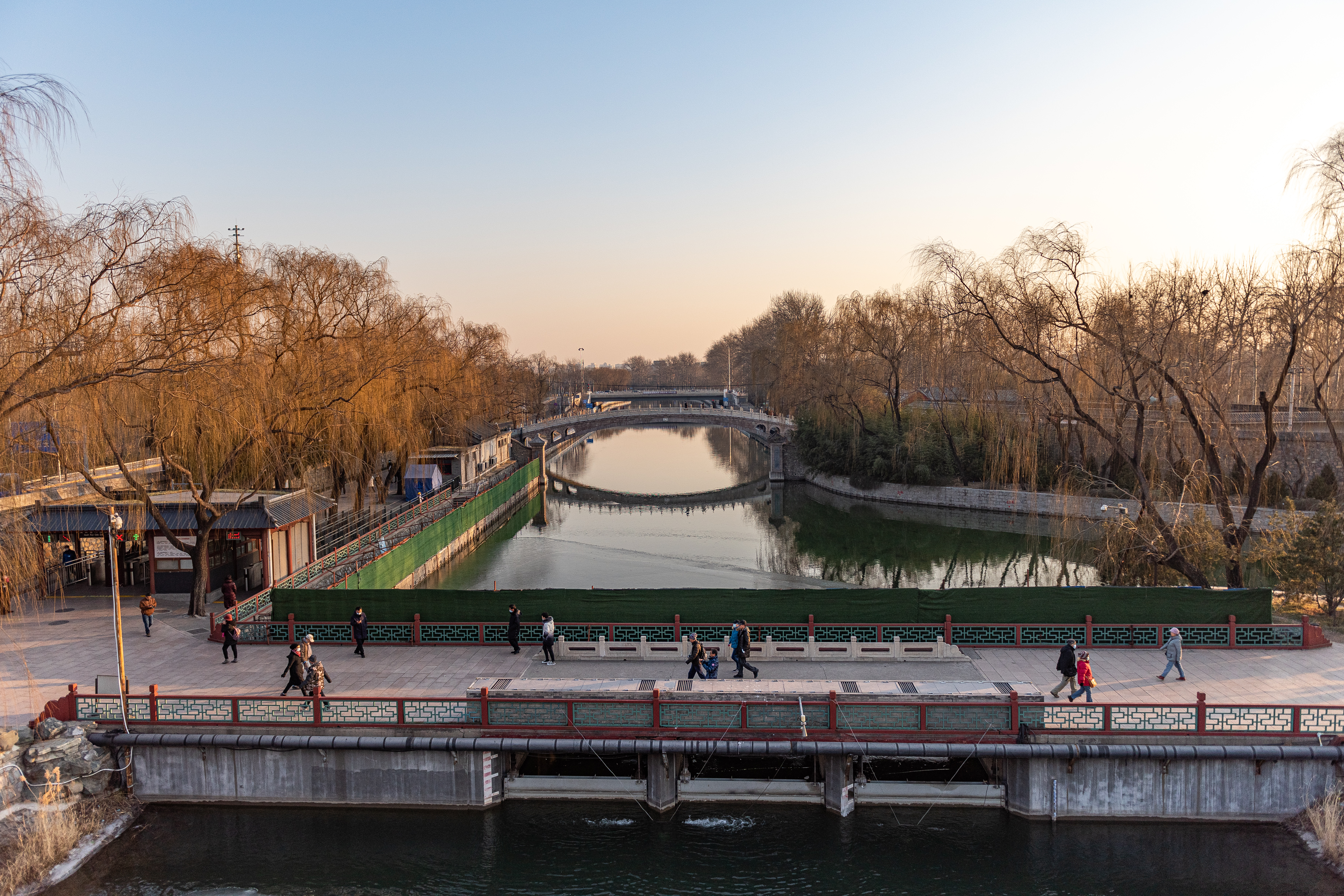
The section of the Jingmi Canal south of Xiuyi Bridge at the Ruyi Gate in the south of the Summer Palace

In the planning of the South-to-North Water Diversion Project, it was originally planned to build the Zhangfang Reservoir on the Juma River in Fangshan as an online regulating reservoir for the water from the South-to-North Water Diversion Project to carry out inter-annual regulation; at the same time, it was also planned to use groundwater recharge for regulation. However, the construction cost of the Zhangfang Reservoir was huge, and it would need to flood the Shidu Scenic Area, making construction difficult; if only groundwater was used for regulation, it would be restricted due to the limited groundwater extraction capacity. Therefore, the plan chose to transfer the water from the South-to-North Water Diversion Project to the Miyun Reservoir and canceled the construction of the Zhangfang Reservoir.

The South-to-North Water Diversion Project (hereinafter referred to as the Miyun Reservoir Regulation Project) draws water from the Tuancheng Lake Regulating Pool and utilizes most of the channels of the Beijing-Miyun Water Diversion Channel. Six pumping stations are built along the Beijing-Miyun Water Diversion Channel at Tundian, Liulin, Tantou, Xingshou, Lishishan and Xitai to divert water to the Huairou Reservoir. After the Guojiawu and Yanqi pumping stations are built upstream of the Huairou Reservoir, water is transferred to the Miyun Reservoir through a newly built PCCP pipeline with an inner diameter of 2,600 mm. The pipeline is then transported through the Xiwengzhuang pumping station. The total length of the line is 103 km, of which 22 km is a newly built pipeline and the rest uses the existing channels of the Beijing-Miyun Water Diversion Channel. The total head is 149.3 meters. The maximum designed flow rate from Tuancheng Lake to Huairou Reservoir is 20 cubic meters per second, while that from Huairou Reservoir to Miyun Reservoir is 10 cubic meters per second . In the initial stage of water diversion, the remaining water from other provinces and cities along the middle route will be transferred to the Miyun Reservoir to increase the water volume of the Miyun Reservoir; in the long term, the regulation and storage function will be realized to allocate water from the South-to-North Water Diversion Project .

The project started construction in 2013. In December 2014, the middle route of the South-to-North Water Diversion Project was put into operation, and the Miyun Reservoir Regulation Project entered the trial operation stage in May 2015.

== Notable bridges ==
- Changchun Bridge in Haidian, Beijing, located near the Changchun Qiao subway station on Lines 10 and 12

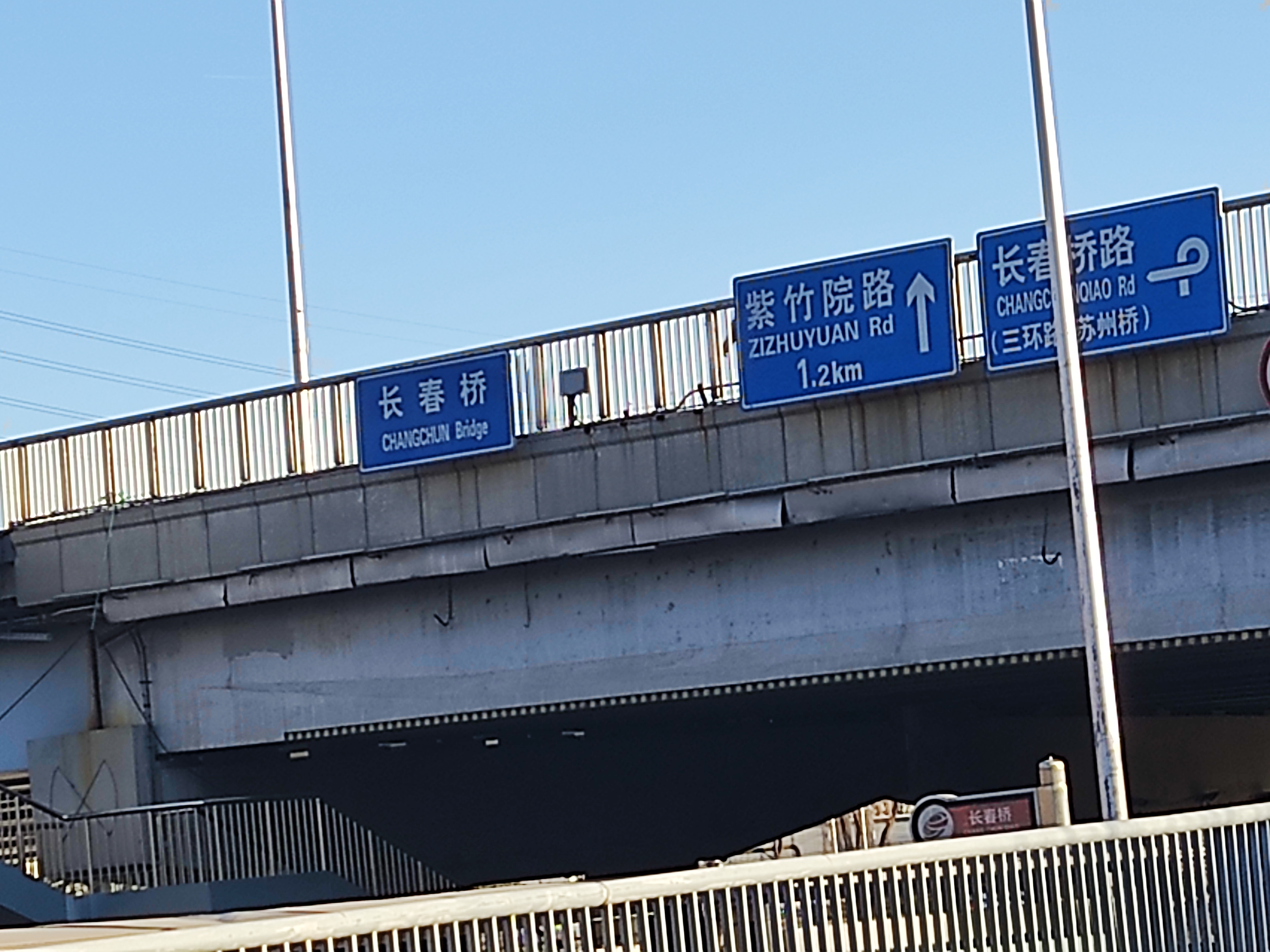
Changchun Bridge on Jingmi Diversion Canal.

== Environmental conditions ==
=== Freezing damage ===
During the second phase of the Beijing-Miyun Canal project and its improvement, concrete slabs, stone slabs, clay, plastic film and other materials were used to line the gravel and sandy soil canal for anti-seepage work. The total length of the project was about 33 kilometers. After the Beijing-Miyun Canal was put into operation, this lining and anti-seepage project played a certain role in reducing water resource infiltration losses. However, it also caused the soil in this area to be not permeable and the water in the soil was not easy to drain out. Therefore, when winter came, the water in the soil would freeze, causing the concrete slabs on both sides of the canal to collapse, crack, and slide. According to a survey conducted from 1974 to 1975, the river sections that had undergone lining and anti-seepage work all experienced severe frost heave, and most of the concrete slabs laid on both sides were damaged due to the freezing of the ground.

From December 1989 to March 1990, after the Beijing-Miyun Canal began to deliver water in winter, the lining section of the Kunyu section suffered "freezing damage" due to the soil freezing and swelling, causing about 30% of the canal to be damaged. From May 26 to June 28, 1990, the engineering team learned from the experience of the Shandong Yellow River to Jiqing Project and used polystyrene as an anti-seepage material to solve the problem of freezing damage.

=== Garbage pollution ===
Although the Beijing-Miyun Canal is the primary freshwater transportation route in Beijing, it has been polluted to varying degrees. Some white garbage and domestic garbage have polluted the freshwater in the canal and blocked the canal, reducing the canal's transportation capacity. The Beijing-Miyun Canal Management Office cleans up the garbage on the water surface every day and adds protective nets in certain sections of the river to prevent garbage from flowing downstream . The Changping District Environmental Protection Bureau has installed water quality monitoring equipment in the downstream section of the canal and conducts random water quality checks from time to time to ensure that the freshwater in the canal is of qualified quality .

=== Destruction and protection of river channels ===
In the decades since the completion of the Beijing-Miyun Water Diversion Canal until 2005, people have never carried out large-scale maintenance on the Beijing-Miyun Water Diversion Canal, which has led to its aging and disrepair, serious channel erosion, unstable channel slope, a large amount of silt deposited at the bottom of the canal, and a lot of aquatic plants growing, which greatly affected the water delivery capacity. Since 2005, the water delivery capacity of the Beijing-Miyun Water Diversion Canal has been reduced from 40 cubic meters per second to 11 cubic meters per second. Around 2007, it was even forced to stop delivering water to the urban area of Beijing. The government once sent armed police officers and soldiers to the canal to remove aquatic plants, raised fish that specialize in eating aquatic plants in the canal, and organized a fleet to salvage aquatic plants, but it still could not prevent the further aging of the canal, causing it to waste a lot of water resources. According to statistics, from 1990 to 1999, the natural evaporation of the Beijing-Miyun Water Diversion Canal was as high as 23%, and the evaporation in 1999 reached 32.7%, which made the water resources of the Miyun Reservoir not well preserved on the way to the urban area of Beijing. In 2005, the government decided to carry out a large-scale repair of the Beijing-Miyun Canal, which included clearing the silt from the canal and hardening the canal bottom. According to statistics, as a result of this repair, the Beijing-Miyun Canal can save 100 million cubic meters of fresh water each year, and the fresh water transported to Beijing city has reached at least China's second-level water quality standards.
