= Nanzan (disambiguation) =

Nanzan (南山) was one of three independent political entities which controlled the island of Okinawa in the 14th century.

Nanzan may also refer to:

- Nanzan Castle, ruins of a Ryūkyūan gusuku in Itoman, Okinawa
- Nanzan Institute for Religion and Culture, a center for scholarly research on the interface of philosophy and religions within the East and West
- Nanzan University in Nagoya, Japan
- M6A1-K Nanzan, a variant of the Aichi M6A, a WWII submarine-launched attack floatplane designed for the Imperial Japanese Navy

== See also ==
- Minamiyama, a variant pronunciation of the characters (南山)
- 南山 (disambiguation)
- 山南 (disambiguation)
