= 南 =

南 may refer to:

- Nan (surname), Chinese surname
- Nam (Korean surname)
- Minami (name), Japanese feminine given name

== See also ==
- Nam-gu (disambiguation), various districts in South Korea
- 南山 (disambiguation) ("south mountain")
- 南海 (disambiguation) ("south sea")
