= Nanshan District, Zhuolu County =

Nanshan
- County-controlled district
- Interactive map of Nanshan
- Coordinates: 39°53′08″N 115°17′32″E
- Country: People's Republic of China
- Province: Hebei
- Prefecture-level city: Zhangjiakou
- County: Zhuolu County
- Time zone: UTC+8 (China Standard Time)

Nanshan is a county-controlled district in the province of Hebei, China. It is under the administration of Zhuolu County, Zhangjiakou. Following the abolition of Küybag District in Poskam County, Kashgar Prefecture in 2026, Nanshan is the only remaining county-controlled district in China. Nanshan includes Hedong Town, Mangshikou Township, Dahenan Town, and Xiejiabu Township.
