= Jingyi Park =

Park in Beijing, China

- Type: Urban park, Forest park
- Location: Beijing, China
- Area: 32 hectares (79 acres)
- Created: 2010
- Owner: Fengtai District, Beijing
- Status: Open all year

Jingyi Park (经仪公园) is a major suburban public city park in southwestern Beijing. It is located in Dawayao of Fengtai District, and is close to Yongding River and Marco Polo Bridge. The park is 32 hectares in size, and open to public all year round since 2010. It provides visitors natural scenic areas and forest traveling experiences, and it is also an important place for environmental study and protection.
