= Shanny =

Shanny or Shannie may refer to:

== Fish ==
- Prickleback, a family (Stichaeidae) of blennies
- Lipophrys pholis, a species of Combtooth blennies

== People ==
- Shannie Barnett (1919–1991), American basketball player
- Shannie Duff, Canadian politician
- Brendan Shanahan (born 1969), Canadian National Hockey League player and executive
- Mike Shanahan (born 1952), National Football League coach

== See also ==
- Shannon (disambiguation)
