= Guanting Hydropower Station =

Guanting Hydropower Station 官厅水电站
- Country: China
- Location: on the upper reaches of the Yongding River
- Purpose: Power
- Construction began: April 1954

Guanting Hydropower Station (Chinese: 官厅水电站), also spelled Guanting Hydropower Plant, is the first automatic power station designed and built by China, located on the upper reaches of the Yongding River in the western suburbs of Beijing. The source of power for the hydropower station is Guanting Reservoir, which generates electricity equivalent to more than 100,000 tons of coal per year.

== History ==
Guanting Hydropower Station started construction in April 1954. On December 27, 1955, it was completed to generate electricity.

On December 26, 1955, Peng Zhen cut the ribbon for the commissioning of the first unit of the Guanting Hydropower Station. He pointed out that, "Guanting Hydropower Station not only generates electricity, but also trains and transports cadres".

Guanting Hydropower Station has 3 units. On December 27, 1955, its first unit generated electricity. In May 1956, the second and third units were put into operation, with a total installed capacity of 30,000 kilowatts, accounting for 14.2% of the installed capacity of the Beijing-Tianjin-Tangshan power grid at that time.
