= 南野 =

南野, meaning “south plain”, is a Japanese lemma, may refer to:

- Minamino, Japanese place name and surname
- Nōno (disambiguation), Japanese surname, notable person is Chieko Nōno, Japanese politician
