= Sanggan River =

River in the People's Republic of China

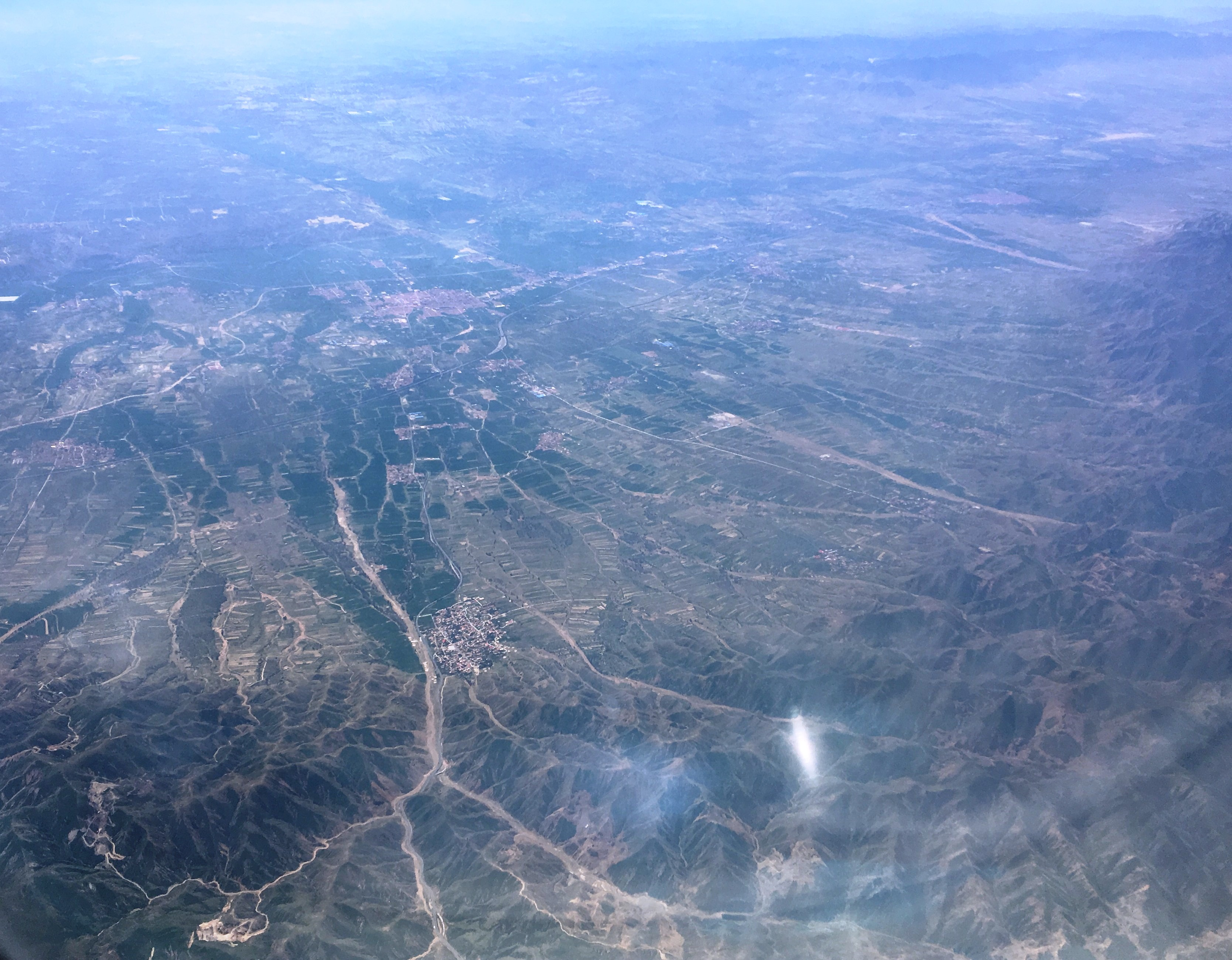
- Sanggan River Valley
- Native name: 桑干河

Location
- Country: China
- Provinces: Shanxi, Hebei, Beijing
- Cities: Xinzhou, Shuozhou, Datong, Zhangjiakou, Yanqing

Physical characteristics
- Source: Hui River and Yuanzi River
  - location: Guancen Mountain of Ningwu County, Shanxi Province
  - coordinates: 38°44′N 111°56′E
- Mouth: Guanting Reservoir
  - location: Between Hebei and Beijing
- Length: 506 km (314 mi)
- Basin size: 23,900 km^{2} (9,200 sq mi)
- Discharge
  - average: 7.5 m^{3}/s (260 cu ft/s)

Basin features
- River system: Hai River

The Sanggan River or Sanggan He (Chinese: 桑干河), also known in English as Sangkan River, is a river in northern China. It runs 506 kilometers and has a drainage area of 23,900 square kilometers. In addition to its significance in hydrology, it is culturally significant as it has been mentioned in various poems, essays, and novels, including a poem by Chen Tao and a novel The Sun Shines Over Sanggan River by Ding Ling. It is also one of the rivers that gave birth to early civilizations.

== Geology ==
The Sangan River is a part of the drainage system of Hai River. It originates in Shanxi Province. It merges with the Yang He (洋河) in Hebei Province and then flows into the Guanting Reservoir. The outflow of the reservoir is known as the Yongding River (formerly known as the Wuding River).

== See also ==
- Ding Ling
- Shanxi
- Zhuolu County
