= Shannon Township =

Shannon Township may refer to the following places:

In Canada

- Shannon Township, Cochrane District, Ontario (geographic / historical)

In the United States

- Shannon Township, Atchison County, Kansas
- Shannon Township, Pottawatomie County, Kansas
- Shannon Township, Robeson County, North Carolina
- Shannon Township, Creek County, Oklahoma
- Shannon Township, Wagoner County, Oklahoma

See also

- Cherry Grove-Shannon Township, Carroll County, Illinois
- Shannon (disambiguation)
