= Minami =

Minami (kanji 南, hiragana みなみ) is a Japanese word meaning "south".

== Places ==
=== Japan ===
There are several Minami wards in Japan, most of them appropriately in the south part of a city:

- Minami, Tokushima, a village in Tokushima Prefecture
- Minami-ku, Sapporo
- Minami-ku, Niigata
- Minami-ku, Saitama
- Minami-ku, Yokohama
- Minami-ku, Sagamihara
- Minami-ku, Hamamatsu
- Minami-ku, Nagoya
- Minami-ku, Kyoto
- Minami-ku, Sakai
- Minami-ku, Okayama
- Minami-ku, Hiroshima
- Minami-ku, Fukuoka
- Minami ward of Osaka merged with Higashi ward and is now part of Chūō ward.

== Other uses ==
- Minami (name)

== See also ==
Other directions:

- Nishi (West)
- Higashi (disambiguation) (East)
- Kita (disambiguation) (North)
