= Shannon (given name) =

- Pronunciation: /ˈʃænən/ SHAN-ən
- Gender: Female (Ireland); Unisex (America, Australia)
- Language: Irish

Origin
- Meaning: "wise river"
- Region of origin: Ireland

Other names
- Alternative spelling: Sionainn, Siannon, Shannen, Shanon, Shannan, Shano
- Variant forms: Shan, Shana, Shanna
- Nicknames: Shan, Non
- Derived: Sionainn

Shannon is an Irish name, Anglicised from Sionainn. Alternative spellings include Shannen, Shanon, Shannan, and Siannon. The variant Shanna is an Anglicisation of Sionna.

Sionainn derives from the Irish name Abha na tSionainn for the River Shannon. Because the suffix ain indicates a diminutive in Irish, the name is sometimes mistranslated as 'little wise one', but means 'possessor of wisdom'.

Some derive the denomination of Shannon (Irish: Sionnain) from the phrase sean-amhan or "old river." Another reported derivation is from Ó Seanaigh, "descendant of Seanach", which yielded the surnames Shanahan and Shannon.

== Namesake ==
The name Sionainn alludes to Sionna, a goddess in Irish mythology whose name means 'possessor of wisdom'. She is the namesake and matron of Sionainn, the River Shannon. The Shannon is the longest river in Ireland and in the British Isles.

Sionainn is one of seven rivers of knowledge said to flow from Connla's Well, the well of wisdom in the Celtic Otherworld (the realm of the dead). Legends vary about the creation of the river, but they all recount the drowning of the Sionna, granddaughter of the great sea god Lir, usually at an undersea well.

According to the legend, nine sacred hazel (or, by some accounts, rowan) trees grow near the well, and drop their bright red fruit in it and on the ground. In the well live the Salmon of Knowledge, whose wisdom comes from eating this fruit. By eating the fruit or one of the salmon, one can share in this wisdom.

== Shortened forms ==
Shana and Shanna are familiar diminutives or forms of Shannon or Sionna.

== Popularity ==
In the United States, the name first appeared on the Social Security Administration's list in 1881 for males. During the 1970s, American parents began to confer the name on boys and girls alike. It was during this time that the name's popularity peaked in the United States. In the 1990 United States Census, Shannon was the 317th most common name for American males.

== Women ==
- Shannon (American singer) (born 1958), American singer
- Shannon (South Korean singer) (born 1998), South Korean singer
- Shannon Applegate, American historian
- Shannon Ashlyn (born 1986), Australian actress
- Shannon Aubert (born 1995), French golfer
- Shannon Bahrke (born 1980), American freestyle skier
- Shannon Baker (born 1980), New Zealand Rugby player
- Shannon Barnett (born 1982), American composer
- Shannon Bell (born 1955), Canadian performance philosopher
- Shannon Beveridge (born 1992), American YouTube personality
- Shannon Bex (born 1980), American singer
- Shannon Birchard (born 1994), Canadian curler
- Shannon Bilbray-Axelrod (born 1973), American politician
- Shannon Bobbitt (born 1985), American basketball player
- Shannon Bolin (1917–2016), American actress and singer
- Shannon Boxx (born 1977), American soccer player
- Shannon Bramer (born 1973), Canadian poet
- Shannon Bream (born 1970), American journalist
- Shannon Campbell (born 1996), Australian footballer
- Shannon Cassidy (1961–1999), American voice actress
- Shannon Chan-Kent (born 1988), Canadian voice actress
- Shannon Click (born 1983), American model
- Shannon Cochran (born 1958), American actress
- Shannon Conley, American actress
- Shannon Corbett, Canadian politician
- Shannon Crawford (born 1963), Canadian rower
- Shannon Cunneen (born 1977), Australian cricketer
- Shannon Curfman (born 1985), American singer
- Shannon Curtis, American dreampop singer
- Shannon Dawdy (born 1967), American historian
- Shannon Day (1896–1977), American actress
- Shannon Delany, American author
- Shannen Doherty (1971–2024), American actress
- Shannon Rogers Duckworth, American bishop
- Shannon Elizabeth (born 1973), American actress
- Shannon Flynn (born 1996), English actress
- Shannon Galpin (born 1974), American film producer
- Shannon Galpin (born 1974), American film producer
- Shannon Grove (born 1965), American politician
- Shannon Hale (born 1974), American author
- Shannon Jackson, American author and performance theorist
- Shannon Kane (born 1986), American actress
- Shannon Lee (born 1969), American actress and businesswoman
- Shannon Lucid (born 1943), American biochemist and astronaut
- Shannon Lundgren (born 1972), American politician
- Shannon Lynn (born 1985), Scottish footballer
- Shannon Magrane (born 1995), American singer
- Shannon Mato (born 1998), Australian rugby league player
- Shannon McGregor (born 1999), Scottish association football player
- Shannon McRandle (born 1969), American makeup artist and model
- Shannon Miller (born 1977), American artistic gymnast
- Shannon Murphy, Australian director
- Shannon Oksanen (born 1967), Canadian artist, musician
- Shannon O'Neill (comedian), American comedian
- Shannon O'Neill (politician) (born 1937), Canadian politician
- Shannon Osika (born 1993), American middle-distance runner
- Shannon Purser (born 1997), American actress
- Shannon Ray (born 1995), American sprinter
- Shannon Richardson (born 1977), American actress and convicted felon
- Shannon Ryan (born 1996), English professional boxer
- Shannon Spruill (1975–2021), American professional wrestler, wrestling manager and actress performing as Daffney
- Shannon C. Stimson (born 1951), American political theorist
- Shannon Stubbs (born 1979), Canadian politician
- Shannon Tweed (born 1957), Canadian actress
- Shannon Walker (born 1965), American astronaut and physicist
- Shannon Watters, American comics editor and writer
- Shannon Wayne, American politician
- Shannon Whirry, American actor

== Men ==
- Shannon Bennett (born 1975), Australian chef and author
- Shannon Birchall, Australian born musician
- Shannon Blunt, American radar engineer
- Shannon Boatman (born 1984), Canadian football player
- Shannon Breen (born 1989), American football player
- Shannon Boyd (born 1992), Australian football player
- Shannon Boyd-Bailey McCune (1913–1993), American geographer
- Shannon Briggs (born 1971), American professional boxer
- Shannon Brown (born 1985), American Basketball player
- Shannon Breen (born 1989), American football player
- Shannon Clavelle (born 1973), American football player
- Shannon Cole (born 1984), Australian NJ football player
- Shannon Corcoran (born 1971), American football player
- Shannon Culver (born 1971), Canadian football player
- Shannon Dallas (born 1977), Australian skier
- Shannon DeLoach, American politician
- Shannon Denton, American storyteller
- Shannon Hegarty (born 1979), Australian rugby league player
- Richard Shannon Hoon, rock musician from Indiana
- Shannon Leto (born 1970), American drummer
- Shannon McIlroy (born 1987), New Zealand lawn bowler
- Shannon Mitchell (born 1972), American football player
- Shannon Nevin (born 1976), Australian rugby league player
- Shannon Noll (born 1975), Australian singer
- Shannon Seebohm (born 1988), Australian basketball coach
- Shannon Sharpe (born 1968), American football player
- Shannon Charles Thomas (1971–2005), American murderer
- Shannon Wakeman (born 1990), Australian rugby league player
- Shannon Wheeler, American cartoonist
- Shannon Zimmerman (born 1972), American politician

=== Shannen ===
- Shannen Doherty (1971-2024) American actress
- Shannen Rossmiller (1970-2020) American online terrorist-hunter
- Shannen W. Coffin (born September 19, 1969) American attorney

=== Shanne ===
- Shanne Bradley (born 1957), British punk musician, songwriter, and artist
- Shanne Braspennincx (born 1991), Dutch cyclist

=== Shanno ===
- Shanno Devi (1901-1978), Indian politician
- Shanno Khurana (born 1927), Indian classical vocalist and composer
- Shanno Tam (born 1997), Canadian badminton player

=== Shanon ===
- Shanon Carmelia (born 1989) Curaçaoan professional footballer
- Shanon Cook (Born In Melbourne, Australia) Australian entertainment journalist
- Shanon Hays (born 1968) American softball coach
- Shanon Shah (born 1978) Malaysian singer-songwriter
- Shanon Slack (born 1983) American mixed martial arts fighter

==== Shano ====
- Shano Collins (1885-1955) American baseball player

== See also ==
- Shannan (disambiguation)
- Shannon-Ogbnai Abeda (born 1996), Eritrean-Canadian alpine skier
- List of Irish-language given names
- Shannon (surname)
- Benny Shanon (1948-2025) Israeli profesor of psychology
