= Namsan (disambiguation) =

Namsan is a mountain in Seoul, South Korea.

Namsan also may refer to:

== Mountains ==
- Namsan (Chagang) in Chagang Province, North Korea
- Namsan (Chungju) in Chungju City, North Chungcheong Province, South Korea
- Namsan (Gyeongju) in the heart of Gyeongju National Park, in Gyeongju City, North Gyeongsang Province, South Korea.
- Namsan (Haeju) in Haeju-si, South Hwanghae Province, North Korea
- Namsan (Sangju) in Sangju City, North Gyeongsang Province, South Korea

== People ==
- Yŏn Namsan (639–701), third son of the Goguryeo military leader and dictator Yeon Gaesomun

== Stations ==
- Namsan station (Busan Metro), a station of Busan Metro Line 1 in Busan, South Korea
- Namsanjeong station, a station of Busan Metro Line 3 in Busan, South Korea

== Structures ==
- Namsan Seoul Tower, a communication and observation tower in Seoul
- Namsan Cable Car, an aerial tramway in Seoul

== See also ==
- 南山 (disambiguation)
- Nanshan (disambiguation)
- South Mountain (disambiguation)
