= Shannon (surname) =

- Pronunciation: /ˈʃænən/ SHAN-ən

Origin
- Language: Old Irish
- Origin: senchaid
- Derivation: cognate
- Meaning: "skilled storyteller"

Other names
- Variant forms: MacShannon, O'Shannon
- Cognate: senchaid

Shannon, MacShannon, and O'Shannon are Anglicised Irish and Scottish surnames that derive from the Gaelic word seanachaidh, which means "skilled storyteller". Seanachaidh is descended from the Old Irish word senchaid.

Other forms of the name are O'Shawnessey or O'Shannahan.

Several old Gaelic names of Scottish and Irish people alike were Anglicised as Shannon, despite being unrelated.

The 1990 United States Census found that Shannon was a very common surname (No. 679 out of 88,799) in the United States.

== People with the surname Shannon ==
=== Academics ===
- Frederick A. Shannon (1921–1965), American herpetologist
- Richard Shannon (historian) (1931–2022), British historian

=== Artists ===
- David Shannon (born 1960), American author
- Del Shannon (1934–1990), American rock and roll musician (Real name is Charles Weedon Westover)
- Frank Shannon (1874–1959), Irish-American actor and writer
- James Jebusa Shannon (1862–1923), Anglo-American painter
- Joe Shannon (born 1933), Puerto Rican artist, art critic, curator, and art professor
- John Shannon (musician) (born 1980), American modern folk guitarist, vocalist, and composer
- Johnny Shannon (born 1932), English actor
- Julia Shannon, American daguerreotypist
- Marie Shannon (born 1960), New Zealand artist, art photographer, and teacher
- Mem Shannon (born 1959), American blues singer-guitarist
- Michael Shannon (born 1974), American actor
- Molly Shannon (born 1964), American actor
- Preston Shannon (1947–2018), American blues guitarist, singer and songwriter
- Robert T. Shannon (1895–1950), American screenwriter
- Sharon Shannon (born 1968), Irish musician
- T. Sean Shannon (fl. 2000s), American performer and writer
- Terry Shannon (1952–2005), American engineer and writer
- Tommy Shannon (born 1946), American bassist

=== Journalists ===
- Bob Shannon (Radio) (born 1942), Canadian journalist
- Bob Shannon (WCBS-FM) (born 1948), American journalist
- Mark Shannon (born c. 1950), American journalist
- Paul Shannon (1909–1990), American journalist
- Scott Shannon (fl. c. late 20th century), American journalist
- William V. Shannon (1927–1988), American journalist

=== Military personnel ===
- Christopher Shannon (RAF airman) (1899–?), English World War I flying ace
- Dave Shannon (1922–1993), Australian airman
- John W. Shannon (1933–2017), United States Under Secretary of the Army

=== Politicians ===
- David Shannon (1822–1875), South Australian politician
- George Shannon (explorer) (1785–1836), also U.S. Senator
- Harvey Alex Shannon (1831–1906), American Confederate States Army personnel, physician, and politician
- Howard Shannon (1892–1976), Australian politician
- James Shannon (1840–1891), South Australian politician
- James Michael Shannon (born 1952), American politician
- John Wallace Shannon (1862–1926), South Australian politician
- Nate Shannon, American politician
- Peter Shannon (born 1949), Australian diplomat
- Richard C. Shannon (1839–1920), US Representative from New York
- Steve Shannon (born 1971), American politician
- Thomas A. Shannon, Jr. (born c. 1960), American diplomat

=== Scientists ===
- Claude Shannon (1916–2001), American mathematician, electrical engineer and cryptographer known as "the father of information theory"
- Frederick A. Shannon (1921–1965), American biologist
- Raymond Corbett Shannon (1894–1945), American entomologist
- Robert D. Shannon (born 1935), American chemist

=== Sportspeople ===
- Darrin Shannon (born 1969), Canadian hockey player
- Darryl Shannon (born 1968), Canadian hockey player
- Frank Shannon (baseball) (1873–1934), American baseball player
- Les Shannon (1926–2007), English football player and manager
- Mike Shannon (1939–2023), American baseball player and sportscaster
- Noah Shannon (born 2000), American football player
- Rab Shannon (born 1966), Scottish football player
- Randy Shannon (born 1966), American football coach
- Ryan Shannon (born 1983), American hockey player
- Terrence Shannon Jr. (born 2000), American basketball player

=== Others ===
- Abe Shannon (1869–1945), South Australian pastoralist
- Ricard Shannon (1920–1989), American film and television actor

== See also ==
- The Shannons
- Shannon family
- The Shannons of Broadway
- Shannon (given name)
