= Baodai =

Baodai 保岱镇
- Town
- Bǎodài Zhèn
- Location in Hebei Location in China
- Coordinates: 40°17′18″N 115°08′10″E
- Country: People's Republic of China
- Province: Hebei
- Prefecture-level city: Zhangjiakou
- County: Zhuolu

Area
  - Total: 96.06 km^{2} (37.09 sq mi)

Population (2010)
  - Total: 28,505
  - Density: 296.8/km^{2} (769/sq mi)
- Time zone: UTC+8 (China Standard)

Baodai (Chinese: 保岱镇; pinyin: Bǎodài Zhèn) is a town located in Zhuolu County, Zhangjiakou, Hebei, China. According to the 2010 census, Baodai had a population of 28,505, including 15,101 males and 13,404 females. The population was distributed as follows: 4,484 people aged under 14, 21,078 people aged between 15 and 64, and 2,943 people aged over 65.

== See also ==
- List of township-level divisions of Hebei
