= Southmont =

Southmont may refer to:

- Southmont, North Carolina, United States
- Southmont, Pennsylvania, United States
- Southmont High School, in Montgomery County, Indiana, United States

== See also ==
- South Mountain (disambiguation)
