= Shannon =

Shannon may refer to:

== People ==
- Shannon (given name)
- Shannon (surname)
- Shannon (American singer), stage name of singer Brenda Shannon Greene (born 1958)
- Shannon (South Korean singer), British-South Korean singer and actress Shannon Arrum Williams (born 1998)
- Shannon, intermittent stage name of English singer-songwriter Marty Wilde (born 1939)

== Places ==
=== Australia ===
- Shannon, Tasmania, a locality
- Hundred of Shannon, a cadastral unit in South Australia
- Shannon, a former name for the area named Calomba, South Australia since 1916
- Shannon River (Western Australia)
- Shannon, Western Australia, a locality in the Shire of Manjimup
- Shannon National Park, a national park in Western Australia

=== Canada ===
- Shannon, New Brunswick, a community
- Shannon, Quebec, a city
- Shannon Bay, former name of Darrell Bay, British Columbia
- Shannon Falls, a waterfall in British Columbia

=== Ireland ===
- River Shannon, the longest river in Ireland
  - Shannon Cave, a subterranean section of the River Shannon
  - Shannon Pot, source of the River Shannon
  - Shannon Estuary
- Shannon, County Clare, a town near Shannon Airport
- Shannon Region, unofficial region in Ireland
- Shannon, a sea area in the BBC's Shipping Forecast weather report

=== United States ===
- Shannon, Alabama
- Shannon, Georgia
- Shannon, Illinois
- Shannon, Kansas
- Shannon, Kentucky
- Shannon, Mississippi
- Shannon, North Carolina
- Shannon, Texas
- Shannon County, Missouri
- Oglala Lakota County, South Dakota, formerly known as Shannon County
- Shannon River (Minnesota)
- Shannon Creek, a stream near North Cascades National Park, Washington
- Lake Shannon, a reservoir in Whatcom County, Washington

=== Elsewhere ===
- Shannon, New Zealand
- Shannon Island, Greenland

== Arts and entertainment ==
- Shannon (1961 TV series), starring George Nader (syndicated)
- Shannon (1981 TV series), starring Kevin Dobson (Columbia Broadcasting System)
- "Shannon" (song), a song by Henry Gross

== Organisations ==
- Shannon Development, a development company in Ireland
- Shannon Racing, a defunct motor racing team
- Shannon Racing Cars, a defunct Formula One constructor
- Shannon RFC, a rugby club in Limerick

== Transportation ==
- Shannon Airport, Ireland
- Shannon (locomotive), an 0-4-0WT steam locomotive built in 1857
- Shannon-class lifeboat, a British type of lifeboat
- Shannon (2009 ship), one of SpaceX's two Dragon capsule recovery vessels (formerly known as MV GO Navigator)

== Other uses ==
- Earl of Shannon, a title in the Irish peerage
- HMS Shannon, several Royal Navy ships
- Shannon (horse) (1941–1955), Australian Hall-of-Fame racehorse
- Technological University of the Shannon: Midlands Midwest, an Irish university
- shannon (unit), the information content of one bit
- Shannon, a satellite - see Lynk Global

== See also ==
- Shannon index, a biodiversity index
- Noisy-channel coding theorem, sometimes called Shannon Limit, the theoretical limit to capacity of a communication channel
- Shannan (disambiguation)
