= Minami (name) =

- Gender: Feminine (occasionally masculine)
- Language: Japanese

Origin
- Language: Japonic
- Meaning: Different meanings depending on the kanji used.

Other names
- Related names: Minamida, Minamino, Minamiyama

Minami (みなみ; ミナミ; 南, lit. "south") is both a Japanese surname and a feminine Japanese given name (occasionally used for males).

== Written forms ==
As a surname, Minami is most frequently written in kanji as 南, meaning "south". Minami (南) is shared by 100,000+ individuals in Japan. The remaining variants are used by less than 2,000 individuals each and are generally used by related families.

- 南, "south" (also a male/female given name)
- 南海, "the south sea" (This surname may also be a given name).
- 美並, "average beauty"
- 美波, "a beautiful wave"
- 見並, "look, average"
- 見波, "look, wave"
- 見浪, "look, wave"
- 皆見, "every look"
- 皆美, "every beauty"
- 皆巳, "every snake"
- 三浪, "three waves"
- 三波, "three waves"
- 巳波, "snake, wave"
- 己波, "oneself, wave"
- 味波, "flavor/taste, wave"

As a given name, Minami may be written as simply "みなみ" and rarely "ミナミ", or it can be written using different kanji characters or a mix of hiragana and kanji to convey different meanings, such as:

- 南海, "the south sea"
- 美南, "the beautiful south"
- 美海, "the beautiful sea" (This name can also be read as Mina.)
- 美波, "a beautiful wave"
- 三波, "three waves"
- 未渚美, "the yet beautiful beach"
- 実海, "wave of truth"
- みな実, "every truth"
- みな美, "every beauty"

== People with the surname ==
- Akina Minami (南 明奈, born 1989), Japanese gravure idol and tarento
- Dale Minami (born 1946), Japanese American lawyer
- Eiko Minami (南 栄子, born 1909), Japanese dancer
- Haruka Minami (みなみ 遥), Japanese manga artist
- Haruo Minami (三波 春夫, 1923–2001), Japanese enka singer
- Hikari Minami (みなみ 飛香, born 1994), Japanese professional wrestler
- Hiroaki Minami (南 弘明, born 1934), Japanese composer
- Jirō Minami (南 次郎, 1874–1955), Japanese general and convicted World War II war criminal
- Kaho Minami (南 果歩, born 1964), Japanese actress
- Katsuyuki Minami (南 克幸, born 1970), Japanese volleyball player
- Kunzo Minami (南 薫造, 1883–1950), Japanese painter
- Moeka Minami (南 萌華, born 1998), Japanese women's footballer
- Omi Minami (南 央美, born 1968), Japanese voice actress, essayist and columnist
- Yoshiharu Minami (南 喜陽, 1951–2024), Japanese judoka
- Yoshikazu Minami (南 芳一, born 1963), Japanese professional shogi player
- Yoshitaka Minami (南 佳孝, born 1950), Japanese musician
- Yuta Minami (南 雄太, born 1979), Japanese footballer

== People with the given name ==
=== Women ===
- Minami (actress) (美波, born 1986), Japanese actress
- Minami (singer) (美波, born 1997), Japanese singer
- Minami Ando (安藤 みなみ; born 1997), Japanese table tennis player
- Minami Aoyama (青山 南, born 1985), Japanese pink film actress and AV idol
- Minami Hamabe (浜辺 美波, born 2000), Japanese actress
- Minami Hokuto (北都 南), Japanese voice actress
- Minami Iju (伊集 南, born 1990), Japanese women's basketball player
- Minami Itahashi (板橋 美波, born 2000), Japanese diver
- Minami Kato (加藤 美南, born 1999), Japanese idol, singer and former member of NGT48
- Minami Kuribayashi (栗林 みな実, born 1976), Japanese singer-songwriter and voice actress
- Minami Minegishi (峯岸 みなみ, born 1992), Japanese idol and member of AKB48 and no3b
- Minami Otomo (大友 みなみ, born 1981), Japanese actress and model
- Minami Ozaki (尾崎 南, born 1968), Japanese manga artist, also known as Ryo Minami (南亮) and Minami Himemuro (姫室ミナミ)
- Minami Sadamasu (貞升 南, born 1986), Japanese professional shogi player
- Minami Takahashi (高橋 みなみ, born 1991), Japanese singer, tarento, and former member of AKB48
- Minami Takayama (高山 みなみ, born 1964), Japanese voice actress, narrator, singer and composer
- Minami Tanaka (田中 美海, born 1996), Japanese voice actress
- Minami Tanaka (announcer) (田中 みな実, born 1986), announcer and tarento
- Minami Yamanouchi (山ノ内 みなみ, born 1992), Japanese long-distance runner

=== Men ===
- Minami Aoyama (青山南, born 1949), male Japanese translator, essayist, American literary researcher, literary critic, picture book writer, real name Shigeru Sugiyama
- Minami Ichikawa (市川南 (映画プロデューサー), born 1966), male Japanese film producer

== Fictional characters ==
As a given name

- Minami Amada (天田 南), a character in the manga Jormungand
- Minami Hayama (葉山 南), a character in the Japanese television drama Long Vacation
- Minami Iwasaki (岩崎 みなみ), a character in the Japanese multimedia franchise Lucky Star
- Minami Kaido (海藤 みなみ), a character in the anime series Go! Princess PreCure
- Minami Katayama (片山 実波), a character in the manga and anime series Wake Up, Girls!
- Minami Kotobuki (寿 みなみ), a character in manga and anime series Oshi no Ko
- Minami Maki (真木 南), a character in the manga Majitora!
- Minami Nanba (難波 南), a male character in the manga Hana-Kimi
- Minami Sakurai (桜井 水波), a character in the web novel series The Irregular at Magic High School
- Minami Shimada (島田 美波), a character in the light novel series Baka and Test
- Minami Takahashi (高橋 みなみ), a character in the anime series AKB0048
- Minami Toba (鳥羽 美波), a character in the manga series Laid-Back Camp

As a surname

- The Minami (南) sisters (Haruka (春香), Kana (夏奈), and Chiaki (千秋)), characters in the manga series Minami-ke
- Itsuki Minami (南 樹), a character in the anime and manga series Air Gear
- Kaori Minami (南 佳織), a character in the Japanese multimedia franchise Battle Royale
- Ken Minami (美波 ケン), a character in the manga Machine Robo Rescue
- Kenjirō Minami (南 健次郎), a character in the anime and manga series Yuri on Ice
- Kohtaro Minami (南 光太郎), a character in the Japanese superhero drama series Kamen Rider Black and Kamen Rider Black RX
- Kotori Minami (南 ことり), a character in the Japanese multimedia franchise Love Live! School Idol Project
- Mirei Minami (南 みれぃ), a character in the Japanese multimedia franchise Pripara
- Rena Minami (水波 レナ), a character in the anime series Puella Magi Madoka Magica
- Shizuku Minami (南 しずく), a character in the manga Sakura Trick
- Tsuyoshi Minami (南 烈), a character in the manga Slam Dunk
- Youichi Minami (南 陽一), a character in the manga Gokusen
- Yuko Minami (南 夕子), a character in the Japanese superhero drama series Ultraman Ace
- Yume Minami (南 夢芽), one of the main protagonists of the anime series SSSS.Dynazenon
