= Zhuolu County =

Zhuolu County 涿鹿县 Cholu
- County
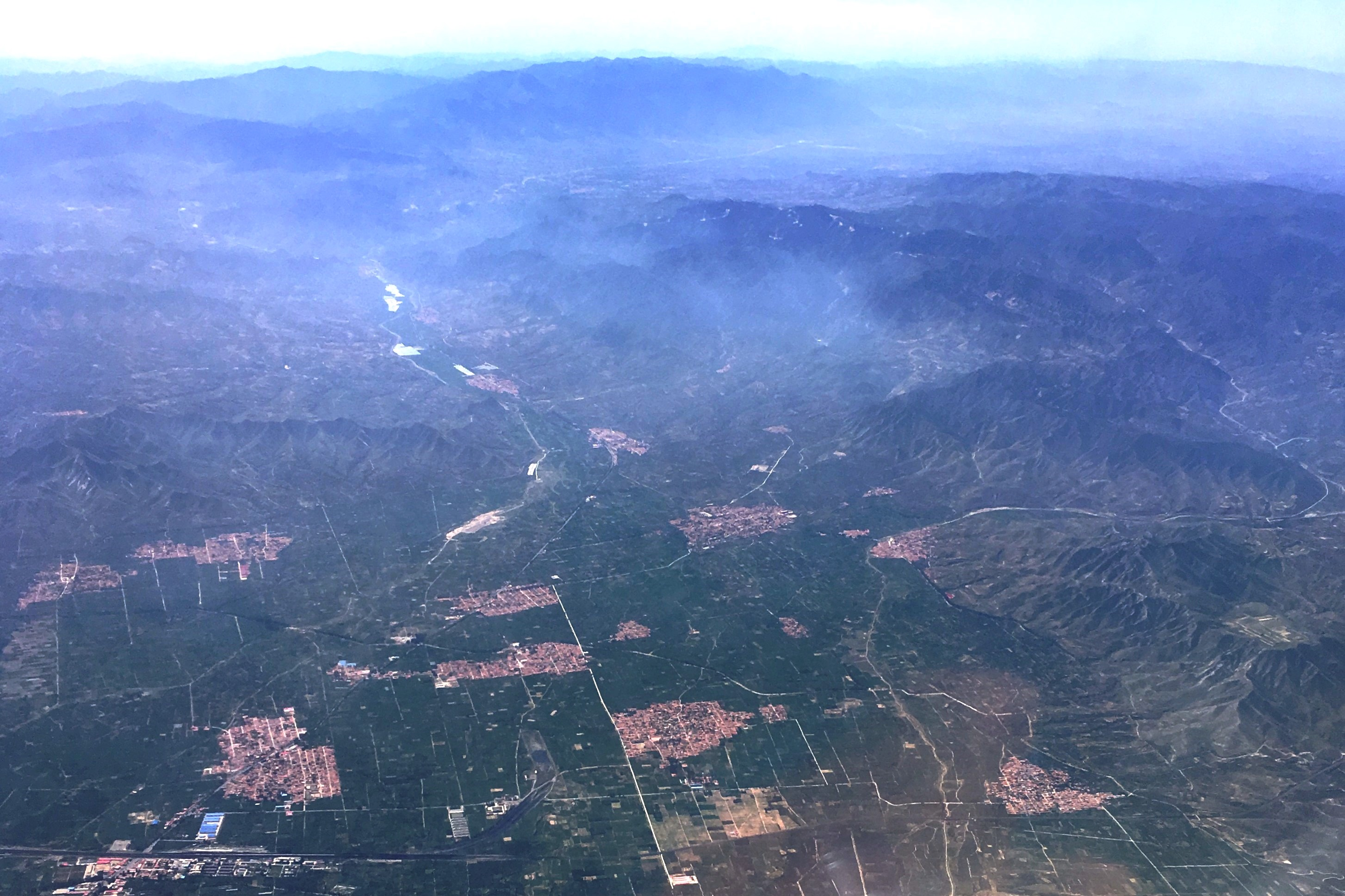
- Sanggan River Valley

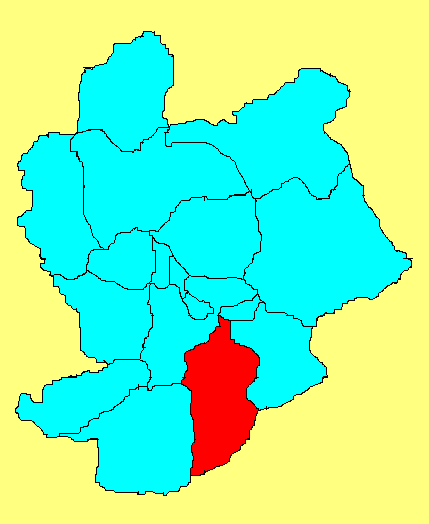
- Location in Zhangjiakou

- Location of the seat in Hebei
- Coordinates: 40°22′N 115°13′E
- Country: People's Republic of China
- Province: Hebei
- Prefecture-level city: Zhangjiakou
- County seat: Zhuolu Town

Area
  - Total: 2,802 km^{2} (1,082 sq mi)

Population (2020 census)
  - Total: 294,013
  - Density: 104.9/km^{2} (271.8/sq mi)
- Time zone: UTC+8 (China Standard)
- Postal code: 075600
- Area code: 0313

Zhuolu County (simplified Chinese: 涿鹿县; traditional Chinese: 涿鹿縣; pinyin: Zhuōlù Xiàn) is a county in the northwest of Hebei province, bordering Beijing's Mentougou District to the east. It is under the administration of the Zhangjiakou city. It has eight towns, nine townships, and 373 village-level units (行政村). It is located near the confluence of the Sanggan River (桑干河) and Yang River (洋河) tributaries to the Yongding River, on the banks of Sanggan River. Zhuolu has 2802 square kilometers (approximately 1082 square miles), with a population of 294,000 inhabitants (2020 census). Its postal code number is 075600, and its telephone area code is 0313.

== Historical uncertainty ==
Modern Zhuolu may or may not have been the location of the historical Battle of Zhuolu. However, it is promoted for tourism as such. Modern Zhuolu may or may not have been the location of what is claimed to be the only city founded by the legendary Yellow Emperor, (Chinese: 黄帝; pinyin: Huáng dì) although there is evidence to support this case.

== Historic sites and scenic spots ==
Among the historic, scenic, or tourist destination spots, there are several associated with Huang di (the Yellow Emperor) and his rival Chi You. Besides this historical-type tourism, ecological tourism is also offered, although industrial plant/sector tours seem to be less widely advertised. As of June, 2009, an investment of 2,000,000 (US$) is planned to develop and promote grape and wine country tours, in the so-called "Zhuolu Grape Sightseeing Zone".

== Economy ==
Aside from tourism, the local economy is typified by heavy manufacturing industries, together with viticulture and orchard produce, such as almonds. The Zhangjiakou vicinity is typified by iron and steel metallurgy. According to a Chinese government source, Zhuolu has the "largest grape plantation in Asia", being particularly noted for producing the Longyan grape, but also growing over twenty other varieties.

== Grapes and wine ==
Zhuolu is considered to be part of the Huai-Zhuo Basin viticultural region, along with Xuanhua and Huailai. With a claimed heat summation of 3532 degrees Celsius and 413 mm (approximately sixteen and one-quarter inches) of annual rainfall, a sandy, lime, loam soil, and a distinct day/night temperature, together with the cool, dry summers, Zhuolu may be quite suitable for the production of Vitis vinefera-based wines, such as Cabernet sauvignon.

== Administrative divisions ==
Zhuolu County is subdivided into the following:

The county-administered district is Nanshan District (南山区)

Towns:

- Zhuolu Town, Zhangjiabu (张家堡镇), Wujiagou (武家沟镇), Wubu (五堡镇), Baodai (保岱镇), Fanshan (矾山镇), Dabu (大堡镇), Hedong (河东镇), Dongxiaozhuang (东小庄镇), Dahenan (大河南镇), Huiyao (辉耀镇)

Townships:

- Luanzhuang Township (栾庄乡), Wenquantun Township (温泉屯乡), Heishansi Township (黑山寺乡), Wofosi Township (卧佛寺乡), Xiejiabu Township (谢家堡乡), Mangshikou Township (蟒石口乡)

== Climate ==
Climate data for Zhuolu, elevation 530 m (1,740 ft), (1991–2020 normals, extremes 1981–present)
Month	Jan	Feb	Mar	Apr	May	Jun	Jul	Aug	Sep	Oct	Nov	Dec	Year
Record high °C (°F)	12.3 (54.1)	17.7 (63.9)	28.9 (84.0)	32.2 (90.0)	39.0 (102.2)	37.8 (100.0)	39.2 (102.6)	37.1 (98.8)	35.9 (96.6)	28.3 (82.9)	20.8 (69.4)	15.8 (60.4)	39.2 (102.6)
Mean daily maximum °C (°F)	−0.5 (31.1)	4.1 (39.4)	11.3 (52.3)	19.8 (67.6)	26.1 (79.0)	29.6 (85.3)	30.7 (87.3)	29.4 (84.9)	24.9 (76.8)	17.5 (63.5)	8.0 (46.4)	0.8 (33.4)	16.8 (62.2)
Daily mean °C (°F)	−6.5 (20.3)	−2.6 (27.3)	4.5 (40.1)	12.6 (54.7)	19.1 (66.4)	22.9 (73.2)	24.8 (76.6)	23.4 (74.1)	18.0 (64.4)	10.5 (50.9)	1.9 (35.4)	−4.8 (23.4)	10.3 (50.6)
Mean daily minimum °C (°F)	−11.2 (11.8)	−7.9 (17.8)	−1.5 (29.3)	5.8 (42.4)	12.2 (54.0)	16.9 (62.4)	19.8 (67.6)	18.4 (65.1)	12.3 (54.1)	4.9 (40.8)	−2.7 (27.1)	−9.1 (15.6)	4.8 (40.7)
Record low °C (°F)	−23.5 (−10.3)	−23.9 (−11.0)	−16.0 (3.2)	−5.2 (22.6)	0.1 (32.2)	6.1 (43.0)	9.7 (49.5)	8.5 (47.3)	−0.2 (31.6)	−8.6 (16.5)	−16.5 (2.3)	−22.2 (−8.0)	−23.9 (−11.0)
Average precipitation mm (inches)	2.0 (0.08)	3.5 (0.14)	8.5 (0.33)	17.8 (0.70)	32.9 (1.30)	67.6 (2.66)	97.9 (3.85)	77.4 (3.05)	50.8 (2.00)	22.0 (0.87)	9.4 (0.37)	2.1 (0.08)	391.9 (15.43)
Average precipitation days (≥ 0.1 mm)	1.7	2.0	3.5	5.2	7.3	11.0	12.5	10.6	8.3	5.5	2.9	1.9	72.4
Average snowy days	2.8	3.2	3.1	0.9	0	0	0	0	0	0.3	2.8	2.9	16
Average relative humidity (%)	43	39	38	38	43	56	68	69	64	56	50	45	51
Mean monthly sunshine hours	197.4	197.7	241.2	255.3	279.5	249.9	241.2	244.2	227.5	215.9	186.6	186.3	2,722.7
Percentage possible sunshine	66	65	65	64	62	56	53	58	62	64	63	65	62
Source: China Meteorological Administrationall-time May high
