= Nam Shan =

Nam Shan (Chinese: 南山) is the name of several places in Hong Kong, including:

- Nam Shan (Lantau), a place on Lantau Island
- Nam Shan (Sai Kung District), a village in Sai Kung District
- Nam Shan (Sha Tin District), a village in the Siu Lek Yuen area of Sha Tin District
- Nam Shan Estate, a public housing estate in Shek Kip Mei
- Nam Shan, Tai Hang Tung & Tai Hang Sai (constituency), a constituency of Sham Shui Po District

== See also ==
- 南山 (disambiguation)
- Nam Long Shan
