= South Mountain =

South Mountain or South Mountains may refer to:

== Canada ==
- South Mountain, a village in North Dundas, Ontario
- South Mountain (Nova Scotia), a mountain range
- South Mountain (band), a Canadian country music group

== United States ==
=== Landforms ===
- South Mountain (New Haven County, Connecticut), a mountain peak in the Hanging Hills
- South Mountain (New Mexico), a mountain range of New Mexico
- South Mountain (Ashland, New York), in the Catskill Mountains
- South Mountain (Delaware County, New York), in the Catskill Mountains
- South Mountain (Ulster County, New York), in the Catskill Mountains
- South Mountain (West Kill, New York), in the Catskill Mountains
- South Mountain (New York), in the Catskill Mountains
- South Mountain (Maryland and Pennsylvania), a northern extension of the Blue Ridge Mountains
- South Mountain (Eastern Pennsylvania), a ridge extending from Allentown to Reading
- South Mountain (La Sal Mountains), a mountain in San Juan County, Utah
- South Mountains (Arizona), in central Arizona
- South Mountains (Nevada/Utah), in White Pine County, Nevada and Juab County, Utah
- South Mountains (North Carolina)

=== Parks ===
- South Mountain Park, Arizona, a municipal park in Phoenix
- South Mountain Reservation in Essex County, New Jersey
- South Mountain State Park, Maryland
- South Mountains State Park, North Carolina, in the South Mountains range

=== Other ===
- South Mountain, Texas, a town
- "South Mountain Forest", the 1913 designation for a Pennsylvania state forest area that became several state parks including Pine Grove Furnace State Park
- South Mountain Freeway, part of Arizona State Route 202 in metropolitan Phoenix
- South Mountain Oil Field, near Santa Paula, California
- South Mountain Railroad (Cumberland), a railway line in Cumberland County, Pennsylvania
  - South Mountain Iron Company, a Pine Grove Furnace owner that established the South Mountain Railroad
  - South Mountain Mining and Iron Company, last private owner of the Pine Grove Iron Works
  - South Mountain Railway and Mining Company, second owner of the South Mountain Railroad
- Battle of South Mountain, a battle of the American Civil War, fought in Maryland

== See also ==
- 南山 (disambiguation), places that literally mean South Mountain in several Asian languages
- Southmont (disambiguation)
- Mountain (disambiguation)
- South (disambiguation)
