= Wusun Mountains =

Mountain range in Kazakhstan and China

Coordinates: 43°20′51″N 80°41′42″E

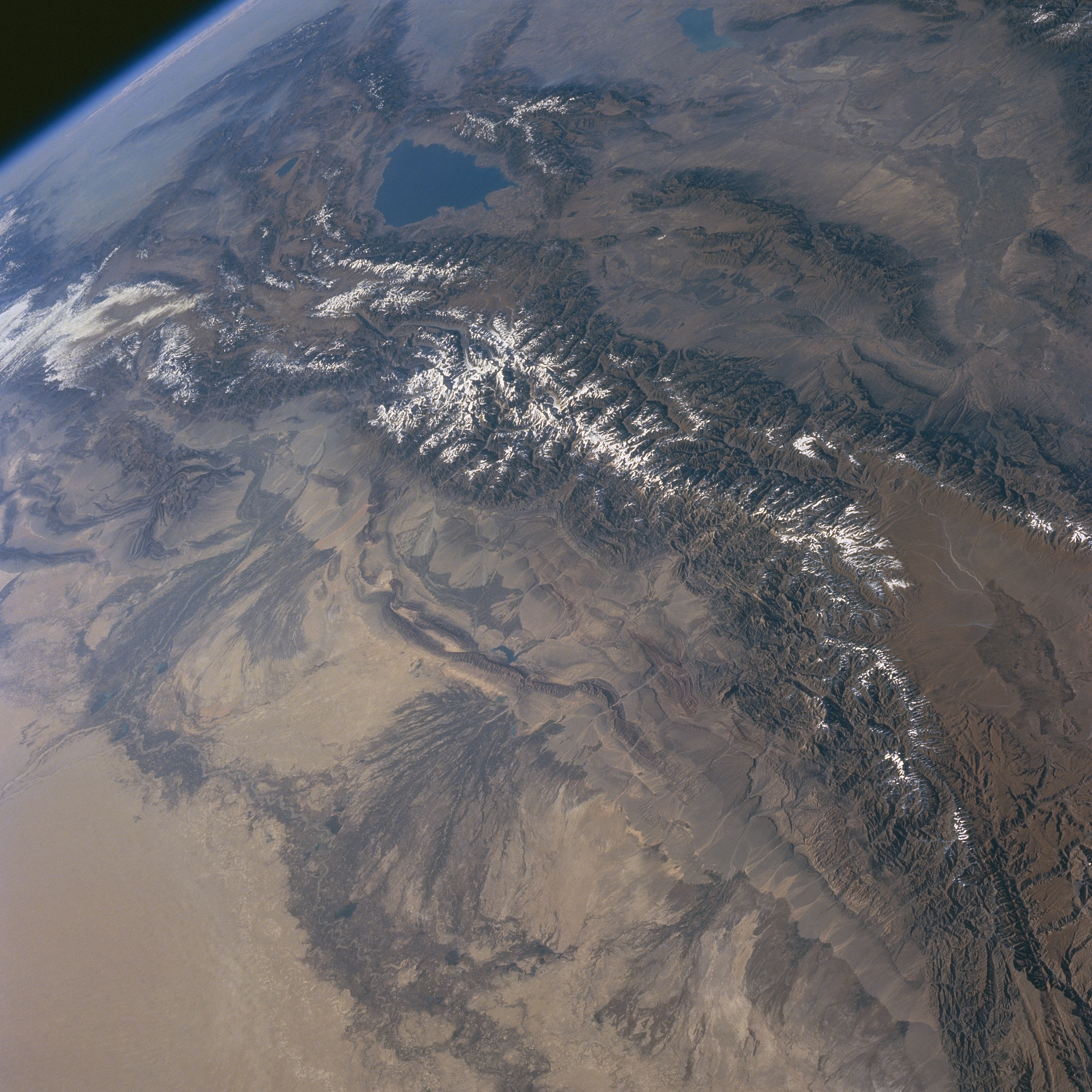
- A 1997 photograph of the Tianshan from space, its Wusun part lying in the top right between the wide Tekes and Ili valleys
- Traditional Chinese: 烏孫山(脉)
- Simplified Chinese: 乌孙山(脉)
- Literal meaning: Wusun Mountain (Range)
Transcriptions
Standard Mandarin
- Hanyu Pinyin: Wūsūn Shān(mài)

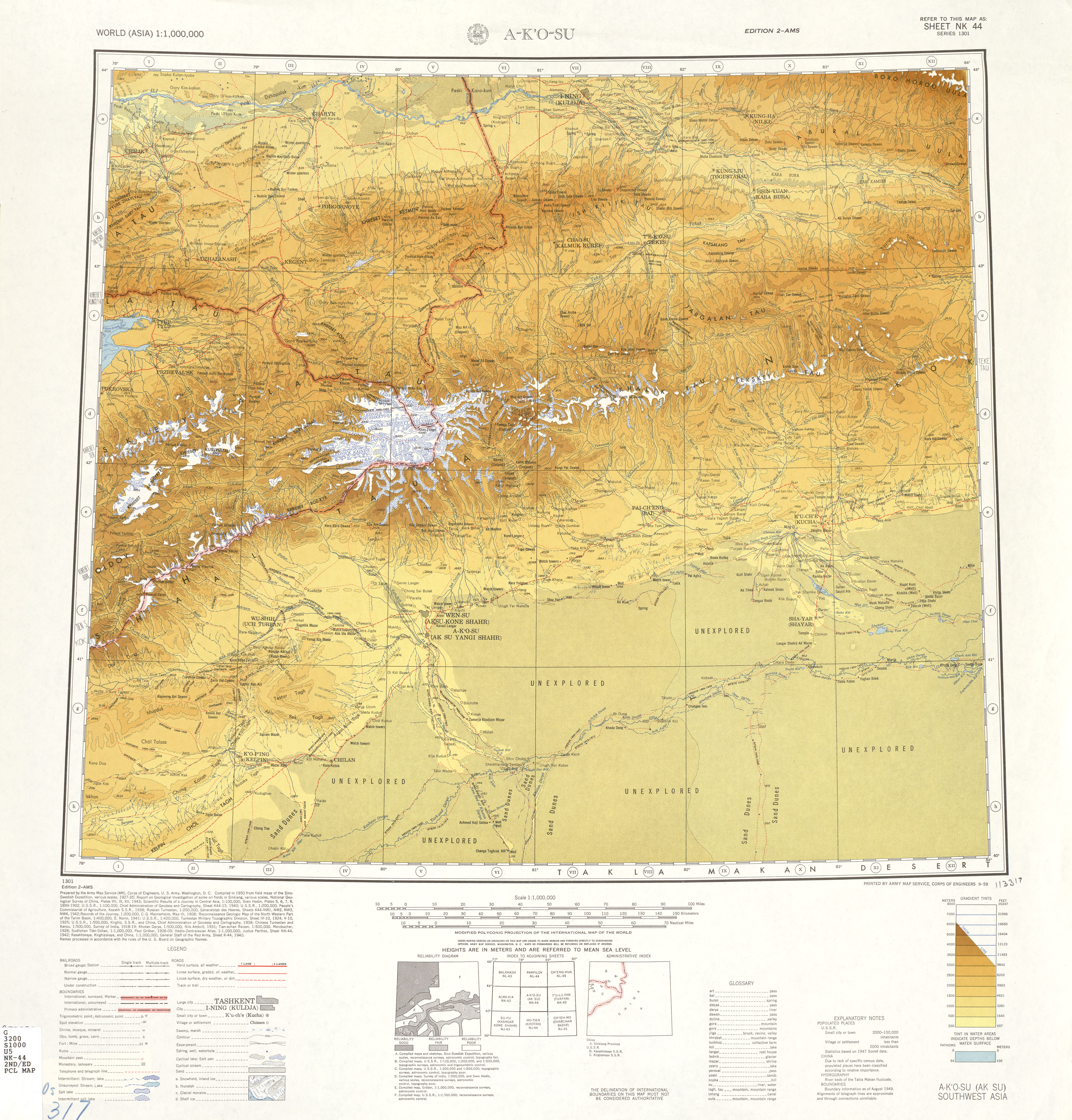
A 1950 map of the area, the Wusun Range labelled as "Khrebet Ketmen'" in Kazakhstan and "Ish Kilik Tau" in China

The Wusun Mountains or Ketmen Mountains are a small range in the central part of the Tianshan Mountains. They lie north of the Tekes River valley and south of the main Ili River valley in southeastern Kazakhstan and in western Xinjiang Province, China. The highest point is Baishi Peak (白石峰), about 3,475 meters (11,400 ft) above sea level.

== Names ==
Wūsūn is the pinyin form of the Chinese name written 烏孫 in traditional characters and 乌孙 in simplified ones, taken from the ancient Wusun people. It is sometimes distinguished as particularly the Chinese part of the range, the Kazakh area being the Ketmen Ridge.

The mountains have also been known as the Karatau (Russian: Каратау), Qaratau (Қаратау, "Black Mountain"), Temirlik (Kazakh: Темирлик, "Iron-Bearing" or "Producing"), and Nánshān (南山, "South" or "Southern Mountains").

== See also ==
- Tianshan Mountains
