= Shannon Galpin =

American film producer

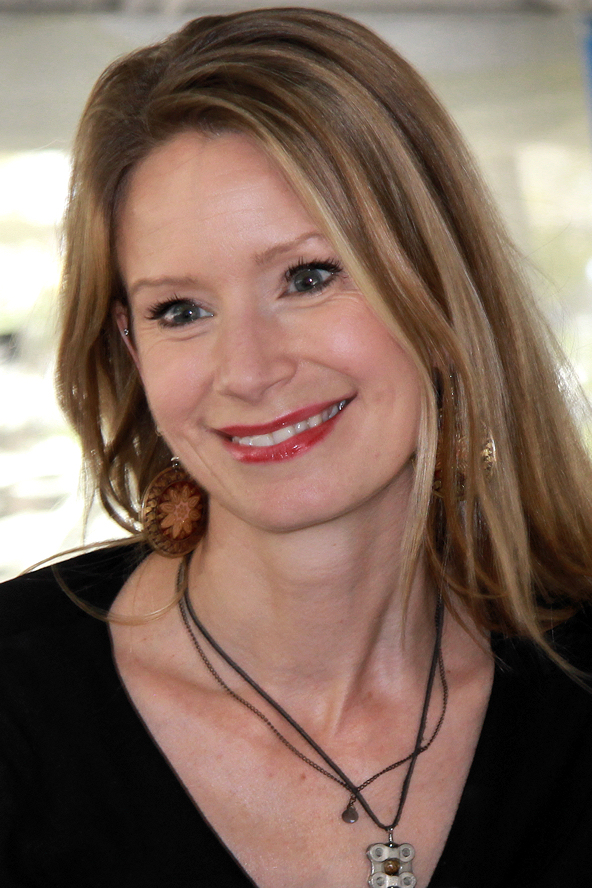
Galpin at the 2014 Texas Book Festival.

Shannon Galpin (born 1974) is an American activist, artist, and author.

Shannon is a Fellow with Royal Geographical Society and a Fellow with The Explorers Club since 2017. She founded the non profit, Mountain2Mountain, in 2006 to work with women and girls in Afghanistan. She worked in Afghanistan from 2008-2016 and helped support the first right to right cycling movement for women and girls in multiple provinces. In 2009, Shannon became the first woman to mountain bike in Afghanistan and continued cycling across Afghanistan for several years researching the gender barriers and cultural taboo with cycling and women and girls. She spent several years evacuating hundreds of Afghans athletes and family members during the collapse of the Afghan government and subsequent evacuation efforts. She is an outspoken two-time whistleblower against the Afghan Cycling Federation. In 2013, Galpin was named National Geographic Adventurer of the Year." Shannon was runner up for two consecutive years in Elevation Outdoors Magazine's Resident Badass poll, in the Humanitarian category. In 2011 Shannon founded, Combat Apathy as an art and activist umbrella for street art, public art installations, film making, graphic novels, and multi-media story telling. Shannon's latest project is the Afghan Women's Sports archive. The archive will preserve the history of Afghan women's athletic achievements through oral history, and preservation of photo, film, media, and artifacts before the history is erased forever.

== Life ==
Galpin was born in Minneapolis, Minnesota and grew up in Bismarck, North Dakota. She moved to Europe in 1994-2002. In 2006, she founded Mountain2Mountain. She founded Combat Apathy in 2011.

Galpin was a whistleblower against the Afghan Cycling Federation in 2015. In 2018, the President of the Afghan Cycling Federation was found guilty in a civil case in Kabul. She produced her first feature length documentary film, Afghan Cycles, with Let Media which premiered at Toronto Hot Docs in 2018

In 2021, she moved to Edinburgh, Scotland. In 2021, she began evacuating hundreds of Afghan athletes. In 2022 she opened a second whistleblower case against the Afghan Cycling Federation with the UCI Ethics Commission. In 2024 they issued a guilty verdict against ACF President Fazli.

She founded the Afghan Women's Sports Archive in 2025.

== Works ==
- Streets of Afghanistan: Bridging Cultures Through Art, Photographs by Libero Di Zinno, Hatherleigh Company, Limited, 2013, ISBN 9781578264674
- Mountain to Mountain: A Journey of Adventure and Activism for the Women of Afghanistan. St. Martin's Press. 16 September 2014. ISBN 978-1-4668-4705-7.
