= Shannan =

Shannan may refer to:

== Geographical regions ==
- Shannan, Tibet (山南市), prefecture-level city of the Tibet Autonomous Region, China
- Shaannan (陕南), or Southern Shaanxi, the southern part of Shaanxi province, China
- Shannan Circuit (山南道), a province of Tang Dynasty China, later divided into:

== People ==
- Shannan Click (born 1983), an American model
- Shannan Gilbert (died 2010), American murder victim
- Shannan McPherson (born 1985) rugby league footballer
- Shannan Ponton (born 1975), personal trainer on the Australian version of The Biggest Loser

== See also ==
- 山南 (disambiguation)
- Nanshan (disambiguation), referring to "南山", with the characters reversed
- Shannon (disambiguation)
