= Julia Shannon =

American photographer (1812–1852)

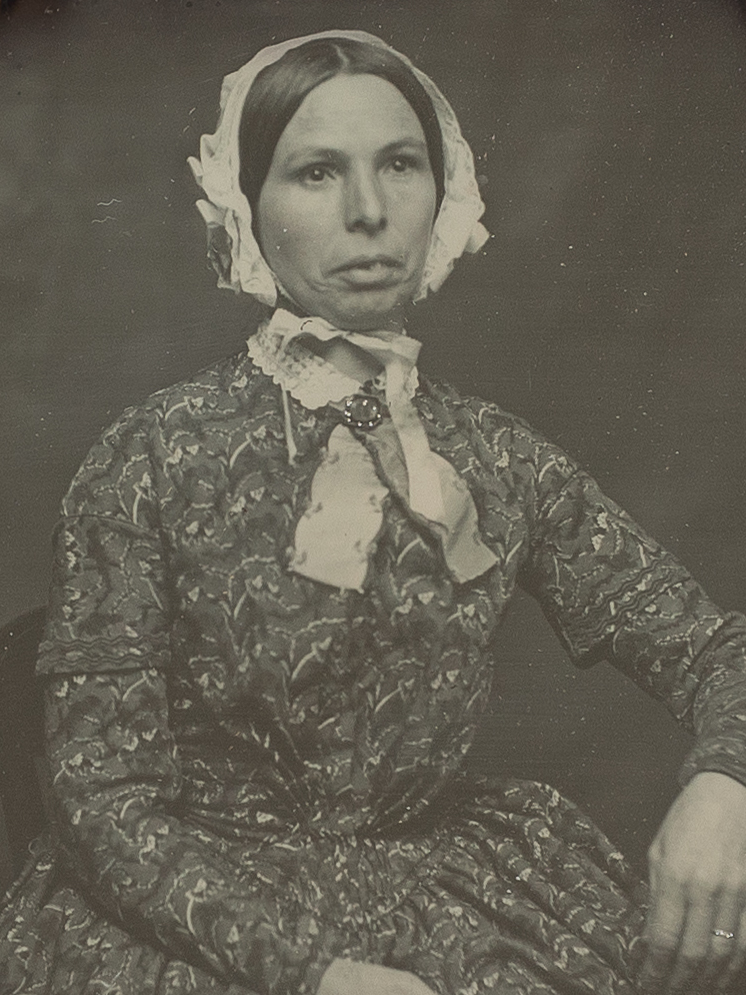
- Born: c. 1812
- Died: April 13, 1854
- Occupation: Photographer

Julia Shannon (c. 1812 – c. 1852) was an American photographer who worked in San Francisco in the 1850s. She was the first known woman photographer in California and probably the only woman working in her profession at the time in San Francisco.

== Biography ==
Shannon—whose birth name is not known—was born in England around 1812 and by 1832 was married to a man named Joseph Shannon; she later used the name Mrs. Julia Shannon. The Shannons initially lived in New York City, where their three children were born between 1833 and 1840. They moved to San Francisco in 1848 or 1849.

Mrs. Julia Shannon (as she styled herself) specialized in daguerrotypes. In 1850, with the California Gold Rush in full spate, she advertised as follows in the January issue of San Francisco Alta:

"Notice—Daguerreotypes taken by a Lady.—Those wishing to have a good likeness are informed that they can have them taken in a very superior manner, and by a real live lady too, in Clay St., opposite the St. Francis Hotel, at a very moderate charge. Give her a call, gents."

This advertisement places Shannon in San Francisco only one year after the arrival of the city's first photographer, Richard Carr, and clearly intends to capitalize on the novelty value of Shannon's status as a woman photographer. The only other woman associated with the profession of photography who was listed in local publications and directories of the 1850s was a colorist for one of Shannon's competitors, making it likely that Shannon was the only woman pursuing the profession of daguerrotypist in the city at the time. The second documented woman photographer in the city was Mrs. Amanda M. Genung of Stockton, a daguerreotypist who set up shop in San Francisco in 1860.

It appears from a subsequent advertisement in the same publication that Shannon was also a midwife.

In 1851, a catastrophic fire that destroyed a quarter of the city took with it the two houses that Shannon owned on Sacramento Street; they were valued at $7000 (the equivalent of over $400,000 in 2015), indicating that she was fairly well off. None of her daguerreotypes are known to have survived, and there are no records of her after the 1852 census.
