= South Mountain (West Kill, New York) =

Mountain in New York, United States

- Location within New York Adirondack Park Location within the United States

Highest point
- Elevation: 2,838 feet (865 m)
- Coordinates: 42°10′56″N 74°28′40″W

Geography
- Location: SE of Halcott Center, New York, U.S.
- Topo map: USGS West Kill

South Mountain is a mountain in Greene County, New York. It is located in the Catskill Mountains southeast of Halcott Center. Brush Ridge is located southwest, and Halcott Mountain is located east of South Mountain.
