= Hedong, Zhuolu County =

Hedong 河东镇
- Town
- Location in Hebei
- Coordinates: 39°52′40″N 115°18′40″E
- Country: People's Republic of China
- Province: Hebei
- Prefecture-level city: Zhangjiakou
- County: Zhuolu
- Village-level divisions: 40 villages
- Elevation: 597 m (1,959 ft)
- Time zone: UTC+8 (China Standard)
- Area code: 0313

Hedong (simplified Chinese: 河东; traditional Chinese: 河東; pinyin: Hédōng; lit. 'river east') is a town of southern Zhuolu County in northwestern Hebei province, located 62 kilometres (39 mi) south of the county seat, 92 km (57 mi) west of central Beijing, and about 110 km (68 mi) southeast of Zhangjiakou as the crow flies. As of 2018, it has 40 villages under its administration.

== See also ==
- List of township-level divisions of Hebei
