= 南山 =

南山, literally "south mountain(s)", may refer to:

- Nanshan (disambiguation) (pinyin: Nánshān) for Chinese places
- Nanzan (disambiguation) for Japanese places
- Namsan (disambiguation) for Korean places
- Minamiyama, a Japanese surname

== See also ==
- South Mountain (disambiguation)
- 山南 (disambiguation)
- Nam Shan (disambiguation)
