= 山南 =

山南 (lit. 'south of the mountain(s)') may refer to:

- Shannan, Tibet (山南), China
- Nanzan or Sannan (山南), a 14th-century Ryukyuan kingdom
- Shannan Circuit, a province under the Tang dynasty
- Sannam-dong (山南洞), an area of Heungdeok District, Cheongju, South Korea

== People with the surname ==
- Yamanami Keisuke (山南 敬助, 1833–1865), Japanese samurai in Kyoto

== See also ==
- 南山 (disambiguation)
- Shannan (disambiguation)
