= Dahenan =

Dahenan 大河南镇
- Town
- Dàhénán Zhèn
- Location in Hebei Location in China
- Coordinates: 39°43′28″N 115°08′51″E
- Country: People's Republic of China
- Province: Hebei
- Prefecture-level city: Zhangjiakou
- County: Zhuolu

Area
  - Total: 246.1 km^{2} (95.0 sq mi)

Population (2010)
  - Total: 10,053
  - Density: 40.85/km^{2} (105.8/sq mi)
- Time zone: UTC+8 (China Standard)

Dahenan (Chinese: 大河南镇; pinyin: Dàhénán Zhèn) is a town located in Zhuolu County, Zhangjiakou, Hebei, China. According to the 2010 census, Dahenan had a population of 10,053, including 5,212 males and 4,841 females. The population was distributed as follows: 1,749 people aged under 14, 7,341 people aged between 15 and 64, and 963 people aged over 65.

== See also ==
- List of township-level divisions of Hebei
