= The Shannons =

Dutch-Irish folk band

The Shannons is a Dutch-Irish folk band from Laag Zuthem, Netherlands, formed by Irishman Noel Shannon and his Dutch wife Lynn Shannon-Harleman. They are the organizers of the Deventer Irish Pubfestival.
