= Minamino =

Minamino (written: 南野 lit. "south plain") is a Japanese surname. Notable people with the surname include:

- Takeshi Minamino (南野 タケシ; born 1985), Japanese professional wrestler
- Takumi Minamino (南野 拓実; born 1995), Japanese footballer
- Yoko Minamino (南野 陽子; born 1967), Japanese idol, singer and actress
- Yume Minamino (南埜 佑芽; born 2011), Japanese artistic gymnast

== Fictional characters ==
- Kanade Minamino (南野 奏), a protagonist of the anime series Suite PreCure
- Mikako Minamino (南野 美果子), a character in the anime series AKB0048

== See also ==
- Minamino Station, a railway station in Shōnai, Yamagata Prefecture, Japan
