= Minamiyama =

Minamiyama (written: 南山, lit. "south mountain") is a Japanese surname. Notable people with the surname include:

- Chiaki Minamiyama (南山 千明, born 1985), Japanese women's footballer
- Makoto Minamiyama (南山 真, born 1973), Japanese basketball player

== See also ==
- 南山 (disambiguation)
