= Wenyu River =

River in China

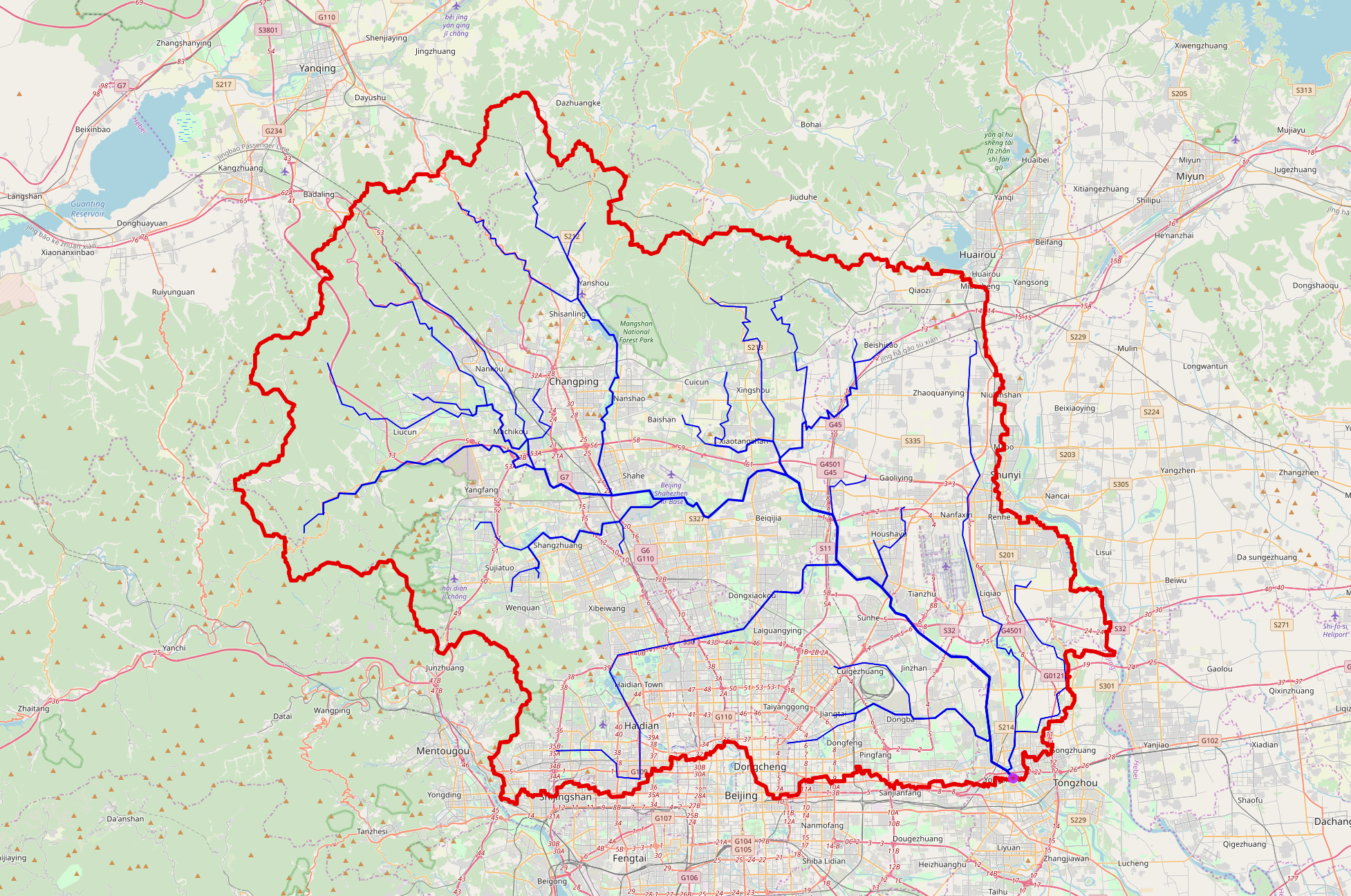
Wenyu river basin

The Wenyu River (Chinese: 温榆河; lit. 'hot springs and elm trees') is a major river in the suburbs of Beijing, belonging to the Hai River basin. It originates from Badaling in the northwest of Beijing and is formed by the confluence of the Dongsha, Beisha, and Nansha rivers, eventually joining the Tonghui River in Tongzhou, to the east of Beijing. Since the Yuan Dynasty (13th-14th centuries), the waterway has been artificially redirected, leading to the abandonment of its natural course downstream of Tongzhou. Since then, all its water flows into the Grand Canal, making it a crucial water source for the northern end of the canal. In modern era, the Wenyu River stretches for 47.4 kilometers and has a drainage area of 2,478 square kilometers. The upper reaches, particularly the Shahe Reservoir, provide irrigation water for the northern suburbs of Beijing.
