= Yongding River =

River in northern China

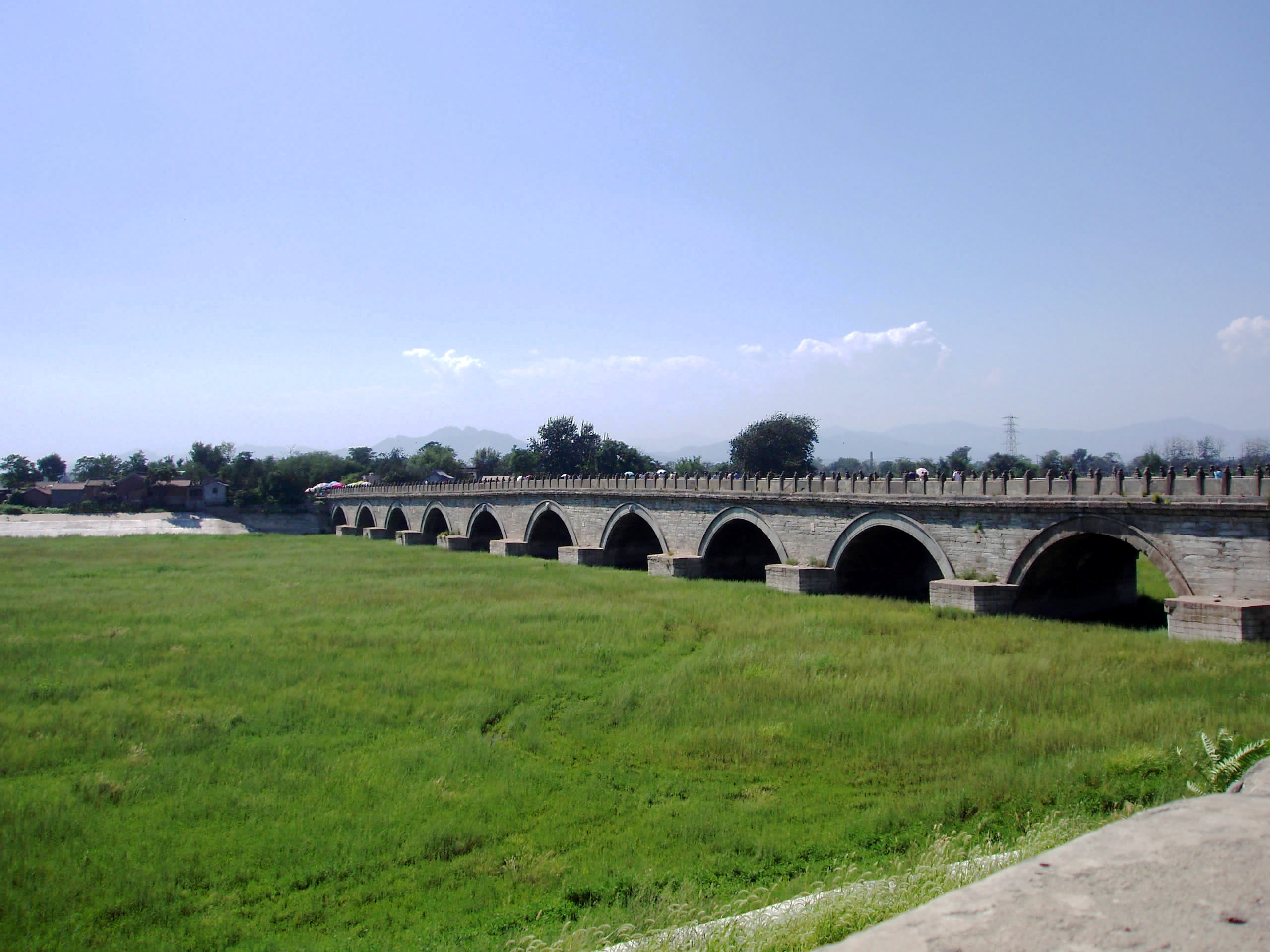
- The Yongding River under the Marco Polo Bridge is dried out

- The Hai River Basin.
- Native name: 永定河 (Chinese)

Physical characteristics
- Source: Guancen Mountains
  - location: Ningwu County, Shanxi Province
- Mouth: Hai River
  - coordinates: 39.1623°N 117.1762°E
- Length: 650 kilometers (400 mi)
- Basin size: 47,016 square kilometers (18,153 sq mi)

Basin features
- Bridges: Marco Polo Bridge

The Yongding River (Chinese: 永定河; pinyin: Yǒngdìng Hé; Wade–Giles: Yungting Ho) is a river in northern China. It is one of the main tributaries in the Hai River system and is the largest river to flow through Beijing. In recent years, the Beijing segment of the river has dried up due to environmental issues. The Beijing municipal government has invested 16 billion yuan in an effort to replace the riverbed with parkland or smaller bodies of water.

== Etymology ==
The river was originally called Wuding River (Chinese: 無定河; pinyin: Wúdìng Hé), literally "unfixed river", because its flow was irregular. When the Kangxi Emperor reigned, he enacted various hydraulic engineering projects in the region to rein in the seasonal flooding. After those projects, the river was renamed to its modern name, which means "ever-fixed river".

== Geography ==
The Yongding River is 650 kilometers (400 mi) in length and drains an area of 47,016 square kilometers (18,153 sq mi). It emerges from the Guancen Mountains (管涔山) in Ningwu County, Shanxi Province, where it is known as the Sanggan River (桑干河) and flows northeast into Inner Mongolia and then heads southeast into Hebei Province.

In Huailai County, it fills the Guanting Reservoir, the biggest reservoir serving Beijing, and takes on the name Yongding. It enters Beijing Municipality through the Xishan Mountains west of the city in Mentougou District and descends into the flatlands of Fengtai and Daxing Districts.

The river eventually flows back into Hebei Province and then on to Tianjin Municipality, where it meets the Hai River just before the latter enters the city and then empties into the Bohai Sea at Tanggu. Part of the river is diverted before the juncture with the Hai, and flows directly into the Bohai Sea. This channel is called the Yongding New River (永定新河).

== History ==
Historically, the river was notorious for its flash floods and course changes. The river has taken at least three major courses through Beijing. According to the earliest historical records, the river originally flowed northeast from Babaoshan toward what is now the Purple Bamboo Park in Haidian District and into Wenyu River.

Western Han dynasty

In the Western Han dynasty, the river flowed south from Deshengmen through what is now downtown Beijing, including Qianmen and Hongqiao and Longtan Lake, before leaving to the southeast. At that time, the city was southwest of today's city center. In the Liao dynasty, the river moved southwest to its present course, and the Lugou Bridge was built over it in 1189. When Marco Polo visited the city during the Yuan dynasty, he crossed the Yongding River on the Lugou Bridge, which became known as the Marco Polo Bridge.

Qing dynasty

The river has been known colloquially as the Wuding River or the "River of Instability." In 1698, the Qing dynasty Kangxi Emperor's government reinforced the river banks and rendered the current course permanent. Thereafter it became known as the Yongding River or the "River of Eternal Stability."

== Gallery ==
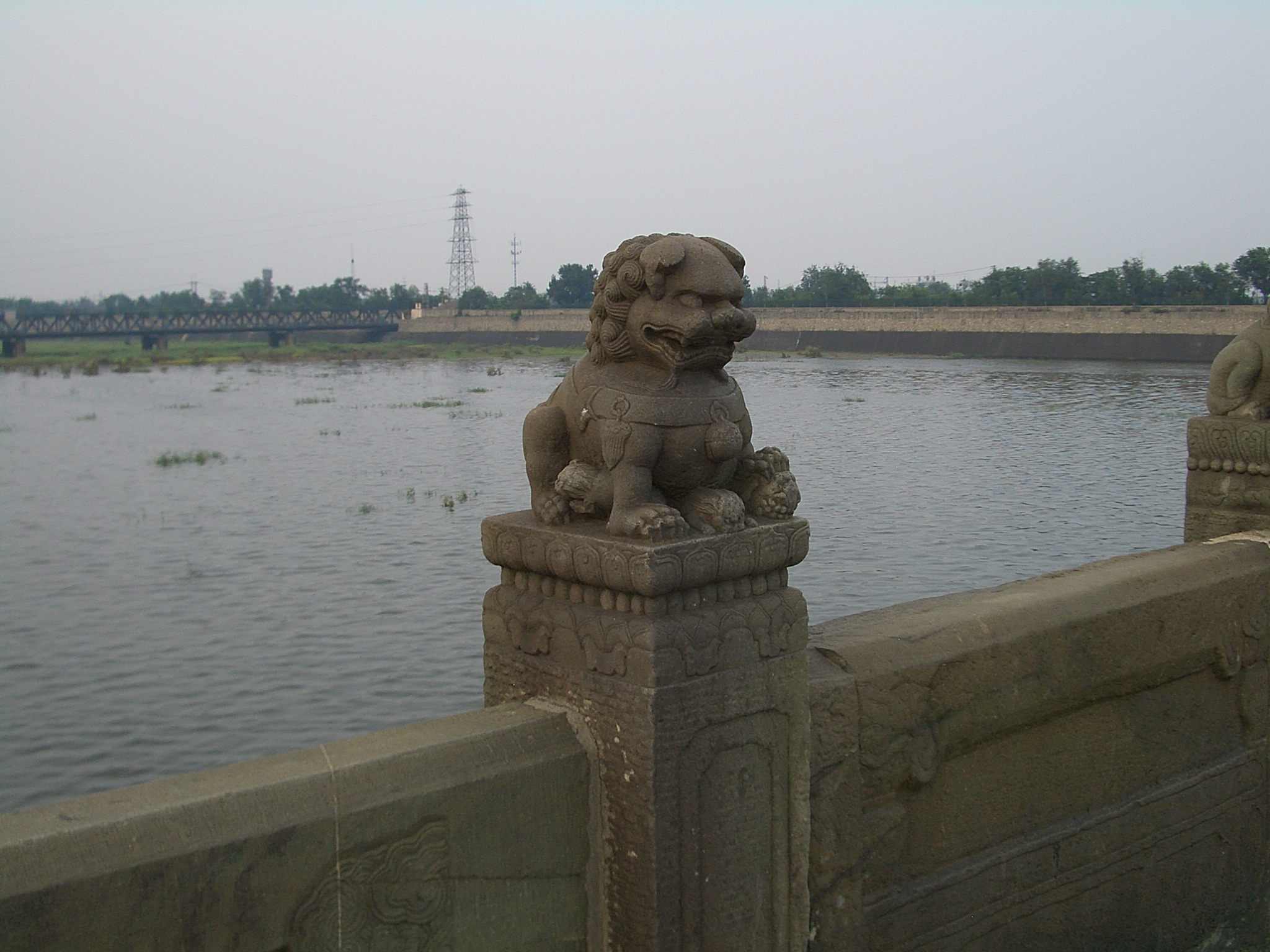
Yongding River in the wet season.

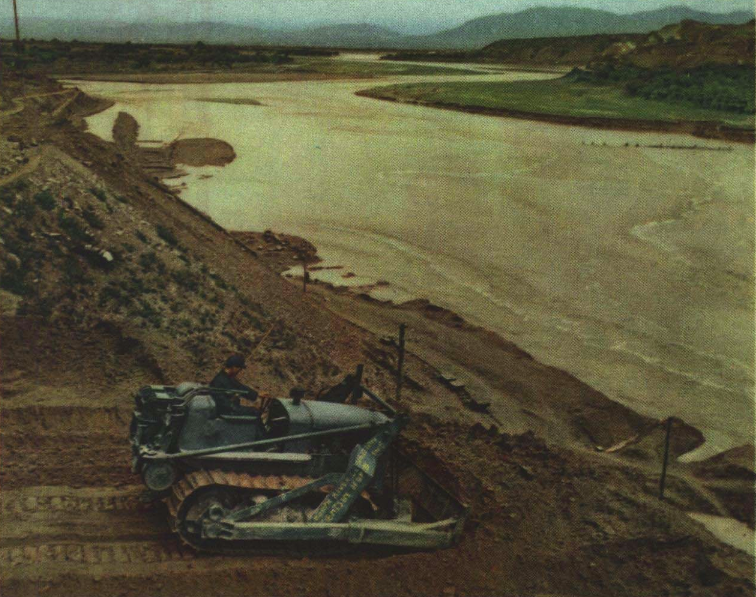
Guanting Reservoir under construction in 1952

== See also ==
- Guanting Hydropower Station
