= Guanting Reservoir =

Reservoir in northern China

Guanting Reservoir 官厅水库
- Location within Beijing Location within China
- Location: at the junction of Beijing and Hebei Province
- Coordinates: 40°23′N 115°48′E
- Type: reservoir
- Basin countries: China
- Built: 13 May 1954

Guanting Reservoir (Chinese: 官厅水库), also known as Guanting Shuiku, is the first large-scale reservoir after the founding of the People's Republic of China.

Guanting Reservoir is located at the junction of Beijing and Hebei Province, mostly in Huailai County, Hebei Province, and a small part in Yanqing County, Beijing. The reservoir is named after the dam built near the Guanting Town (官厅镇).

== History ==
Guanting Reservoir started construction in October 1951 and was completed on 13 May 1954, with the main flow of water being the Yongding River in Huailai. The reservoir covers an area of 230 square kilometers and has a total storage capacity of 2.2 billion cubic meters.

Guanting Reservoir was a major source of fresh water for Beijing and neighboring regions. Due to water contamination, the reservoir was withdrawn from the system to supply Beijing with drinking water in 1997, but after thorough treatment, the reservoir has been an alternate water source since 2007.
