= Hugh Denison =

Australian politician

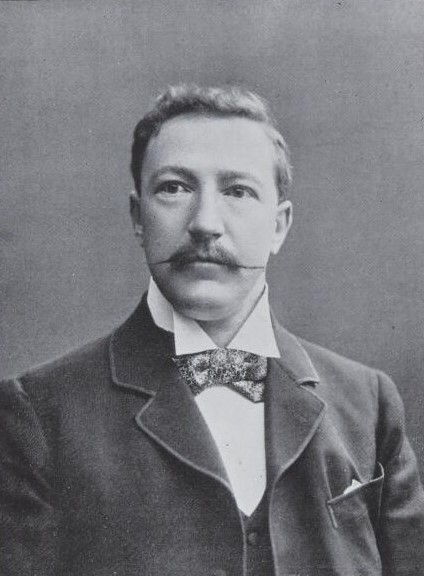

Sir Hugh Robert Denison KBE, originally Hugh Robert Dixson (11 November 1865 – 23 November 1940) was a businessman, parliamentarian and philanthropist in South Australia and later New South Wales. He was a member of the South Australian House of Assembly from 1901 to 1905, representing North Adelaide (1901–1902) and Adelaide (1902–1905). Outside of politics, he was involved in his family's tobacco business, a forerunner of the British-Australasian Tobacco Company, was involved with a number of newspapers, and founded the Macquarie Radio Network. He changed his surname by deed poll in 1907 to avoid confusion with his uncle Sir Hugh Dixson.

== Early life ==
Denison was born the eldest son of Robert Dixson (16 May 1842 – 27 November 1891) and Ruth Dixson (née Whingates) near Forbes, New South Wales. His parents' marriage ended in acrimony, and Robert's will, which left the bulk of his considerable fortune to the University of Melbourne, was contested by his widow and children, and overturned with the university getting around half. Robert Dixson and his brother Sir Hugh Dixson (1841–1926) were partners in Robert Dixson & Co. which manufactured tobacco. Hugh was educated at Scotch College, Melbourne then when his father moved to Adelaide in 1878 to found a tobacco factory there, enrolled at Prince Alfred College. From 1881 to 1883 he studied at University College School, London.

== Business activities ==
=== Tobacco ===
The Dixson tobacco business was founded by Denison's grandfather Hugh Dixson (ca.1810 – 3 November 1880) of George Street, Sydney in 1839. He had been a tobacconist in Hanover Street, Edinburgh. In 1864 he set up a company Dixson & Sons with his two sons Hugh jun. and Robert. Robert Dixson set up his own business in William Street, Melbourne in 1872, taking advantage of a loophole in the acts governing interstate trade. Robert Dixson & Co. set up a factory in Halifax Street, Adelaide in 1877 around the same time as Feldheim, Jacobs and Co. of Melbourne.

He worked for his father from 1885 and in 1889 went to Perth, Western Australia, where he married. On the death of his father in 1891 he bought the South Australian and Western Australian businesses from his father's estate and returned to Adelaide to live.

In 1897 he purchased James Chambers' Montefiore Hill home, which had been the setting-out point for John McDouall Stuart's successful sixth expedition. He pulled down the house and replaced it with a grand residence of Germanic style, which he named "Stalheim" (perhaps named for the town in Norway). In 1908 he sold the property to Langdon Bonython, who renamed it "Carclew", the name by which it is known today.

He then purchased Richard Rouse's "Guntawang", near Gulgong, which he renamed Eumaralla Estate, where he bred thoroughbred horses and Dorset Horn sheep. In 1905 he bought the yearling Poseidon, which subsequently won the Australian Jockey Club Derby and St Leger, the Victoria Derby and the Melbourne Cup and the Caulfield Cup twice. His horse Dark Chief won the Moonee Valley Cup in 1936.

In 1902 the family's separate tobacco interests were merged in the Dixson Tobacco Company. which in 1903 merged with William Cameron Bros & Co, Melbourne, to form the British-Australasian Tobacco Company. Dixson was elected a director and in 1905 moved to Sydney.

=== Media ===
In 1910, Denison as he was now named, founded Sun Newspaper Ltd and took over publication of the Sunday Sun and the Australian Star (renamed The Sun) with Montague Grover as editor-in-chief. In 1922 his company set up in Melbourne and published the Sun News-Pictorial and the Evening Sun but sold the business in 1925.

In 1929 he formed Associated Newspapers Limited, with S. Bennett Limited and Sun Newspapers and Daily Telegraph Pictorial Limited, which he had acquired in December 1927. Associated Newspapers bought the Sunday Guardian and Daily Guardian from Joynton Smith.

Denison took a keen interest in wireless: in 1909 he was a director of the AWA, which constructed Australia's first two coastal wireless stations under contract to the Commonwealth. The involvement of the German Telefunken firm in the otherwise Australian business, was controversial in the lead up to World War I. Australasian Wireless in 1913 merged into AWA, which firm dominated Australian broadcasting and radiocommunications for the next half century. Another controversy involving Denison was the circumstances of the transition of Australasian Wireless Limited to Australasian Wireless Company Limited. Denison was managing director of AWA until Ernest Fisk took over the role in 1917.

He was a director of National Productions which produced the 1936 movie The Flying Doctor.

In 1936 he purchased a controlling interest in 2GB and founded the Broadcasting Service Association (BSA), which in 1938 became the Macquarie Radio Network, which controlled fifteen radio stations across Australia.

== Politics ==
He was on the Adelaide City Council from 1888 to 1889, representing the Gawler Ward.

On 1 June 1901 he was elected to the South Australian House of Assembly for North Adelaide. From 1902 to 1905 he was a South Australian House of Assembly member for Adelaide.

== Family ==
He married Sara Rachel Fothergill (ca.1869 – 3 September 1949) at Fremantle, Western Australia on 26 April 1893. They had three sons:

- Reginald Ernest Denison BA LLB (29 November 1894 – 1975) married Beatrice Marshall in 1923. He was an executive with Sun Newspapers.
- Cecil Herbert Denison (9 January 1896 – ) was a grazier and horse breeder at Coonamble
- Leslie Arthur Denison (17 December 1897 – ) married Jean Raine in 1927. He was a production manager at Sun Newspapers.

Denison died of cancer on 23 November 1940 while on a visit to Melbourne, and was cremated.

== Interests ==
He was a fine baritone and sang in the choir of St Peter's Cathedral, Adelaide.

He was a keen sportsman; apart from horse racing he was interested in rowing, cricket, football, bowls and golf. He was a member of the Royal Sydney Golf Club.

== Philanthropy ==
Denison gave £10,000 to the Dreadnought Fund in 1910. The original purpose of Dreadnought Fund (which attracted large donations from such wealthy businessmen as George Henry Bosch and Samuel McCaughey) was intended to purchase a battleship for the Royal Navy, but eventually was used to establish the Royal Australian Naval College.

He was a major sponsor of Douglas Mawson's Australasian Antarctic Expedition.

During World War I he subscribed generously to government war loans and the Australian Red Cross Society.

In 1919 he gave £25,000 to the Royal Colonial Institute in London, which in 1927 became the Royal Empire Society. He helped to found its New South Wales branch and paid for its headquarters in Bligh Street. He served as president in 1921–26, 1932–38 and 1939–40.

He contributed generously to the Returned Sailors and Soldiers Imperial League of Australia and helped finance its newspaper Reveille.

He left part of his estate, valued for probate at £203,602, to the Sir Hugh Denison Foundation and St Paul's College in the University of Sydney, and to the Church of England Homes at Carlingford.

== Recognition ==
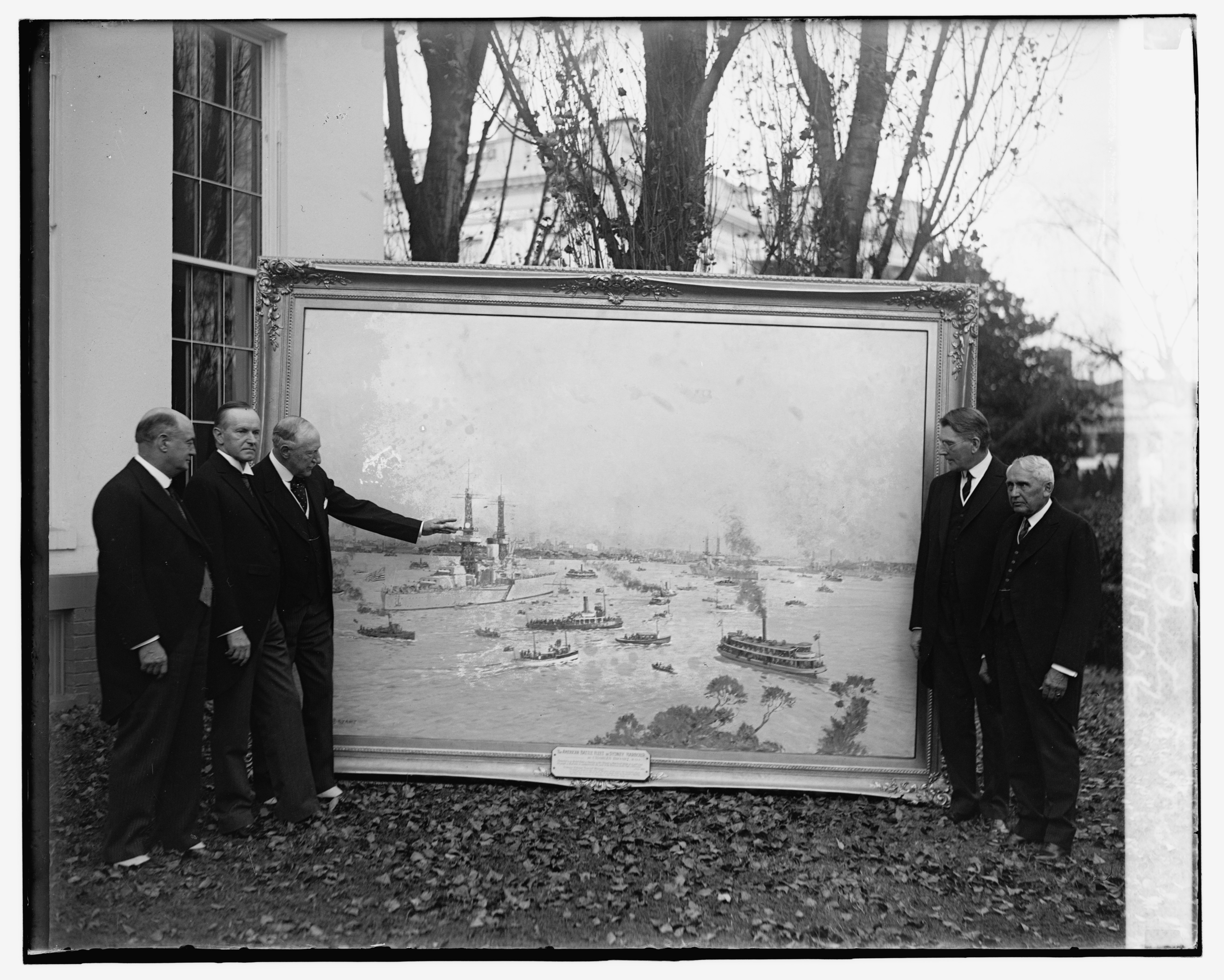
Denison (outstretched hand) presenting a gift from Australia to Calvin Coolidge

He was appointed Knight Commander of The Order of the British Empire (K.B.E.) in 1923 and as Sir Hugh represented New South Wales at the British Empire Exhibition in London during 1924–25.

In 1926–28, he was appointed Commissioner for Australia in the United States of America, but had limited influence by his lack of diplomatic status, and strongly urged Prime Minister Bruce to establish an Australian legation in Washington.

Cape Denison in Antarctica was named for him, recognising his substantial contribution to the Australasian Antarctic Expedition and the provision of the majority of the expedition's wireless telegraphy equipment by his Australasian Wireless which was deployed at Cape Denison (then known as Adelie Land) and Macquarie Island. The former location was the first wireless telegraphy facility in Antarctica.

== See also ==
- Hundred of Dixson

== References and sources ==
Sources

- Walker, R. B. "Denison, Sir Hugh Robert (1865–1940)". Australian Dictionary of Biography. National Centre of Biography, Australian National University. ISBN 978-0-522-84459-7. ISSN 1833-7538. OCLC 70677943.
