= Macquarie Chest =

19th century Australian artefact

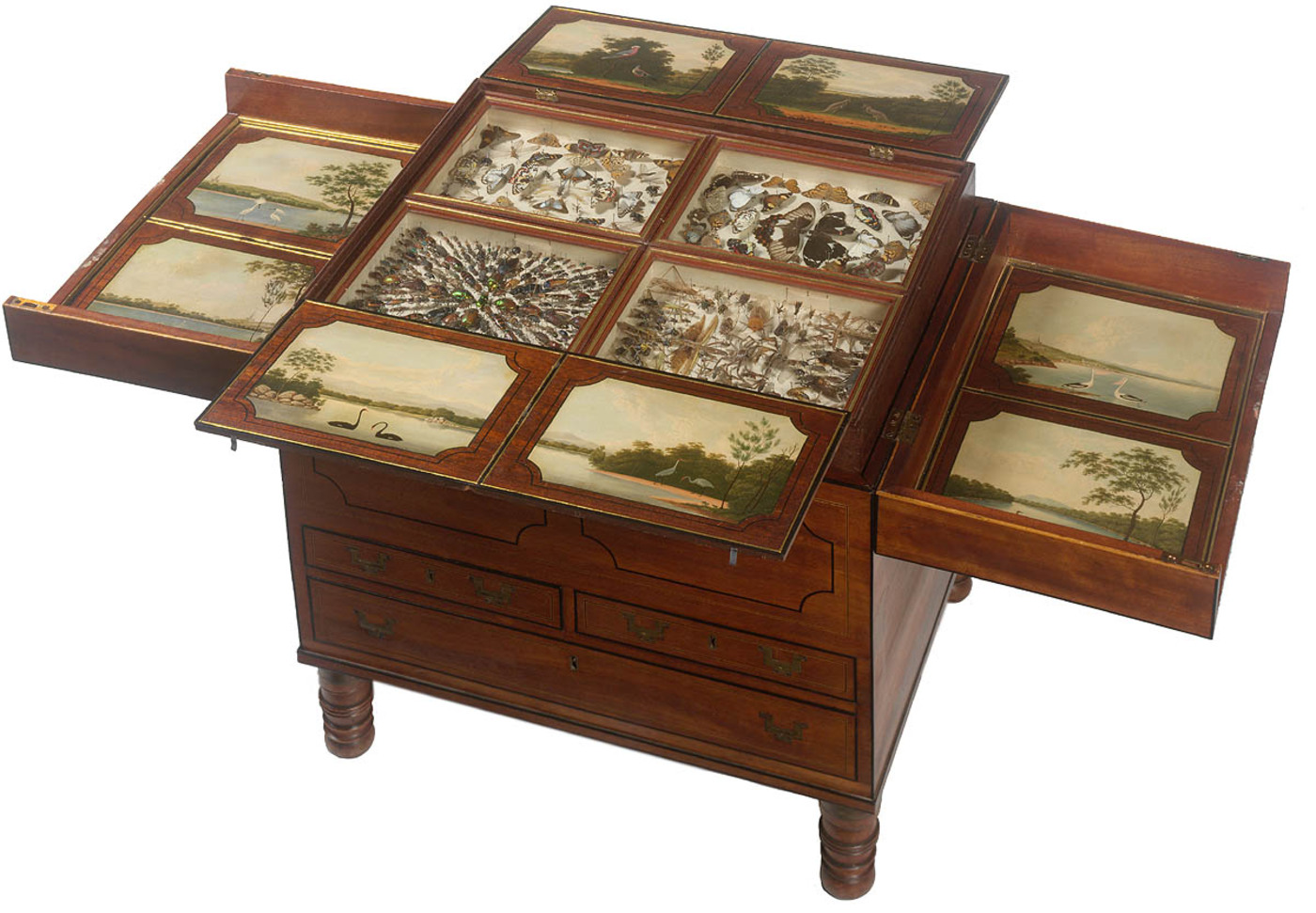
The Macquarie Chest

The Macquarie Chest (also known as the Strathallan Chest) is an early 19th century wooden chest, with provenance traced to Newcastle, New South Wales, as well as to Governor Lachlan Macquarie. The Chest displays natural history specimens and contains twelve panels painted by convict artist Joseph Lycett, eight of the panels show views of Newcastle. The Chest was most likely completed in August 1818 and given to Governor Macquarie and Mrs Macquarie as a gift. The Chest was purchased by William Dixson in London in 1937. The Chest is part of the collection of the State Library of New South Wales.
