= Sydney - Capital New South Wales =

c. 1800 painting

Sydney - Capital New South Wales, c 1800
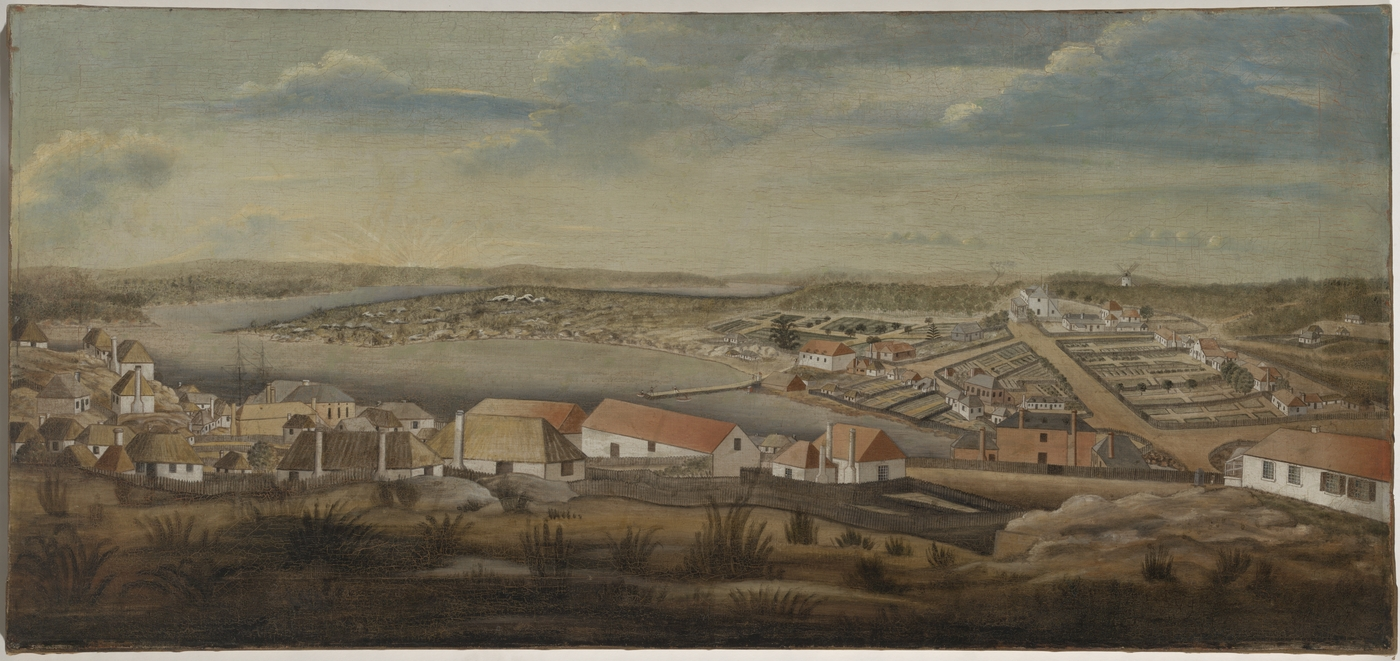
- Sydney - Capital New South Wales, ca.1800
- Material: oil on canvas
- Size: 62 x 136 cm (inside frame 73.5 x 146 cm)
- Created: c. 1800
- Present location: State Library of New South Wales

Sydney - Capital New South Wales, c. 1800, is in the collection of the State Library of New South Wales, located in Sydney, New South Wales, Australia. It is one of the first oil paintings depicting Sydney town from what is now East Circular Quay.

== Description ==
The full title on the frame of the painting reads: Sydney - Capital New South Wales - founded by Governor Phillip - named after Lord Sydney Secretary for the Colonies: 1788. The oil painting measures 62 x 136 cm, and inside its frame 73.5 x 146 cm.

Standing on the west side of Sydney Cove, looking towards the Heads, Sydney town's success is reflected in the buildings and carefully laid out gardens. On the right of the painting on what is now Bridge Street, are the homes and offices of Government administrators, with the two-storeyed Government House, now the site of the Museum of Sydney.

== Historical information ==
=== Location history ===
Sydney – Capital New South Wales was painted around 1800, most likely in England from drawings made in Sydney, possibly from sketches by Thomas Watling .

=== Acquisition ===
The painting was purchased from the estate of Viscount Sydney in 1915 by Sir William Dixson. Dixson then presented the painting to the State Library of NSW in 1929.

== Artist ==
The association of this painting with Thomas Watling has long been debated. Arguments for and against Watling being the artist of the works were published in the Bulletin, April 30, June 4, and June 18, 1977, and October 17, 1978, and in First views of Australia 1788-1825 : a history of early Sydney.

Thought by Sir William Dixson, writing before the version now owned by AGSA came into public view, to be the original of Blake's View 1802. The painting appears in size and style to be a companion picture to Sydney Cove looking to the west, ca. 1800 (ML443). Notes on a comparison of the two paintings, and their provenance, dating and attribution to Watling are in the Mitchell Library at PXn 264. The paintings are now not attributed directly to Watling but are thought to be painted in Britain, by an unknown artist, possibly from Watling's on-the-spot sketches.

== See also ==
- Australian Art
