= Palazzo Rossi Poggi Marsili =

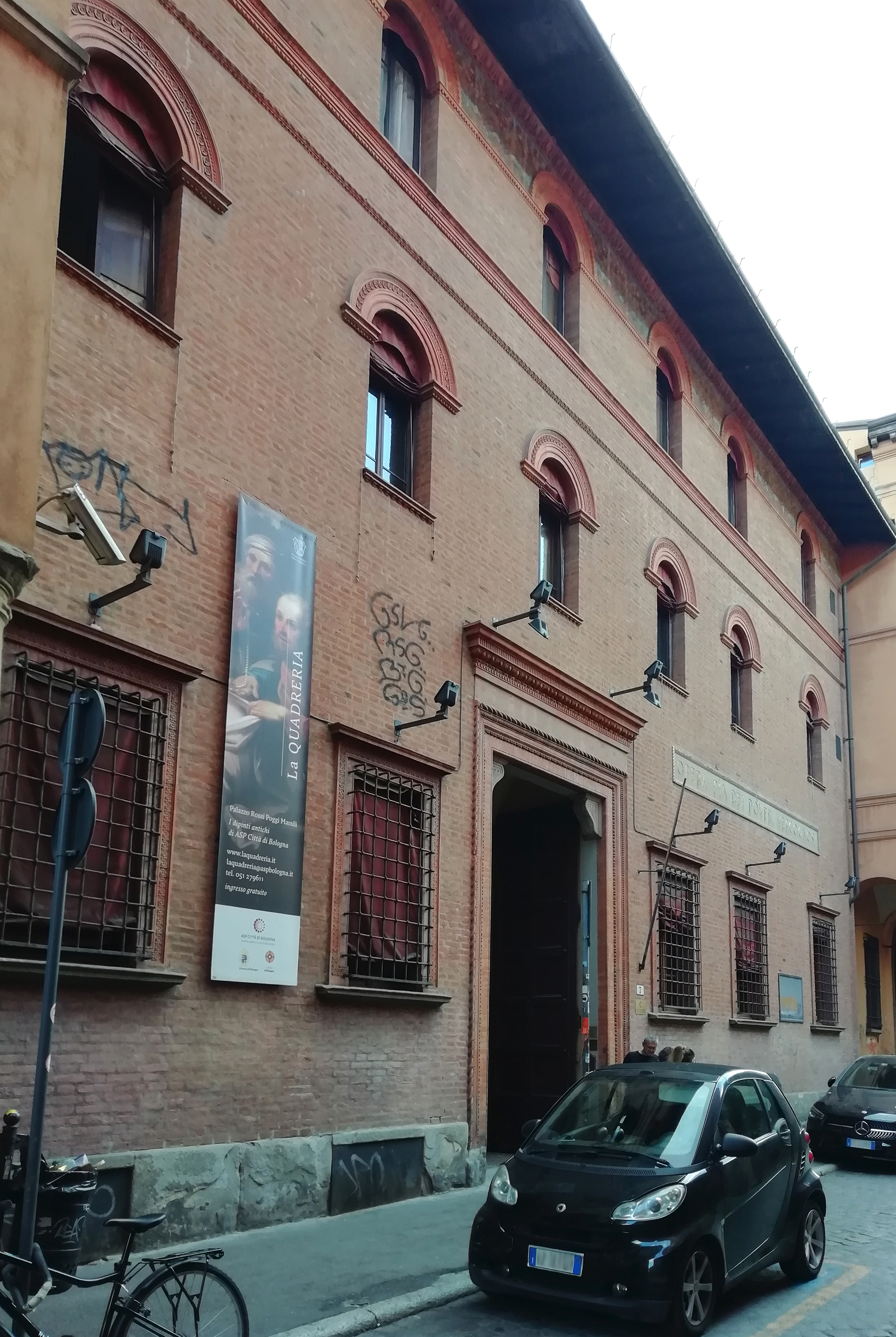

- Location within Italy

General information
- Type: Palace
- Location: Via Marsala #7, Bologna, Italy
- Coordinates: 44.496521°N 11.351129°E

The Palazzo Rossi Poggi Marsili is a palazzo in Via Marsala #7, Bologna, Italy. It was once home of the Opera Pia dei Poveri Vergognosi or Charity home for the Shameful Poor, but now houses a Quadreria or painting gallery gathered by "ASP Città di Bologna", which derived from the joining of various charities.

== History ==
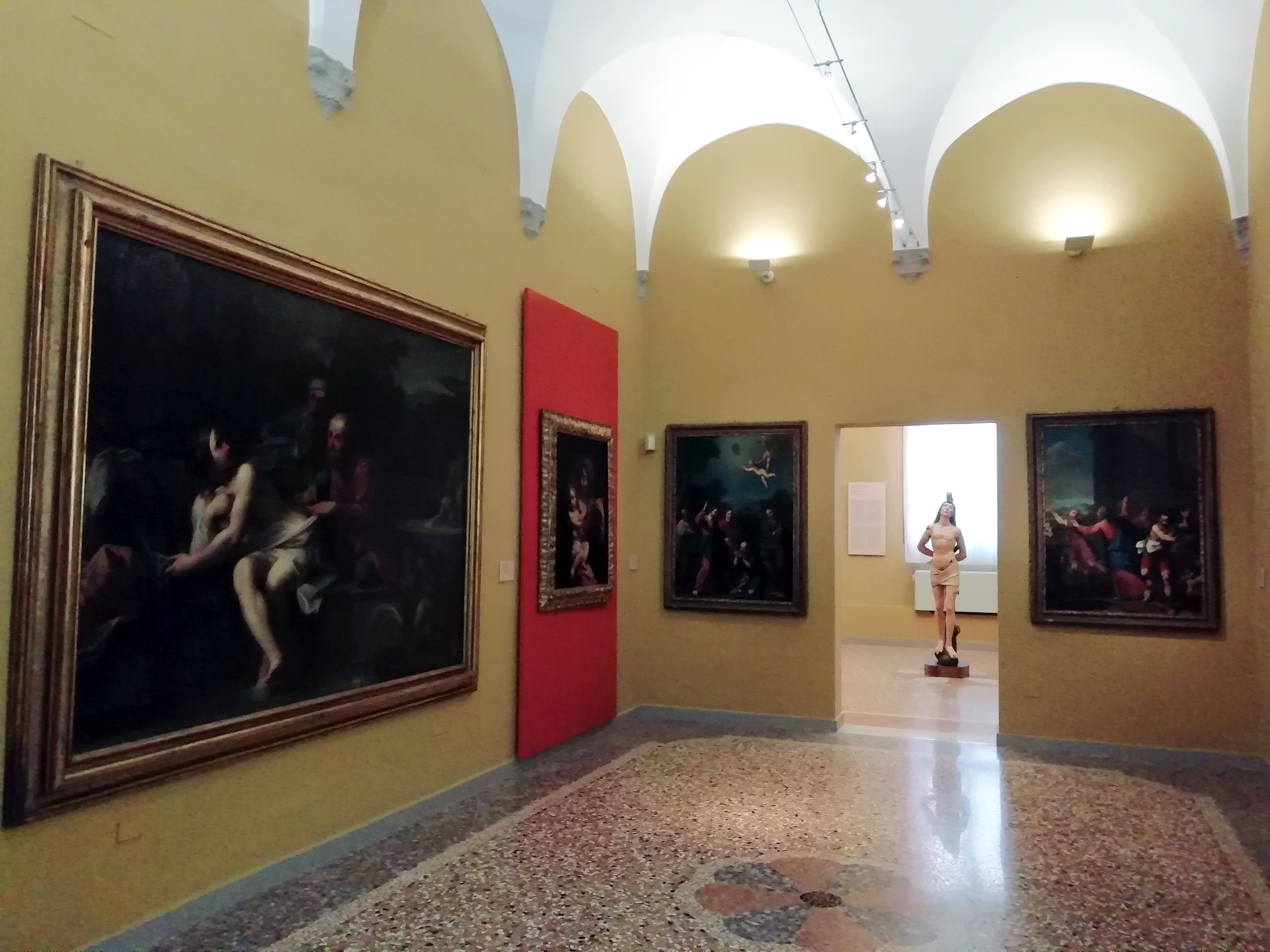
The Quadreria

The Quadreria di Via Marsala was inaugurated on 24 November 2016 and displays over 50 works. The eight rooms on the first-floor display works from the 16th through 18th centuries. They include works by Denys Calvaert, Marc Antonio Franceschini, and Bartolomeo Ramenghi.

The Stanza del Gandolfi, has seven canvases depicting saints by Ubaldo Gandolfi, commissioned between 1768 and 1776 by the Marchese Gregorio Filippo Maria Casali Bentivoglio Paleotti, and donated to the Confraternita del Baraccano.

The museum includes a map room with maps. The four maps include works originally by Frederick de Wit (Nova totvs terrarvm orbis tabvula), engraved in Bologna by Carlo Scotti (engraver), and a view of four continents by Willem Janszoon Blaeu (Nova et acvrata Totivs ...Tabvula with Europea, Asiae, Africae and Americae, engraved by Pietro Todeschi. Both were printed by Giuseppe Longhi.

On display is also a Foundling Wheel used to deposit abandoned children.
