= AWA Tower =

Heritage-listed building in Sydney, Australia

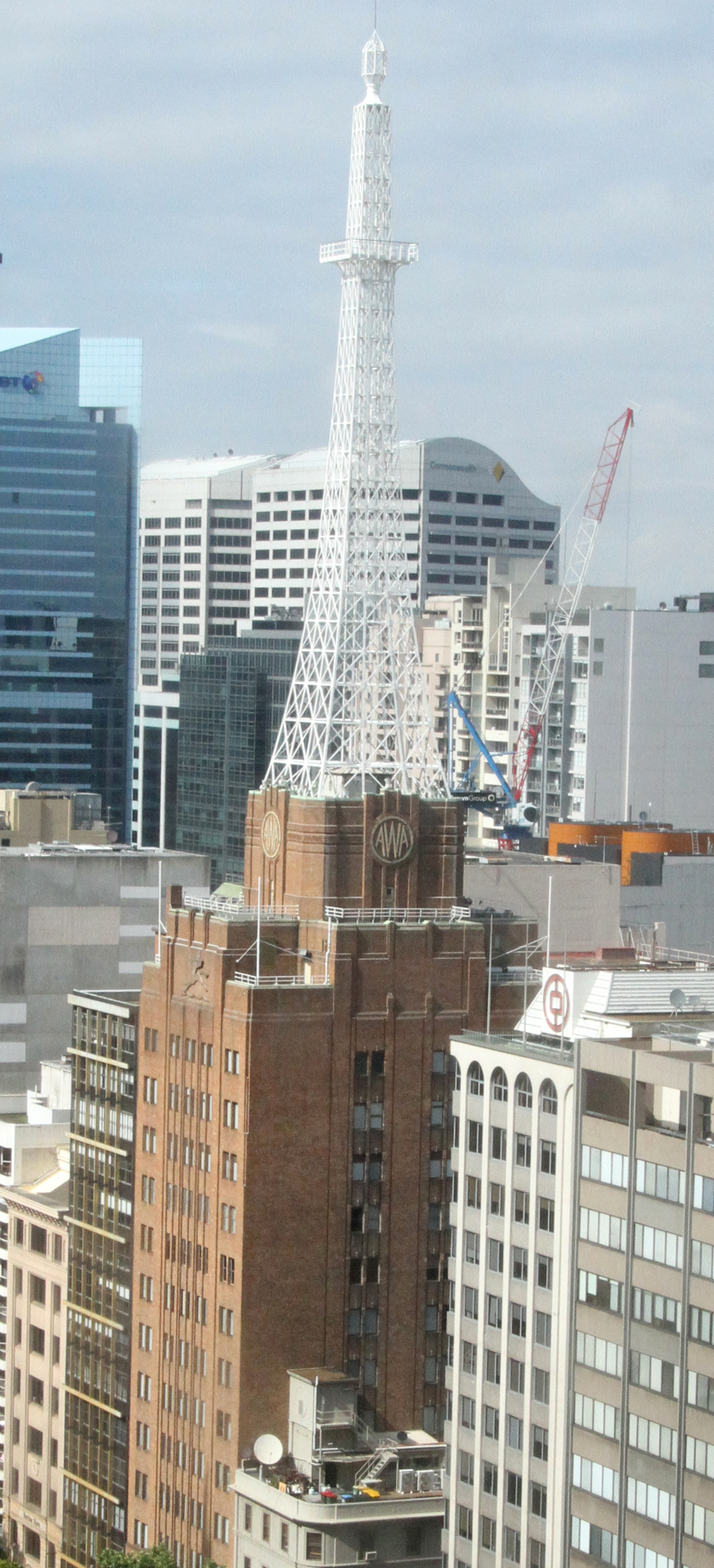
- The AWA Tower viewed from the east end of Wynyard Street

- Location within Sydney

General information
- Architectural style: Inter-war Art Deco
- Location: 45-47 York Street, Sydney, New South Wales, Australia
- Coordinates: 33°52′01″S 151°12′20″E
- Named for: AWA
- Construction started: 1937
- Completed: 1939

Height
- Architectural: 112.5 metres (369 ft)

Technical details
- Floor count: 14

Design and construction
- Architecture firm: Morrow and Gordon
- Engineer: Robertson, Marks and McCredie

New South Wales Heritage Register
- Official name: AWA Building and Tower; Beam Wireless (former major sign on tower)
- Type: state heritage (built)
- Criteria: a., c., d.
- Designated: 2 April 1999
- Reference no.: 665
- Type: Telecommunications Facility
- Category: Postal and Telecommunications
- Builders: William Hughes and Co

The AWA Tower, also referred to as the AWA Building, is a heritage-listed office and communications complex in Sydney, New South Wales, Australia, built for AWA. The AWA Tower consists of a radio transmission tower and a 14-storey building, standing at an overall height of 112.5 metres (369 ft). It is located in the Sydney central business district at 45–47 York Street, close to Wynyard Park and Wynyard railway station. Designed by Robertson, Marks and McCredie in association with DT Morrow and Gordon and built from 1937 to 1939 by William Hughes and Co. Pty Ltd, the AWA Tower was Australia's tallest building from 1939 until the construction of the 115-metre-tall (377 ft) AMP Building, Sydney, in 1962. It was added to the New South Wales State Heritage Register on 2 April 1999.

== History ==
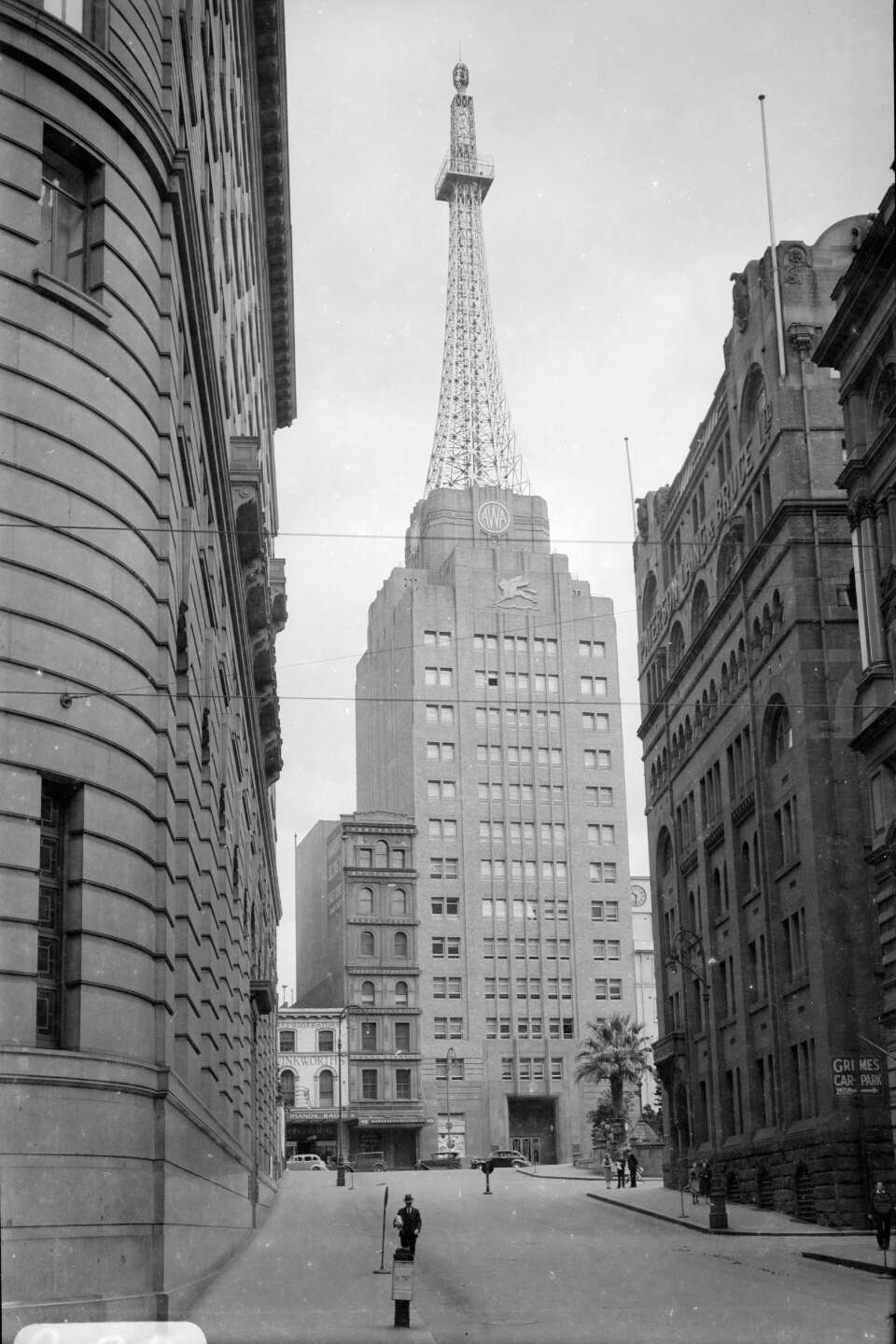
The AWA Tower from Wynyard Street in 1939

The AWA Tower was designed by architects Morrow and Gordon from 1937–1939 and became one of the most notable commercial buildings of Sydney. It brought geometric Art Deco design and modernism to the city skyline with polished trachyte facing at ground level intending to signal a progressive and go-ahead firm. The 1939 steel-framed brick building was designed by Robertson, Marks and McCredie. The tower was modelled on Berlin's Funkturm Tower, built a few years earlier, and both took inspiration from the Eiffel Tower in Paris. The communications tower was an integral part of the structure and remained the tallest structure in Sydney (other than the Sydney Harbour Bridge) until the 1960s. The tower is 46 metres (151 ft) high atop a 55-metre (180 ft) high building. The tower was 48 metres (157 ft), and at the 97-metre (318 ft) point of the building there was a viewing platform.

The building is decorated with appropriate symbols of communication, including a winged Pegasus, said to be chosen by Sir Ernest Fisk, the pioneer of wireless technology and a founding director of AWA. For many years, the tower wore the sign "Beam Wireless", a service providing radio contact to commercial shipping on the England–Australia route introduced in 1927.

AWA was the first to manufacture televisions in Australia, and in the 1960s large AWA neon logos were attached to the building to symbolise this fact. In later years, the company expanded into a wide range of electronic products, including gaming systems. In 2000, when the company folded, the building was sold to Jupiter's Casino Group. It is covered by a conservation order, and remains known as the AWA building, although the big red AWA signs have been removed. The tower, which was demolished and rebuilt in 1994, remains illuminated at night, but the viewing platform has long been gone.

The tower (featuring the AWA logo) features in the science fiction film The Matrix; when Neo and Trinity rescue Morpheus from the agents, the AWA Tower can be seen below as they make their escape by helicopter.

== Description ==
The building comprises 12 office floors, a ground floor and basement. The frontage along York Street is 18.3 metres (60 ft) and 21.3 metres (70 ft) along York Lane. The building is surmounted by a steel-latticed tower which gives the building an overall height of 112.5 metres (369 ft) above street level. The building is steel framed and faced in brick with polished trachyte facing at the ground floor.

The tower was the tallest building in Sydney and Australia until the construction of the AMP Building (115 metres (377 ft)) in 1962.

The building is vertically modelled to give a skyscraper appearance. A Pegasus is depicted in relief sculpture on a plain brick parapet at the top of the building. Pegasus, a winged horse, was chosen by Sir Ernest Fisk as a suitable association with the work of Australia's great wireless undertaking. The building retains the original Fisk system of double glazed windows. The communications tower was designed as an integral part of the building and its supports are part of the structure of the building.

The York Street Entry Foyer and Lift Lobby is faced with Wombeyan Russet marble with simple Art Deco streamlined detail and the letter AWA over the entrance. The former Vestibule (main ground floor) interior retains its silver ash timber panelling. Above the panelling there is a series of symbolic plaster reliefs executed by Otto Steen. Three reliefs constitute three "themes". In each corner are figures representing the four ancient elements - earth, water, fire and air. Over the entrance surrounding an AWA symbol are the signs of the zodiac. A series of small reliefs along the north and south walls represent various nations, symbolising the unification of the world throughout radio. The former Entrance Lobby interior retains a map of the world incised into the polished trachyte wall above the auditorium doors.

Other significant interiors include the fifth floor Boardroom, ancillary offices and executive bathroom. White Elevators Pty Ltd, located in Alexandria, fabricated, installed and maintained the lifts.

=== Construction of AWA Tower Building 1938–1939 ===
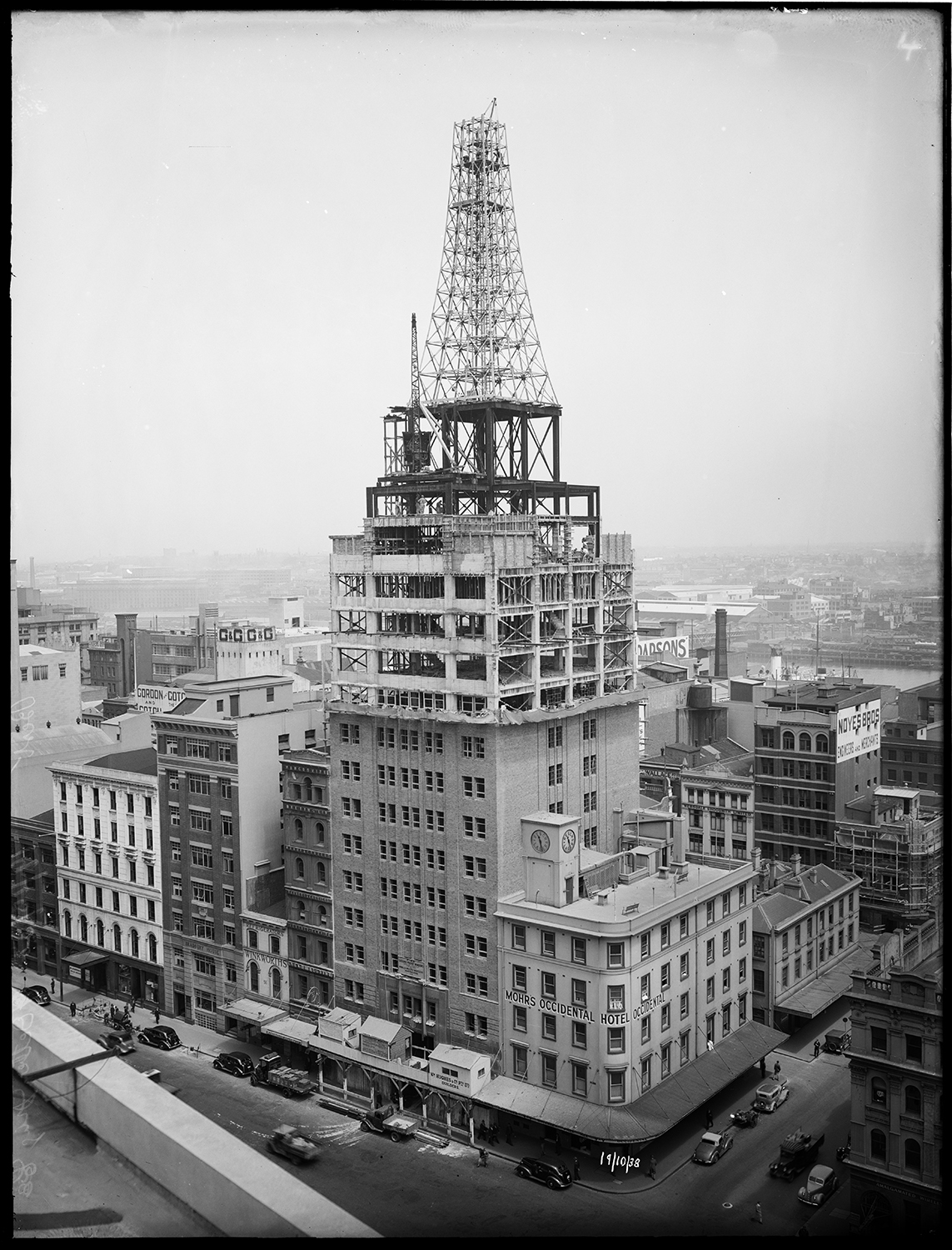
Construction of the AWA Building and Tower, 19 October 1938, Arthur Ernest Foster

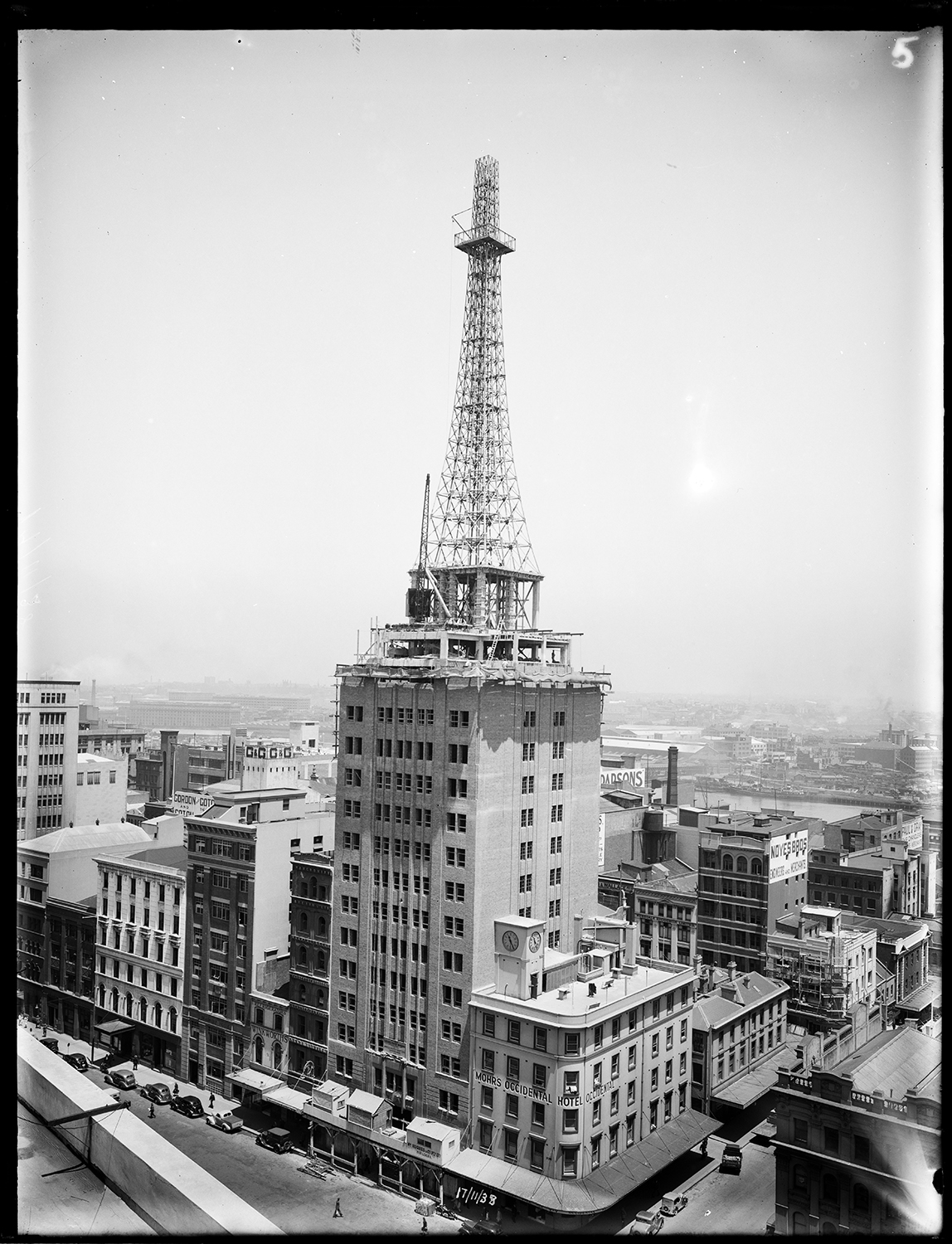
Construction of the AWA Building and Tower, 17 November 1938, Arthur Ernest Foster

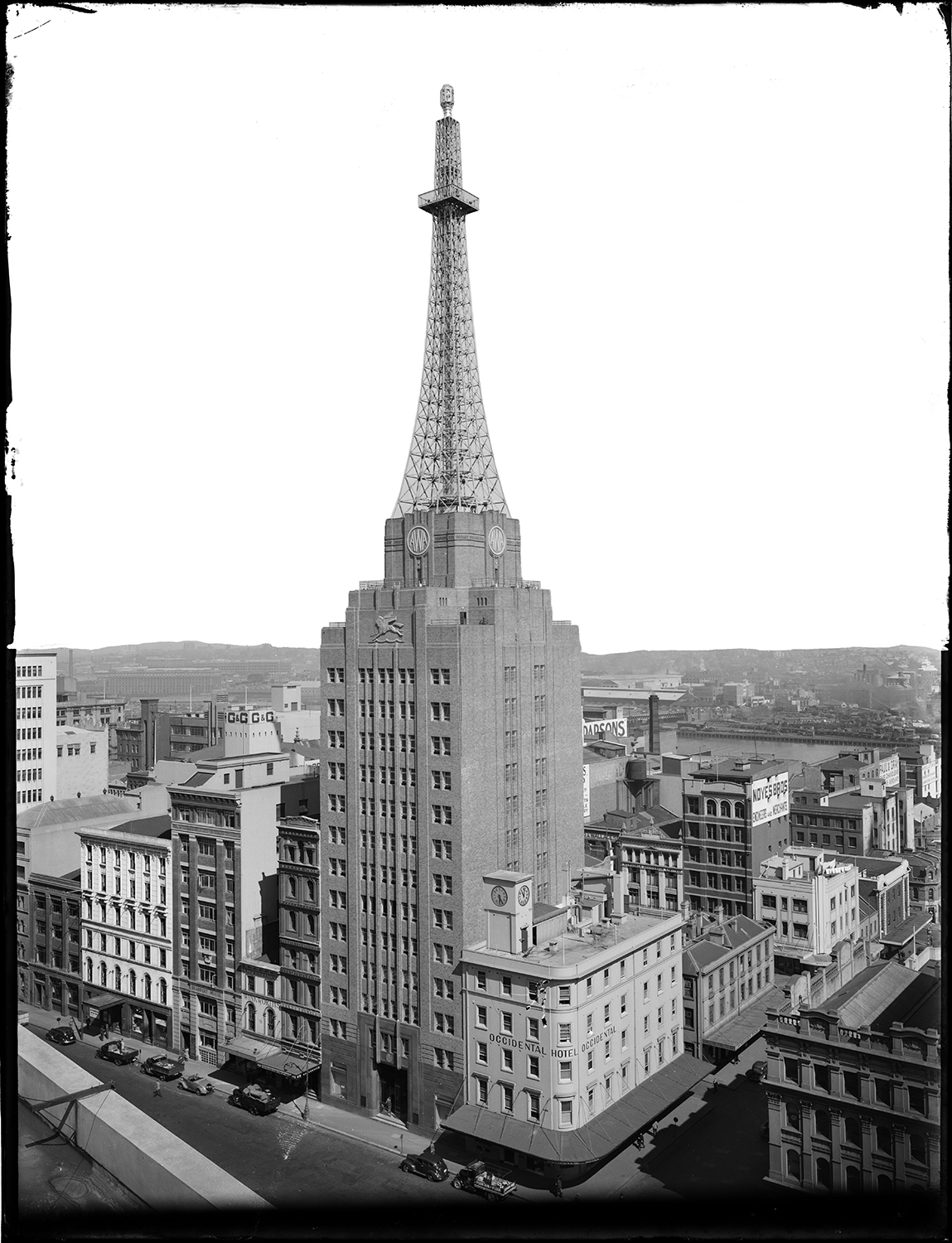
Construction of the AWA Building and Tower, c. February 1939, Arthur Ernest Foster

=== Condition ===
As at 21 November 2002, physical condition is excellent. Archaeological potential is low.

=== Modifications and dates ===
- 1937 - construction began
- 1939 - construction completed

== Heritage listing ==
The AWA Building and Tower is of significance for its important associations with radio and communication technology. It is a simple vertically emphasised skyscraper which represents the epitome of the 1930s desire to integrate architecture with technology.

AWA Tower was listed on the New South Wales State Heritage Register on 2 April 1999 having satisfied the following criteria.

The place is important in demonstrating the course, or pattern, of cultural or natural history in New South Wales.

AWA Building and Tower is of historical significance because for over twenty years it was the tallest structure in Sydney and the building and tower still are an important landmark today.

The place is important in demonstrating aesthetic characteristics and/or a high degree of creative or technical achievement in New South Wales.

AWA Building and Tower is aesthetically significant because it is a simple vertical "emphasised" skyscraper which represents the epitome of the 1930s desire to integrate architecture with technology. It is part of a significant group of Art Deco office buildings located along York Street between Margaret and King Street.

The place has a strong or special association with a particular community or cultural group in New South Wales for social, cultural or spiritual reasons.

AWA Building and Tower is socially significant because of its association with the development of the radios and communications technology and industry.

== See also ==
- Architecture of Sydney
- Tokyo Tower
