= British-Australasian Tobacco Company =

Australian tobacco manufacturer

- Industry: Tobacco
- Headquarters: Australia

The British-Australasian Tobacco Company Limited was an Australian tobacco manufacturer with offices in Sydney and Melbourne.

The company was formed by a merger of the Dixson Tobacco Company Limited and William Cameron Brothers and Company Proprietary. Sir William Dixson was company director from 1903–1908.

The company seems to have still been operating under this name in 1942 but later became part of the W.D. & H.O. Wills (Australia) Group.

== Dixson Tobacco Company ==
Founded by Hugh Dixson (born 1810 in Edinburgh), who migrated to Sydney in 1839 and set up a tobacco business shortly after arrival. By 1864, the firm incorporated his sons and became Dixson & Sons, rapidly expanding under the leadership of Sir Hugh Dixson (b.1841) and his brother Robert Dixson The company pioneered twist tobacco, importing raw leaf (mostly from Virginia) and processing it locally. This business capitalized on tariff advantages, turning raw leaf into hand-rolled products domestically In 1883, a new "Conqueror Tobacco Works" industrial complex was built in Sydney (Castlereagh & Elizabeth Streets), featuring a flat roof for drying tobacco leaf and employing dozens of skilled rollers Premises in other cities followed, including a four-storey factory in Brisbane—overseeing production, drying, and packaging. By the late 1890s, the firm had offices and factories in Sydney, Melbourne, Brisbane, Adelaide, and Fremantle The company issued branded products such as Dixson’s Yankee Doodle flake tobacco, which became collectible long after operations ceased

== In popular culture ==
The tobacco tins produced by the British-Australasian Tobacco Company, constructed from tin-plated, thin, rolled steel, are now collectable items.

== See also ==
- Tobacco in Australia
