= AWA Technology Services =

Australian telecommunications manufacturer

- Industry: Telecommunications
- Founded: 1909; 117 years ago as Amalgamated Wireless'
- Headquarters: Sydney, New South Wales
- Key people: Sir Hugh Denison (chairman); Ernest Fisk, General and Technical Manager
- Products: Specialist and consumer electronics, broadcasting services
- Website: www.awa.com.au

AWA Technology Services, formerly named Amalgamated Wireless (Australasia) Ltd, is an Australian communications technology company. Throughout most of the twentieth century, AWA was Australia's largest and most prominent electronics organisation, undertaking development, manufacture and distribution of radio, telecommunications, television and audio equipment as well as broadcasting services.

After the sell-off of most of its assets and operating divisions, AWA is now primarily an information and communications technology (ICT) service provider.

== History ==
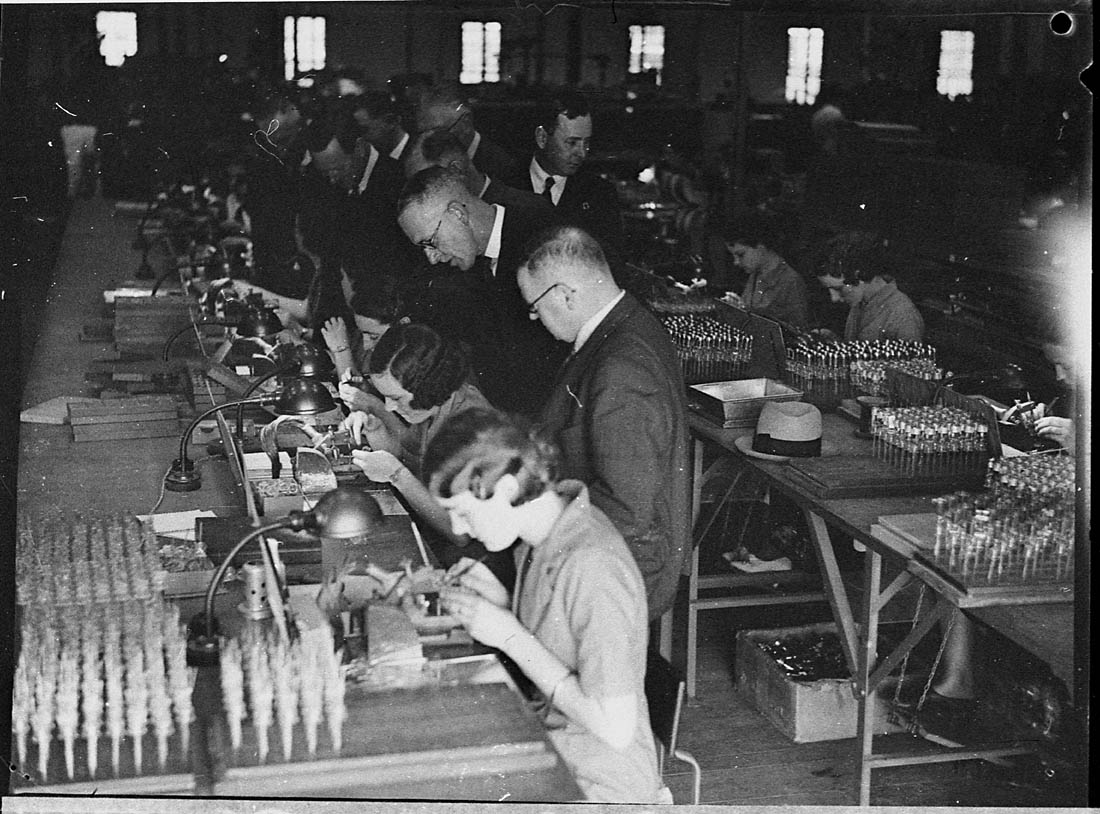
Workers at AWA's factory, Ashfield in 1936

=== Pre-World War II ===
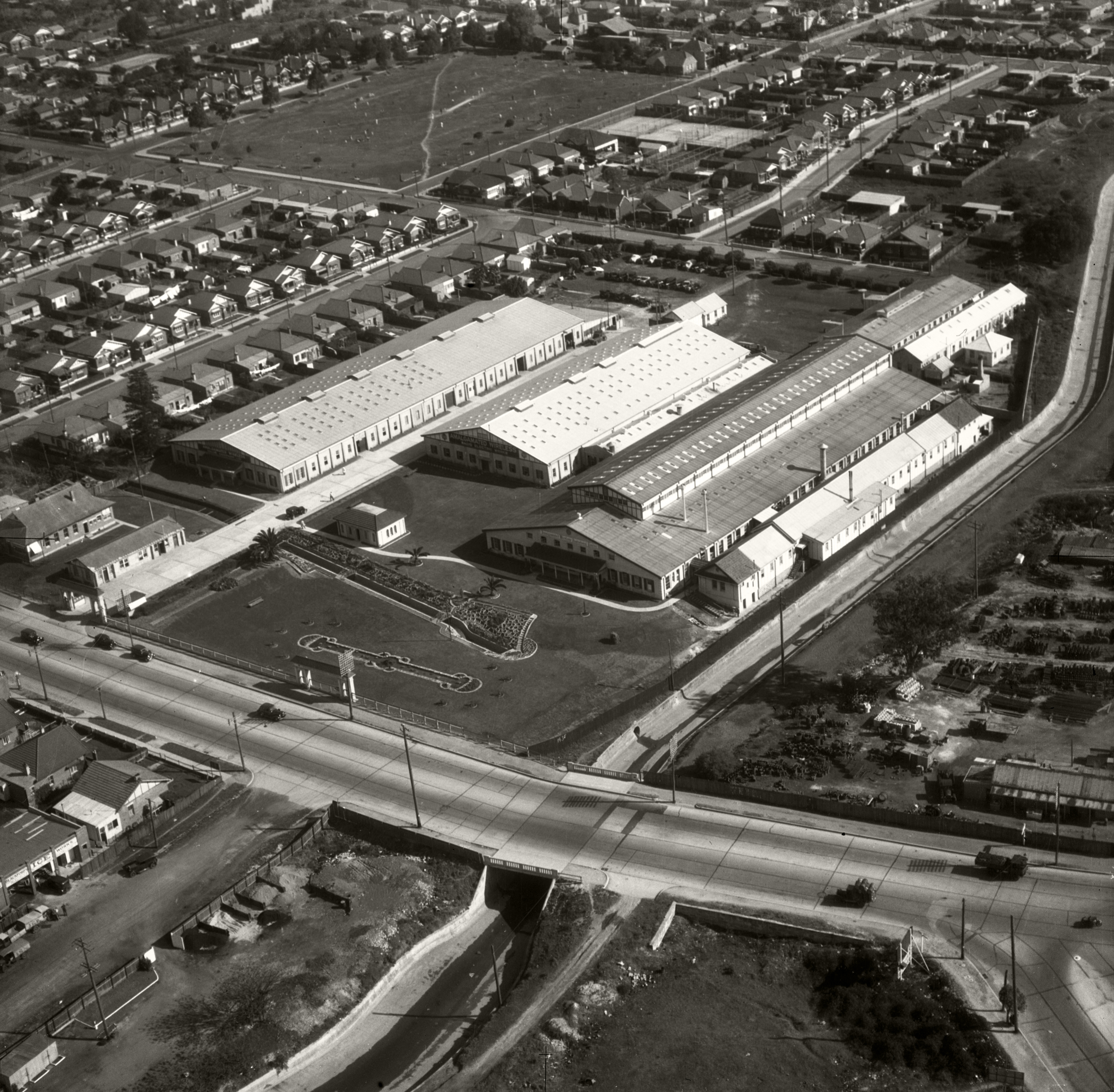
Aerial view of the Amalgamated Wireless Factory in Burwood in 1935.

The company commenced operations in 1909 as Australasian Wireless Limited (AWL), a Telefunken wireless agent. The first chairman was Hugh Denison. Ernest Fisk, a foundation director, was general and technical manager. In 1916 he became managing director and in 1932 chairman.

The Marconi Company sued the Australian government in 1912, for infringing their patent (and AWL issued writs against firms using Marconi equipment), the government decided in future to use circuits designed by John Balsillie. Eventually the two firms settled their differences and, on 11 July 1913, formed a new company, Amalgamated Wireless (Australasia) Ltd, with exclusive rights throughout Australasia to the patents, 'present and future', of both Marconi and Telefunken. Later that year the new entity established the Marconi Telefunken College of Telegraphy, (later renamed the Marconi School of Wireless.

The first radio broadcast from the United Kingdom to Australia was received in 1918 by AWA with then Prime Minister of Australia Billy Hughes, praising the troops he has just inspected on the western front. In 1930, AWA transmitted the first newsreel pictures from Sydney to London.

The Australian Government, requiring a direct radio service with the UK - in lieu of submarine cables - commissioned AWA to create a service in 1922. The government boosted the new company's capital and became its majority shareholder. In 1926, the company established two large beam wireless stations on 180 hectare sites; a receiver site in Victoria at Rockbank near Melbourne and a transmitter site at Ballan near Ballarat which eventually become known as Fiskville. A shortwave beam radiotelegraph service between Australia and Britain, undercutting the cable companies, was inaugurated on 8 April 1927 and terminated on 31 May 1969. In 1928, it established a similar service between Australia and Canada. In April 1930 the Empire radiotelephone service commenced.

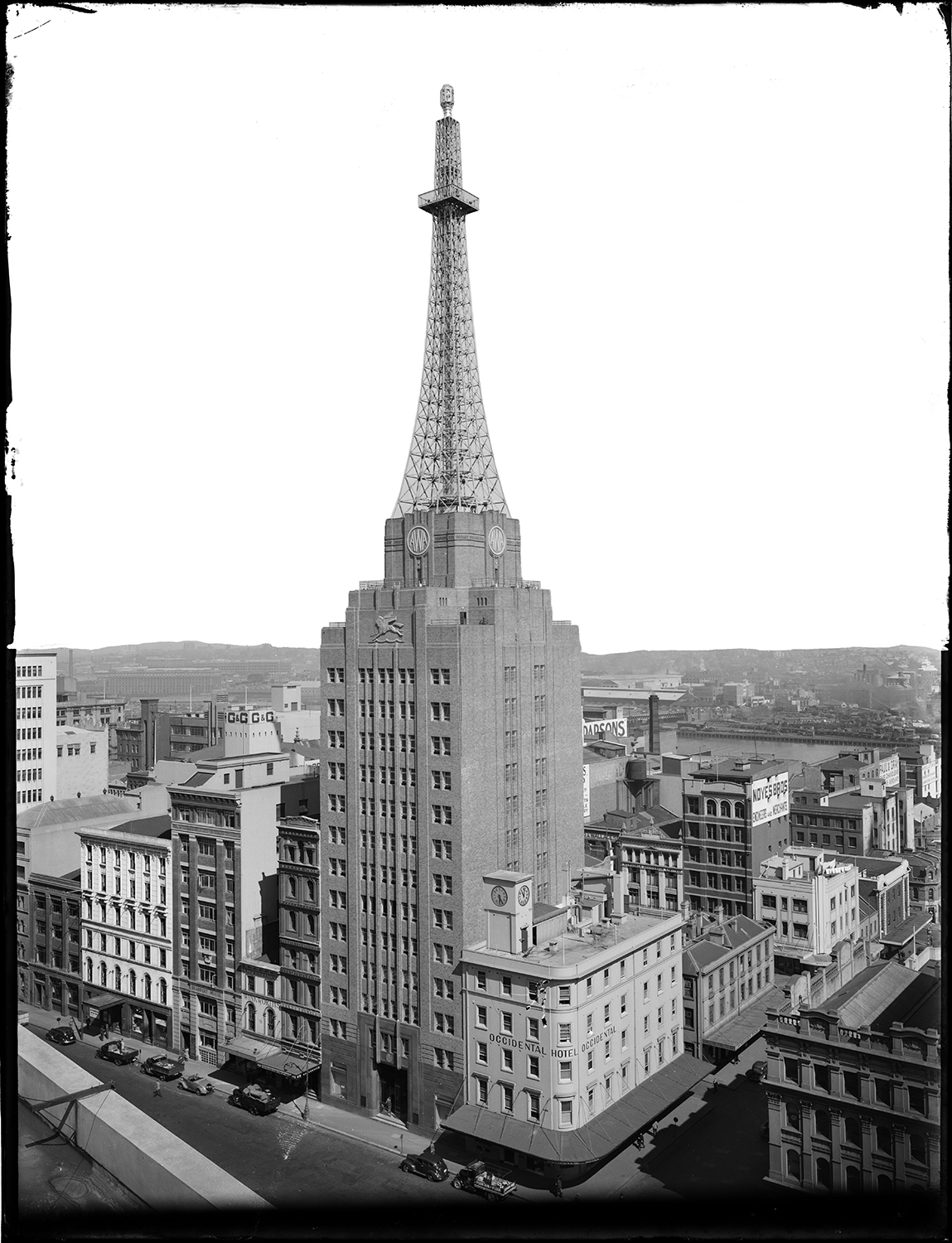
AWA Building and Tower, York Street, Sydney, c. February 1939

The Australian Government in 1922 granted AWA exclusive rights to operate the Coastal Radio Service (CRS), a network of maritime radio stations that eventually included stations in New Guinea which had been hurriedly installed when Japan entered World War II. The Overseas Telecommunications Act 1946 resulted in the creation of the Overseas Telecommunications Commission and ownership of the CRS was transferred to this new organisation on 1 October 1946. In effect, all overseas telecommunications was nationalised. Australia was adopting a Commonwealth-wide policy that had been adopted the Commonwealth conference in 1945. The main goal was to end the artificial routing of traffic to cable or wireless depending on private financial profits.

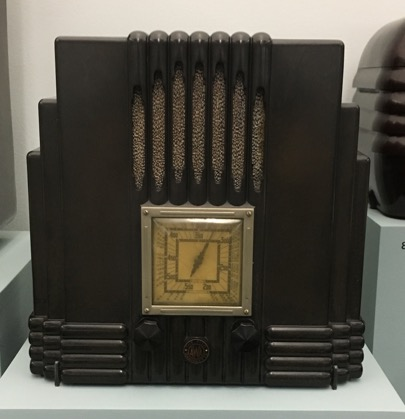
Amalgamated Wireless R29 Fisk Radiolette radio (1935), made of Bakelite

With its commencement in the 1930s, AWA Aviation Department (later Aviation Division) operated the major avionics servicing organisation in Australia and Papua New Guinea through a number of service depots located at major and secondary airports, with a large workshop located in Airport West, Victoria.

=== World War II years ===
During World War II, the Marconi School trained an extensive number of military personnel in signals and communications. Additionally, the Department of Defence appropriated and operated the Ballan facility for military radio operations, eventually returning it to civilian operations with the Overseas Telecommunications Commission (OTC). OTC joined with Telecom Australia in 1992 to form the Australian and Overseas Telecommunications Corporation, later to become Telstra.

AWA continued in maritime operations supplying marine radio operators to Australian registered vessels. The AWA Marine Division with its headquarters in the Sydney suburb of Leichhardt continued to wholesale marine communications and radar equipment to the Australian maritime and leisure-boating market into the mid-1980s.

The AWA Building at 45-47 York Street, Sydney was completed in 1939 becoming an instant landmark with its art-deco style and large white radio tower on top (in the shape of the Eiffel Tower) and was the tallest building in Australia until 1958. It remained the AWA head office until the 1990s and is now listed on the NSW State Heritage Register.

=== Post-World War II ===
Immediately after World War II through to the 1980s, AWA was extensively involved in the design, development and manufacture of advanced aeronautical communications, navigation and surveillance systems. These systems included the VHF Aural Range (VAR), Distance Measuring Equipment (DME) for airborne use and ground beacons, VHF Omni Range (VOR), Air Traffic Control systems (known as AWANET) and a Microwave Landing System (MLS) called Interscan. Many of these developments were undertaken jointly with the Commonwealth Scientific and Industrial Research Organisation (CSIRO) and the Australian Department of Civil Aviation. Some of these products are now produced and supported by Interscan Navigation Systems, which for some years was a privately held stand-alone company, but is now a fully owned subsidiary of Indra Sistemas, a Spanish defence and ICT contractor.

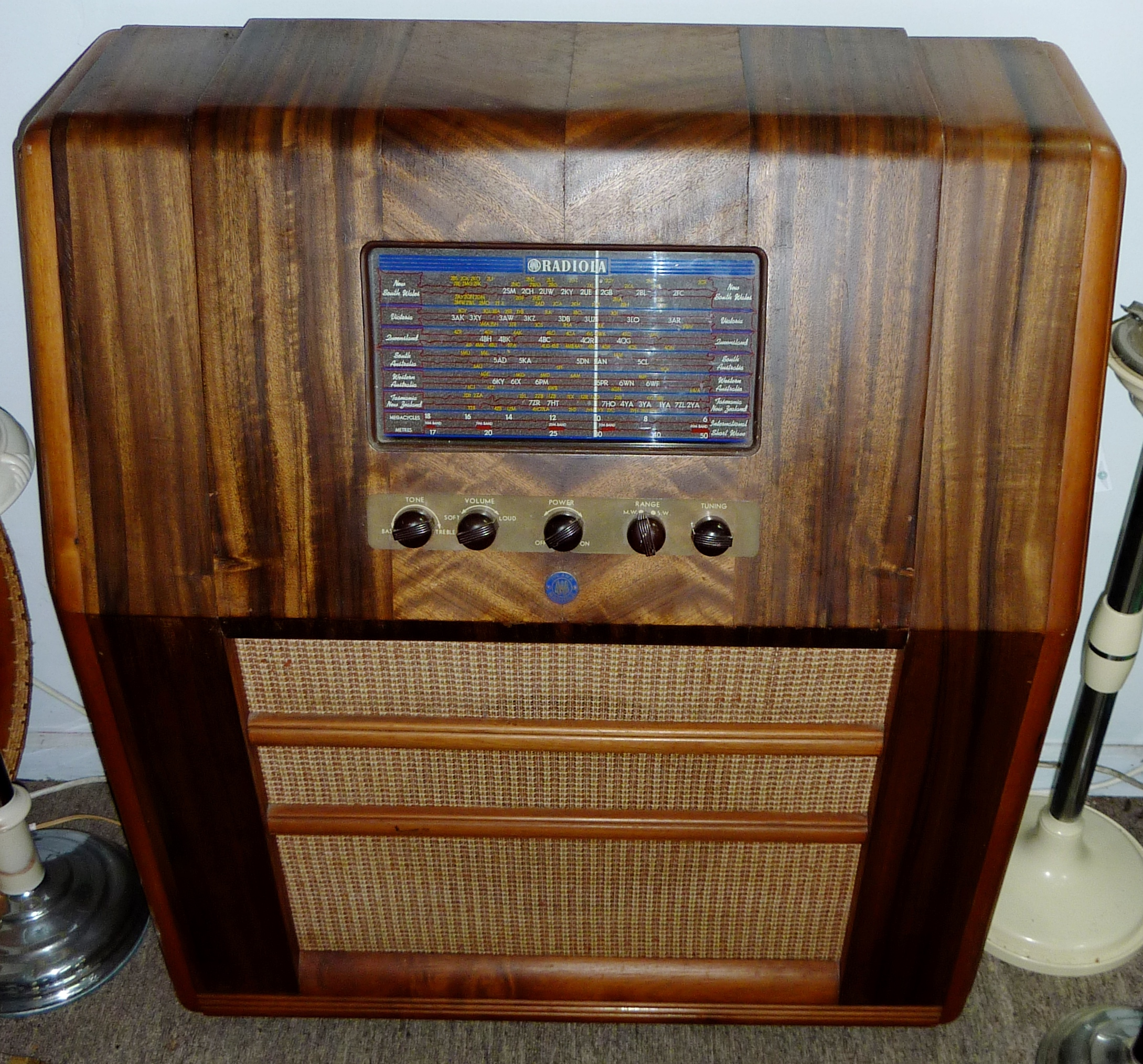
AWA Radiola Console Radio circa 1945

AWA engineers were also working with Marconi in England on television systems from 1948, and in 1954 AWA provided the first experimental TV broadcast in Australia during Queen Elizabeth II's Australian Royal Tour. From 1948 to 1991, under its Aviation Division, AWA held the contract to install and maintain the avionics of the Australian domestic airlines (Ansett-ANA, later Ansett Australia and Trans Australia Airlines, later Australian Airlines). The Aviation Division was sold to British Aerospace in 1996, before being sold again to Rockwell Collins to be absorbed within its Australian avionics maintenance operations.

AWA continued to have major involvement in the Australian defence electronics industry. It worked closely with the Defence Science and Technology Organisation (DSTO) in developing the electronics in the Ikara anti-submarine weapon, Nulka EW rocket drone, AN/SSQ-801A Barra sonobuoy (with Plessey as Sonobuoys Australia Pty Ltd), Evolved Sea Sparrow Missile (ESSM), Agile Gliding Bomb and ALR-2002 Radar Warning Receiver, as well as providing support to the initial Jindalee Over The Horizon Radar trials. AWA Defence Industries (AWADI) was formed in October 1988 by the merger of the defence electronics business of AWA with those of Thorn EMI Electronics Australia and Fairey Australasia. AWADI was sold to British Aerospace Australia (now BAE Systems Australia) in April 1996.

With Radio Corporation of America (RCA), AWA established a joint venture (Amalgamated Wireless Valve Co. Pty Ltd) to manufacture radio valves (vacuum tubes) at the Ashfield works under the AWV, RCA and Radiola brands. During World War II AWV produced a range of defence electronics materiel, including klystrons and magnetrons for radar equipment. In 1958 AWV commercialised research work by the AWA Research Laboratories to set up a plant to manufacture transistors and AWA Semiconductors was born. AWA continued to distribute products from RCA Semiconductor into the mid-1980s.

=== 1970s ===
AWA was a major manufacturer of television receivers under the AWA Radiola Deep Image brand from the mid-1950s until the relaxation of import tariffs under the Whitlam government in the early 1970s. With the increased competition in the marketplace, AWA joined forces with Thorn Electrical Industries UK in 1973 to create AWA-Thorn Consumer Products Limited, to produce colour televisions in Australia. Thorn colour television receivers modified for Australia were marketed as AWA or Thorn models, with local improvements being made to these over the ensuing years. This division of AWA (later known as the Ashfield Division) was also the Australian distributor for many audio equipment manufacturers, including Tannoy, Revox, and AKG Acoustics.

AWA-Rediffusion, a company jointly owned by Rediffusion International and AWA Limited, was formed in 1971. The business was a platform to enter the Australian market with Rediffusion systems similar to those offered in the UK by RIS/RBE and included products and services such as Reditune Background Music, CCTV, Hotel Audio Distribution and Specialist Information Display Systems. In 1974 AWA-Rediffusion branched into the television sales and rental market setting up a chain of retail shops under their Redihire name. Colour television arrived in Australia in March 1975, around ten years after the UK. and Redihire had been preparing for the event for over a year with six shops opening in and around the Sydney area with the company's headquarters in Roseville, New South Wales. Television rental accounted for around twenty percent of the initial market and Redihire adopted a 'rent or buy' marketing approach from the onset majoring on existing models that were being made for AWA-Thorn by Mitsubishi Electric of Japan.

In 1975, AWA brought the first Pick minicomputer system to Australia, and set up a computer services arm.

In 1977 AWA MicroElectronics was formed to design and manufacture integrated circuits and established a fully operational wafer foundry, integrated circuit fabrication facility and design centre. The group was a joint venture between AWA Ltd (64%), British Aerospace (25%) and the NSW Government (11%). This group was sold off to Quality Semiconductor Australia (now Silanna Semiconductor) in 1996.

In 1979 the Marconi School of Wireless moved to Launceston, Tasmania to become part of the Australian Maritime College. Later that year, the last Australian-made AWA appliances were produced at the company's Sydney manufacturing plant in Ashfield. From the late 1970s, appliances such as TVs were being made for AWA-Thorn by Mitsubishi Electric of Japan. This division of AWA was also the Australian distributor for many audio equipment manufacturers, including Tannoy, Revox, AKG Acoustics and Clarion (car audio). In 1984, Mitsubishi Electric purchased AWA-Thorn, (renaming it Mitsubishi Electric AWA), marketing their VCRs, stereos and TVs in Australia while retaining 'AWA' in the brand name.

=== 1980s ===
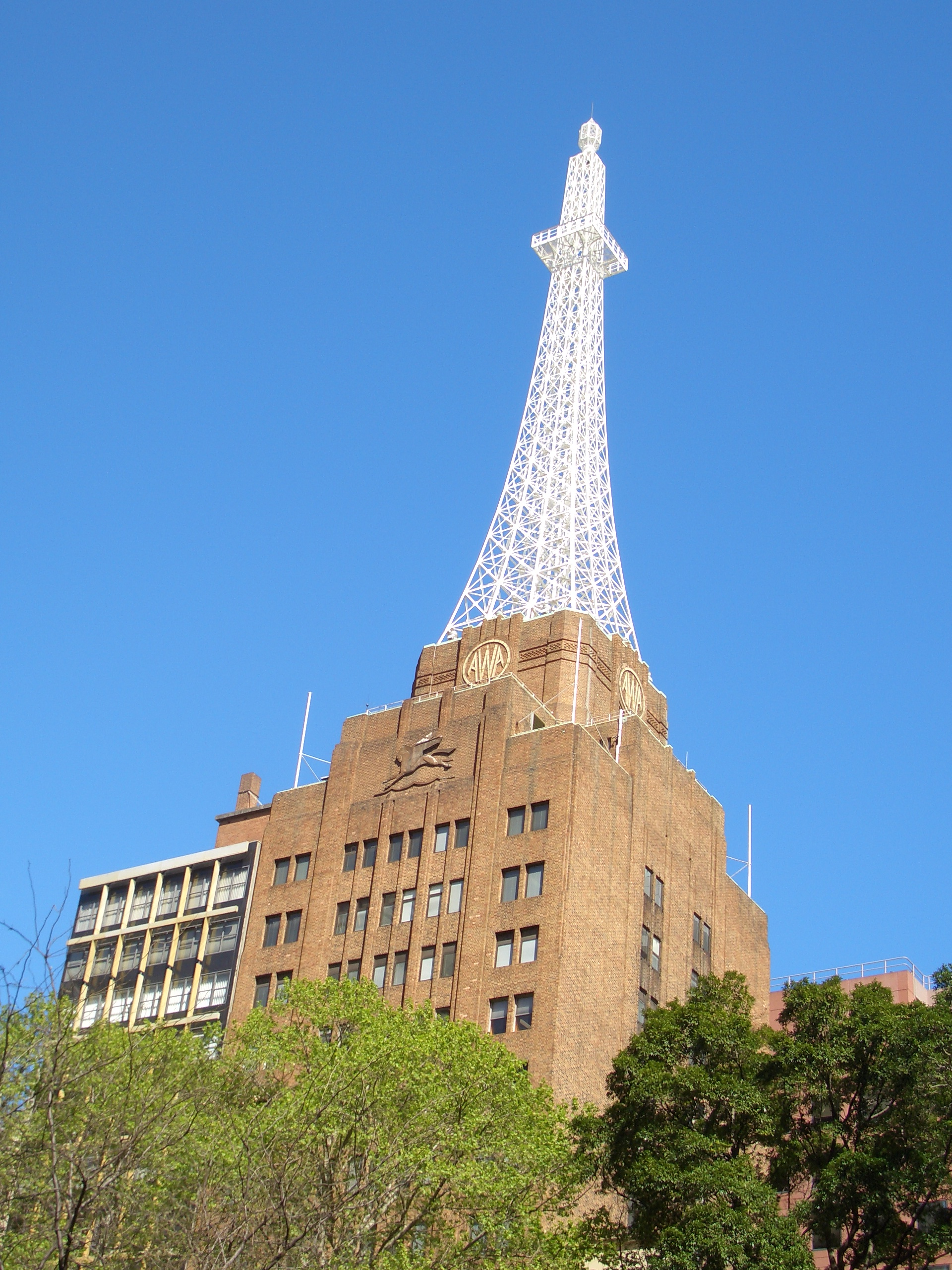
AWA Tower

AWA moved into TV broadcasting again in 1980, purchasing the Nine Network TV station QTQ-9 in Brisbane. In 1985, it was sold to Alan Bond, as Bond began to assemble his ownership of the Nine Network.

Through research done at the AWA Research Laboratories, AWA was an early entrant into the design and development of optical fibre technology in Australia. In 1984, AWA, in partnership with Corning of the US and Metal Manufactures Limited, established Optical Waveguides Australia Pty Ltd (OWA). AWA later sold its interest in OWA, which was eventually purchased fully by Corning to become Corning Noble Park, but closed in 2003. Also in 1984 AWA acquired Electrical Equipment Ltd, a major manufacturer of power transmission equipment. The AWA group had a combined staff of over 10,000.

In 1987, AWA reported A$49 million in foreign exchange losses due to unauthorised trading in 1986 and 1987. Over the next decade, in what developed into a landmark case in Australia, there were legal proceedings against auditors for failing to identify the trading, as well as cross claims against the company's directors, the foreign exchange trader and the banks involved.

As a result, later that year AWA radio stations 2GN Goulburn, 3BO Bendigo, 3MP Melbourne, 4CA Cairns, 4TO Townsville and 6KY Perth were purchased by Wesgo for A$40 million.

In 1988, the company was renamed AWA Limited, and in August sold its telephone manufacturing and related businesses to Exicom. A year later, AWA Computer Support Services was established as an independent business unit.

In the late 1980s, AWA established AWASCo Pty Ltd, a joint venture with Serco of the UK. The company provided facilities management services to federal and state agencies, and eventually Serco purchased AWA's share to form Serco Australia.

=== 1990s ===
In the early 1990s, unable to compete with cheaper imported appliances, AWA exited the field of domestic appliances and consumer electronics, instead to focus on industrial technology.

In 1991, AWA purchased Melbourne radio station 3XY, relaunching it in 1992 as 3EE The Breeze. The station attracted good weekend audience ratings due to broadcasts of Australian Football League matches, but its Monday to Friday audience share was less than forecast estimates, and in 1993 the station was sold to Wesgo Communications. AWA exited the industry in 1994, with the sale of Sydney station 2CH to John Singleton.

=== 2000s ===
In 2001, AWA was acquired by Jupiters. Shortly after Jupiters merged with Tabcorp, in 2004 the company was spun off, once again becoming an independent company.

In 2006, AWA acquired Telefix Sales, which has been servicing home entertainment products since the early 1960s.

In May 2010, the employee at the centre of 1987's foreign exchange losses, Andrew Koval, was extradited from the United States to face criminal charges. He had previously defended a civil suit in relation to the matter.

=== 2010s ===
In February 2014 AWA Limited voluntarily appointed administrators because it may have been insolvent. In May 2014 the company was purchased by Mount Waverley based Cabrini Health Limited, a not-for-profit Catholic healthcare provider.

In June 2025 AWA Technologies was sold by Cabrini to ARA Group to become part of ARA Technologies.

== Summary of company names ==
- Australasian Wireless Limited (AWL) - 1909
- Australasian Wireless Company, Limited (AWCL) - 1910
- Amalgamated Wireless (Australasia) Ltd (AWA) - 1913
- AWA Defence Industries (AWADI) - 1988
  - sold to British Aerospace Australia in April 1996
- Amalgamated Wireless Valve Co. Pty Ltd (AWV)
- AWA MicroElectronics Pty Ltd - 1987
- AWA Plessey
- AWA-Thorn Consumer Products Limited - 1973
  - In 1984, Mitsubishi Electric purchased AWA-Thorn, renaming it "Mitsubishi Electric AWA Pty Ltd"
- Optical Waveguides Australia Pty Ltd (OWA) - 1984
- AWA-Rediffusion (Pty) Ltd. 1971 - 1986.
- In 1988, the company was renamed "AWA Limited"
- AWASCo Pty Ltd
- AWA Computer Support Services established as an independent business unit - 1989
- In 2001 AWA was acquired by Jupiters, which was soon acquired by Tabcorp.
- In 2004, the company was spun off as AWA Limited, and is once again an independent company.

== Current ==
AWA has offices in Sydney, Melbourne, Brisbane, Adelaide, Perth, and Newcastle and a national network of more than 700 service agents.

== Isoton ==
Established by Greg Steers in 1988 as Oasis Systems, their service regions, as Isoton, include Australia and Asia.
