= Australasian Wireless =

Telecommunication companies

Australasian Wireless relates to two separate entities: Australasian Wireless Limited and Australasian Wireless Company Limited. The former obtained an option to acquire the exclusive rights to the Telefunken wireless telegraphy system in Australasia, the latter acquired those rights and with public capital developed a firm which was successful in supplying wireless telegraphy equipment to shipping in Australasian waters and the establishment of Australia's first coastal radio stations. When the Australian Government decided to complete the remainder of the coastal network using the Balsillie wireless system manufactured by Father Archibald Shaw, AWCL merged with Marconi interests to form Amalgamated Wireless (Australasia). This merged firm eventually won the exclusive right to operate Australia's coastal radio network and went on to become the dominant company in Australia's radiocommunications and broadcasting industry.

== Corporate history ==
=== AWL ===
AWL was established in 1909 and acquired the option to acquire the exclusive right to the German Telefunken wireless telegraphy system in Australasia.

In December 1909 a new company was registered, Australasian Wireless Limited. Capital was £5,000 in 5,000 shares of £1 each. The object of the firm was to acquire options and rights in regard to wireless telegraphy and telephony, to establish and maintain stations. In May 1910, the capital of Australasian Wireless was increased to £12,000 with the issue of 7,000 additional shares of £1 each. The directors were Hugh Robert Denison (Sydney), William Norman McLeod (Sydney) and J. M. Jolly (Melbourne). All the directors were also large shareholders and there were several non-directorial minority shareholders. The company secretary was F. W. Humphries. H. Leverrier was the technical director and K. L. Moens was the Telefunken technical expert. Moens was a key employee of Telefunken and was responsible for the oversight of installation and commissioning of most of their stations in Oceania.

=== AWCL ===
AWCL was established in 1910 and with public funding acquired all the assets of AWL.

=== AWA ===
AWA was established in 1913 from a merger with Marconi interests in Australia.

== Telefunken ==
Count Arco studied mechanical engineering and electro-technology in the technical university in Charlottenburg, Berlin, from 1893. Adolf Slaby had participated in Marconi's English Channel experiments in 1897 and returning to Germany commenced to expand upon the experiments at Charlottenburg. Count Arco was an assistant to Slaby for a time. When he concluded his studies in 1898, he joined AEG to commercially develop wireless systems. Their products were most successful but just as in Great Britain, patent disputes held back progress principally with Siemens. The impasse was resolved, at the behest of William II, German Emperor, by founding a common enterprise, the Society for Wireless Telegraphy Ltd. The company's telegraphic address, Telefunken, eventually became the company name. A similar strategy was adopted in the formation of AWA a few years later from the merger of AWCL and Marconi interests. British sentiment was so strong in Australia at the time, that no foreign system would have been be able to make much headway here if it were run by foreigners. But, through the agency of Mr. Starker (of Messrs. Starker and Fisher, electricians, of Sydney), AWL were able to acquire the whole of the present and future rights of the Telefunken system in Australia. Australia became the first country in the world to acquire the exclusive use of these patents, the Telefunken company in every other case retaining their own patents and selling the apparatus on royalty, as well as installing it themselves. At the time, Telefunken had been installed throughout Europe with the exception of England and Italy which were committed to the Marconi system. Telefunken was being widely deployed in North and South America. The United States Navy had just ordered 20 long-distance Telefunken stations to be installed at their various naval depots. Many of the US warships were already fitted up with Telefunken including those of the USA Fleet which had visited Australian port in 1908. At variance with the British Post Office, their defence authorities had also recently ordered six Telefunken military stations.

== Wireless Coastal stations ==
In 1910, AWL established a medium power Telefunken system at the Australia Hotel as an experimental station and was later granted a commercial licence to exchange messages with coastal shipping at a rate of charge agreed with the Postmaster-General's Department (PMG).

=== Australia Hotel ===
The Australasian Wireless Co. had established a low power experimental station at the Australia Hotel, Castlereagh Street, Sydney. The Australia Hotel was at the time, Australia's most luxurious hotel and the destination of choice for the wealthy and famous. The hotel was the venue for the first meeting for the establishment of the Wireless Institute of Australia in March 1910. This station itself, was useful to the company, primarily for testing equipment at its main station at Underwood St, Sydney (the head office for the Bulletin, part owner of the company). It is first reported in the press in November 1910, but this appears to be a major upgrade rather than initial usage. Medium power equipment was transferred at this time from Underwood Street and a large antenna installed on the rooftop of the hotel, at its highest 80 ft. above the roof (170 ft. AGL). The wireless apparatus was installed in a room immediately below the roof. The apparatus was of the Telefunken system, the company having the rights to that system in Australia. The PMG allocated the callsign AAA. Despite its brief existence, the station made its mark in history. On 5 December 1910, a journalist of the Sydney Sun conducted an "interview" with world champion sculler Dick Arnst, by means of the Australia Hotel station and the fitted-for-wireless RMS Ulimaroa. This was claimed as an Australian first. In a sideline story, the journalist provides an eloquent description of the wireless room. In another triumph, the Australia Hotel station played a major part in establishing that the training ship Mersey was fine when fears were held for her safety at sea.

Due to delays in the establishment of the high power Pennant Hills coastal station, Australasian Wireless Co. (the contractors for the construction of the Pennant Hills station), sought and received a commercial licence to establish at their own cost a temporary facility at the Australia Hotel. This new licence was given effect without material change to the technical equipment already installed there. But now the company could advertise its formal approval to solicit communications with nearby merchant shipping, and to charge for the service. The station formally commenced service on 3 June 1911. The service appears to have been an immediate commercial success and daily advertisements offering communication appeared in the local newspapers, together with a list of ships expected to be within wireless range on the day. It is telling that the Postmaster-General's Department intervened with the Australasian Wireless Co. to increase the rates for transmission of messages. This was to ensure parity with future charges for the Pennant Hills station.

A controversy enveloped the station 1 January 1912 when Farmer, the operator of the station reported brief wireless contact with the Macquarie Island station of the Australasian Antarctic Expedition immediately after the Island being in communication with HMS Encounter. Subsequently the Encounter asserted that no such communication had occurred and the PMG made definitive statements to that effect. It was considered in the press that Farmer had been the victim of a hoax. But Farmer held to his statements. The Australia Hotel was using Telefunken equipment identical to that at Macquarie Island which was distinctive in note. Also the two Macquarie Island wireless operators were Charles Sandell and Arthur Sawyer. Sandell was formerly a Sydney experimenter while Sawyer was, immediately prior to the expedition, was the chief operator at the Australia Hotel station. Farmer would have been familiar with the "fist" (the distinctive operating style) of either operator, and on balance of evidence it does appear that the contact occurred, despite it being the height of summer in the southern hemisphere. Farmer nevertheless promptly responded to Macquarie Island when a message was relayed from the RMS Ulimaroa to the Australia Hotel, being a message from Sawyer to his mother. P. Farmer quickly established direct communication with Macquarie Island, which stated that they had been hearing the Australia Hotel for some time. Farmer provided a vast amount of Australian news for the Island's crew and promised to provide daily updates henceforth.

This was an era of rapid repositioning in wireless regulation. Balsillie had been engaged as Commonwealth wireless expert and offered his "Australian Wireless" system gratis to the Commonwealth. The Australian Wireless system was evaluated by an independent expert and found to be more efficient than either the Marconi system or the Telefunken system. The Commonwealth promptly swung its support behind the Australian Wireless system. The first two coastal stations had been contracted to Australasian Wireless Co. but the Commonwealth now swiftly proceeded with new stations commencing with Melbourne (callsign VIM) and Hobart (VIH). Pennant Hills (callsign VIS) was essentially complete, but the Commonwealth would not sign off on "practical completion". Australasian Wireless Co. did not seem entirely unhappy with this system, as it permitted the commercial operations at the Australia Hotel to continue for a longer period than envisaged. Finally, on 3 June 1912, the Department gave three months notice of cancellation of the commercial licence, stating that if Pennant Hills was not complete at that time, they would make alternative arrangements. Circa 3 September 1912 the AAA equipment was relocated back to Underwood St (becoming callsign ATY). The "alternative arrangements" alluded to by the PMG were made clear on 10 September 1912 when equipment at Pennant Hills failed, only a few days after cancellation of the licence and the outage was covered by wireless apparatus at Father Shaw's wireless factory at Randwick, the facility at the Australia Hotel being dismantled.

=== Menzies Hotel ===
The Postmaster-General approved the establishment of another commercial licence for AWCL at the Menzies Hotel in Melbourne. There are no reports of actual operation by the station, or even of a licence being issued, so it is probable that the proposal did not proceed.

=== VIS / POP Sydney ===
The POS / VIS coastal radio station commenced in 1912.

=== POP / VIP Perth ===
The POP / VIP station commenced operation in 1912.

== Shipping ==
The Telefunken system was widely known in world shipping circles in the late 1900s and early 1910s and was often referred to as the "singing system" due to the pure tone which was transmitted and received, contrasting with the harsh, raspy tone of the Marconi system and others. The Marconi company initially dominated British naval and merchant shipping interests, but the German-based Telefunken had a strong foothold in German shipping. In Australia, the Telefunken system gained extensive publicity from:

- AWCL's successful tender for the first two Australian coastal stations
- AWCL's establishment of the first coastal station (albeit temporary) at the Australia Hotel
- Director Hugh Denison's major sponsorship of the Australasian Antarctic Expedition
- AWCL's provision of two complete wireless telegraphy stations for the Australasian Antarctic Expedition
- Two of the wireless operators for the Australasian Antarctic Expedition being sourced from the staff of AWCL

As a result the firm started to make significant inroads on the rapidly growing market for wireless installations on coastal shipping in Australia and New Zealand, as well as inter-island shipping in the Pacific

== Australasian Antarctic Expedition ==
AWL/AWCL had a close association with the Australasian Antarctic Expedition 1911-1914. Director Hugh Denison was a major sponsor of the expedition. The firm supplied two complete Telefunken 2 kW wireless telegraphy systems to the expedition which were established at Macquarie Island and Cape Denison. The former was the first wireless telegraphy station operating at the sub-Antarctic island. The latter was the first wireless telegraphy station to operate anywhere on the Antarctic mainland. Two operators from AWCL's Australia Hotel station became wireless operators on the expedition: Arthur Sawyer and Sidney Jeffryes

== Amalgamated Wireless (Australasia) ==
AWA was established in 1913 from a merger with Marconi interests in Australia.

== See also ==
- Call signs in Australia (comprehensive discussion of callsigns for all services, structure a little confusing)
- History of broadcasting in Australia (comprehensive discussion including the pre-broadcasting era of wireless telegraphy)
