= William Dixson =

Australian businessman, collector and benefactor (1870–1952)

Sir William Dixson
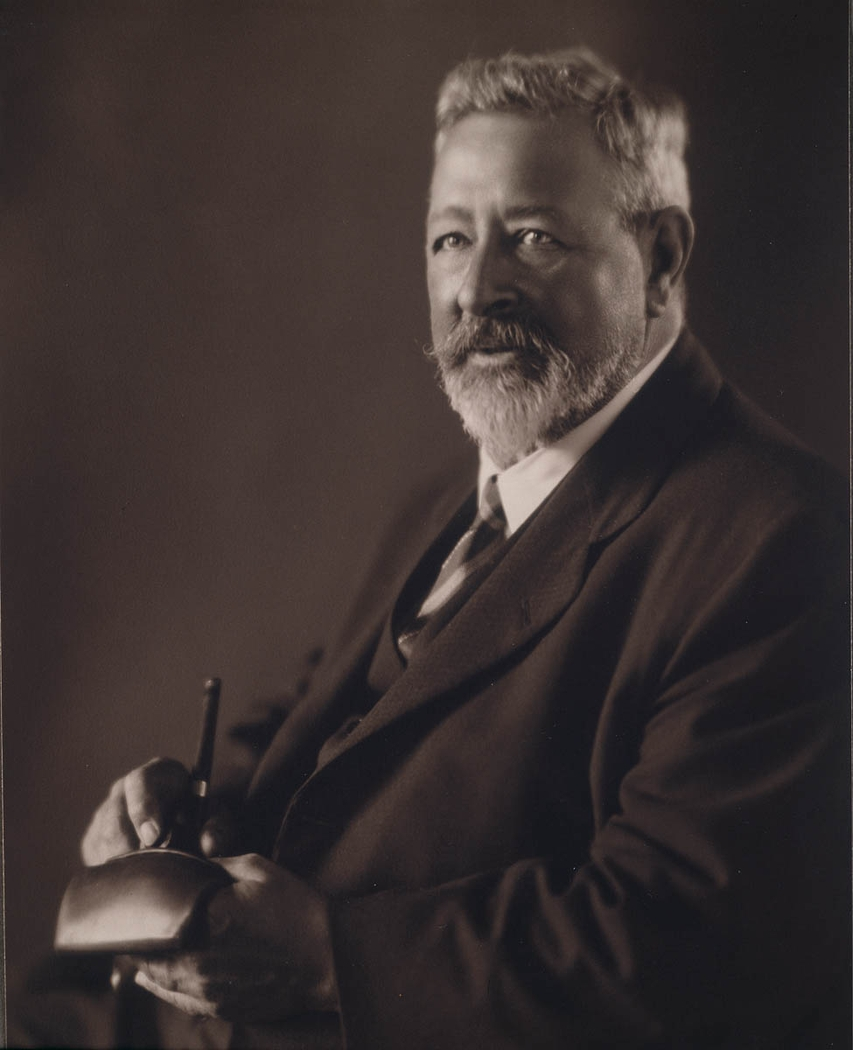
- Born: 18 April 1870; Sydney, Australia
- Died: 17 August 1952 (aged 82); Chatswood, New South Wales, Australia
- Occupations: Businessman, collector, benefactor

Sir William Dixson (18 April 1870 – 17 August 1952) was an Australian businessman, collector and benefactor who bequeathed his collection of over 20,000 items of Australiana to the State Library of New South Wales, forming the Dixson Library. In recognition of his public benefactions, Dixson was knighted in the New Year Honours of 1939.

== Life and education ==
Dixson was the eldest surviving son of tobacco manufacturer and philanthropist Sir Hugh Dixson. He was educated at All Saints' College in Bathurst, New South Wales, and gained engineering qualifications in Scotland in 1889–96. He returned to Australia and worked for several years for the engineer and urban visionary, Norman Selfe. Dixson authored a small work on the French explorers Dumont D'Urville and Lapérouse.

Dixson was a director of various businesses and public bodies, including Dixson & Sons Ltd from 1899 to 1903, the British-Australasian Tobacco Company from 1903 to 1908, the City Bank of Sydney from 1909 to 1917, the Dixson Trust Ltd from 1909 to 1952, and Timbrol Ltd until 1952.

After a visit to the David Scott Mitchell's Library in June 1893, local artist Walter Syer made some quick sketches of Mitchell, which the artist Lionel Lindsay used as the basis of etchings created for Dixson.

== Collection ==
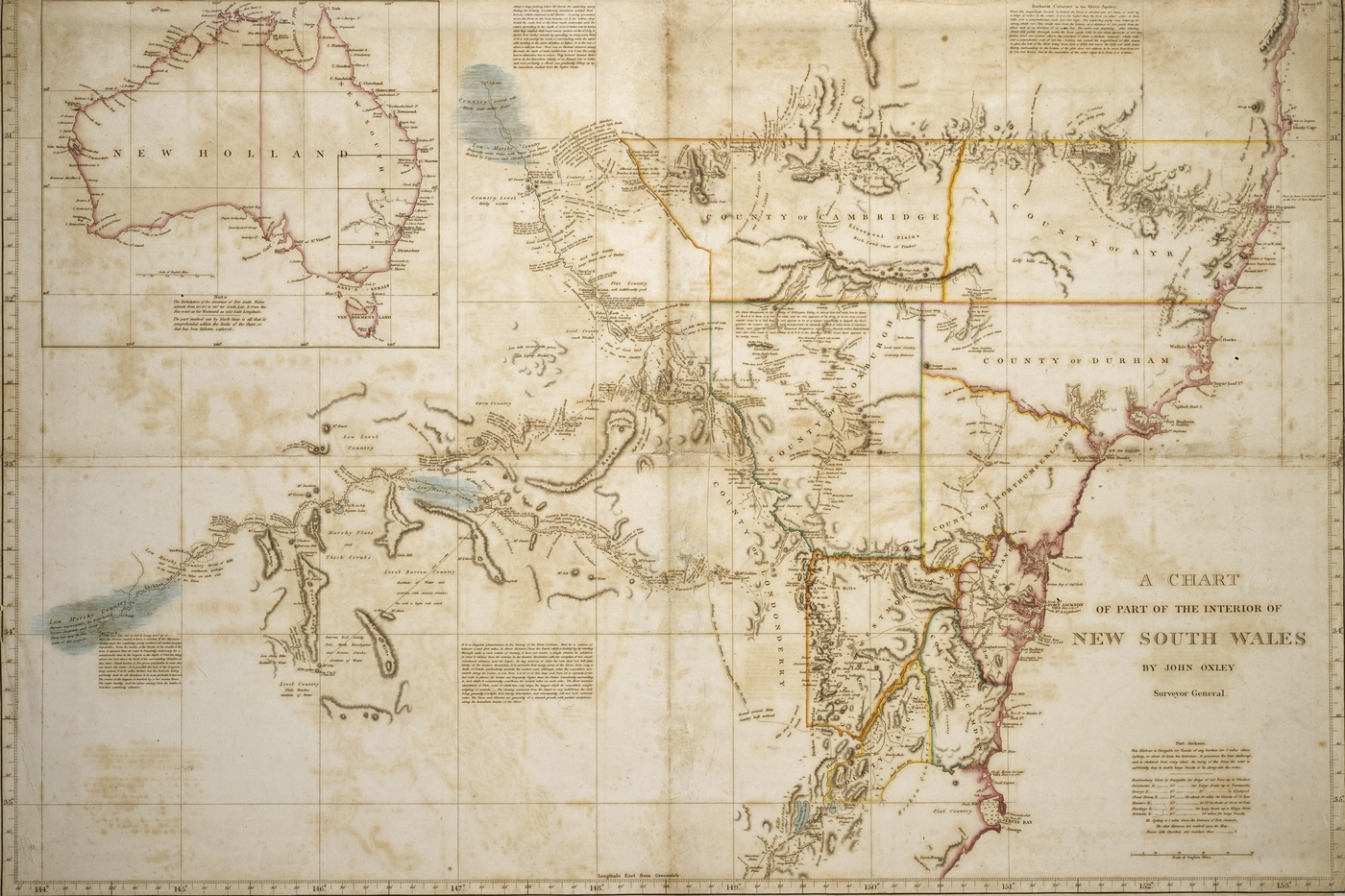
Map of the interior of NSW, 1822 by John Oxley. Part of the Dixson map collection

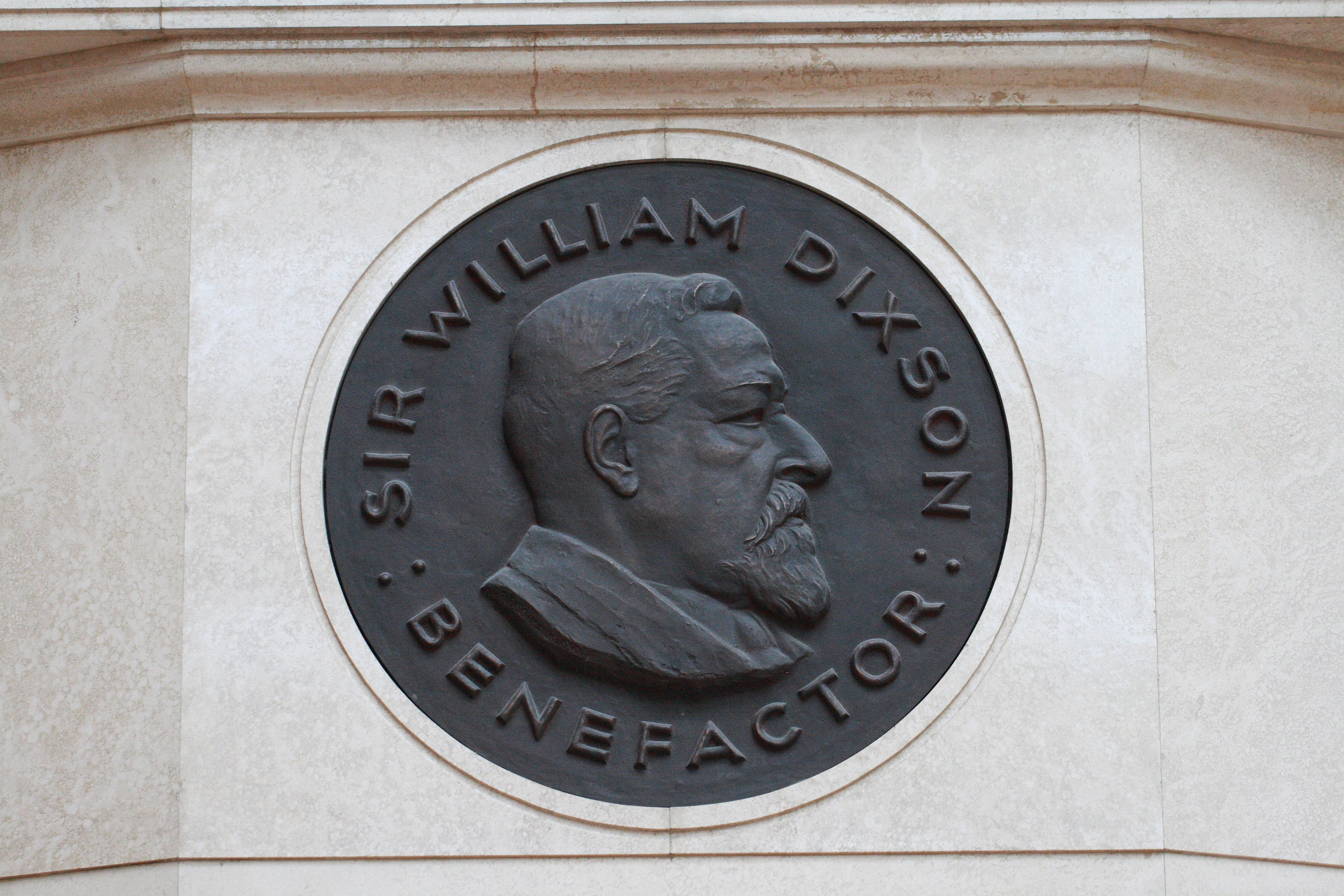
Portrait medallion of Sir William Dixson in the Mitchell Library

Dixson, who began collecting books and manuscripts in the 1890s, originally focussed on Australiana. However, the collection also includes many European works considered to be "rare and valuable". Together with the earlier bequest of David Scott Mitchell the printed book collections represent the published history of Australia and especially New South Wales of the time. Collection strengths include the exploration of the Pacific, Antarctica and Australia. Also included are significant collections relating to Australian literature, theatre, art, architecture, sport, natural history, Indigenous material and biography.

"Dixson's collecting soon widened to include many formats – not only books and manuscripts but pictures, coins, medals, curios, relics, postage stamps, bookplates and maps." He especially valued works in pristine condition and would rebind volumes showing signs of wear. At first the collection was for his own use but "...when he learned that the income from David Scott Mitchell's bequest to the Public Library of New South Wales could not be spent on pictures, he 'decided to give special attention to them'".

Among the rare and interesting manuscripts in the Dixson collection are soldiers' diaries from the First Fleet, and the invitation cards and menus from the opening in 1898 of Sydney's Queen Victoria Market Building (now known as the Queen Victoria Building) are also part of the collection.

Dixson's map collection, which became part of the 1952 bequest, "includes examples from the 16th through to the 20th century including hand coloured maps by Dutch mapmakers, Ortelius, Blaeu, de Wit, and Janssonius. Many of the maps are rare manuscript copies by inland explorers including Sir Thomas Mitchell, Ludwig Leichhardt and Augustus Gregory." There is a manuscript map by Evert Gijsbertsz on Africa, Asia and the East Indies, dated 1599. The map collection reveals the interest that Dixson took in exploration, especially "early navigation, geography and the European exploration and settlement of the Pacific".

== Bequests ==
This is a truly magnificent gift by a public-spirited citizen, whose name will be remembered for a long time for the services he rendered this State. It is a pictorial record of the history of New South Wales, and of some parts of Australia which belonged to this State when the pictures were taken.

The Premier (Mr. Bavin) at the opening of the Dixson wing

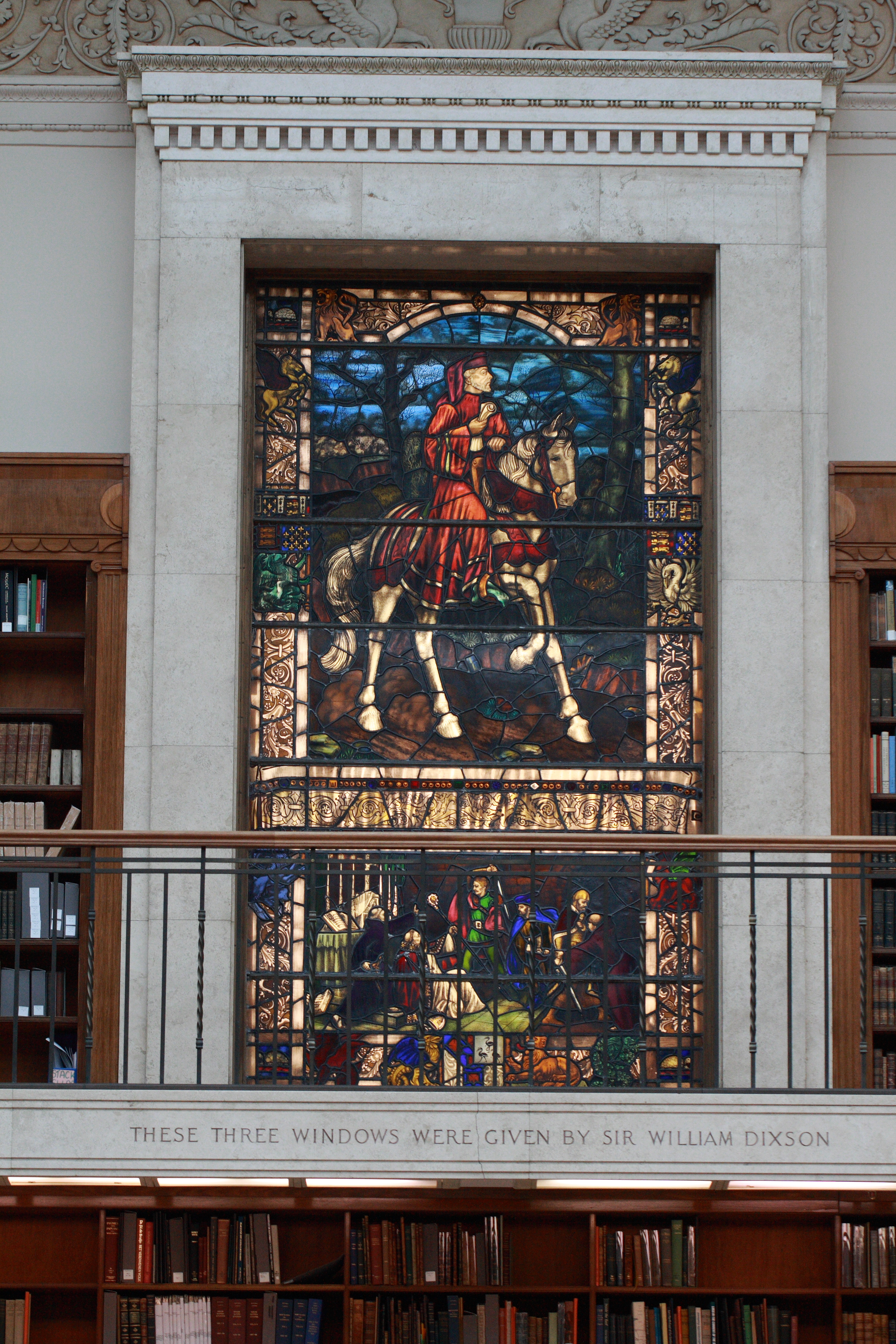
One of the stained glass windows in the main reading room given by Dixson

In 1919, Dixson offered a collection of pictures to the Library on the condition that a suitable gallery was built to accommodate them. Amongst the pictures offered as donations were a portrait of Viscount Sydney by Gilbert Stuart and several portraits of Governor Phillip and Governor Macquarie.

Opening the William Dixson gallery on 21 October 1929, the then Governor, Admiral Sir Dudley de Chair said: "It is a fine thing that Mr. Dixson has done, and his deeds are enhanced by his modest speech ... [he] has bought pictures because of their historical and topographical interest, and among them are pictures that would grace any art gallery in the world."

When Dixson's collection, that included some pictures by artists who accompanied James Cook on his exploratory voyages and eight of the Pedro de Queirós memorials, was transferred to the State Library after his death in 1952, it formed the Dixson library in the State Library of New South Wales. The Chaucer windows, bronze entrance doors and Shakespeare Library chandelier were also part of the bequest. The bequest also included £15,000, the income of which is used to buy historical pictures.

He also provided funds to establish the Sir William Dixson Foundation, which aimed to make rare materials on Australia and the Pacific available to students, through the production of facsimiles.

The main library of the University of New England in Armidale, New South Wales was established with his gift of £5,000 and is named in his honour.

Dixson Circuit in the Canberra suburb of Conder is named in recognition of his patronage of art.

== See also ==
- State Library of New South Wales
- William Herbert Ifould

== Catalogues of bequest ==
- Mitchell and Dixson Galleries (1975), A list of pictures presented by Sir William Dixson during his lifetime or since purchased by the Trustees of the Dixson Galleries, [Mitchell and Dixson Galleries], ISBN 978-0-7240-0757-8
- Hancock, Barbara J. (1996). A listing of the Sir William Dixson Stamp Collection. SLNSW Catalogue reference
- Bidgood, Jeff (1995). Special-purpose bookplates of Australian libraries (I): Dixson Library of the University of New England. Sydney: Book Collectors' Society of Australia. SLNSW Catalogue reference
