= Hugh Dixson =

Australian businessman and philanthropist (1841-1926)

- Born: January 29, 1841; George Street, Sydney
- Died: May 11, 1926 (aged 85); Colombo, Sri Lanka
- Occupations: Businessman and Philanthropist

Sir Hugh Dixson (29 January 1841 – 11 May 1926) was an Australian businessman and philanthropist.

== Biography ==
Dixson was born in George Street, Sydney, the son of Hugh Dixson and his wife Helen, née Craig. He studied at the Elfred House Private School kept by William Timothy Cape at Paddington. At 14 years of age, Dixson worked at a timber yard for Phillip McMahon. In 1866, he married Emma Elizabeth (1844–1922), daughter of William Edward Shaw.

== Philanthropy ==
In addition to seeking to fund a battleship for Britain, Dixson supported other patriotic causes. One such cause was the Legion of Frontiersmen, a patriotic, paramilitary organisation formed in Britain in 1905 by Roger Pocock, a former constable with the North West Mounted Police and Boer War veteran, to bolster the defensive capacity of the British Empire.

In 1900, Emma Dixson founded the Sydney Medical Mission, a service run by women for women of the poorer areas of the city. She was a vice-president of the League of Boy Scouts, and became the patron of the 1st Dulwich Hill Scout Group (known as "Mrs Emma Dixson's Own"), donating the land and paying for the construction of the scout hall. Extensions to the scout hall were built in 1924 by the Dixson children, as a memorial to their mother. In 1919, she gifted six houses in Surry Hills to the Royal Society for the Welfare of Mothers and Babies, to set up a model welfare centre. It was opened in 1922, after Emma Dixson's death, by one of her daughters, and named the Emma Elizabeth Dixson Welfare Centre; the day care centre which was part of it was known in abbreviated form as the Emma Dlxson Day Nursery. She was a life governor of the Queen Victoria Homes for Consumptives, the Crown Street Women's Hospital, Royal Prince Alfred Hospital and of The Infants' Home Child and Family Services; president of the women's branch of the Empire League, and after its reorganisation, a life vice-president of the British Empire League in Australia; the National Council of Women of New South Wales, and the Victoria League; president of the women's auxiliary of the Sydney City Mission; the only female patron of the Veterans' Home of New South Wales; and vice-president of the New South Wales Home for Incurables, Ryde (to which they gave £20,000), and the Fresh Air League.
