= Electoral results for the district of Light =

South Australian district election results

This is a list of electoral results for the Electoral district of Light in South Australian state elections.

== Members for Light ==
Member	Party	Term
Richard Layton Butler	Liberal and Country League	1938–1938
Herbert Michael	Liberal and Country League	1939–1941
Sydney McHugh	Labor Party	1941–1944
Herbert Michael	Liberal and Country League	1944–1956
George Hambour	Liberal and Country League	1956–1960
Leslie Nicholson	Liberal and Country League	1960–1962
John Freebairn	Liberal and Country League	1962–1970
Bruce Eastick	Liberal and Country League	1970–1973
Bruce Eastick	Liberal Party	1973–1993
Malcolm Buckby	Liberal Party	1993–2006
Tony Piccolo	Labor Party	2006–2026

== Election results ==
=== Elections in the 2020s ===
==== 2026 ====
2026 South Australian state election: Light
Party	Candidate	Votes	%	±%
Labor	James Agness	8,889	36.9	−20.6
One Nation	Alexander Banks	8,327	34.5	+27.7
Liberal	Andrew Williamson	2,961	12.3	−11.6
Greens	James Scalzi	2,174	9.0	2.4
Family First	Jacinta Roberts	837	3.5	−1.7
Legalise Cannabis	Liam Morgan	663	2.7	+2.7
Australian Family	Dan Hale	260	1.1	+1.1
Total formal votes		24,111	96.0	−1.0
Informal votes		1,004	4.0	+1.0
Turnout		25,115	85.7	−2.4
Two-candidate-preferred result
Labor	James Agness	12,445	51.6	−17.9
One Nation	Alex Banks	11,658	48.4	+48.4
Labor hold				

==== 2022 ====
2022 South Australian state election: Light
Party	Candidate	Votes	%	±%
Labor	Tony Piccolo	13,144	57.5	+6.4
Liberal	Andrew Williamson	5,468	23.9	−10.5
One Nation	David Duncan	1,542	6.8	+6.8
Greens	Brett Ferris	1,506	6.6	−0.3
Family First	Benjamin Hackett	1,184	5.2	+5.2
Total formal votes		22,844	97.0	
Informal votes		704	3.0	
Turnout		23,548	88.1	
Two-party-preferred result
Labor	Tony Piccolo	15,873	69.5	+11.1
Liberal	Andrew Williamson	6,971	30.5	−11.1
Labor hold		Swing	+11.1	

Distribution of preferences: Light
Party	Candidate	Votes	Round 1		Round 2		Round 3	
Party	Candidate	Votes	Dist.	Total	Dist.	Total	Dist.	Total
Quota (50% + 1)		11,423						
Labor	Tony Piccolo	13,144	+472	13,616	+1,169	14,785	+1,088	15,873
Liberal	Andrew Williamson	5,468	+183	5,651	+281	5,932	+1,039	6,971
One Nation	David Duncan	1,542	+310	1,852	+275	2,127	Excluded	
Greens	Brett Ferris	1,506	+219	1,725	Excluded			
Family First	Benjamin Hackett	1,184	Excluded					

=== Elections in the 2010s ===
==== 2018 ====
2018 South Australian state election: Light
Party	Candidate	Votes	%	±%
Labor	Tony Piccolo	11,906	52.8	+6.0
Liberal	Karen McColl	7,527	33.4	−7.0
Greens	Felicity Green	1,606	7.1	+1.3
Conservatives	Carl Teusner	1,525	6.8	−0.3
Total formal votes		22,564	95.9	−1.2
Informal votes		953	4.1	+1.2
Turnout		23,517	90.5	+8.4
Two-party-preferred result
Labor	Tony Piccolo	13,516	59.9	+5.9
Liberal	Karen McColl	9,048	40.1	−5.9
Labor hold		Swing	+5.9	

2014 South Australian state election: Light
Party	Candidate	Votes	%	±%
Labor	Tony Piccolo	9,919	46.2	−0.2
Liberal	Cosie Costa	9,011	42.0	+1.5
Family First	Wendy Rose	1,355	6.3	+2.1
Greens	Terry Allen	1,193	5.6	+0.2
Total formal votes		21,478	97.3	+0.8
Informal votes		592	2.7	−0.8
Turnout		22,070	92.6	−0.4
Two-party-preferred result
Labor	Tony Piccolo	11,334	52.8	−0.0
Liberal	Cosie Costa	10,144	47.2	+0.0
Labor hold		Swing	−0.0	

2010 South Australian state election: Light
Party	Candidate	Votes	%	±%
Labor	Tony Piccolo	10,077	48.5	+3.8
Liberal	Cosie Costa	7,899	38.0	−1.8
Greens	Penny Johnston	1,088	5.2	+0.3
Family First	Tony Bates	906	4.4	−2.4
Save the RAH	Simon Stewart-Rattray	458	2.2	+2.2
Gamers 4 Croydon	Matthew Allpress	216	1.0	+1.0
Fair Land Tax	Lachlan Hetherington	150	0.7	+0.7
Total formal votes		20,794	95.8	
Informal votes		758	4.2	
Turnout		21,552	92.9	
Two-party-preferred result
Labor	Tony Piccolo	11,499	55.3	+3.2
Liberal	Cosie Costa	9,295	44.7	−3.2
Labor hold		Swing	+3.2	

=== Elections in the 2000s ===
2006 South Australian state election: Light
Party	Candidate	Votes	%	±%
Labor	Tony Piccolo	9,217	44.6	+5.5
Liberal	Malcolm Buckby	8,217	39.7	−3.9
Family First	Olga Vidoni	1,403	6.8	+2.3
Greens	Jenni Douglas	1,027	5.0	+2.1
No Rodeo	Craig Allan	445	2.2	+2.2
Democrats	Alan Collinson	370	1.8	−3.7
Total formal votes		20,679	96.1	−0.5
Informal votes		835	3.9	+0.5
Turnout		21,514	92.5	−2.0
Two-party-preferred result
Labor	Tony Piccolo	10,768	52.1	+4.9
Liberal	Malcolm Buckby	9,911	47.9	−4.9
Labor gain from Liberal		Swing	+4.9	

2002 South Australian state election: Light
Party	Candidate	Votes	%	±%
Liberal	Malcolm Buckby	8,954	43.6	+1.2
Labor	Annette Hurley	8,032	39.1	+3.2
Democrats	Tim Haines	1,121	5.5	−16.2
Family First	Shane Thorman	933	4.5	+4.5
One Nation	David Dwyer	627	3.1	+3.1
Greens	Ruth Jackson	587	2.9	+2.9
SA First	James Gallagher	285	1.4	+1.4
Total formal votes		20,539	96.6	
Informal votes		718	3.4	
Turnout		21,257	94.3	
Two-party-preferred result
Liberal	Malcolm Buckby	10,843	52.8	+1.9
Labor	Annette Hurley	9,696	47.2	−1.9
Liberal hold		Swing	+1.9	

=== Elections in the 1990s ===
1997 South Australian state election: Light
Party	Candidate	Votes	%	±%
Liberal	Malcolm Buckby	9,133	47.3	−12.7
Labor	Pauline Gill	5,917	30.7	+3.1
Democrats	Kate Reynolds	4,249	22.0	+10.4
Total formal votes		19,299	95.6	−1.5
Informal votes		892	4.4	+1.5
Turnout		20,191	93.0	
Two-party-preferred result
Liberal	Malcolm Buckby	10,862	56.3	−8.9
Labor	Pauline Gill	8,437	43.7	+8.9
Liberal hold		Swing	−8.9	

1993 South Australian state election: Light
Party	Candidate	Votes	%	±%
Liberal	Malcolm Buckby	11,482	61.4	+9.0
Labor	Susan Simpson	4,877	26.1	−8.3
Democrats	Catherine Tucker-Lee	2,339	12.5	+4.1
Total formal votes		18,698	97.3	+0.3
Informal votes		526	2.7	−0.3
Turnout		19,224	93.7	
Two-party-preferred result
Liberal	Malcolm Buckby	12,415	66.4	+5.8
Labor	Susan Simpson	6,283	33.6	−5.8
Liberal hold		Swing	+5.8	

=== Elections in the 1980s ===
1989 South Australian state election: Light
Party	Candidate	Votes	%	±%
Liberal	Bruce Eastick	10,912	53.5	−2.1
Labor	Tony Piccolo	6,564	32.2	−5.3
Democrats	John Joyes	1,500	7.4	+2.8
Call to Australia	Theodor Stiller	1,206	5.9	+5.9
Independent	Eric Gerlach	207	1.0	−1.3
Total formal votes		20,389	97.0	+1.6
Informal votes		623	3.0	−1.6
Turnout		21,012	95.9	+1.4
Two-party-preferred result
Liberal	Bruce Eastick	12,818	62.9	+3.6
Labor	Tony Piccolo	7,571	37.1	−3.6
Liberal hold		Swing	+3.6	

1985 South Australian state election: Light
Party	Candidate	Votes	%	±%
Liberal	Bruce Eastick	10,012	55.6	−6.4
Labor	Tony Piccolo	6,756	37.5	+4.5
Democrats	Nicholas Wedge	828	4.6	−0.4
Independent	Eric Gerlach	410	2.3	+2.3
Total formal votes		18,006	95.4	
Informal votes		877	4.6	
Turnout		18,883	94.5	
Two-party-preferred result
Liberal	Bruce Eastick	10,675	59.3	−5.7
Labor	Tony Piccolo	7,331	40.7	+5.7
Liberal hold		Swing	−5.7	

1982 South Australian state election: Light
Party	Candidate	Votes	%	±%
Liberal	Bruce Eastick	9,553	62.3	−1.3
Labor	William Young	4,933	32.2	+2.5
Democrats	Nicholas Wedge	845	5.5	−1.2
Total formal votes		15,331	95.3	−1.3
Informal votes		751	4.7	+1.3
Turnout		16,082	94.9	+0.6
Two-party-preferred result
Liberal	Bruce Eastick	10,000	65.2	−2.0
Labor	William Young	5,331	34.8	+2.0
Liberal hold		Swing	−2.0	

=== Elections in the 1970s ===
1979 South Australian state election: Light
Party	Candidate	Votes	%	±%
Liberal	Bruce Eastick	9,412	63.6	+2.9
Labor	William Young	4,392	29.7	−9.6
Democrats	Barrie Tornquist	999	6.7	+6.7
Total formal votes		14,803	96.6	−1.0
Informal votes		520	3.4	+1.0
Turnout		15,323	94.3	+0.6
Two-party-preferred result
Liberal	Bruce Eastick	9,947	67.2	+6.5
Labor	William Young	4,856	32.8	−6.5
Liberal hold		Swing	+6.5	

1977 South Australian state election: Light
Party	Candidate	Votes	%	±%
Liberal	Bruce Eastick	8,968	60.7	+12.0
Labor	James Reese	5,815	39.3	+9.3
Total formal votes		14,783	97.6	
Informal votes		362	2.4	
Turnout		15,145	93.7	
Liberal hold		Swing	−6.1	

1975 South Australian state election: Light
Party	Candidate	Votes	%	±%
Liberal	Bruce Eastick	5,211	46.7	−15.4
Labor	Douglas Harrison	3,684	33.0	−1.9
Liberal Movement	John Lienert	2,260	20.3	+20.3
Total formal votes		11,155	96.8	−0.2
Informal votes		364	3.2	+0.2
Turnout		11,519	94.4	−1.2
Two-party-preferred result
Liberal	Bruce Eastick	7,019	62.9	−0.7
Labor	Douglas Harrison	4,136	37.1	+0.7
Liberal hold		Swing	−0.7	

1973 South Australian state election: Light
Party	Candidate	Votes	%	±%
Liberal and Country	Bruce Eastick	6,031	62.1	+8.7
Labor	William Sneesby	3,390	34.9	−9.2
Independent	Eric Gerlach	294	3.0	+0.6
Total formal votes		9,715	97.0	−1.5
Informal votes		305	3.0	+1.5
Turnout		10,020	95.6	−0.3
Two-party-preferred result
Liberal and Country	Bruce Eastick	6,179	63.6	+9.0
Labor	William Sneesby	3,536	36.4	−9.0
Liberal and Country hold		Swing	+9.0	

1970 South Australian state election: Light
Party	Candidate	Votes	%	±%
Liberal and Country	Bruce Eastick	4,963	53.4	
Labor	Brian Chatterton	4,101	44.1	
Independent	Eric Gerlach	227	2.4	
Total formal votes		9,291	98.5	
Informal votes		137	1.5	
Turnout		9,428	95.9	
Two-party-preferred result
Liberal and Country	Bruce Eastick	5,077	54.6	
Labor	Brian Chatterton	4,214	45.4	
Liberal and Country hold		Swing		

=== Elections in the 1960s ===
1968 South Australian state election: Light
Party	Candidate	Votes	%	±%
Liberal and Country	John Freebairn	3,873	68.9	−31.1
Labor	Ernest Fahey	1,749	31.1	+31.1
Total formal votes		5,622	98.2	
Informal votes		99	1.8	
Turnout		5,721	96.3	
Liberal and Country hold		Swing	N/A	

1965 South Australian state election: Light
Party	Candidate	Votes	%	±%
Liberal and Country	John Freebairn	unopposed		
Liberal and Country hold		Swing		

1962 South Australian state election: Light
Party	Candidate	Votes	%	±%
Liberal and Country	John Freebairn	2,606	43.9	−27.9
Labor	Colin Wurst	2,005	33.8	+5.6
Independent	Eli Hambour	1,322	22.3	+22.3
Total formal votes		5,933	99.1	+0.5
Informal votes		54	0.9	−0.5
Turnout		5,987	97.4	+2.0
Two-party-preferred result
Liberal and Country	John Freebairn	3,614	60.9	−10.9
Labor	Colin Wurst	2,319	39.1	+10.9
Liberal and Country hold		Swing	−10.9	
