= David Moody (politician) =

Australian politician

David Moody MP
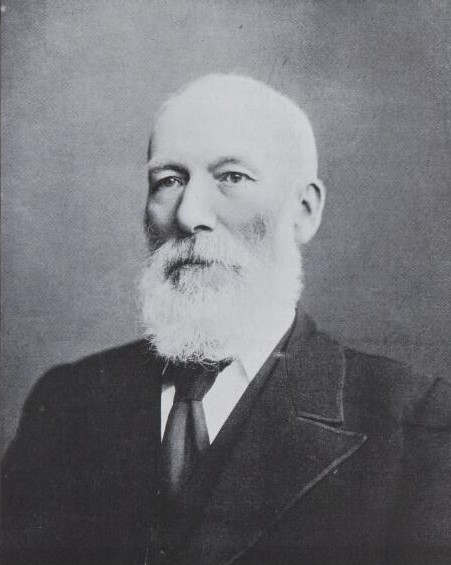

Member for Light

Member of the South Australian House of Assembly
- In office 12 Jun 1878 – 15 Apr 1881
- In office 23 Apr 1884 – 22 Mar 1887
- In office 25 Apr 1896 – 29 Apr 1899

Personal details
- Born: 18 November 1834 Magilligan, County Londonderry, Ireland
- Died: 4 May 1915, aged 81 Kapunda, South Australia
- Spouse: Charlotte Wilson
- Relations: Howard Huntley Shannon (great nephew)
- Children: 14
- Occupation: Farmer
- Relations

David Moody (18 November 1834 – 4 May 1915) served three terms as a member of the South Australian House of Assembly for the Electoral district of Light. Moody was initially elected on 12 June 1878 to fill the vacancy created by the resignation of Frank Skeffington Carroll on 31 May 1878. While Moody was not successful in the 1881 elections, he was re-elected along with Jenkin Coles on 23 April 1884. Moody was not re-elected in 1887. Then, in 1896, Moody stood again and was re-elected along the Hon. Sir Jenkin Coles on 25 April 1896.

In 1903, the Hundred of Moody, a cadastral division located in the southern part of the Eyre Peninsula in South Australia, was named in Moody's honour.

South Australian House of Assembly
Preceded by Frank Carroll	Member for Light; 1878–1881; With: James White; James Shannon	Succeeded by Jenkin Coles; Henry Moyle; Robert Dixson
Preceded by Jenkin Coles; Henry Moyle; Robert Dixson	Member for Light; 1884–1887; With: Jenkin Coles	Succeeded by Jenkin Coles; Paddy Glynn
Preceded by Jenkin Coles; James White	Member for Light; 1896–1899; With: Jenkin Coles	Succeeded by Jenkin Coles; Friedrich Paech
