= Electoral results for the district of Ngadjuri =

South Australian district election results

This is a list of electoral results for the Electoral district of Ngadjuri in South Australian state elections from the district's first election in 2026 until the present.

== Members for Ngadjuri ==
Member	Party	Term
David Paton	One Nation	2026–present

== Election results ==
=== Elections in the 2020s ===
==== 2026 ====
2026 South Australian state election: Ngadjuri
Party	Candidate	Votes	%	±%
One Nation	David Paton	8,499	34.9	+23.9
Labor	Tony Piccolo	7,186	29.5	+3.9
Liberal	Penny Pratt	6,161	25.3	−19.7
Greens	Danielle Every	1,125	4.6	+4.6
Legalise Cannabis	Mark Lobban	455	1.9	+1.9
Animal Justice	Cherie Steele	396	1.6	+1.6
Family First	Sharon Pearce	358	1.5	+1.5
Australian Family	Jonathan Jenkins	109	0.4	+0.4
Fair Go	Shari Olsson	90	0.4	+0.4
Total formal votes		24,379	95.9	−0.4
Informal votes		1,033	4.1	+0.4
Turnout		25,412	90.7	+0.1
Two-party-preferred result
One Nation	David Paton	13,944	57.1	+57.1
Labor	Tony Piccolo	10,496	42.9	+1.0
One Nation gain from Liberal				
