= Henry Vivian Moyle =

Australian politician

Henry Vivian Moyle (1841 – 16 May 1925) was a politician in the Colony of South Australia.

Moyle was born in Camborne, Cornwall, and emigrated to South Australia in 1860. He took over the Sir John Franklin Hotel at Kapunda, then sold up and went into partnership with Joseph Downing (c. 1827 – 20 July 1911) as Downing & Moyle, hotel brokers and financial agents with offices in Waymouth Street.

He represented Light in the South Australian House of Assembly from April 1881 to April 1884, with colleagues Jenkin Coles and Robert Dixson. He was a member of the Glenelg Municipal Council from 1895 to around 1917.

== Family ==
He married Martha Waters (c. 1845 – 6 July 1925) of Kapunda on 30 October 1864; they lived in Brighton then on the Bay Road (now Anzac Highway), Glenelg.

- Their adopted daughter Lena Moyle married Harold Angwin Carruthers on 20 November 1912.

South Australian House of Assembly
Preceded by James White; James Shannon; David Moody	Member for Light; 1881–1884; With: Jenkin Coles; Robert Dixson	Succeeded by Jenkin Coles; David Moody
