= Frank Carroll =

Frank Carroll may refer to:

- Frank Carroll (figure skater) (1938–2024), American figure skating coach
- Frank Carroll (ice hockey) (1879–1938), Canadian ice hockey coach
- Frank Carroll (Queensland politician) (born 1952), Australian politician
- Frank Skeffington Carroll (c. 1837–1887), fraudster, editor, and (briefly) politician in South Australia
- Frank Carroll (Arizona politician), member of the Arizona House of Representatives
- Frankie Carroll (born 1970), Irish hurler
