= Jenkin Coles =

Australian politician

The Honourable Sir Jenkin Coles KCMG
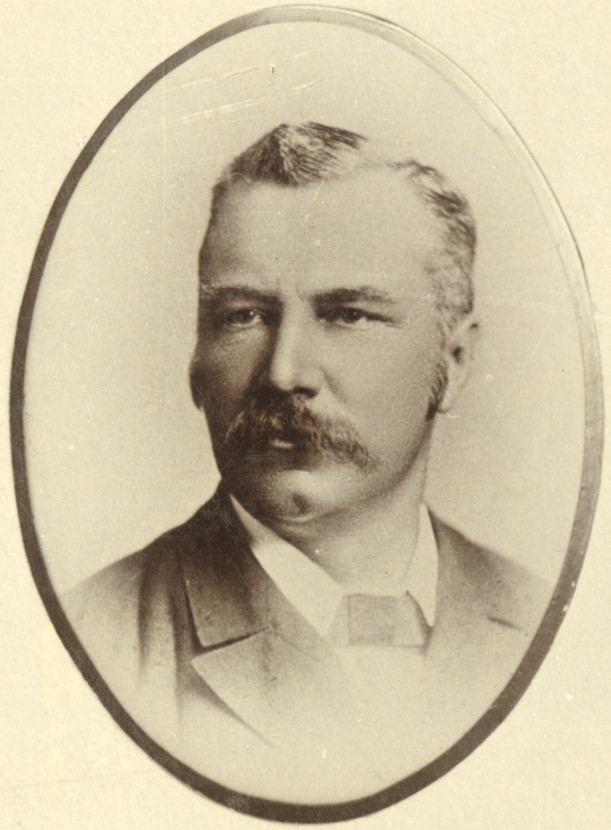

6th Speaker of the South Australian House of Assembly
- In office 5 June 1890 – 17 November 1911
- Preceded by: John Cox Bray
- Succeeded by: Harry Jackson

4th Leader of the Opposition (SA)
- In office 1886–1886
- Preceded by: John Downer
- Succeeded by: Thomas Playford II

Personal details
- Born: 19 January 1843
- Died: 6 December 1911
- Party: National Defence League (1902-1910); Liberal Union (from 1910)
- Website: Former Member Page

Sir Jenkin Coles KCMG (19 January 1843 – 6 December 1911) was a South Australian politician. He was a member of the South Australian House of Assembly from 1875 to 1878 and 1881 to 1911, representing the electorates of Light (1875–78, 1881–1902) and Wooroora (1902–1911). He was Leader of the Opposition from 1886 to 1887 and later served as Speaker of the House of Assembly from 1890 to 1911.

Political offices
Preceded by Thomas Playford II	Commissioner of Public Works; 1885 (4 Feb – 16 Jun)	Succeeded by John Darling
Preceded by John Downer	Leader of the Opposition of South Australia; 1886–1887	Succeeded by Thomas Playford
South Australian House of Assembly
Preceded by John Bray	Speaker of the South Australian House of Assembly; 1890–1911	Succeeded by Harry Jackson
Preceded by James Pearce; Randolph Stow	Member for Light; 1875–1878; Served alongside: James White, David Nock	Succeeded by James Shannon; Frank Carroll
Preceded by James White; James Shannon; David Moody	Member for Light; 1881–1902; With: Henry Moyle / David Moody / Paddy Glynn / Friedrich Paech; Robert Dixson / none	District abolished
Preceded by James McLachlan; John Castine	Member for Wooroora; 1902–1911; With: David James; Friedrich Paech / Frederick Young	Succeeded by Oscar Duhst
