= James Wharton White =

Australian politician (1857-1930)

James Wharton White (17 February 1857 – 30 January 1930), often referred to as "Wharton White", was an auctioneer, pastoralist and politician in colonial South Australia. He spent the latter half of his life in Western Australia.

He was born the eldest son of Abraham White (c. 1828 – 15 May 1885), farmer and railway contractor of "Illawarra", Bagot's Well, and his wife Mary, née Wharton, ( – c. 1931). His uncle James "Nobby" White (c. 1820–1890) was a pastoralist and noted politician.

He was educated at James Hosking's Gouger Street Academy, and was four years with John McLaren in the auctioneering firm McLaren, White & Co.

He ran a sheep station some 30 miles (48 km) north of Pinnaroo.

In 1881 he was involved in a complex legal argument, which went as far as the Court of Appeal in England, with John "Jack" Neaylon over ownership of the lease later known as Appatoongannie. White and his partner Thomas Neaylon (John's brother) lost.

He represented the Assembly seat of Light from April 1890 to April 1896 as colleague of Jenkin Coles.

In 1894 he paid a six-month visit to the Western Australian goldfields, and at the Kurnalpie field near Coolgardie, staked a claim with one Mr. Thring, and was immediately rewarded with a useful haul of the precious metal, but found nothing at lower depths. On returning to South Australia, he purchased, with Alexander Poynton and James Henderson Howe, from Frank Denford of Mount Serle Station, the lease to the "Angipena Treasure Mine", which had been fraudulently "salted".

He left South Australia for Western Australia sometime before 1897, when he settled in Esperance. He was for a time employed as Rabbit Fence Inspector, and died in the Esperance Hospital.

== Family ==
James Wharton White (17 February 1857 – 30 January 1930) married Sophie Agnes Geier in Kapunda. He married again, in Kalgoorlie, to Mary Gycer. Among their children were:

- Arthur Wharton White (29 March 1886 – 21 July 1955) married Elise May Jones on 28 May 1914 in Kalgoorlie, WA. He was a fettler with the Western Australian railways
- James Wharton White (c. 1899 – 14 December 1975) married Jessie Dalrymple Aitken (13 November 1913 – 28 July 1995) on 17 January 1931
