= Electoral district of Ngadjuri =

South Australian state electoral district

Ngadjuri South Australia—House of Assembly
- Interactive map of electoral district boundaries from the 2026 state election
- State: South Australia
- Created: 2026
- MP: David Paton
- Party: One Nation
- Namesake: Aboriginal word for "we people"
- Electors: 28,021 (2026)
- Area: 6,386 km^{2} (2,465.6 sq mi)
- Demographic: Rural
- Coordinates: 33°50′0″S 138°36′0″E
Electorates around Ngadjuri:
	Stuart
Narungga	Ngadjuri	Chaffey
Taylor	Light	Schubert

Ngadjuri is a single-member electoral district for the South Australian House of Assembly. A rural district in Mid North region, it runs from the Gawler River and Gulf St Vincent in the south, through farming areas, to Clare in the north. It includes towns of Two Wells, Dublin, Mallala, Wasleys, Roseworthy, Freeling, Hamley Bridge, Owen, Tarlee, Riverton, Marrabel, Marrabel, Kapunda, Point Pass, Eudunda, Saddleworth, Auburn, Manoora, Robertstown, Robertstown and Watervale.

The electorate was created in the 2024 redistribution of electoral boundaries and was first contested at the 2026 election. A reconfigured version of Frome, its name "Ngadjuri", is a Aboriginal word meaning "we people".

A significant redrawing of the boundaries occurred between Frome and Ngadjuri with the electorate gaining around 3,200 voters from Light near Gawler and losing around 3,600 voters in the Northern Areas Council, including Jamestown and Spalding, as well as part of the Regional Council of Goyder to Stuart. Also 1,650 voters in Watchman, Balaklava, South Australia, Dalkley, Hoskin Corner and Erith were transferred into Narungga. Ngadjuri lost conservative areas in the north and gained Labor-leaning areas near Gawler, significantly cutting the Liberal margin from 8.1 to 3.2 per cent.

The 2026 election was contested by Tony Piccolo, the Deputy Speaker of the House of Assembly and the Labor MP for the neighbouring seat of Light and sitting Liberal MP for Frome, Penny Pratt. Both were defeated by the One Nation candidate, the Deputy Mayor of the Adelaide Plains Council, David Paton.

== Members for Ngadjuri ==
Member	Party	Term
David Paton	One Nation	2026–present

== Election results ==
2026 South Australian state election: Ngadjuri
Party	Candidate	Votes	%	±%
One Nation	David Paton	8,499	34.9	+23.9
Labor	Tony Piccolo	7,186	29.5	+3.9
Liberal	Penny Pratt	6,161	25.3	−19.7
Greens	Danielle Every	1,125	4.6	+4.6
Legalise Cannabis	Mark Lobban	455	1.9	+1.9
Animal Justice	Cherie Steele	396	1.6	+1.6
Family First	Sharon Pearce	358	1.5	+1.5
Australian Family	Jonathan Jenkins	109	0.4	+0.4
Fair Go	Shari Olsson	90	0.4	+0.4
Total formal votes		24,379	95.9	−0.4
Informal votes		1,033	4.1	+0.4
Turnout		25,412	90.7	+0.1
Two-candidate-preferred result
One Nation	David Paton	13,944	57.1	+57.1
Labor	Tony Piccolo	10,496	42.9	+1.0
One Nation gain from Liberal				
