= Deputy Speaker and Chairman of Committees of the South Australian House of Assembly =

Chairman of Committees and Deputy Speaker of the House of Assembly Parliament of South Australia
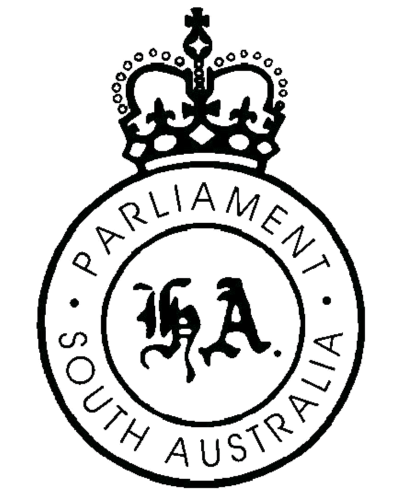
- Crest of the House of Assembly

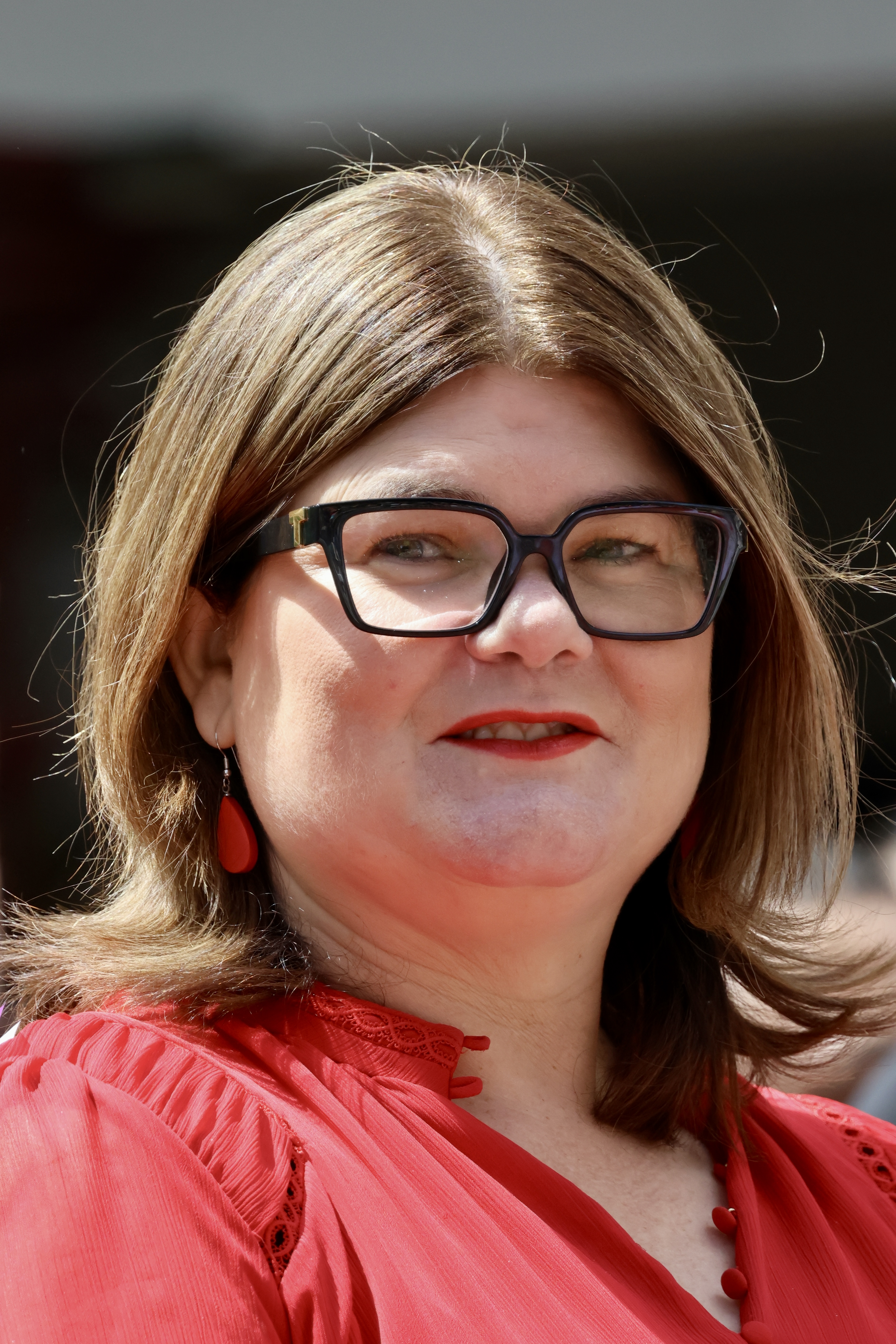
- Incumbent; Zoe Bettison
- Style: Madam/Mr. Deputy Speaker (whilst presiding); Madam/Mr. Chairman (In committee)
- Status: Deputy Presiding officer of the House and Presiding officer of the Committee of the whole
- Reports to: Speaker of the House
- Appointer: Elected by the House of Assembly
- Term length: With the confidence of the House or until resignation
- Constituting instrument: Constitution Act 1934
- Formation: 12 May 1875
- First holder: John Carr
- Salary: $256,575 (including $186,600 salary + 37.5%)
- Website: Official website

Officially the Chairman of Committees but also known informally known as the Deputy Speaker of the South Australian House of Assembly is the deputy presiding officer of the South Australian House of Assembly, the lower house of the Parliament of South Australia with the Speaker of the South Australian House of Assembly being the senior presiding officer of that chamber.

The Chairman of Committees and Deputy Speaker is elected by the Members of the House of Assembly to preside when the House forms itself into a Committee of the Whole of the membership of the House to consider Bills, or during a period where the Speaker of the South Australian House of Assembly is absent in the chamber.

The current Deputy Speaker and Chairman of Committees is Labor MP Zoe Bettison who was elected following the 2026 South Australian state election and the unsuccessful re-election of then-incumbent Deputy Speaker, Tony Piccolo.

== List of deputy speakers ==
Prior to the election of the first Deputy Speaker in 1875, the functions of Chairman of Committees was undertaken by the Speaker.

Order	Member	Party	Term commence	Term end	Term in office
1	John Carr	Pre-party system	12 May 1875	22 June 1878	1 year, 41 days
2	William Townsend	Pre-party system	22 June 1878	31 October 1882	6 years, 131 days
3	Luke Furner	Pre-party system	31 October 1882	5 June 1884	1 year, 218 days
4	Ebenezer Ward	Pre-party system	5 June 1884	5 June 1890	6 years, 0 days
5	Alfred Catt	Liberal Country League	5 June 1890	20 July 1905	15 years, 45 days
6	Ephraim Henry Coombe	Liberal and Democratic Union	20 July 1905	27 July 1909	4 years, 7 days
7	Alexander McDonald	National Defence League	20 July 1909	2 June 1910	317 days
8	Harry Jackson	Labor	2 June 1910	17 November 1911	1 year, 168 days
9	John Newland	Labor	17 November 1911 (acting); 21 November 1911 (elected)	19 March 1912	123 days
10	Samuel Bruce Rudall	Liberal Country League	19 March 1912	8 July 1915	3 years, 111 days
11	Henry Chesson	Labor (until 1917); National Party (from 1917)	8 July 1915	25 July 1918	3 years, 17 days
12	George Richards Laffer	Liberal Country League	25 July 1918	8 April 1920 (resigned)	1 year, 258 days
13	William Angus	Liberal Country League	29 July 1920	21 July 1921	357 days
14	Vernon Gordon Petherick	Liberal Country League	21 July 1921	24 July 1924	3 years, 3 days
15	Robert Stanley Richards	Labor	24 July 1924	17 May 1927	2 years, 297 days
16	Robert Dove Nicholls	Liberal Country League	17 May 1927	27 May 1930	13 years, 10 days
17	Frank Clement Staniford	Labor	27 May 1930	12 February 1933 (resigned)	2 years, 261 days
18	Henry Burgess Crosby	Liberal Country League	6 July 1933	19 May 1938	4 years, 317 days
19	Reginald John Rudall	Liberal Country League	19 May 1938	5 November 1939 (resigned)	1 year, 170 days
20	Henry Stephen Dunks	Liberal Country League	8 November 1939	22 March 1955 (died in office)	15 years, 134 days
21	Berthold Teusner	Liberal Country League	19 May 1955	8 May 1956	355 days
22	Colin Rosslyn Dunnage	Liberal Country League	8 May 1956	12 April 1962	5 years, 339 days
23	Berthold Teusner	Liberal Country League	12 April 1962	13 May 1965	3 years, 31 days
24	Samuel James Lawn	Labor	13 May 1965	16 April 1968	2 years, 339 days
25	Berthold Teusner	Liberal Country League	16 April 1968	14 July 1970	2 years, 89 days
26	Samuel James Lawn	Labor	14 July 1970	25 May 1971 (died in office)	315 days
27	John Richard Ryan	Labor	13 July 1971	19 June 1973	1 year, 341 days
28	Allan Burdon	Labor	19 June 1973	5 August 1975	2 years, 47 days
29	Gil Langley	Labor	5 August 1975	6 October 1977	2 years, 62 days
30	Gavin Francis Keneally	Labor	6 October 1977	11 October 1979	2 years, 5 days
31	Graham Gunn	Liberal	11 October 1979	8 December 1982	3 years, 58 days
32	Maxwell John Brown	Labor	8 December 1982	11 February 1986	3 years, 65 days
33	Donald Mervyn Ferguson	Labor	11 February 1986	8 February 1990	3 years, 362 days
34	Martyn John Evans	Labor	8 February 1990	7 October 1992 (resigned)	2 years, 242 days
35	Donald Mervyn Ferguson	Labor	7 October 1992	10 February 1994	1 year, 126 days
36	Harold Allison	Liberal	10 February 1994	2 December 1997	3 years, 295 days
37	David Wotton	Liberal	2 December 1997	5 March 2002	4 years, 93 days
38	Robert Bruce Such	Independent	5 March 2002	4 April 2005 (resigned)	3 years, 30 days
39	Jack Snelling	Labor	4 April 2005	27 April 2006	1 year, 23 days
40	Gay Thompson	Labor	27 April 2006	6 May 2010	4 years, 9 days
41	Chloe Fox	Labor	6 May 2010	21 October 2011 (resigned)	1 year, 168 days
42	Tony Piccolo	Labor	8 November 2011	21 January 2013 (resigned)	1 year, 74 days
43	Frances Bedford	Labor (until 27 March 2017); Independent (from 27 March 2017)	6 May 2014	3 May 2018	3 years, 361 days
44	Peter Treloar	Liberal	3 May 2018	3 May 2022	3 years, 334 days
45	Tony Piccolo	Labor	3 May 2022	21 March 2026 (not re-elected)	3 years, 322 days (Two term total 5 years, 31 days)
46	Zoe Bettison	Labor	5 May 2026	incumbent	125 days
