= Electoral results for the district of Young (South Australia) =

South Australian district election results

This is a list of election results for the electoral district of Young in South Australian elections.

== Members for Young ==
Member	Party	Term
Robert Nicholls	Liberal and Country	1938–1956

== Election results ==
=== Elections in the 1950s ===
1953 South Australian state election: Young
Party	Candidate	Votes	%	±%
Liberal and Country	Robert Nicholls	unopposed		
Liberal and Country hold		Swing		

1950 South Australian state election: Young
Party	Candidate	Votes	%	±%
Liberal and Country	Robert Nicholls	unopposed		
Liberal and Country hold		Swing		

=== Elections in the 1940s ===
1947 South Australian state election: Young
Party	Candidate	Votes	%	±%
Liberal and Country	Robert Nicholls	unopposed		
Liberal and Country hold		Swing		

1944 South Australian state election: Young
Party	Candidate	Votes	%	±%
Liberal and Country	Robert Nicholls	2,576	69.4	−30.6
Labor	Ernest Allen	1,134	30.6	+30.6
Total formal votes		3,710	97.4	
Informal votes		100	2.6	
Turnout		3,810	91.4	
Liberal and Country hold		Swing	N/A	

1941 South Australian state election: Young
Party	Candidate	Votes	%	±%
Liberal and Country	Robert Nicholls	unopposed		
Liberal and Country hold		Swing		

=== Elections in the 1930s ===
1938 South Australian state election: Young
Party	Candidate	Votes	%	±%
Liberal and Country	Robert Nicholls	2,111	63.7	
Independent	Leonard Young	733	22.1	
Independent	Herman Dolling	468	14.1	
Total formal votes		3,312	97.9	
Informal votes		70	2.1	
Turnout		3,382	70.5	
Liberal and Country hold		Swing		

- Preferences were not distributed.
