= David Nock =

Australian politician

David Nock (20 September 1828 – 16 June 1909) was a member of the South Australian Parliament, remembered for introducing a Bill ("Nock's Act") forcing licensed premises to close on Sundays.

== History ==
Nock was born on 20 September 1828. He arrived in South Australia September 1844 with his parents Thomas and Maria Nock and siblings aboard Emma from Sydney. In 1860 he settled in Kapunda, where he operated a small general store. He was a prominent member of the Methodist Church and for many years superintendent of the Sunday-school. He was a member of the town council and served as mayor of Kapunda for the years 1869 and 1870. In 1875 he was elected one of the three representatives for the district of Light in the House of Assembly, his colleagues being Jenkin Coles and James White.

In 1876 he introduced a Bill to amend the Licensed Victuallers Act to prohibit serving of liquor on a Sunday. It became law but was recognised by a later parliament as a form of Sabbatarianism rather than a measure to promote temperance, and was reversed in 1878.

He was appointed Justice of the Peace in 1872. and around 1874 retired to Glenelg, where he died on 16 June 1909 (aged 80).

== Family ==
Nock married Sarah Fanny (died 1895) in 1849; their children include:

- Thomas David Nock (1850–1922) was Mayor of Kapunda 1890.
- Sarah Jane Nock (1852– ) married William Taylor in 1874
- William James Nock (1856–1934) married Annie in 1879
- Emily Maria Nock (1867– ) married William George Clarke in 1887
