= Anthony Piccolo =

Anthony or Tony Piccolo may refer to:

- Anthony Piccolo (seaQuest DSV), a character on the American TV series seaQuest DSV
- Tony Piccolo (born 1960), Australian politician
