= John Shannon (politician) =

Australian politician (1862–1926)

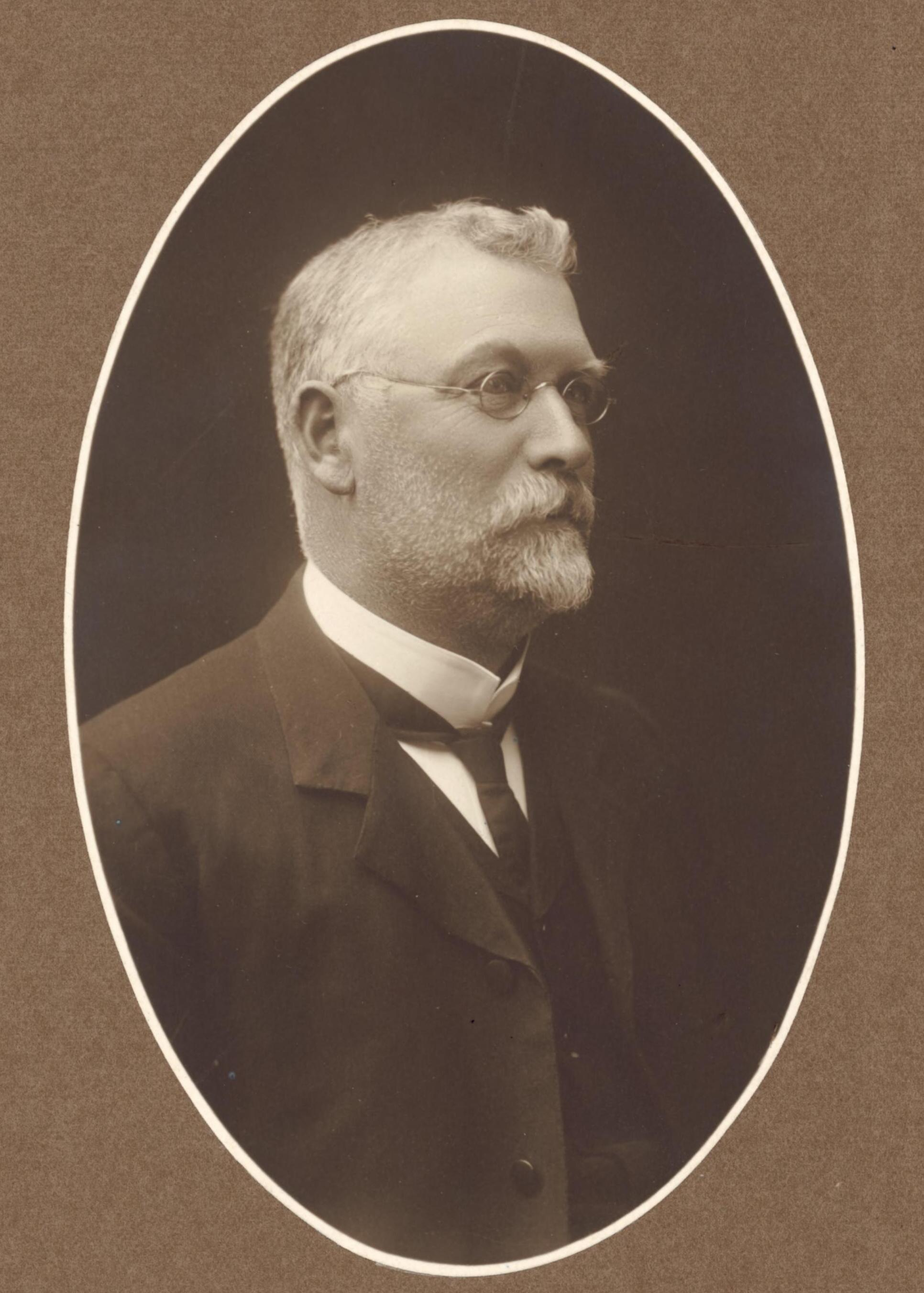

Senator for South Australia
- In office 31 July 1912 – 30 June 1913
- Preceded by: William Russell
- In office 5 September 1914 – 30 June 1920

Member of the South Australian House of Assembly
- In office 25 Apr 1896 – 2 May 1902
- Constituency: Yorke Peninsula
- In office 3 May 1902 – 26 May 1905
- Constituency: Wallaroo

Personal details
- Born: 28 April 1862 Moculta, South Australia
- Died: 30 January 1926 (aged 63) Norwood, South Australia
- Party: Liberal (1912–17); Nationalist (1917–20)
- Spouse(s): Grace Moody (1864–1890); Alice Jane Moody (1859–1938)
- Relations: David Shannon (uncle); James Shannon (half-uncle)
- Children: Howard Huntley Shannon (son); David Shannon (grandson)
- Occupation: Farmer, auctioneer

John Wallace Shannon (28 April 1862 – 30 January 1926) was an Australian politician. Born in Angaston, South Australia, where he was educated, he became a farmer on the Yorke Peninsula and an auctioneer. He served on Maitland Council, of which he was mayor. In 1896, he was elected to the South Australian House of Assembly for Yorke Peninsula, transferring to Wallaroo in 1902. He left the Assembly in 1905. In 1912, he was appointed to the Australian Senate as a Liberal Senator for South Australia, filling the casual vacancy caused by the death of Labor Senator William Russell. This was the first time a state government had successfully replaced a Senator with a Senator of a different party, after Labor's failed attempt in 1907 to appoint James O'Loghlin to succeed Joseph Vardon. Defeated in 1913, he was elected in 1914 (with over 95% of the vote) due to the death of Labor Senator Gregor McGregor, which left the Labor Party with only five nominees. They directed the sixth vote to Shannon, resulting in an easy return to the Senate with 96.!% of the vote. He joined the Nationalist Party when it formed in 1917, and from 1917 to 1920 served as Chairman of Committees. Shannon did not stand at the 1919 federal election, and his term ended on 30 June 1920.

He died in 1926.
