= Abe Shannon =

Australian pastoralist and philanthropist

Abraham Shannon OBE (15 March 1869 – 24 October 1945) was a pastoralist in South Australia, a substantial donor to philanthropic and patriotic causes.

== History ==
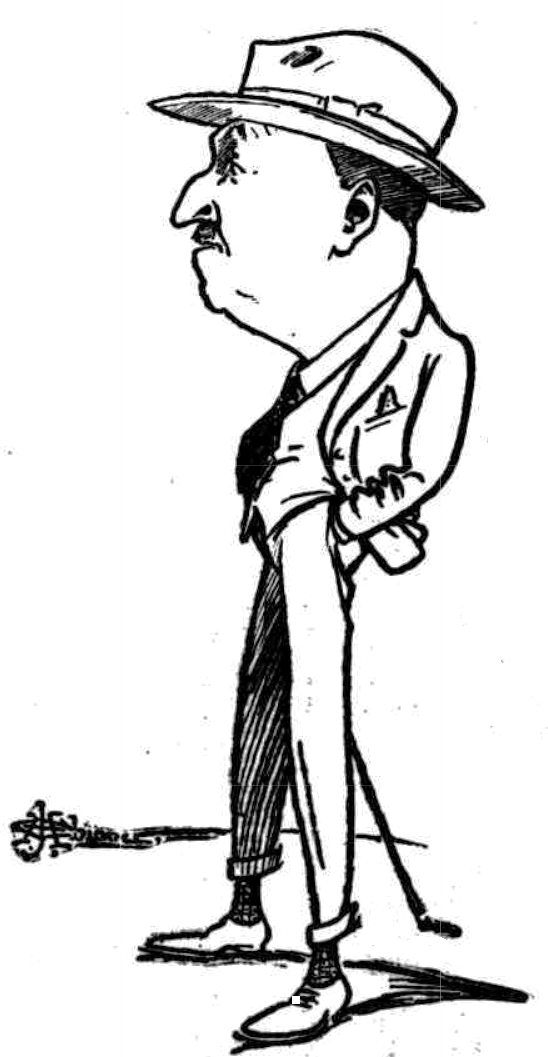
Caricature by J. H. Chinner

Shannon was born at Stockwell, South Australia to David Shannon MHA (1822–1875) and his second wife Martha Shannon, née Davison (c. 1827–1917). He was educated at Whinham College and was a successful pastoralist, concentrating on wheat and sheep.

He died suddenly at his property, "Kingscourt", (Note: Perhaps named for the town of Kingscourt, County Cavan, Ireland, his mother's birthplace.) near Eudunda, at the age of 76.

== Contributions ==
His contributions to philanthropic and patriotic causes include:

- During the Boer War he visited South Africa to investigate the conditions of sick and wounded troops, and paid for their hotel accommodation in Cape Town and Durban and other expenses incurred while recuperating.
- During the Great War, having been rejected for active service, he went to England at his own expense and did voluntary war work, going to France, and working at many of the hospitals, with the honorary rank of captain in the Australian Red Cross.
- He donated the prize for Eudunda's annual band competitions.
- He provided the funds in 1929 to set up a new school in the district.
- He started a memorial fund for Anderson and Hitchcock, who died while searching for Charles Kingsford Smith, who had been reported missing. (Anderson had been forced by engine trouble to land his 'plane "Kookaburra" in the Tanami Desert and subsequently perished.) Shannon considered Anderson's risky search for his once-friend particularly noble.

He never married and had no children. His estate was valued at between £35,000 and £40,000 (many tens of millions in today's currency). In his will he left:

- £100 each to Returned Sailors and Soldiers Imperial League of Australia (SA branch), Legacy Club of Adelaide; Toc H (South Australia); Adelaide Children's Hospital; Tubercular Soldiers' Aid Society; Angorichina Blinded Soldiers Association of SA; Boy Scouts Association of SA; Salvation Army; Australian Inland Mission (specifically for the Flying Doctors); SA Institution for the Blind and Deaf and Dumb at Brighton; and Congregational Church at Truro.
- £50 each to 5CL ("Twinkler") Boys' Club and Girl Guides' Association of SA.
- His gold tiepin with diamonds and ruby crown to the Premier, Thomas Playford.

He was awarded the OBE for his services, and was presented to King Edward VII.

In 1929 he was awarded the Returned Soldiers' League certificate of merit, the highest honor given to non-members.

== Family ==
- David Shannon MHA (28 March 1822 – 9 September 1875) followed his brother Abraham Shannon to South Australia, arriving in either 1838, 1839, or on John Pirie in 1843. died at "Yatara", near Stockwell, South Australia between Kapunda and Truro. He married twice, had five sons and two daughters. By first wife Sarah née Kelly (died 8 August 1860):

- William Moore Shannon (c. 1856 – 24 April 1940) married Janet Inglis Kelly (10 August 1855 – 14 November 1913) in 1880
- James Kelly Shannon ( – June 1922) married Christina Scott (c. 1859 – 6 October 1950) on 1 September 1881
He married again, to Martha Davison (c. 1827 – 12 April 1917) on 19 March 1861
- Sarah Shannon (10 March 1863 – 20 November 1941) married Arnold E. Davey on 20 June 1883
- Jane Shannon (11 October 1864 – ) married Hermann Carl Koeppen-Wendt in 1889
- David Hopkins Shannon, a.k.a. David Shannon jr., (1 June 1866 – 12 November 1944) married Margaret Isabel Goodchild (died around 1924). He purchased the famous Coalbrook Vale stud (home of Auraria) from David James, renamed it "Alba Vale".
- Abraham "Abe" Shannon (15 March 1869 – 24 October 1945)
- Robert Shannon (5 April 1871 – 1961) married Amy Jane Holbrook (1870 – 23 August 1945), daughter of John Daykin Holbrook of Underdale, on 26 February 1895.
- Maria Pauline Sophie Shannon (1874– )

See David Shannon for a more extensive list of family members.
