= Electoral district of Light =

South Australian state electoral district

Light South Australia—House of Assembly
- Interactive map of electoral district boundaries
- State: South Australia
- Dates current: 1857–1902, 1938–present
- MP: James Agness
- Party: Labor
- Namesake: Colonel William Light
- Electors: 29,303 (2026)
- Area: 54.2 km^{2} (20.9 sq mi)
- Demographic: Rural
Electorates around Light:
Ngadjuri	Ngadjuri	Schubert
Ngadjuri	Light	Schubert
Taylor	Taylor	Elizabeth

Footnotes
- Electoral District map

Light is a single-member electoral district for the South Australian House of Assembly. Light is named after Colonel William Light (1786 – 1839), who was the first Surveyor-General of South Australia. The electorate was created in 1857, abolished at the 1902 election and recreated at the 1938 election. It is based on the township of Gawler, and stretches southwards into the outer northern metropolitan suburbs of Adelaide in the City of Playford. Although Adelaide's northern suburbs have spilled into Gawler, Light has traditionally been counted as a non-metropolitan seat.

Light consists of the suburbs of Buchfelde, Evanston Gardens, Evanston Park, Evanston South, Gawler, Gawler East, Gawler South, Gawler West, Hewett, Hillier, Kudla, Munno Para, Munno Para Downs, Munno Para West, Reid, and Willaston.

== History ==
The electorate was held by the Liberal Party and its predecessor, the Liberal and Country League, for all but one term from its re-creation in 1938 until 2006. For most of that time, it was a fairly safe to safe LCL/Liberal seat.

The electorate's first member in its current incarnation as a single-member seat was Premier and LCL founder Richard Layton Butler, who held the electorate for a few months in 1938 before making an unsuccessful attempt to transfer to federal politics. Other particularly notable members include Bruce Eastick, leader of the LCL/Liberals from 1972 to 1975 and Speaker of the South Australian House of Assembly during the Tonkin government who held the seat for 23 years until his retirement in 1993.

A redistribution prior to the 2002 election pushed Light further into the outer northern Adelaide suburbs, paring back the margin from a fairly safe 6.3 percent to an extremely marginal 1.1 percent. At the 2002 election, Liberal incumbent Malcolm Buckby defeated Labor's Annette Hurley, the Deputy Leader of the Opposition, who attempted to change seat from Napier, by picking up a small swing in his favour and retained the electorate even as the Liberals lost government.

In 2006 Tony Piccolo became the second Labor member to win the electorate when he defeated the incumbent of 13 years Malcolm Buckby, and the first Labor member for the electorate in 62 years. At the 2010 election he increased his margin against the statewide trend and decades of voting patterns in the seat, and became the first Labor member to be re-elected to Light. His victory was one of two that allowed Labor to hold onto a narrow majority despite losing the two-party vote.

A redistribution prior to the 2014 election reduced Labor's margin significantly from 5.3 percent to 2.8 percent, but Labor again retained the electorate with an unchanged margin. After a redistribution slightly increased the Labor margin to 5.4 percent, Piccolo retained the seat in 2018 with a healthy swing of almost six percent, enough to make Light a fairly safe Labor seat (and just on the edge of being safe). This came even as Labor lost government, marking only the second time that the conservatives won government without holding Light.

== Members ==
Two members (1857–1875)
Member	Party	Term	Member	Party	Term
J. T. Bagot		1857–1865	Carrington Smedley		1857–1857
J. T. Bagot		1857–1865	William Maturin		1858–1858
J. T. Bagot		1857–1865	David Shannon		1858–1860
J. T. Bagot		1857–1865	Francis Dutton		1860–1862
J. T. Bagot		1857–1865	John Rowe		1862–1862
J. T. Bagot		1857–1865	Francis Dutton		1862–1865
P. B. Coglin		1865–1868	John Rounsevell		1865–1868
John Hart Sr.		1868–1870	William Lewis		1868–1870
Edward Hamilton		1870–1871	James Pearce		1870–1875
James White		1871–1871	James Pearce		1870–1875
Mountifort Conner		1871–1873	James Pearce		1870–1875
R. I. Stow		1873–1875	James Pearce		1870–1875

Three members (1875–1884)
Member	Party	Term	Member	Party	Term	Member	Party	Term
James White		1875–1881	David Nock		1875–1878	Jenkin Coles		1875–1878
James White		1875–1881	James Shannon		1878–1881	F. S. Carroll		1878–1878
James White		1875–1881	James Shannon		1878–1881	David Moody		1878–1881
Jenkin Coles		1881–1884	H. V. Moyle		1881–1884	Robert Dixson		1881–1884

Two members (1884–1902)
Member	Party	Term	Member	Party	Term
Jenkin Coles		1884–1891	David Moody		1884–1887
Jenkin Coles		1884–1891	Paddy Glynn		1887–1890
Jenkin Coles		1884–1891	J. W. White		1890–1891
Jenkin Coles	Defence League	1891–1896	J. W. White	Defence League	1891–1896
Jenkin Coles		1896–1902	David Moody		1896–1899
Jenkin Coles		1896–1902	F. W. Paech		1899–1902

Single-member (1938–present)
Member	Party	Term
Richard Layton Butler	Liberal and Country	1938–1938
Herbert Michael	Liberal and Country	1939–1941
Sydney McHugh	Labor	1941–1944
Herbert Michael	Liberal and Country	1944–1956
George Hambour	Liberal and Country	1956–1960
Leslie Nicholson	Liberal and Country	1960–1962
John Freebairn	Liberal and Country	1962–1970
Bruce Eastick	Liberal and Country	1970–1974
Bruce Eastick	Liberal	1974–1993
Malcolm Buckby	Liberal	1993–2006
Tony Piccolo	Labor	2006–2026
James Agness	Labor	2026–present

== Election results ==
2026 South Australian state election: Light
Party	Candidate	Votes	%	±%
Labor	James Agness	8,889	36.9	−20.6
One Nation	Alexander Banks	8,327	34.5	+27.7
Liberal	Andrew Williamson	2,961	12.3	−11.6
Greens	James Scalzi	2,174	9.0	2.4
Family First	Jacinta Roberts	837	3.5	−1.7
Legalise Cannabis	Liam Morgan	663	2.7	+2.7
Australian Family	Dan Hale	260	1.1	+1.1
Total formal votes		24,111	96.0	−1.0
Informal votes		1,004	4.0	+1.0
Turnout		25,115	85.7	−2.4
Two-candidate-preferred result
Labor	James Agness	12,445	51.6	−17.9
One Nation	Alex Banks	11,658	48.4	+48.4
Labor hold				
