= William Russell (Australian politician) =

Australian politician

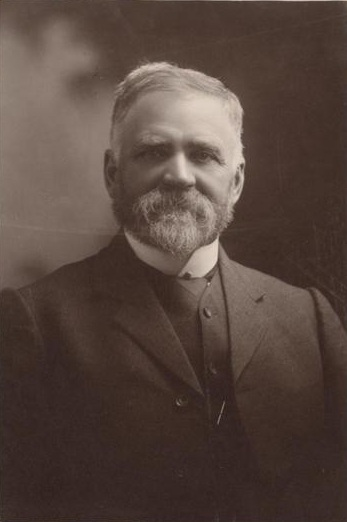

Senator for South Australia
- In office 1 January 1907 – 28 June 1912
- Succeeded by: John Shannon

Personal details
- Born: 20 October 1842 Glassford, Lanarkshire, Scotland
- Died: 28 June 1912 (aged 69) Tumby Bay, South Australia
- Party: Labor
- Occupation: Solicitor

William Russell (20 October 1842 – 28 June 1912) was a Scottish-born Australian politician. He was a liberal member of the South Australian Legislative Council from 1895 to 1900 and an Australian Labor Party member of the South Australian House of Assembly (Burra) (1901–1902) and the Australian Senate (1906–1912).

== Early life ==
Russell was born in Glassford, Scotland, where he became a farm worker. In 1886, he migrated to South Australia, spending three years working on a farm at Alma Plains and three years as a selector at Gulnare Plains before establishing a larger property near Caltowie. He later farmed at Belton in the state's north, where better seasons saw him achieve more success than drought-affected predecessors, and finally near Belalie before retiring from farming in 1900. He was a District Council of Caltowie councillor for five years and a District Council of Carrieton councillor for three years, serving a term as Carrieton chairman. He was a member of the South Australian Farmers Union for many years and served a term as vice-president.

== Colonial politics ==
Russell was elected to the Legislative Council as a liberal for the North-Eastern District at the 1894 election. He supported women's suffrage, adult suffrage for the House of Assembly and an increased franchise for the Legislative Council. He was a member of a Taxation Commission investigating the state Taxation Department, and opposed the introduction of an income tax, viewing it as unjust. He sought re-election as a Labor candidate at the May 1900 election, but was defeated. Russell returned to politics a year later when he won a 1901 by-election for the House of Assembly seat of Burra upon the resignation of Frederick Holder, but lost his seat at the 1902 election. He unsuccessfully contested a Legislative Council by-election in 1903 and the 1905 election.

== Federal politics ==
Russell was elected to the Senate for the Labor Party at the 1906 federal election. The Observer wrote that "Russell was not a cultured speaker, but his addresses on the hustings and in Parliament were forceful, and characterized by a rugged native eloquence." In June 1912, he was campaigning with Alexander Poynton at Lipson when he began experiencing heart problems; he was taken to a private hospital at Tumby Bay, but died there on 28 June. He was buried at Payneham Cemetery. His death necessitated an appointment to replace him in the Senate; the South Australian Parliament, controlled by the Liberal Union, successfully installed Liberal John Shannon, the first instance when a Senator of a different party was appointed. (Note: The South Australian parliament had previously appointed James O'Loghlin (Labor) to replace Joseph Vardon (Anti-Socialist) however the High Court ruled the appointment was void as there was no casual vacancy. See Vardon v O'Loghlin.)
