= David Shannon (politician) =

Australian politician

Member of the South Australian House of Assembly
- In office 9 September 1858 – 18 March 1860
- Constituency: Light

Personal details
- Born: c. 1820
- Died: 9 September 1875 near Stockport, South Australia
- Relations: James Shannon (half-brother); John Shannon (nephew)
- Occupation: farmer

David Shannon (c. 1822 – 9 September 1875) served one term as a member of the South Australian House of Assembly for the Electoral district of Light from 9 September 1858 to 18 March 1860.

Shannon arrived in South Australia around 1842, following his brother Abraham Shannon. They farmed together until around 1856, when David took up "Yatara", near Stockwell (Stockport in some refs), where he died a few years after a fall from his horse and a subsequent infection which ended with a leg amputation.

== Family ==
David, his brother Abraham and four half-brothers migrated to South Australia around 1840–1850, though details are hard to find. Many are interred in the Shannon mausoleum, Truro.

- Abraham Shannon (18 February 1820 – 21 July 1875), who came out in either 1838, 1839, or on John Pirie in 1843; farmed at Mount Gould, east of Kersbrook, then "The Duckponds", Moculta. He married Eliza (died 1883) in 1847. They had nine children, including:

- Abraham Shannon (c. 1861 – 6 April 1907) married Jessie Currie Kelly ( – 15 March 1925) on 15 February 1883. He inherited his father's property.

- Abraham Kenneth Shannon (1883 – 8 January 1951)

- MHA and Senator John Wallace Shannon (1862–1926)

- Howard Huntley Shannon MHA (1892–1976)

- David John Shannon (1922–1993), RAAF, RAF pilot

- David Shannon MHA (28 March 1822 – 9 September 1875) arrived in SA 1840. He married twice, had five sons and two daughters. By first wife Sarah née Kelly (died 8 August 1860):

- William Moore Shannon (c. 1856 – 24 April 1940) married Janet Inglis Kelly (10 August 1855 – 14 November 1913) in 1880
- James Kelly Shannon ( – June 1922) married Christina Scott (c. 1859 – 6 October 1950) on 1 September 1881
He married again, to Martha Davison (c. 1827 – 12 April 1917) on 19 March 1861
- Sarah Shannon (10 March 1863 – 20 November 1941) married Arnold E. Davey on 20 June 1883
- Jane Shannon (11 October 1864 – ) married Hermann Carl Koeppen-Wendt in 1889
- David Hopkins Shannon, aka David Shannon jr., (1 June 1866 – 12 November 1944) married Margaret Isabel Goodchild (died around 1924). He purchased the famous Coalbrook Vale stud (home of Auraria) from David James, renamed it "Alba Vale".
- Abraham "Abe" Shannon (15 March 1869 – 24 October 1945)
- Robert Shannon (5 April 1871 – 1961) married Amy Jane Holbrook (1870 – 23 August 1945), daughter of John Daykin Holbrook of Underdale, on 26 February 1895.
- Maria Pauline Sophie Shannon (1874– )

Half-brothers:

- James Shannon MHA (c. 1840–1891)
- William Shannon (1842–1884)
- Edwin Shannon (1843–1860)
- Thomas Shannon (1850–1915)
- John Shannon (1857–1928 in US)

No clear family link has been found to David Shannon (c. 1854–1900) who married Mary Ann Scott Murray (1859–1929) on 25 July 1877, home "Murray Flats"; or to David Shannon who married Deborah Kelley at Kapunda on 30 December 1865.
