= James Agness =

Australian politician

James Agness MP

Member of the South Australian House of Assembly for Light
- Incumbent
- Assumed office 21 March 2026
- Preceded by: Tony Piccolo

Personal details
- Party: Labor

James Peter Agness is an Australian politician, and has represented the district of Light in the South Australian House of Assembly since the 2026 state election. Agness is a member of the Australian Labor Party, and prior to his election was a state policy advisor and ministerial chief of staff to Nick Champion.

== Career ==
Before standing for office, James Agness was an advisor to Peter Malinauskas during his tenure as leader of the opposition, and served as a ministerial advisor on the state level in the fields of road safety, correctional services, police, and health.

Agness was later a chief of staff to two state ministers — trade and investment minister Joe Szakacs and planning minister Nick Champion. He held the latter role in June 2025 when he was announced as the Labor candidate for the district of Light at the 2026 state election. The incumbent MP for Light was Tony Piccolo, a Labor member who instead sought election in the newly-created seat of Ngadjuri.

At the 2026 election, the result in Light was not immediately known, with the seat too close to call between Agness and the One Nation candidate, Alex Banks. Agness ultimately defeated Banks, becoming the MP for Light.

South Australian House of Assembly
Preceded by Tony Piccolo	Member for Light; 2026–present	Incumbent
