= Berthold Teusner =

Australian politician

The Honourable Sir Bert Teusner CMG
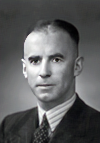

16th Speaker of the South Australian House of Assembly
- In office 9 May 1956 – 11 April 1962
- Preceded by: Robert Nicholls
- Succeeded by: Tom Stott

Member of the House of Assembly for Angas
- In office 10 June 1944 – 29 May 1970
- Preceded by: Reginald Rudall
- Succeeded by: Electorate abolished

Personal details
- Born: 16 May 1907
- Died: 7 August 1992 (aged 85) South Australia
- Party: Liberal and Country League
- Education: University of Adelaide
- Occupation: Lawyer

Berthold Herbert Teusner CMG (16 May 1907 – 7 August 1992) was an Australian politician who represented the South Australian House of Assembly seat of Angas from 1944 to 1970 for the Liberal and Country League.

He served as Speaker of the South Australian House of Assembly from 1956 to 1962.

Parliament of South Australia
| Preceded by Robert Nicholls | Speaker of the South Australian House of Assembly; 1956–1962 | Succeeded by Tom Stott |
South Australian House of Assembly
| Preceded by Reginald Rudall | Member for Angas; 1944–1970 | Electorate abolished |
