= David Paton (politician) =

Australian politician from South Australia

David Paton MP

Member of the South Australian House of Assembly for Ngadjuri
- Incumbent
- Assumed office 21 March 2026
- Preceded by: Penny Pratt

Deputy Mayor of Adelaide Plains Council
- Incumbent
- Assumed office 28 October 2024
- Preceded by: Marcus Strudwicke

Councillor of the Adelaide Plains Council
- Incumbent
- Assumed office 12 November 2022

Personal details
- Born: David Rodney Paton c. 1970 Melbourne, Victoria, Australia
- Party: One Nation
- Children: 2

David Rodney Paton (/ˈpeɪtən/ PAY-tən) is an Australian politician who has served as the member for Ngadjuri in the South Australian House of Assembly since 21 March 2026. A member of One Nation, he won his seat in the 2026 state election. He has served as Deputy Mayor of the Adelaide Plains Council since 28 October 2024.

Paton is the first member of One Nation to be elected to the House of Assembly, and the first to be elected to any Australian state or territory lower house outside of Queensland.

== Political career ==
Paton was first elected to the Adelaide Plains Council in the 2022 South Australian local elections with 5.9% of the vote. He was appointed as Deputy Mayor in 2024 and reappointed in 2025. Paton described his time in local government as being focused on "reducing unnecessary expenditure" for ratepayers.

South Australian House of Assembly
Preceded by Penny Pratt	Member for Ngadjuri; 2026–present	Incumbent
