= Robert Dixson =

Australian politician

Robert Dixson (16 May 1843 – 27 November 1891) was a tobacco merchant and politician in the colony of South Australia. He was a brother of Sir Hugh Dixson, father of Sir Hugh Robert Denison and uncle of Sir William Dixson.

== History ==
Dixson was born in Sydney the younger son of Hugh Dixson (c. 1810 – 3 November 1880), and was educated at Sydney Grammar School and Sydney University. Hugh, who had been a tobacconist in Hanover Street, Edinburgh, founded a tobacco manufacturing business in Sydney in 1839, which in 1864 became Dixson & Sons with the addition of his sons Hugh Dixson, jr. (1841–1926) and Robert Dixson as partners.

In 1877 Robert was sent to South Australia to establish "The United States Tobacco Factory" in what was Clark's flour mill in Halifax Street.

He represented the electorate of Light in the South Australian House of Assembly from April 1881 to April 1884. His colleagues were Jenkin Coles and H. V. Moyle. He subsequently went on a trip to England and the United States, returning in 1885. In 1890 he undertook another trip to London, where he collapsed ("syncope") and died.

== Family ==
Hugh Dixson (5 June 1810 – 3 November 1880) married Helen Craig ( – ). Their family included:

- Sir Hugh Dixson (29 January 1841 – 11 May 1926) married Emma Elizabeth Shaw (1844 – 12 April 1922) on 3 July 1866

- Hugh Dixson (1868–1904)
- Sir William Dixson (18 April 1870 – 17 August 1952) major book, manuscript and art collector and benefactor.
- Emma Shaw Dixson (1872 – 19 November 1930)
- Helen Craig Dixson (1874–1961)
- Robert Craig Dixson (2 July 1881 – 1958)
- Thomas Storie Dixson (4 September 1886 – 8 December 1916) married Ruby Howard Turland ( – ) on 23 November 1910. Served with the Coldstream Guards, killed in France during World War I.

- Robert Dixson (16 May 1843 – 27 November 1891) married Ruth Whingates (1844 – 1924) at Parramatta on 2 February 1865. Their children included:

- Hugh Robert Dixson (11 November 1865 – 25 November 1940), changed his surname in 1907 to (later Sir) Hugh Robert Denison. He married Sara Rachel Fothergill (c. 1869 – 3 September 1949) on 26 April 1893

- Reginald Ernest Denison BA LLB (29 November 1894 – 1975) married Beatrice Marshall ( – ) on 16 May 1923
- Cecil Herbert Denison (9 January 1896 – )
- Leslie Arthur Denison (17 December 1897 – ) married Jean Windeyer Raine ( – ) on 7 May 1927

- Isabella Dixson (1845–1920) married Rev. Frederick Hibberd ( – 1908) on 11 January 1866
- Dr. Thomas Dixson M.B., C.M. (10 April 1854 – 9 December 1932) married his cousin Janet Maria Holdway "Janie" Storie ( – 1945) on 11 November 1887; Both adopted the surname Storie Dixson; they had three daughters.
