= Members of the South Australian Legislative Council, 1888–1891 =

This is a list of members of the South Australian Legislative Council from 1888 to 1891.

This was the second Legislative Council to be affected by the amendments to the Constitution, which provided for the Colony to be divided into four districts: (1) Central; (2) Southern; (3) North-Eastern and (4) Northern, with six members in each division; one third of each to be replaced in rotation every three years. (Previously, the whole colony acted as one electoral district "The Province" with one third replaced at General Elections every four years.)

Name	District	Term expires	Time in office	Notes
Arthur Richman Addison	Northern		1888–1915	
John Howard Angas	Central		1887–1894	
Henry Ayers	North-Eastern		1857–1888; 1888–1893	re-elected 1888
Richard Chaffey Baker	Southern		1877–1901	
John Bosworth	North-Eastern		1886–1894	
Henry Edward Bright	North-Eastern		1885–1891	
Allan Campbell	Northern		1878–1898	
William Copley	Northern		1887–1894	
George Witherage Cotton	Central		1882–1886; 1888–1892	
John Darling Sr.	Northern		1888–1897	
John Hannah Gordon	Southern		1888–1892; 1893-1903	
Alexander Hay	The Province		1882–1891	
Friedrich Krichauff	Southern		1890–1894	elected June 1890
Sylvanus James Magarey	Central		1888–1897	
James Martin	North-Eastern		1885–1894	
David Murray	The Province		1882–1891	
James O'Loghlin	Northern		1888–1902	
James Garden Ramsay	Southern		1880–1890	re-elected 1888 died 1890
Maurice Salom	The Province		1882-1891	
Henry Scott	Central		1878–1891	
William Knox Simms	Central		1884–1891	
Alfred Muller Simpson	Central		1887–1894	
Samuel Tomkinson	Southern		1885–1894; 1897–1900	
John Warren	North-Eastern / Midland		1888–1912	
William West-Erskine	Southern		1885–1891	
