= Malcolm Buckby =

Australian politician

The Honourable Malcolm Buckby

Minister for Education and Children's Services
- In office 20 October 1997 – 5 March 2002
- Premier: John Olsen; Rob Kerin
- Preceded by: Rob Lucas
- Succeeded by: Trish White

Member for Light
- In office 11 December 1993 – 18 March 2006
- Preceded by: Bruce Eastick
- Succeeded by: Tony Piccolo

Personal details
- Born: Malcolm Robert Buckby; 8 September 1951 (age 74)
- Party: Liberal

Malcolm Robert Buckby (born 8 September 1951) is an Australian former politician who lost his seat in the electoral district of Light in the 2006 SA election. He was first elected in 1993 replacing Bruce Eastick.

Buckby attended Prince Alfred College in Adelaide. He undertook Bachelor of Agricultural Science at the University of Adelaide. Later, he completed a Graduate Diploma of Economics and became a researcher working on a range of economic impact studies for the South Australian Centre for Economic Studies.

After the 2002 South Australian state election, Buckby was given the portfolios of Education, and transport, urban development, and planning portfolios in opposition. In April 2004, Buckby gave up his portfolios to concentrate on his electorate. Tony Piccolo won this seat in the 2006 SA election with 52.1% on two-party preference, a swing of 4.9%.

South Australian House of Assembly
Preceded by Bruce Eastick	Member for Light; 1993–2006	Succeeded by Tony Piccolo
