= James White (South Australian politician) =

Australian politician (c.1820–1890)

James "Nobby" White (c. 1820 – 20 August 1890) was a pastoralist, land agent and politician in the colony of South Australia.

== History ==
James White arrived in South Australia in 1845. His first occupation was as overseer at C. H. Bagot's head station "Koonunga". He headed for the diggings in 1851 during the Victorian gold rush, and returned a year later and purchased his first block of land at Bagot's Gap, the first of many pastoral properties in the Kapunda region and elsewhere in the colony, and became quite wealthy.

He was a partner in station agents and auctioneers, first with W. Brewer around 1859, then with Jenkin Coles as Coles and Goodchild, later Goodchild, Duff, & Co., which business was taken over by Elder, Smith & Co. in 1889.

He was elected MHA for the seat of Light after the resignation of Edward Hamilton, and served August 1871 to December 1871 and from February 1875 to April 1881, his associates being David Nock and Randolph Isham Stow. He stood for reelection in 1881 and 1884 and the 1888 Legislative Council election, but was unsuccessful on each occasion.

He was convicted under the Fraud at Auctions Act in 1876, and urged to resign his commission as Justice of the Peace but refused, on the grounds that would constitute admission of guilt. An appeal to the Supreme Court resulted in the controversial overturning of this verdict. Alexander Hay added to his woes by publicly refuting some of his courtroom statements. A year later he was re-appointed J.P.

He had a property, "Albert Vale", around two miles from Kapunda on the Eudunda road, which he sold in 1894 to David James, and became his celebrated property "Coalbrook Vale".

White was a taciturn man and never made many friends. He was buried at the Church of England cemetery, Kapunda.

== Family ==
James White married Rebecca Bridget Goodchild ( – 6 May 1888) and married again, to the widow Bessie Read on 3 November 1888; they lived at "Albavale", Kapunda. They had no children.

Abraham White (c. 1828 – 15 May 1885), brother of James, was a farmer and railway contractor of "Illawarra", Bagot's Well. He was married to Mary White née Wharton ( – c. 1931). They moved to nearby Kapunda then Western Australia, where most of their children had settled. Their children included:

- James Wharton White, (17 February 1857 – 30 January 1930) married Sophie Agnes Geyer. He was MHA for Light 1890–1896, moved to Esperance, Western Australia.
- Lilla Rebecca Wharton White (1858 – 15 January 1934) married engineer Edward H. V. Keane (August 1844 – 9 July 1904) on 27 May 1879. He was a noted WA politician.
- Frances Ellen Wharton White ( – 17 September 1944) died at Albany, Western Australia.
- William St. Clare Wharton White (c. 1862 – 29 December 1946) married Penelope Annie Buchanan (c. 1862 – 2 March 1935) on 29 April 1886, moved to Cottesloe, Western Australia. Penelope was a daughter of Alexander Buchanan, overseer of Anlaby Station.
- Edward Wharton White (c. 1864 – 10 January 1949) married Alice Kate Buchanan ( – 21 December 1941) on 10 December 1887, moved to Albany, Western Australia. Alice was another daughter of Alexander Buchanan, of Anlaby Station.
- Blanche Elizabeth Isabel Wharton White ( – 3 November 1931) moved to Subiaco, Western Australia.

John White (c. 1855 – 1 February 1929) of "Thadmore", Bagot's Gap married Mary Slattery (c. 1827 – 13 December 1887), and had a large family. John was a son of one Patrick White, and may be unrelated.
