= Speaker of the South Australian House of Assembly =

Speaker of the House of Assembly Parliament of South Australia
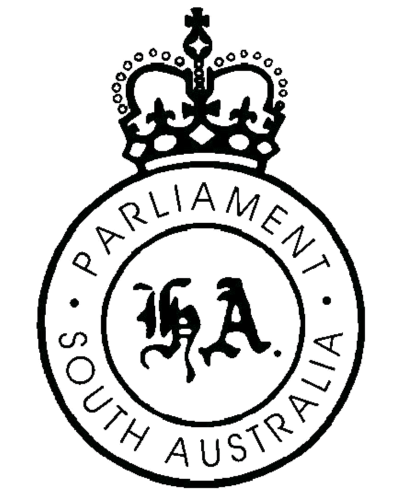
- Crest of the House of Assembly

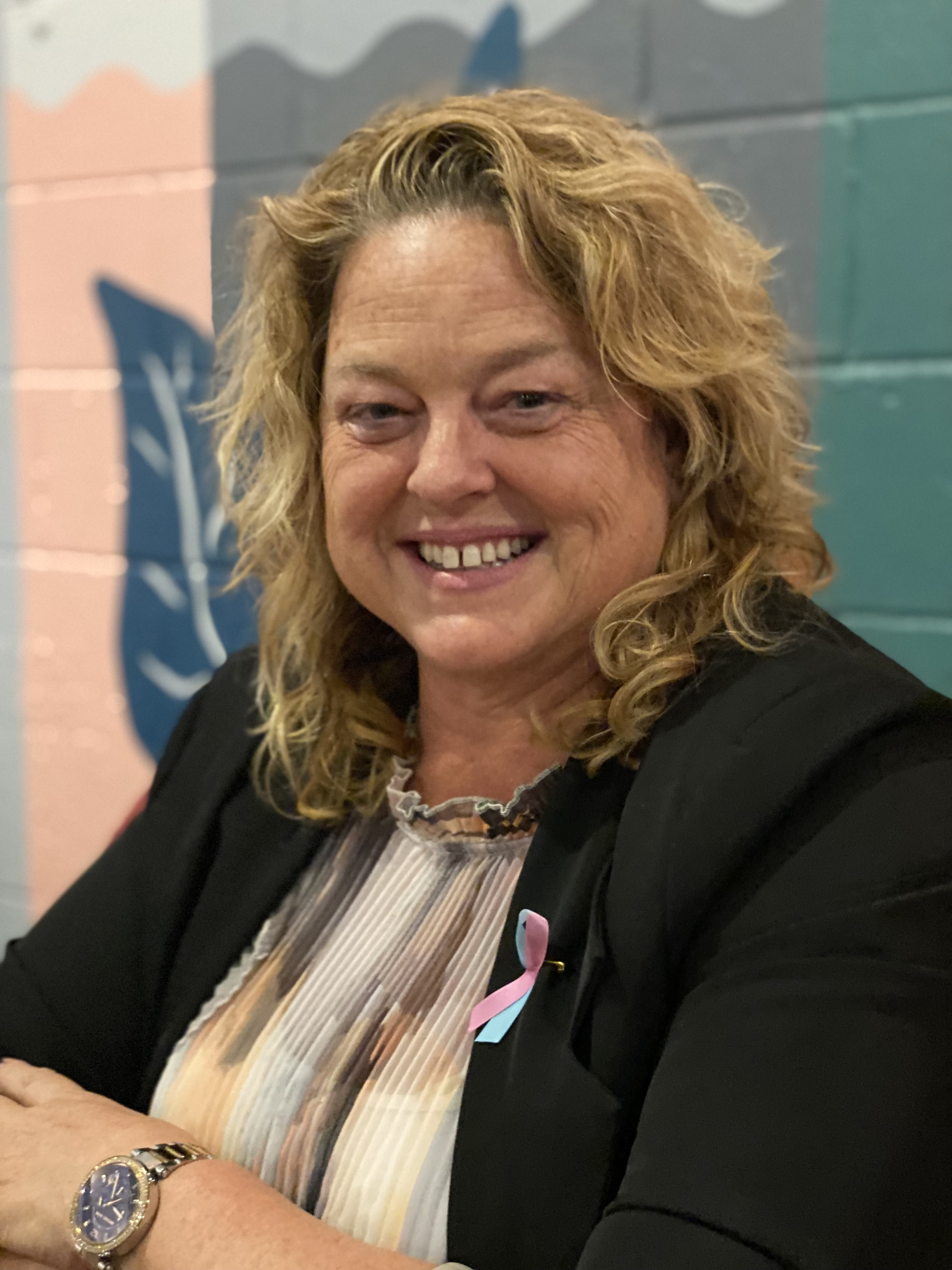
- Incumbent; Nat Cook since 5 May 2026
- Style: Madam/Mr Speaker (informal and within the house); The Honourable (within the Commonwealth)
- Status: Presiding and chief administrative officer
- Member of: House of Assembly; Joint Parliamentary Services Committee
- Appointer: Elected by the House of Assembly
- Term length: At His Majesty's pleasure with the confidence of the House or until resignation
- Constituting instrument: Constitution Act 1934 (Sections 34-36)
- Formation: 22 April 1857
- First holder: George Strickland Kingston
- Deputy: Chairman of Committees
- Salary: $326,550 (including $186,600 salary + 75%)
- Website: Official website

The Speaker of the South Australian House of Assembly is the presiding officer of the South Australian House of Assembly, the lower house of the Parliament of South Australia. The other presiding officer is the President of the South Australian Legislative Council.

The current Speaker is Labor/Independent MP Nat Cook, who was elected speaker unopposed, following the 2026 South Australian state election, and the retirement of former speaker, Leon Bignell. (Note: The South Australian Constitution Act requires the Speaker to be Independent - See Independent speaker section.)

== History and role ==
=== Establishment of the Speaker ===
The office of Speaker of the House of Assembly was established by the province's 1856 Constitution, and was based on the similar role of the British Parliament's Speaker of the House of Commons. In 1934, the state enacted a new constitution, keeping the same legislative provisions for the speaker as had been provided for in the 1856 version.

Following the 1857 South Australian election, George Strickland Kingston became the first speaker elected to the position, with the longest serving Speaker being Robert Nicholls who was Speaker for 22 years and 240 days from 1933 to 1956.

=== Duties and role ===
These constitutions provided for the Speaker of the House of Assembly to be elected by all the Members of the Assembly, with the role to be the chairperson of the Assembly.

In 1885, Clerk of the House of Assembly, Edwin Blackmore published the Manual of the Practice, Procedure, and Usage of the House of Assembly of the Province of South Australia, which outlined the specific duties of the Speaker, which include:

- presiding over the deliberations of the House, and maintaining order,
- counting the House before the business is commenced, and at any time when attention is called to the state of the House,
- calling upon Members to speak, to put the questions and move the motions standing in their names, and bringing up Bills,
- putting questions for the decision of the House, and declaring the result by voices or by divisions,
- giving a casting vote where necessary,
- receiving Reports from the Committee of the whole House.
- receiving and communicating to the House Messages from the Governor, and from the Legislative Council,
- announcing vacancies and the issue of Writs,
- reporting Assent to Bills,
- adjourning the House, whether on motion or from want of a Quorum.

The Speaker's deputy is the Deputy Speaker and Chairman of Committees, a role which was first established in 1875, with the functions of Chairman of Committees originally being undertaken by the Speaker.

== Independent speaker ==
In October 2021, former Deputy Speaker, Frances Bedford introduced a Bill into parliament seeking to amend Section 34 of the state’s constitution to ensure the Speaker was “free of any political influence, perceived or otherwise.” The amendments sought to constitutionally ban the Speaker from being a member of a registered political party, with a specific caveat that the ban only be in effect outside of a "relevant election period", effectively meaning for the first three years of a new parliament, the Speaker would be banned from being a member of a political party, but in the final three months before an election, could join or rejoin a political party.

The Bill passed both Houses of Parliament in late October 2021, and the Constitution (Independent Speaker) Amendment Act 2021 (SA) received Royal assent by the Governor in November, and came into effect on the same day.

Following the 2022 South Australian state election, Labor Party member, Leon Bignell was elected as Speaker and was forced to resign from the Party immediately; however, after the barring period ended, Bignell rejoined the Party. Following the 2026 South Australian state election, Nat Cook was elected Speaker, and resigned from the Labor Party.

== List of speakers ==
Since the first parliament in 1857, there have been 39 speakers of the House of Assembly.

Order	Member	Party	Term commence	Term end	Term in office
1	George Strickland Kingston		22 April 1857	22 March 1860	2 years, 335 days
2	George Charles Hawker		27 April 1860	28 February 1865	4 years, 307 days
3	George Strickland Kingston		31 March 1865	26 November 1880 Died in office	15 years, 240 days
4	Robert Dalrymple Ross		2 June 1881	27 December 1887 Died in office	6 years, 208 days
5	John Cox Bray		31 May 1888	5 June 1890	2 years, 5 days
6	Jenkin Coles	Liberal Union / National Defence League	5 June 1890	17 November 1911	21 years, 165 days
7	Harry Jackson	United Labor Party	17 November 1911	18 March 1912	122 days
8	Laurence O'Loughlin	Liberal Union	19 March 1912	7 July 1915	3 years, 110 days
9	Frederick Coneybeer	United Labor Party; National Party	8 July 1915	9 April 1921	5 years, 275 days
10	Richard Butler	Liberal Union/ Liberal Federation	21 July 1921	5 April 1924	2 years, 259 days
11	John McInnes	Labor Party	24 July 1924	27 August 1926	2 years, 34 days
12	Frederick Birrell	Labor Party	31 August 1926	16 May 1927	258 days
13	George Laffer	Liberal Federation	17 May 1927	26 May 1930	3 years, 9 days
14	Eric Shepherd	Labor Party/ Parliamentary Labor Party	27 May 1930	7 April 1933	2 years, 315 days
15	Robert Nicholls	Liberal and Country League	6 July 1933	2 March 1956	22 years, 240 days
16	Berthold Teusner	Liberal and Country League	9 May 1956	11 April 1962	5 years, 337 days
17	Tom Stott	Independent	12 April 1962	13 May 1965	3 years, 31 days
18	Lindsay Riches	Labor Party	13 May 1965	15 April 1968	2 years, 338 days
19	Tom Stott	Independent	16 April 1968	29 May 1970	2 years, 43 days
20	Reg Hurst	Labor Party	14 July 1970	31 March 1973	2 years, 260 days
21	John Ryan	Labor Party	19 June 1973	11 July 1975	2 years, 22 days
22	Ted Connelly	Independent	5 August 1975	16 September 1977	2 years, 42 days
23	Gil Langley	Labor Party	6 October 1977	11 October 1979	2 years, 5 days
24	Bruce Eastick	Liberal Party	11 October 1979	7 December 1982	3 years, 57 days
25	Terry McRae	Labor Party	8 December 1982	11 February 1986	3 years, 93 days
26	John Trainer	Labor Party	11 February 1986	8 February 1990	3 years, 362 days
27	Norm Peterson	Independent Labor	8 February 1990	10 December 1993	3 years, 305 days
28	Graham Gunn	Liberal Party	11 February 1994	2 December 1997	3 years, 294 days
29	John Oswald	Liberal Party	2 December 1997	8 February 2002	4 years, 68 days
30	Peter Lewis	Independent	5 March 2002	4 April 2005	3 years, 30 days
31	Bob Such	Independent	4 April 2005	26 March 2006	356 days
32	Jack Snelling	Labor Party	27 April 2006	25 March 2010	3 years, 332 days
33	Lyn Breuer	Labor Party	6 May 2010	5 February 2013	2 years, 275 days
34	Michael Atkinson	Labor Party	5 February 2013	16 March 2018	5 years, 39 days
35	Vincent Tarzia	Liberal Party	3 May 2018	29 July 2020	2 years, 87 days
36	Josh Teague	Liberal Party	8 September 2020	12 October 2021	1 year, 34 days
37	Dan Cregan	Independent	12 October 2021	11 April 2024	2 years, 182 days
38	Leon Bignell	Labor/Independent (Note: The Constitution required that Bignell to resign from the Labor Party in 2022 on his election as Speaker; he rejoined in 2025 following the end of the barring period.)	11 April 2024	21 March 2026	1 year, 343 days
39	Nat Cook	Labor/Independent (Note: The Constitution required that Cook to resign from the Labor Party in 2026 on her election as Speaker; she can rejoin the Party in 2029, or if her tenure as Speaker ends before the 2029 barring period ends.)	5 May 2026	Present	126 days

== See also ==
- Deputy Speaker of the South Australian House of Assembly
- President of the South Australian Legislative Council
