= Bruce Eastick =

Australian politician (1927–2025)

The Honourable Bruce Eastick AM
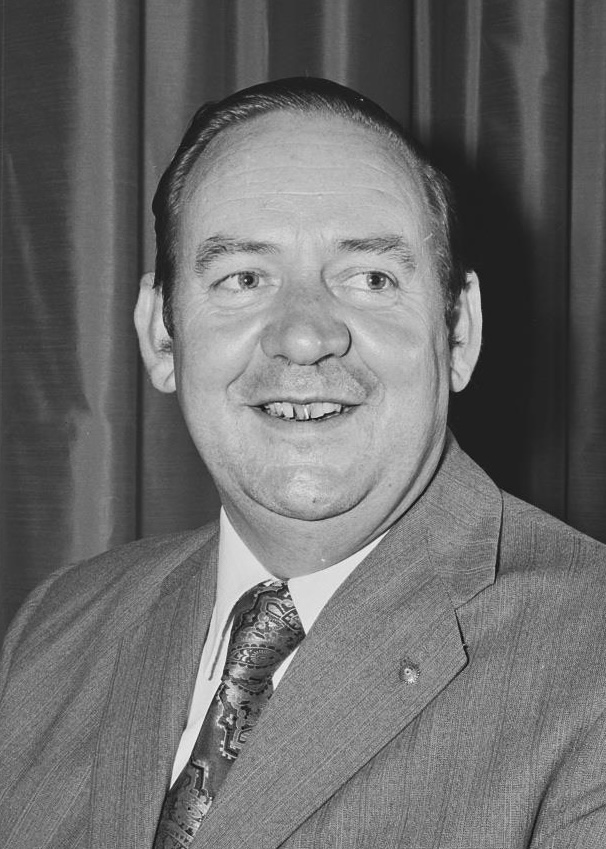
- Eastick in 1973

Leader of the Opposition in South Australia
- In office 15 March 1972 – 24 July 1975
- Deputy: Robin Millhouse; John Coumbe
- Preceded by: Steele Hall
- Succeeded by: David Tonkin

Speaker of the South Australian House of Assembly
- In office 11 October 1979 – 7 December 1982
- Preceded by: Gil Langley
- Succeeded by: Terry McRae

Leader of the South Australian Liberal Party (Note: Known as the Liberal and Country League until 22 July 1974)
- In office 15 March 1972 – 24 July 1975
- Preceded by: Steele Hall
- Succeeded by: David Tonkin

Member for Light
- In office 30 May 1970 – 11 December 1993
- Preceded by: John Freebairn
- Succeeded by: Malcolm Buckby

Mayor of Gawler
- In office 6 July 1968 – 1 July 1972
- In office 1 May 1993 – 6 May 2000
- Succeeded by: Tony Piccolo

Alderman of the Gawler Council
- In office 6 July 1963 – 1 July 1972
- In office 1 May 1993 – 6 May 2000

Personal details
- Born: Bruce Charles Eastick; 25 October 1927 Reade Park, South Australia, Australia
- Died: 5 December 2025 (aged 98)
- Party: Liberal and Country League, Liberal Party of Australia (SA)
- Parent(s): Tom Eastick, Ruby Eastick (née Bruce)

Bruce Charles Eastick (25 October 1927 – 5 December 2025) was an Australian politician who was the South Australian Leader of the Opposition from 1972 to 1975. He was a member of the Liberal and Country League (LCL), later renamed the South Australian Division of the Liberal Party of Australia in 1974. He represented the South Australian House of Assembly seat of Light from 1970 to 1993.

== Gawler Council ==
Eastick was a member of the Gawler Council from 1963 to 1972, and was mayor from 1968 to 1972. He had a second stint as mayor from 1993 to 2000.

== Parliament ==
Eastick was elected to the House of Assembly for Light, based on Gawler, in 1970. Two years later, after Steele Hall resigned as LCL leader, the party elected Eastick as his successor.

Eastick led his party to the 1973 and 1975 elections, losing both to the Don Dunstan-led South Australian branch of the Australian Labor Party. His term as leader saw the LCL, the state's main conservative party since 1932, formally rename itself as the South Australian Division of the Liberal Party of Australia, although a separate state Country Party had been re-formed in 1963. He was thus the only LCL leader to have never served as Premier of South Australia.

Eastick was Speaker of the South Australian House of Assembly when his successor as South Australia Liberal leader, David Tonkin, was premier from 1979 to 1982.

== Death ==
Eastick died on 5 December 2025 at the age of 98.

== Honours ==
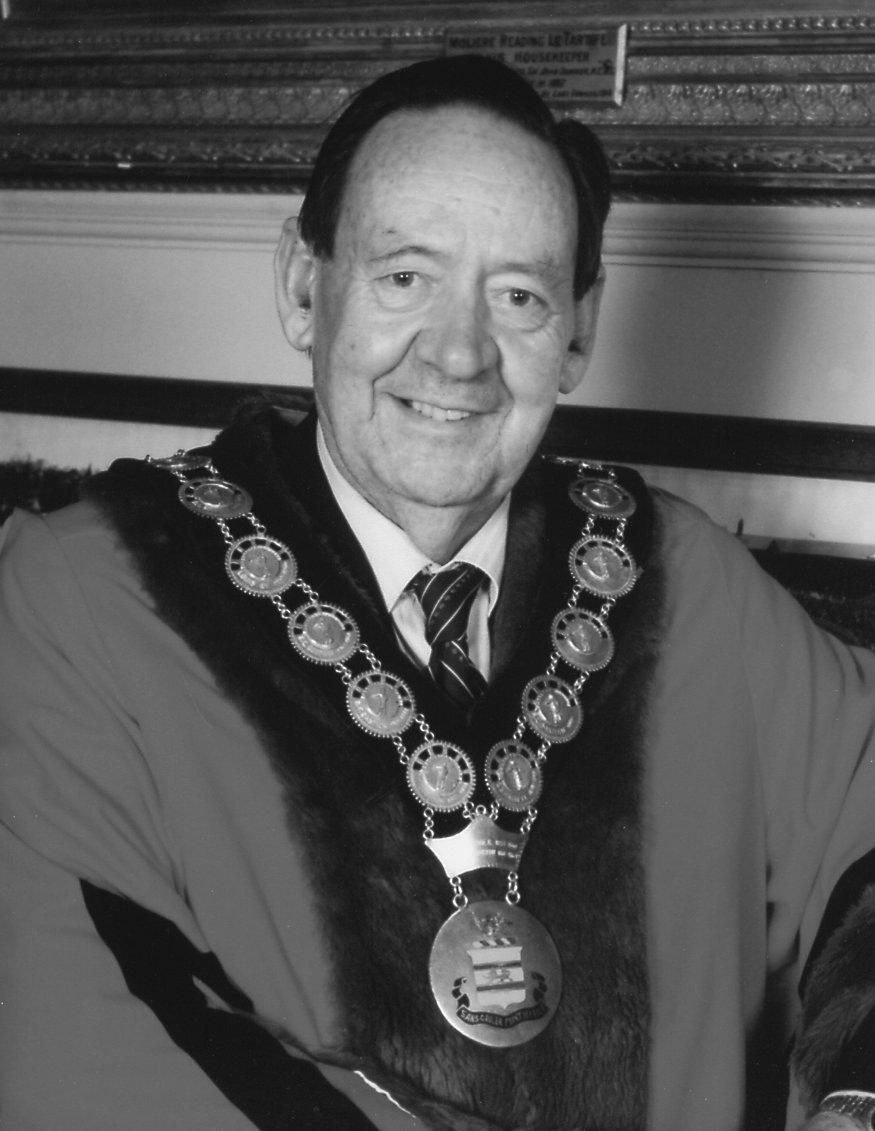
Eastick as Mayor of Gawler in 1999

In 1996, Eastick was made a Member of the Order of Australia (AM) in recognition of his "service to the South Australian Parliament, local government and the community".

Eastick was the eldest son of Sir Tom Eastick.

Political offices
Preceded by Steele Hall	Leader of the Opposition of South Australia; 1972–1975	Succeeded by David Tonkin
Parliament of South Australia
Preceded by John Freebairn	Member for Light; 1970–1993	Succeeded by Malcolm Buckby
Preceded by Gil Langley	Speaker of the South Australian House of Assembly; 1979–1982	Succeeded by Terry McRae
Party political offices
Preceded by Steele Hall	Leader of the Liberal and Country League (SA); Leader of the Liberal Party of Australia (South Australian Division); 1972–1975	Succeeded by David Tonkin
