= Friedrich Wilhelm Paech =

Australian politician

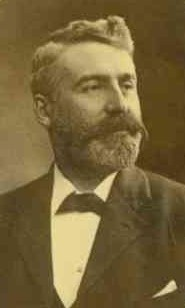

Friedrich Wilhelm Paech (3 October 1861 – 29 December 1908) was an Australian politician who represented the South Australian House of Assembly multi-member seats of Light from 1899 to 1902 and Wooroora from 1902 to 1908, joining the Australasian National League in 1902.
