= Robert Nicholls (politician) =

Australian politician

The Honourable Sir Robert Nicholls
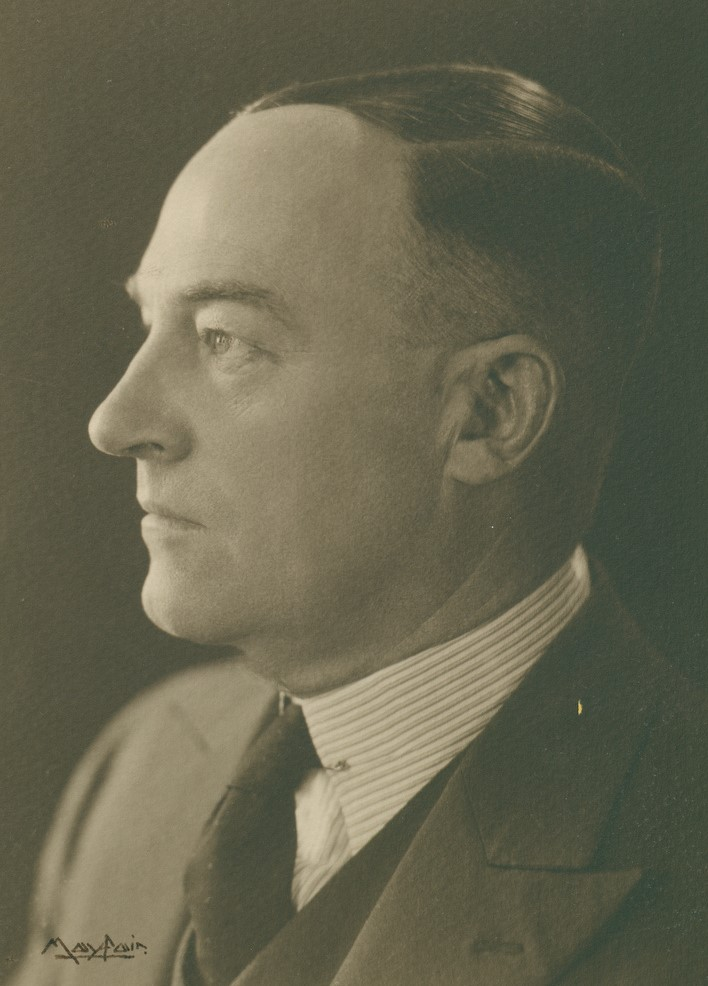
- Nicholls in 1936

Member of the South Australian House of Assembly for Stanley
- In office 27 March 1915 – 19 March 1938 Serving with: Henry Barwell 1915–1925; John Lyons 1925–1938

Member of the South Australian House of Assembly for Young
- In office 19 March 1938 – 2 March 1956

Speaker of the South Australian House of Assembly
- In office 6 July 1933 – 2 March 1956
- Preceded by: Eric Shepherd
- Succeeded by: Berthold Teusner

Personal details
- Born: Robert Dove Nicholls; 27 June 1889
- Died: 18 January 1970 (aged 80)
- Party: Liberal Union 1915–1923; Liberal Federation 1923–1932; Liberal and Country League 1932–1938
- Spouse: Rose Evelyn Marshall Cowan (m. 1915; died 1963)
- Children: 4
- Parents: James Nicholls (father); Florence Bailey Dove (mother)

Sir Robert Dove Nicholls (27 June 1889 – 18 January 1970) was an Australian politician who represented the South Australian House of Assembly seats of Stanley from 1915 to 1938 and Young from 1938 to 1956 for the Liberal and Country League and party predecessors. He was one of the two members for Stanley for the entire time it was a two-member seat, and the member for Young for its entire existence. He served a record period as Speaker of the South Australian House of Assembly from 1933 to 1956.

He retired at the 1956 election, after his seat was abolished in a redistribution and he failed to gain preselection for a different seat.

Nicholls was created a knight bachelor in the 1941 New Year Honours for his service as speaker of the assembly.

== Personal life ==
Nicholls' parents were James and Florence (née Dove) Nicholls of Nantawarra. He had four children. He was a prolific lay preacher in the Methodist Church.

== See also ==
- Hundred of Nicholls

Parliament of South Australia
Preceded by Eric Shepherd	Speaker of the South Australian House of Assembly; 1933–1956	Succeeded by Berthold Teusner
