= Penny Pratt =

Australian politician

Member of the South Australian House of Assembly for Frome
- In office 19 March 2022 – 21 March 2026
- Preceded by: Geoff Brock
- Succeeded by: David Paton

Personal details
- Born: 3 December 1975 (age 50)
- Party: Liberal Party of Australia
- Parent: Mike Pratt (father)
- Website: https://saliberal.org.au/team/penny-pratt

Penelope Kate Pratt (born 3 December 1975) is an Australian former politician. She was a Liberal member of the South Australian House of Assembly from the 2022 state election for four years, representing Frome. She was defeated at the 2026 state election by One Nation candidate David Paton.

Pratt had previously contested two state elections. She stood for the seat of Ashford in 2010 and against the then Premier, Jay Weatherill in 2018 in the seat of Cheltenham. Prior to the 2022 election, Frome had been held since 2009 by Independent politician Geoff Brock, who stood for the seat of Stuart, following redistribution.

Pratt's father Michael was the federal member for Adelaide after winning the 1988 Adelaide by-election until he was defeated at the 1990 federal election. Her cousin, Tom Michael, ran as the Liberal candidate for the seat of Narungga in the 2022 election.

During her election campaign, Pratt emphasised her local credentials, having grown up on a farm near Blyth. She worked as a Liberal staffer for Steven Marshall before he became premier, then as chief of staff for Minister for Child Protection, Rachel Sanderson. She took leave from that position in December 2021, having recently moved to the Clare Valley within the electorate.

Pratt had advocated for Frome to be renamed in honour of former Liberal premier Steele Hall, but it was instead renamed Ngadjuri from 2026 (meaning "we people") referring to the Ngadjuri people, whose traditional lands cover SA's mid-north region.

South Australian House of Assembly
Preceded by Geoff Brock	Member for Frome; 2022–2026	Succeeded by David Paton
