= Frank Skeffington Carroll =

Australian politician

Frank Skeffington Carroll (c. 1837–1887) was a salesman, mapmaker, journalist, editor, and, briefly, a politician in the colony of South Australia.

Carroll was born in Ireland, the second son of Bernard Carroll of Dublin.

He emigrated to Australia, perhaps around 1870, and had a chequered career in Victoria and New South Wales.

Around 1875, as "Frank O'Reilly" he was a popular society figure in Tasmania, and left that colony owing money to investors in Hiscock & Co.'s "Map of Tasmania", in which he had a stake, and which was never published.

In 1876 he was a candidate for the South Australian House of Assembly seat of Sturt. He took over as proprietor and editor of The Lantern, a satirical weekly, with Alfred Clint, scenic artist of the Theatre Royal, his cartoonist. He published an atlas of South Australia late in this same year (see Bibliography below).

He was elected to one of three seats for the district of Light in the House of Assembly in April 1878, despite public accusations that he had spent time in Pentridge prison, which he strenuously denied. It turned out the accusations were "straw men" set up by himself or a friend: he had not used the alias "O'Sullivan" in New Zealand, and had not been sent to Pentridge, but he had called himself "O'Reilly" in Tasmania, and had been sent to Melbourne Gaol. After the Register revealed that Carroll had been sentenced to two years' in Darlinghurst Gaol for uttering a valueless cheque, citing the Sydney Morning Herald of 22 August 1871, Carroll was forced to resign his seat in May 1878.

He was tried by Judge Boucaut and jury for malicious libel in The Lantern of 23 August 1879 against James Hurst and the Mutual Trade Protection Association. Carroll defended himself without distinction, was found guilty and sentenced to six months' jail and a fine of £500.

Duncan Moodie, editor of The Portonian, another Adelaide satirical paper, described Carroll as having "a hide like a rhinoceros" and producing "an effete and harmless paper". Carroll made various attempts to improve The Lantern: in 1881 he and partner John Roche enlarged it to tabloid format, included serious articles by F. H. Linklater and Henry Cargill, and dropped the cartoons. Roche died at the end of 1881 and publication lapsed for six months before reappearing in its old format. In July 1882 Carroll was charged with republishing an article from Pasquin without permission.

Carroll sold the paper to Charles F. Stansbury, who with Charles A. Murphy in 1884 took over and absorbed Adelaide Punch. In 1890 The Lantern was taken over by Quiz.

He died in Melbourne.

== Family ==
He married Emma Hogarth, née Homburg, (c. 1844 – ) of Adelaide on 28 April 1877.

== Bibliography ==
- Carroll, F. S. The New counties, hundreds and district atlas of South Australia and Northern Territory : together with map of South Australia, indicating roads, distances, relative position of counties, etc., etc. Published E. S. Wigg 1876.

Available as facsimile and microfiche editions:

- Carroll, F. S; Giles, A. J; Lewis, James William (1876), The new counties, hundreds, and district atlas of South Australia and Northern Territory together with map of South Australia, indicating roads, distances, relative position of counties, &c., &c, Frearson, ISBN 978-1-921315-07-7
- Carroll, F. S.; South Australian Genealogy and Heraldry Society (1986), The New counties, hundreds and district atlas of South Australia and Northern Territory together with map of South Australia, indicating roads, distances, relative position of counties, etc., etc, South Australian Genealogy and Heraldry Society
