= Tony Piccolo =

Australian politician

The Honourable Tony Piccolo
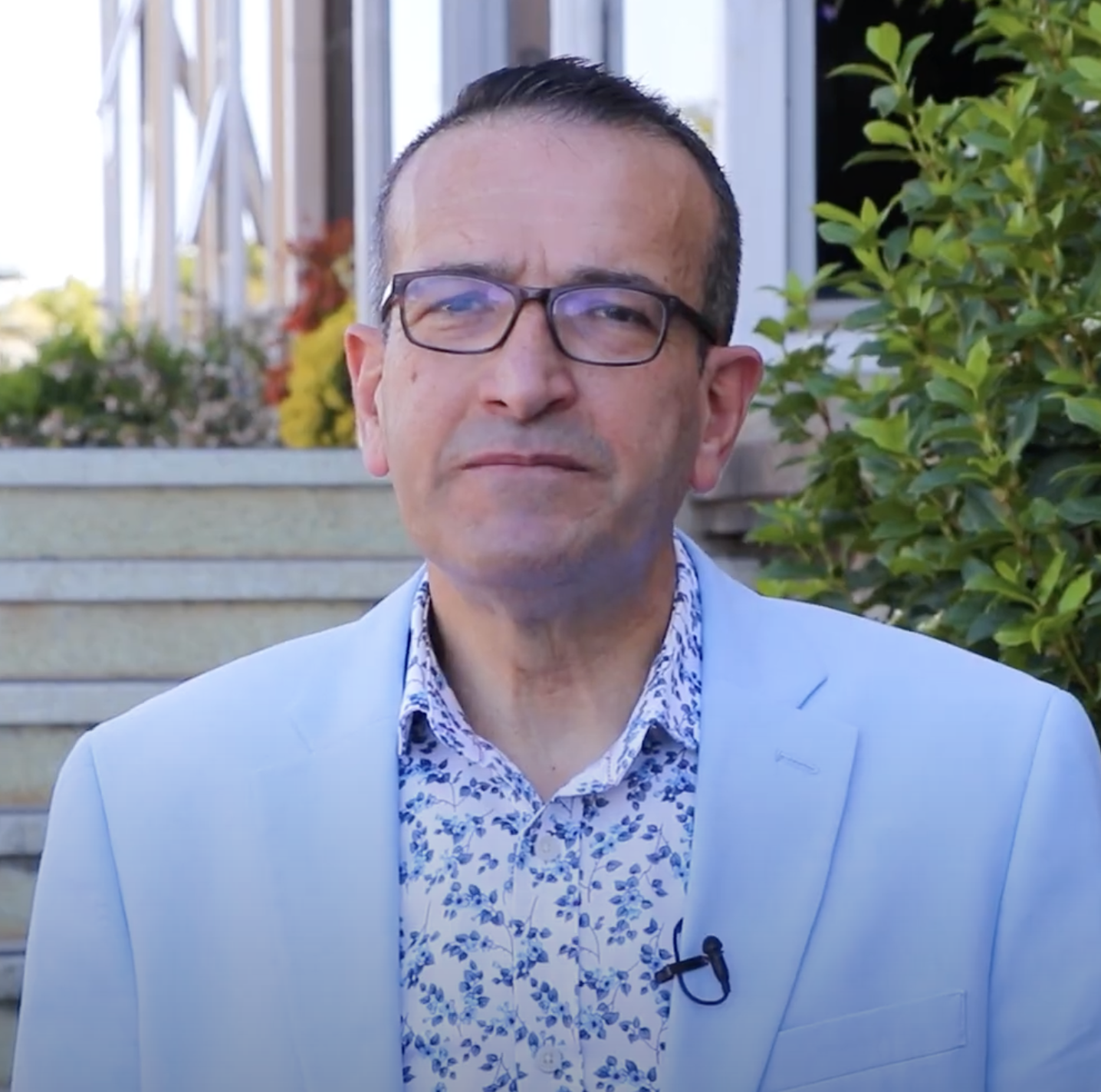

Deputy Speaker Chairman of Committees
- In office 3 May 2022 – 2026
- Preceded by: Peter Treloar
- In office 8 November 2011 – 21 January 2013
- Preceded by: Chloë Fox
- Succeeded by: Frances Bedford

Minister for Disabilities
- In office 21 January 2013 – 19 January 2016
- Preceded by: Ian Hunter
- Succeeded by: Leesa Vlahos
Other Roles (2013–2016)
Minister for Correctional Services Minister for Emergency Services Minister for Police Minister for Road Safety
In office 26 March 2014 – 19 January 2016
Preceded by	Michael O'Brien
Succeeded by	Peter Malinauskas
Minister for Volunteers Minister for Youth Minister for Social Housing Minister for Social Inclusion
In office 21 January 2013 – 26 March 2014
Preceded by	Ian Hunter
Succeeded by	Zoe Bettison

Member of the South Australian House of Assembly for Light
- In office 18 March 2006 – 20 March 2026
- Preceded by: Malcolm Buckby
- Succeeded by: James Agness

Mayor of Gawler
- In office 6 May 2000 – March 2006
- Preceded by: Bruce Eastick
- Succeeded by: Helena Dawkins

Councillor for the Town of Gawler
- In office 4 May 1985 – March 2006

Councillor on the District Council of Munno Para
- In office 3 October 1981 – 7 October 1985

Personal details
- Born: Antonio Piccolo; 22 February 1960 (age 66) Naples, Italy
- Party: Labor Party
- Children: 3
- Education: University of Adelaide (BEc); Flinders University (MEdM)
- Profession: Business manager
- Website: www.tonypiccolo.org

Antonio "Tony" Piccolo (born 22 February 1960) is a former Australian Labor politician who represented Light in the South Australian House of Assembly from 2006 until his defeat at the 2026 election. He served as the Deputy Speaker of the House of Assembly from 2011 to 2013 and again from 2022 to 2026.

== Early life ==
Piccolo was born in Naples, Italy, and emigrated to Australia in 1963 with his parents. He was educated at Evanston Primary School, Gawler High School and the University of Adelaide, from which he graduated with a Bachelor of Economics.

He was elected to the District Council of Munno Para in 1981, then became a councillor for the Town of Gawler from 1985 to 2006, serving as deputy mayor with a few short breaks from 1989 to 2000 and as mayor from 2000 to 2006.

== Parliament ==
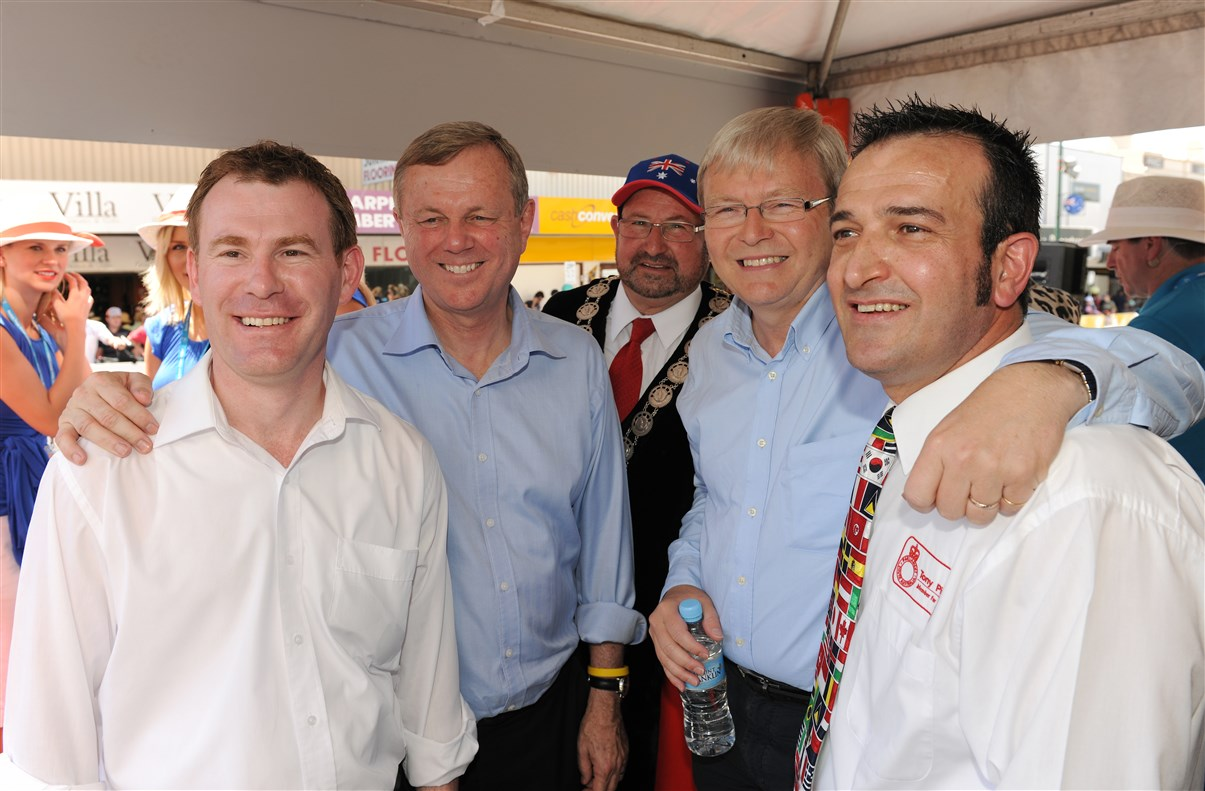
Federal MHR Nick Champion, SA Premier Mike Rann, Gawler Mayor Brian Sambell, Prime Minister Kevin Rudd and Piccolo in Gawler for the Tour Down Under in 2010.

Piccolo won Light at the 2006 election with a 52.1 percent two-party-preferred vote from a swing of 4.9 points against the incumbent Liberal member, Malcolm Buckby. He was only the second Labor member ever to win this traditionally conservative seat, and the first in 62 years. The only other Labor MP ever to win it was Sydney McHugh, who held it from 1941 to 1944 and had earlier held the federal seat of Wakefield.

This was actually Piccolo's third attempt to win the seat. He'd previously run in 1985 and 1989, losing heavily both times to Liberal incumbent and former state opposition leader Bruce Eastick. By 2006, however, the seat had been pushed further into Labor-friendly territory in Adelaide's outer northern suburbs, turning it from an entirely rural seat into a hybrid urban-rural seat.

Piccolo increased his vote to 55.3 percent at the 2010 election and became the first Labor MP to be re-elected to Light. Piccolo's victory ran counter not only to the statewide trend, but decades of voting patterns in the seat. On paper, Light was Labor's most marginal seat, and would have been one of the first to be lost to the Liberals in the event of a uniform swing large enough to bring about a change of government. Piccolo's victory was critical to allowing Labor to retain a bare majority of two seats even as it lost the two-party vote.

Light was redistributed significantly ahead of the 2014 election, but Piccolo retained the seat, again against the statewide trend with an unchanged two-party vote of 52.8 percent. In 2018, Piccolo took 59.9 percent of the two-party vote, just on the edge of making Light a safe Labor seat. This came even as Labor lost government, marking only the second time that the Liberals or their predecessors, the Liberal and Country League, had been in government without holding Light.

Piccolo's factional alignment within the Labor party changed during his time in office. In 2010, Piccolo was aligned with the Labor Left faction. At the time of his appointment to the ministry in 2013, he had switched from the Left faction to the Right following a "factional deal". At the time of his resignation from cabinet he remained aligned with the Right.

== Minister ==
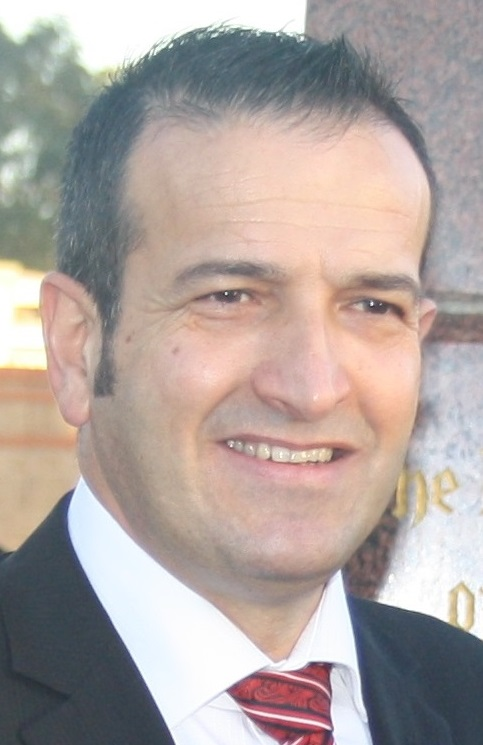
Piccolo in 2013

From 2013 to 2016, he served in nine various ministerial portfolios at different times in the Weatherill Labor cabinet – Disabilities, Youth, Volunteers, Communities and Social Inclusion, Social Housing, Police, Correctional Services, Emergency Services, and Road Safety. He announced his resignation from cabinet on 12 January 2016, citing cabinet renewal, and confirmed he intended to re-contest his seat at the 2018 election.

South Australian House of Assembly
Preceded by Malcolm Buckby	Member for Light; 2006–2026	Succeeded by James Agness
