= James Shannon (Australian politician) =

Australian politician

James Shannon (c. 1840 – 15 November 1891) served one term as a member of the South Australian House of Assembly for the Electoral district of Light from 16 April 1878 to 24 April 1881.

== Family ==
He was a half-brother of David Shannon MHA (28 March 1822 – 9 September 1875). See his article for other members of this notable family.
