= Sihui (disambiguation) =

Sihui (四会市) is a county-level city in Guangdong, China.

Sihui may also refer to:

- Sihui, Beijing (四惠), a transportation node in Beijing
  - Sihui station
  - Sihui East station

== See also ==
- Siwei Subdistrict
