= Shuangqiao station (Beijing Subway) =

Beijing Subway station

Shuang Qiao 双桥
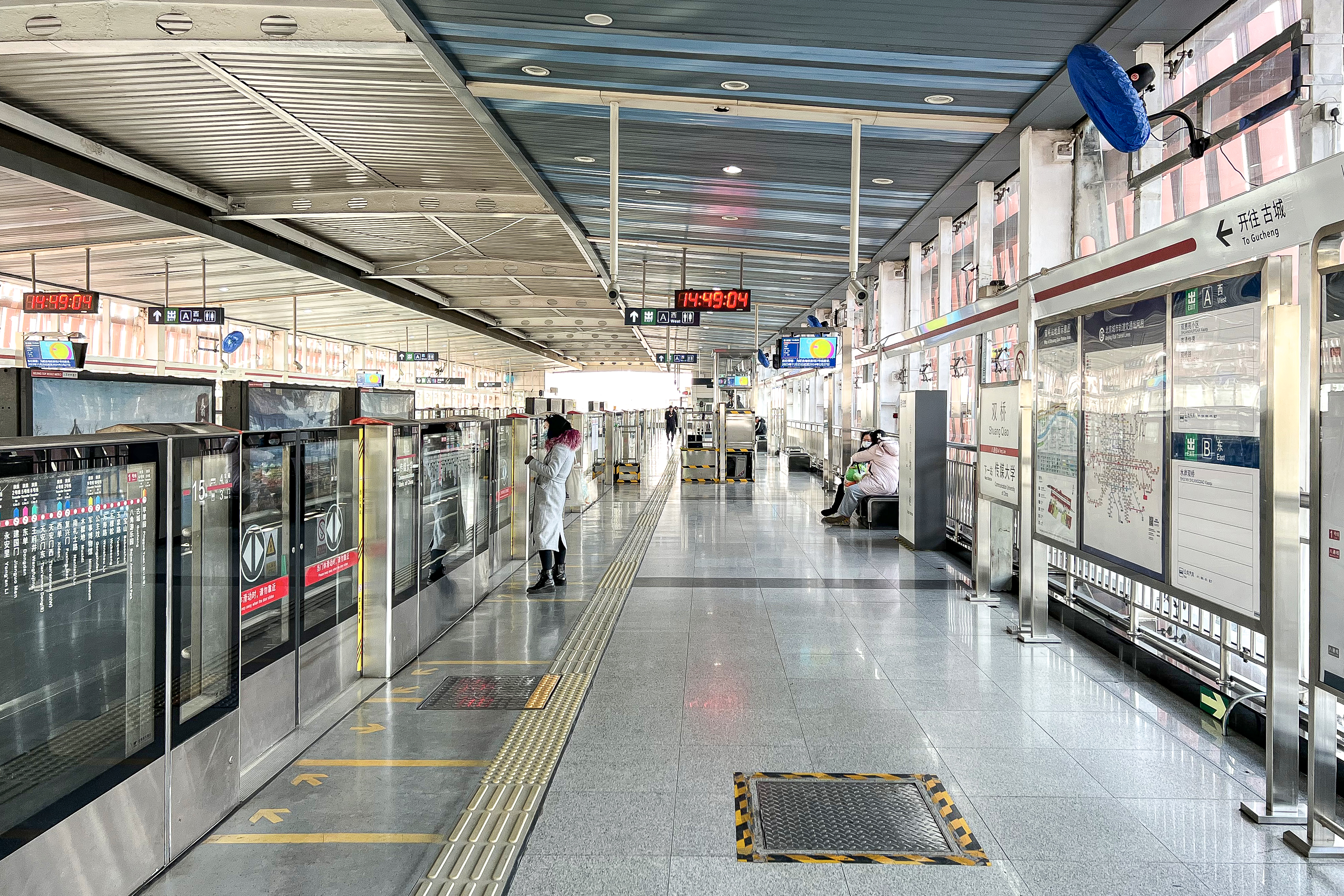
- Westbound platform

General information
- Location: Sanjianfang, Chaoyang District, Beijing; China
- Coordinates: 39.910139°N 116.576709°E
- Operator: Beijing Mass Transit Railway Operation Corporation Limited
- Line: Batong line
- Platforms: 2 (2 side platforms)
- Tracks: 2

Construction
- Structure type: Elevated
- Accessible: Yes

Other information
- Station code: BT05

History
- Opened: December 27, 2003; 22 years ago

Services
Preceding station	Beijing Subway	Following station
Communication University of China towards Gucheng	Batong line	Guaanzhuang towards Universal Resort
Location
- Location within Beijing

Shuang Qiao Station (simplified Chinese: 双桥站; traditional Chinese: 雙橋站; pinyin: Shuāng Qiáo Zhàn) is a station on the Batong line of the Beijing Subway, and is located in the Sanjianfang area (三间房地区) in Chaoyang District.

== Station layout ==
The station has 2 elevated side platforms.

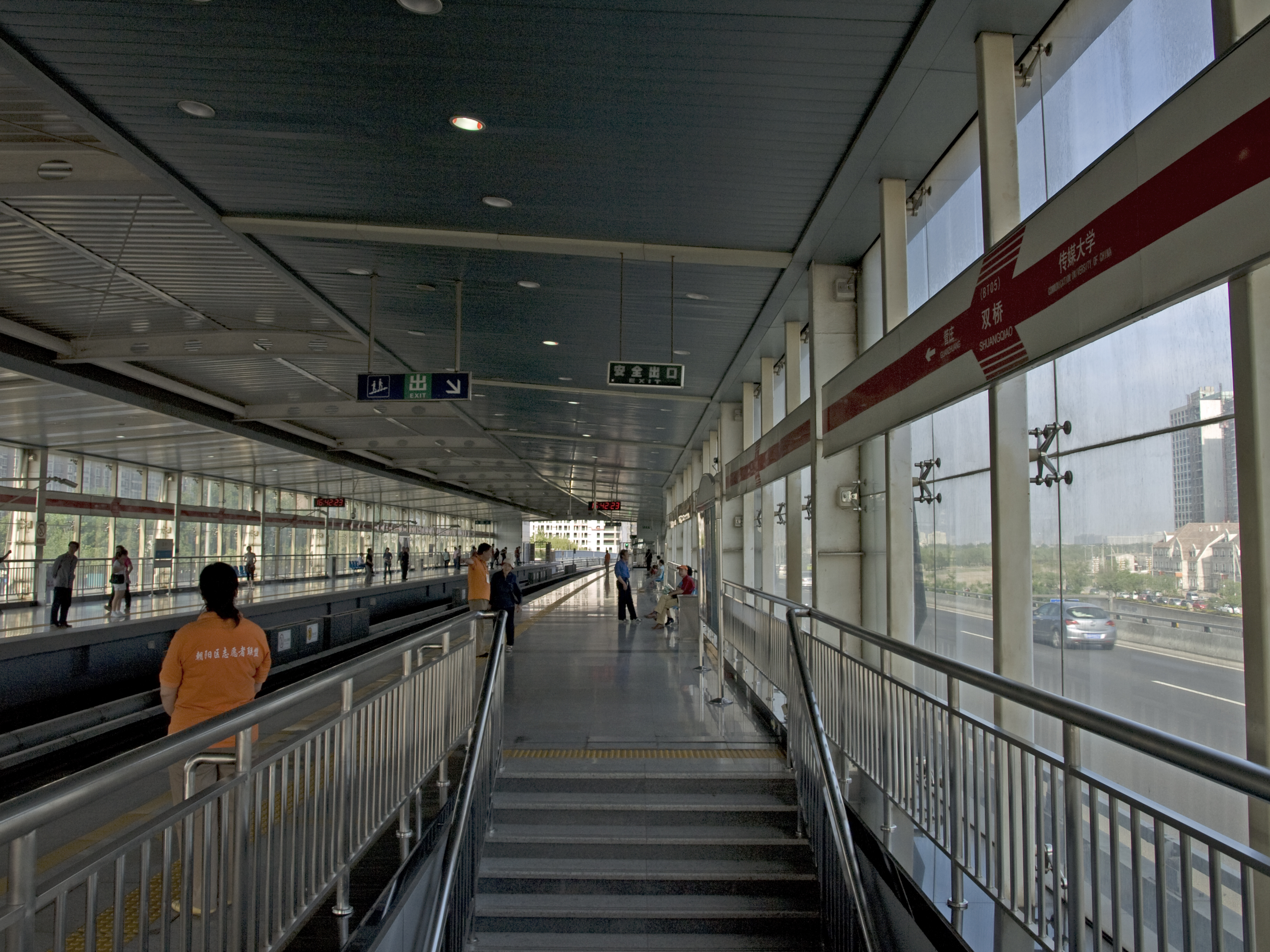
Platform before the installation of platform gates

== Exits ==
There are 2 exits, lettered A and B. Both are accessible.
