= Guaanzhuang station =

Beijing Subway station

Guaanzhuang 管庄
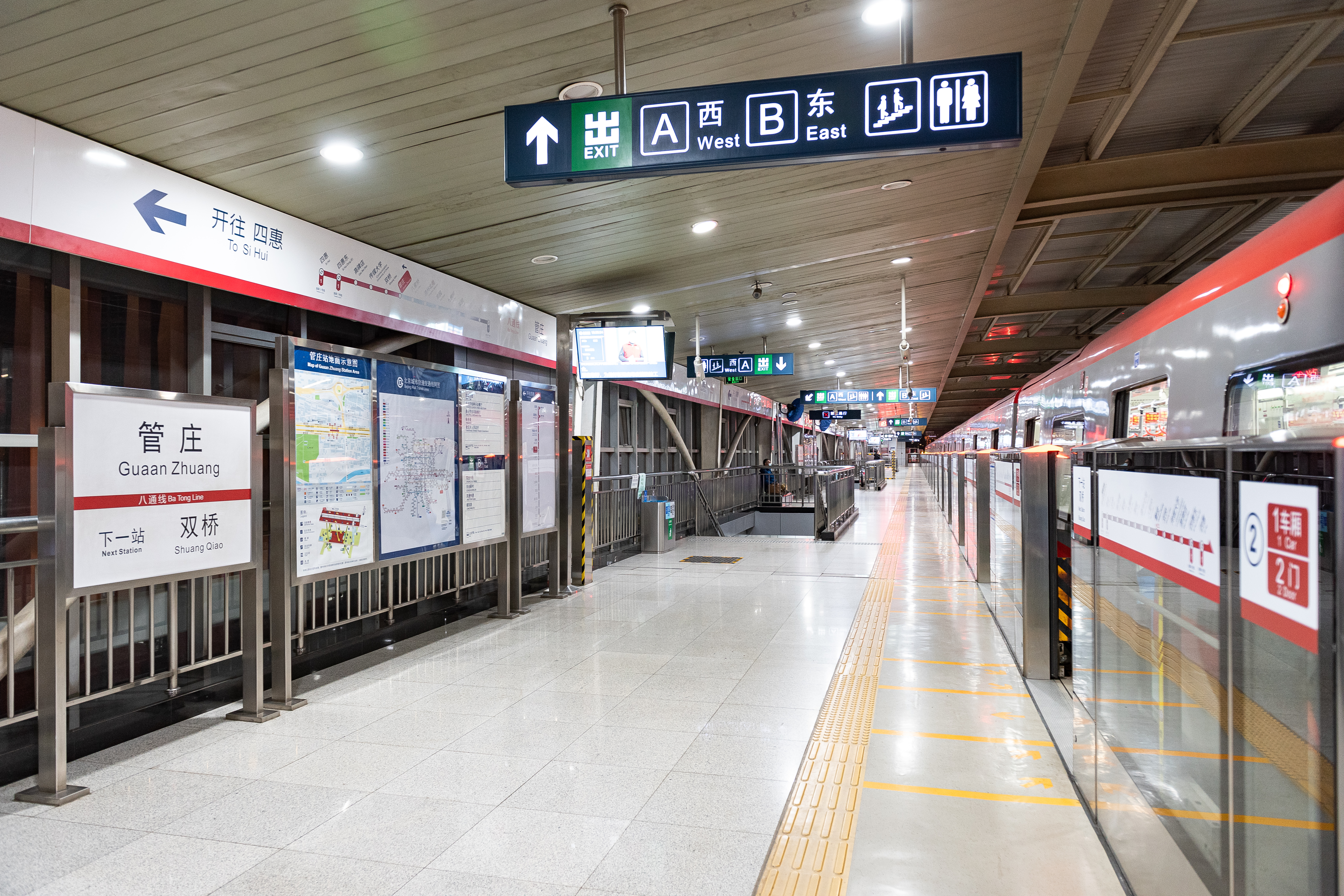
- Westbound platform

General information
- Location: Guanzhuang, Chaoyang District, Beijing; China
- Coordinates: 39.9092°N 116.5990°E
- Operator: Beijing Mass Transit Railway Operation Corporation Limited
- Lines: Batong line; Line 22 (opening 2026)
- Platforms: 2 (2 side platforms)
- Tracks: 2

Construction
- Structure type: Elevated
- Accessible: Yes

Other information
- Station code: BT06

History
- Opened: December 27, 2003; 22 years ago

Services
Preceding station	Beijing Subway	Following station
Shuang Qiao towards Gucheng	Batong line	Bali Qiao towards Universal Resort
Future services
Dingfuzhuang towards Dongdaqiao	Line 22 Opening 2026	Yongshun towards Pinggu
Location
- Location within Beijing

Guaanzhuang station (simplified Chinese: 管庄站; traditional Chinese: 管莊站; pinyin: Guǎnzhuāng zhàn) is a station on the Batong line of the Beijing Subway, and is located in the Guanzhuang area (管庄地区) of Chaoyang District.

In future, it will be a transfer station with the Pinggu line (Line 22) which is currently under construction.

== History ==
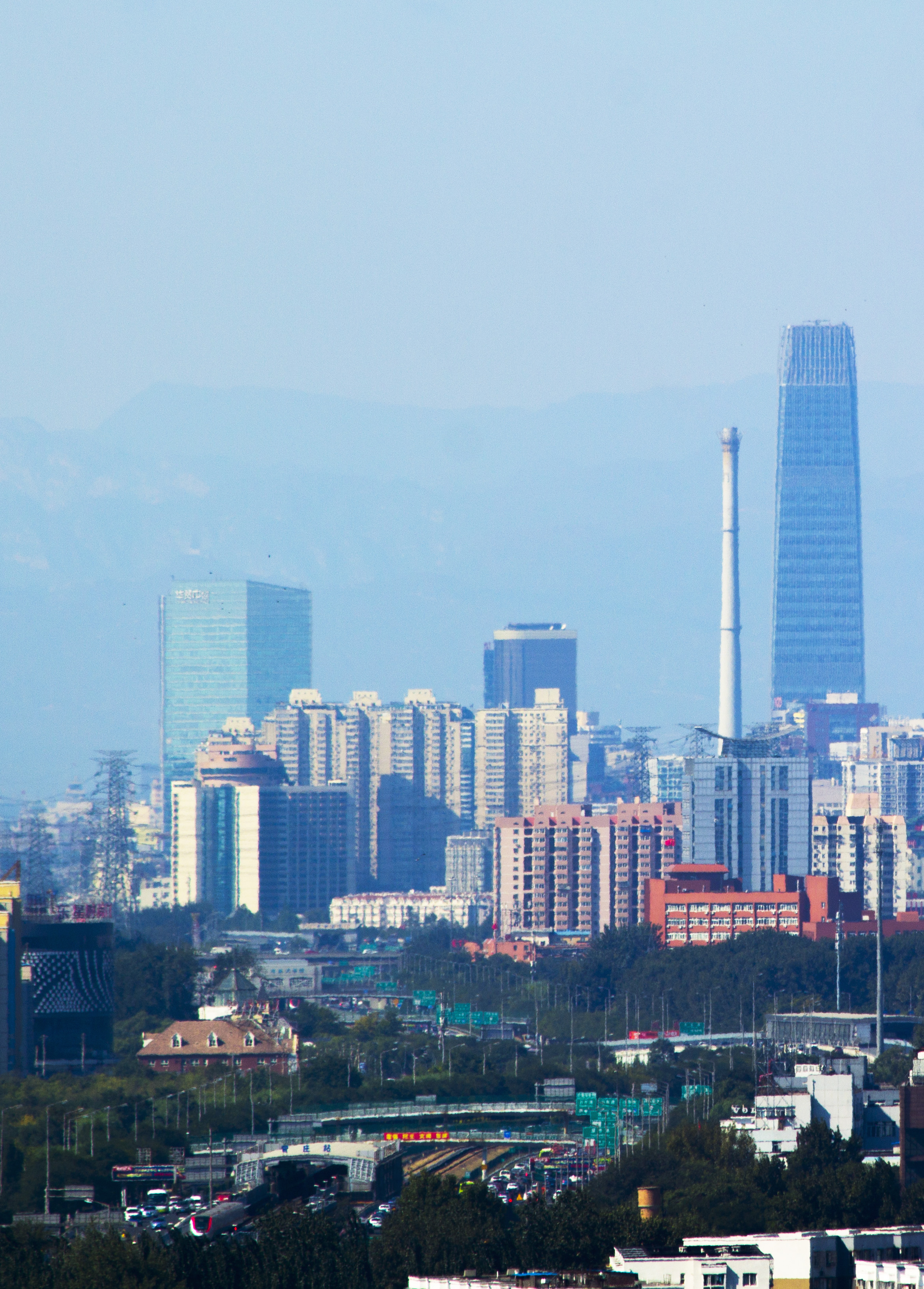
Guaanzhuang Station (bottom), taken from Tongzhou district

Guaanzhuang station opened on December 27, 2003. The installation of automatic platform gates started on August 9, 2012, and finished in September 2012.

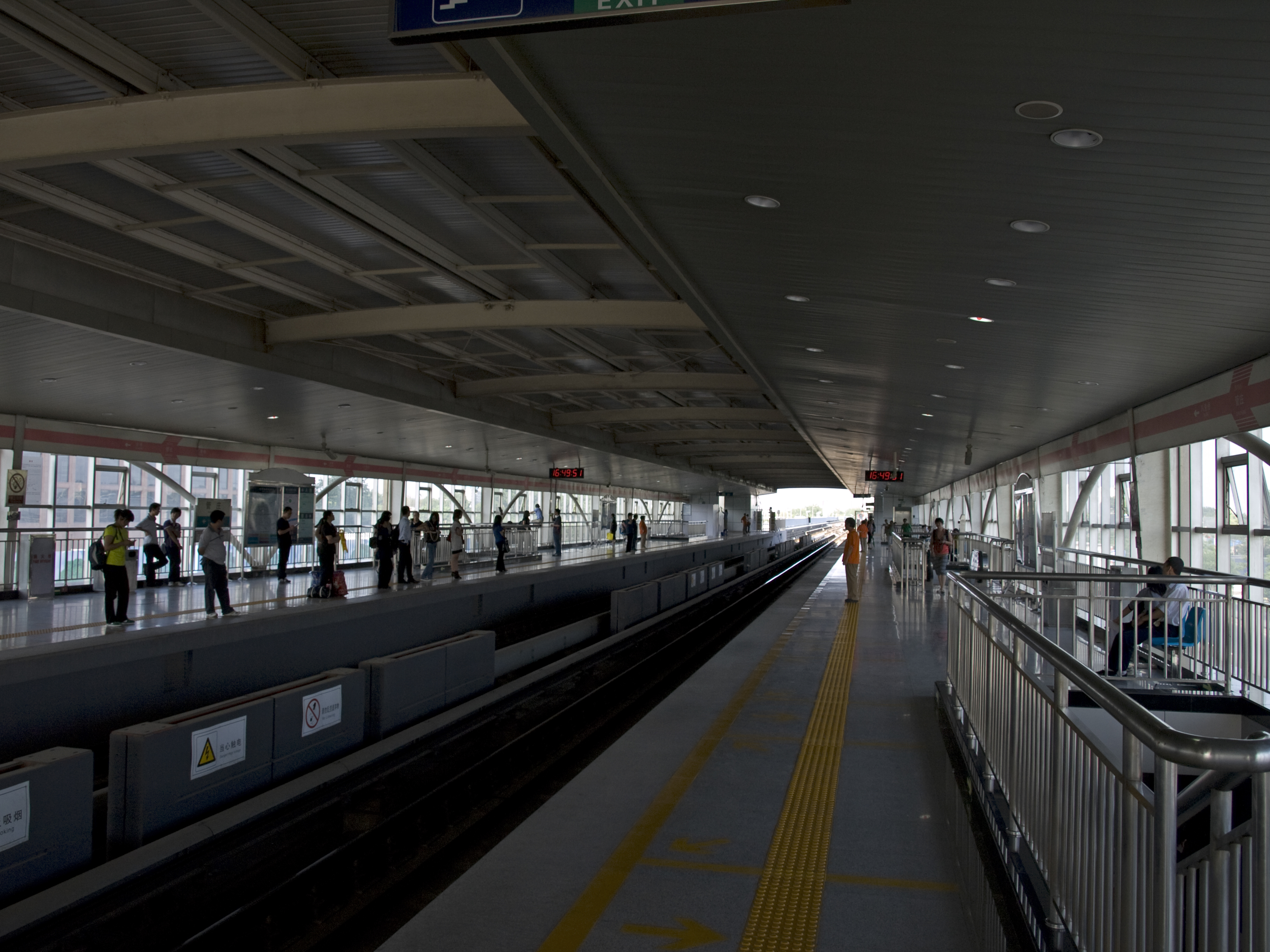
Guaanzhuang Station before the installation of platform screen doors

=== Name conflict ===
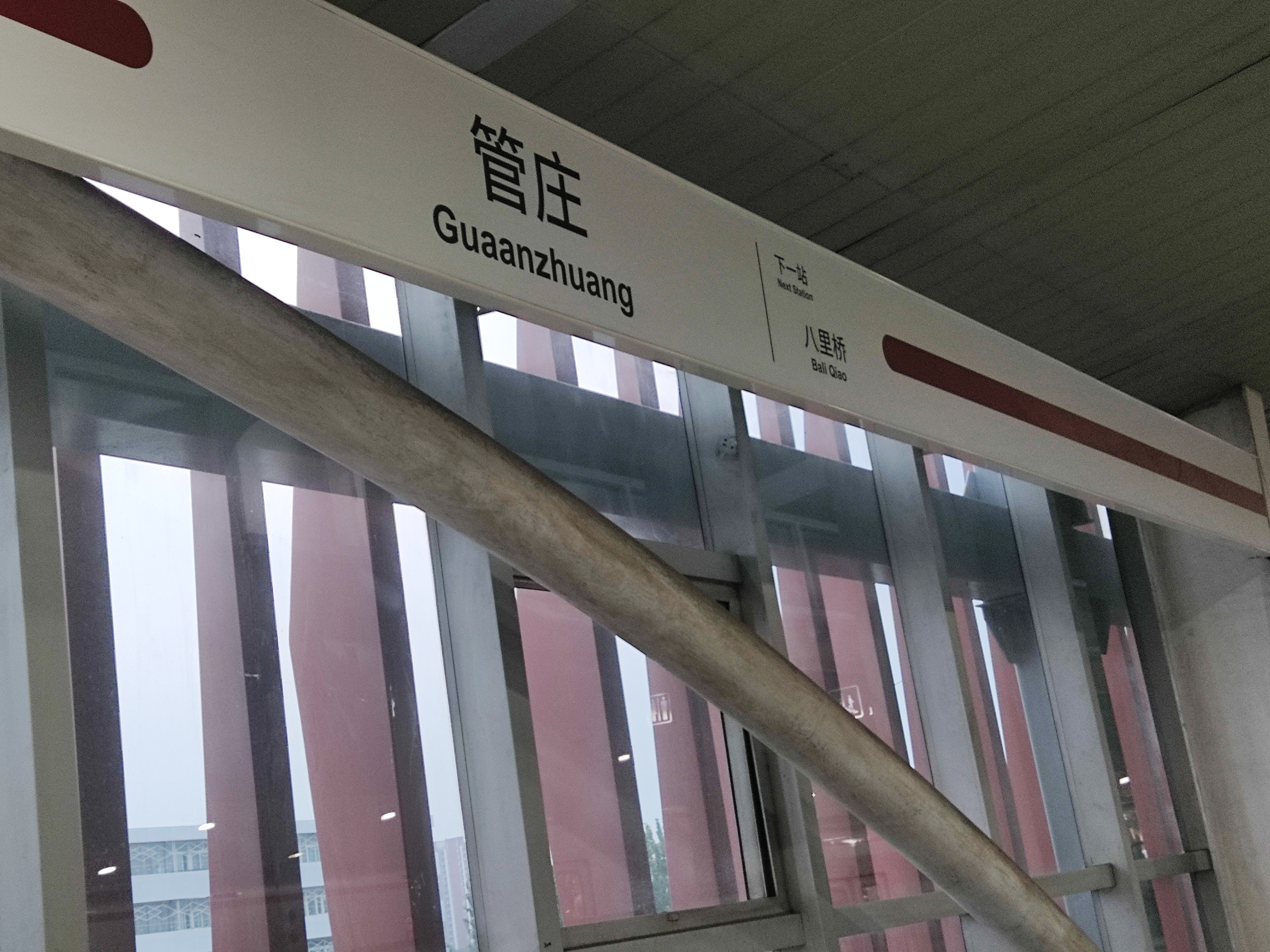
Guaanzhuang station in 2024.

This station had the same English name as a station on Line 15, also part of the Beijing Subway system. In Chinese this is not a problem as the station on Line 15 is called 关庄 and one on the Batong Line is called 管庄, but the government policy in China is to create English names from the pinyin transliteration of Chinese language, but without the tone markers; thus 关庄 (Guānzhuāng) and 管庄 (Guǎnzhuāng) are both rendered as Guanzhuang, making them look identical.

In December 2019, the 管庄 (Guǎnzhuāng) station on Batong line changed spelling to Guaanzhuang.

== Station layout ==
The station has 2 elevated side platforms.

== Exits ==
There are 6 exits, lettered A1, A2, A3, A4, B1, and B2. Exits B1 and B2 are accessible.
