= Guoyuan station =

Beijing Subway station

Guoyuan 果园
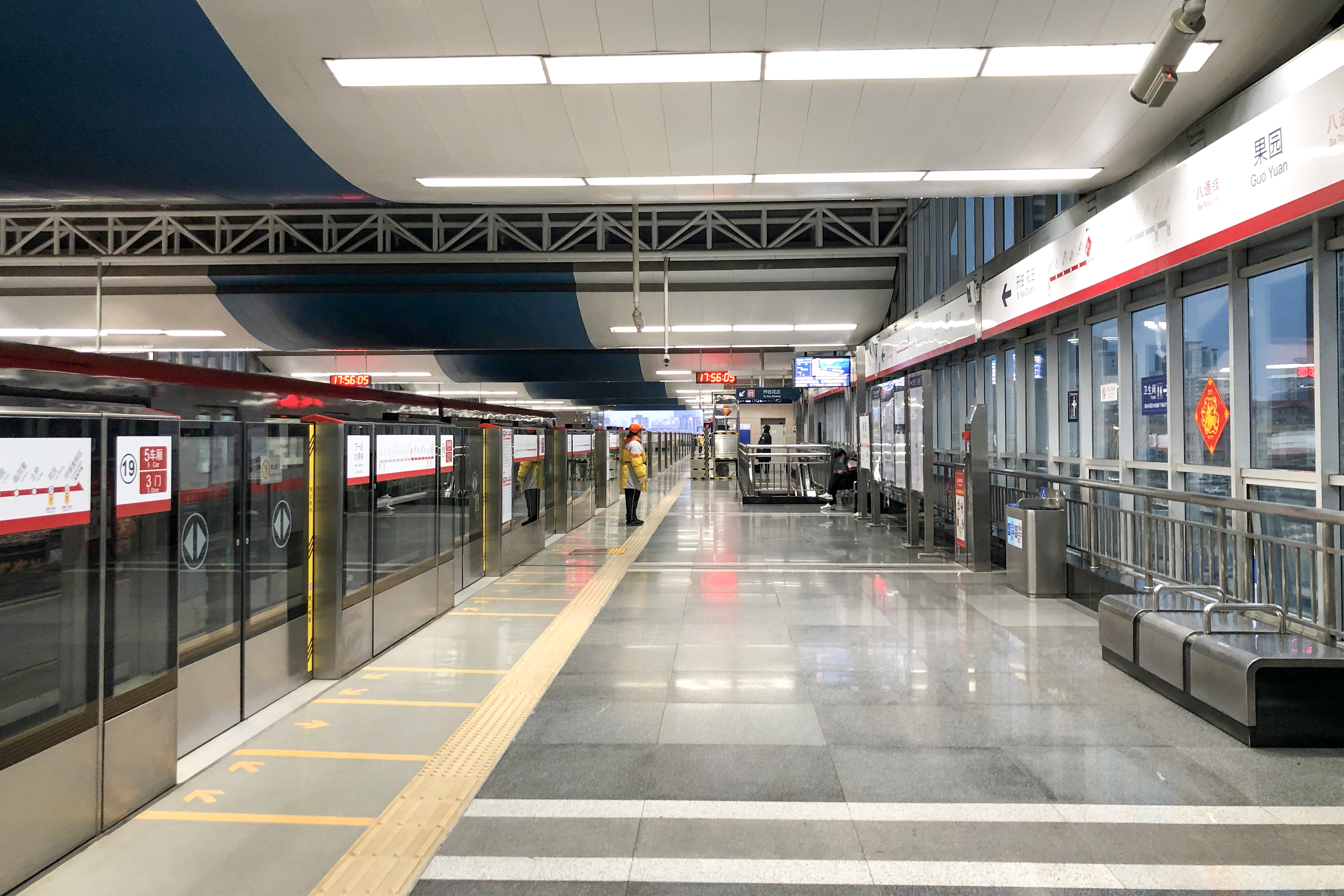
- Platform

General information
- Location: Beiyuan Road (北苑路) and West Yunhe Street (运河西大街); Tongzhou District, Beijing; China
- Coordinates: 39°53′36″N 116°38′48″E
- Operator: Beijing Mass Transit Railway Operation Corporation Limited
- Line: Batong line
- Platforms: 2 (2 side platforms)
- Tracks: 2

Construction
- Structure type: Elevated
- Accessible: Yes

Other information
- Station code: BT09

History
- Opened: December 27, 2003; 22 years ago

Services
Preceding station	Beijing Subway	Following station
Tongzhou Beiyuan towards Gucheng	Batong line	Jiukeshu towards Universal Resort
Location
- Location within Beijing

Guoyuan Station (simplified Chinese: 果园站; traditional Chinese: 果園站; pinyin: Guǒyuán Zhàn) is a station on the Batong line of the Beijing Subway.

== Station layout ==
The station has 2 elevated side platforms.

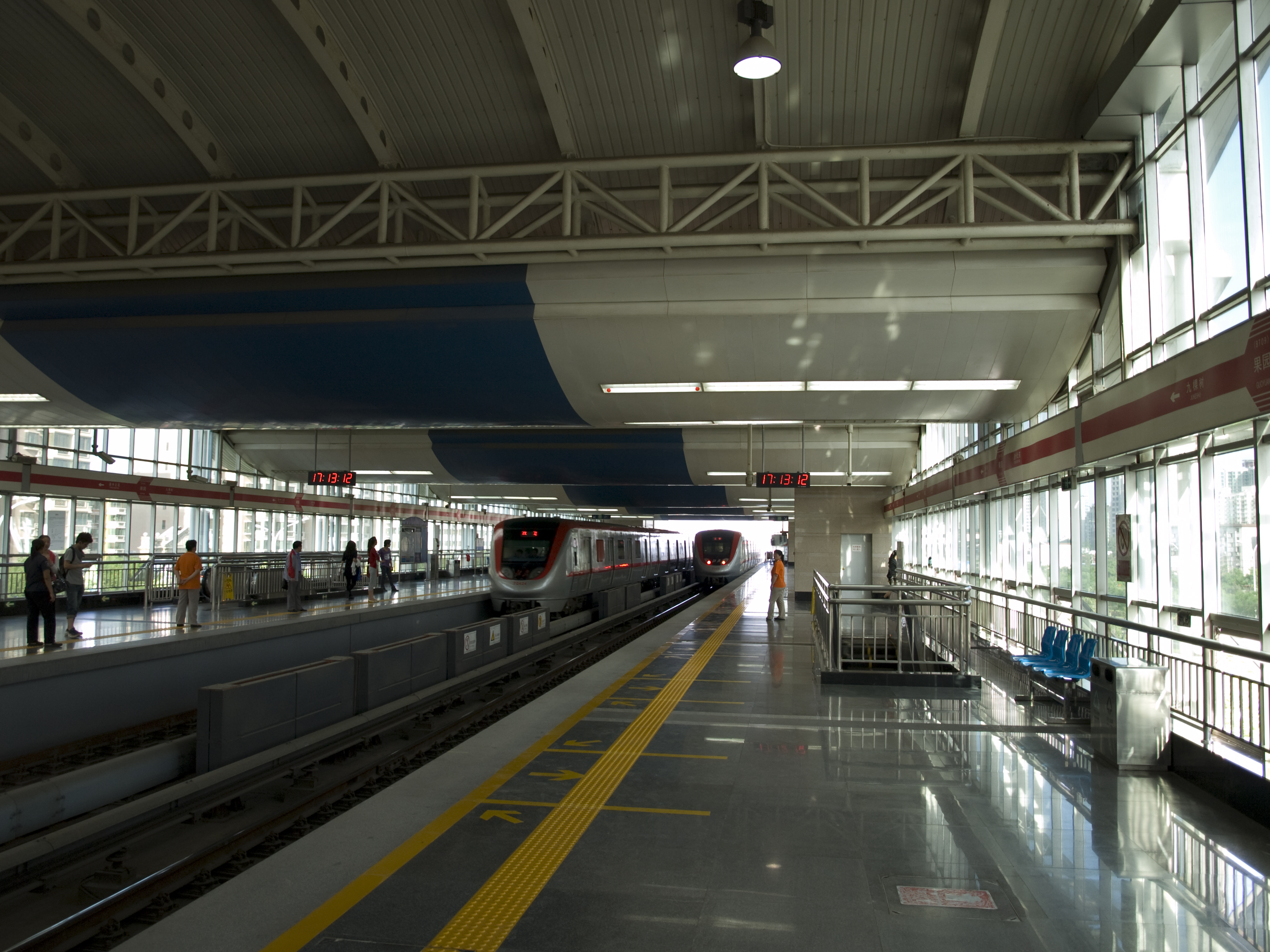
Platform before the installation of platform gates

== Exits ==
There are 2 exits, lettered A and B. Exit B is accessible.

== See also ==
- Pingguoyuan station, another station on Line 1
