= Huazhuang station =

Beijing Subway station

Huazhuang 花庄
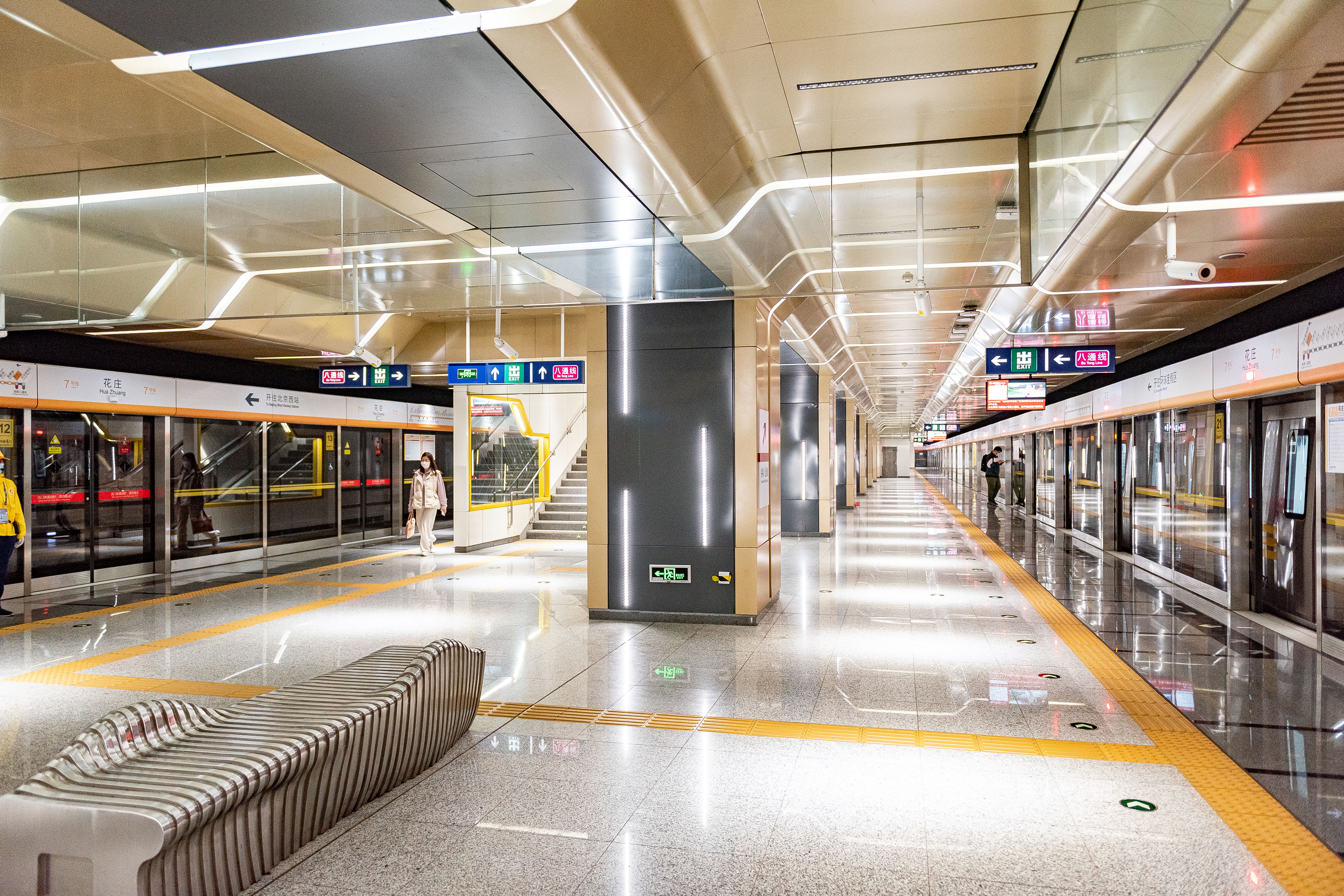
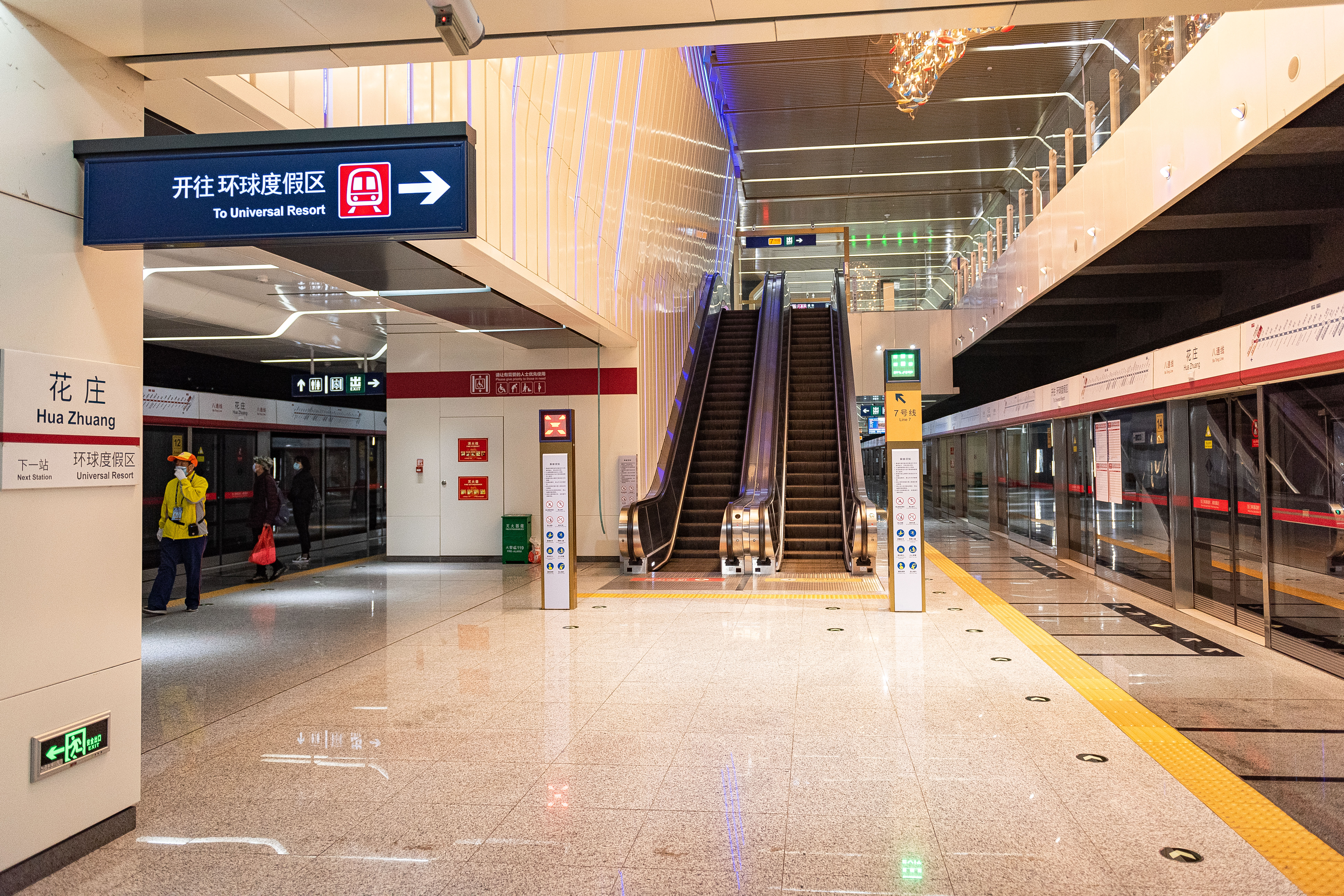
- Line 7 platform Batong Line platform

General information
- Location: Huazhuang Village, Liyuan Town, Tongzhou District, Beijing; China
- Coordinates: 39.8553663°N 116.6891062°E
- Operator: Beijing Mass Transit Railway Operation Corporation Limited
- Lines: Line 7 Batong line
- Platforms: 4 (2 island platforms)
- Tracks: 4

Construction
- Structure type: Underground
- Accessible: Yes

History
- Opened: December 28, 2019; 6 years ago

Services
Preceding station	Beijing Subway	Following station
Gaoloujin towards Beijing West railway station	Line 7	Universal Resort Terminus
Tu Qiao towards Gucheng	Batong line	Universal Resort Terminus
Location
- Location within Beijing

Huazhuang station (Chinese: 花庄站; pinyin: Huāzhuāng zhàn) is a subway station on Line 7 and the Batong line of the Beijing Subway. It is located in Huazhuang Village in Liyuan Town in Tongzhou District. It has a double-island platform. It is operated by Beijing Mass Transit Railway Operation Corporation Limited. The station was the eastern terminus for both lines until Universal Resort station opened on August 26, 2021.

== Station layout ==
Both the line 7 and Batong line stations have underground island platforms.

== Exits ==
There are 4 exits, lettered A, B, C, and D. Exits A and C are accessible.

== Gallery ==
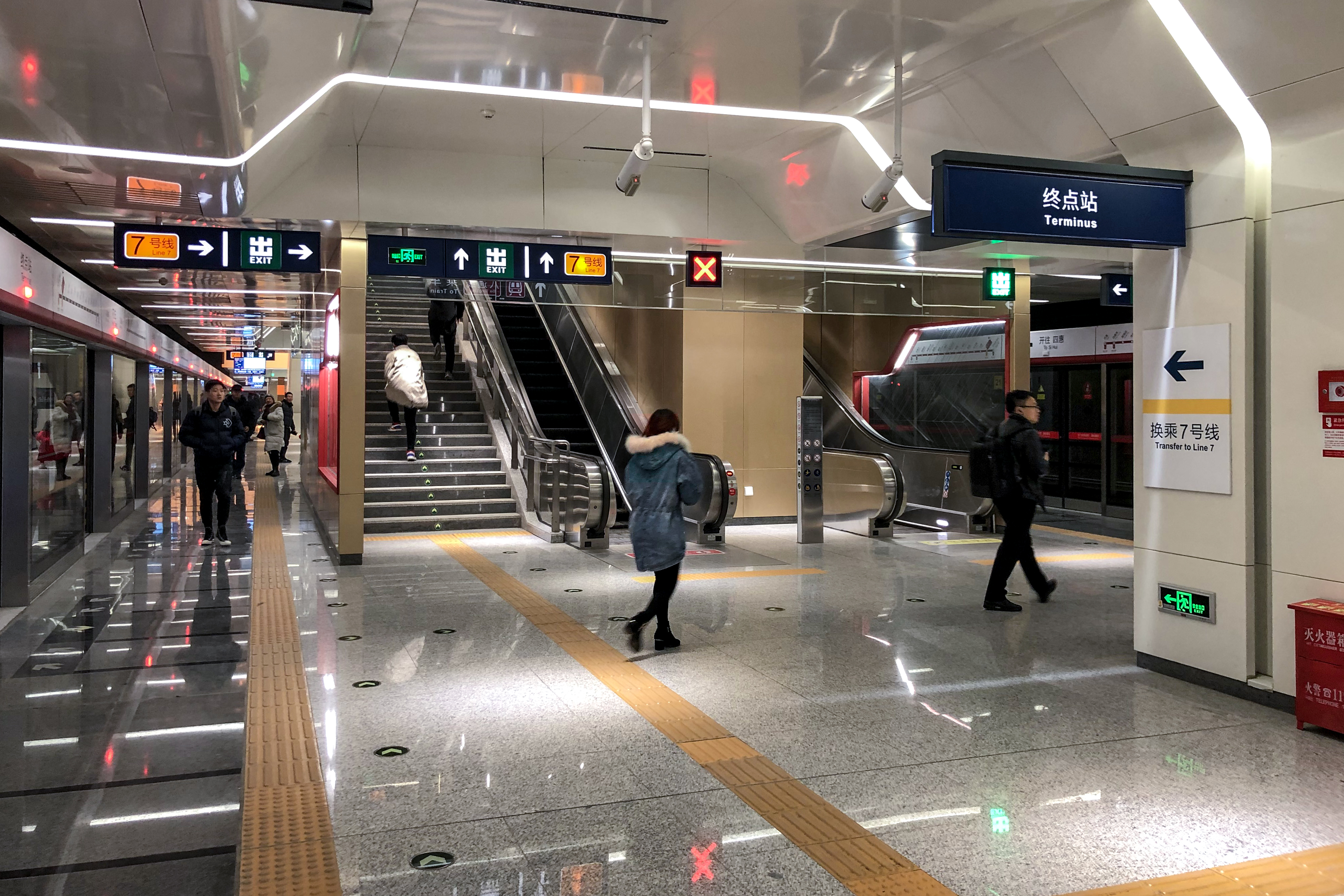
Ba Tong Line Platform before through service

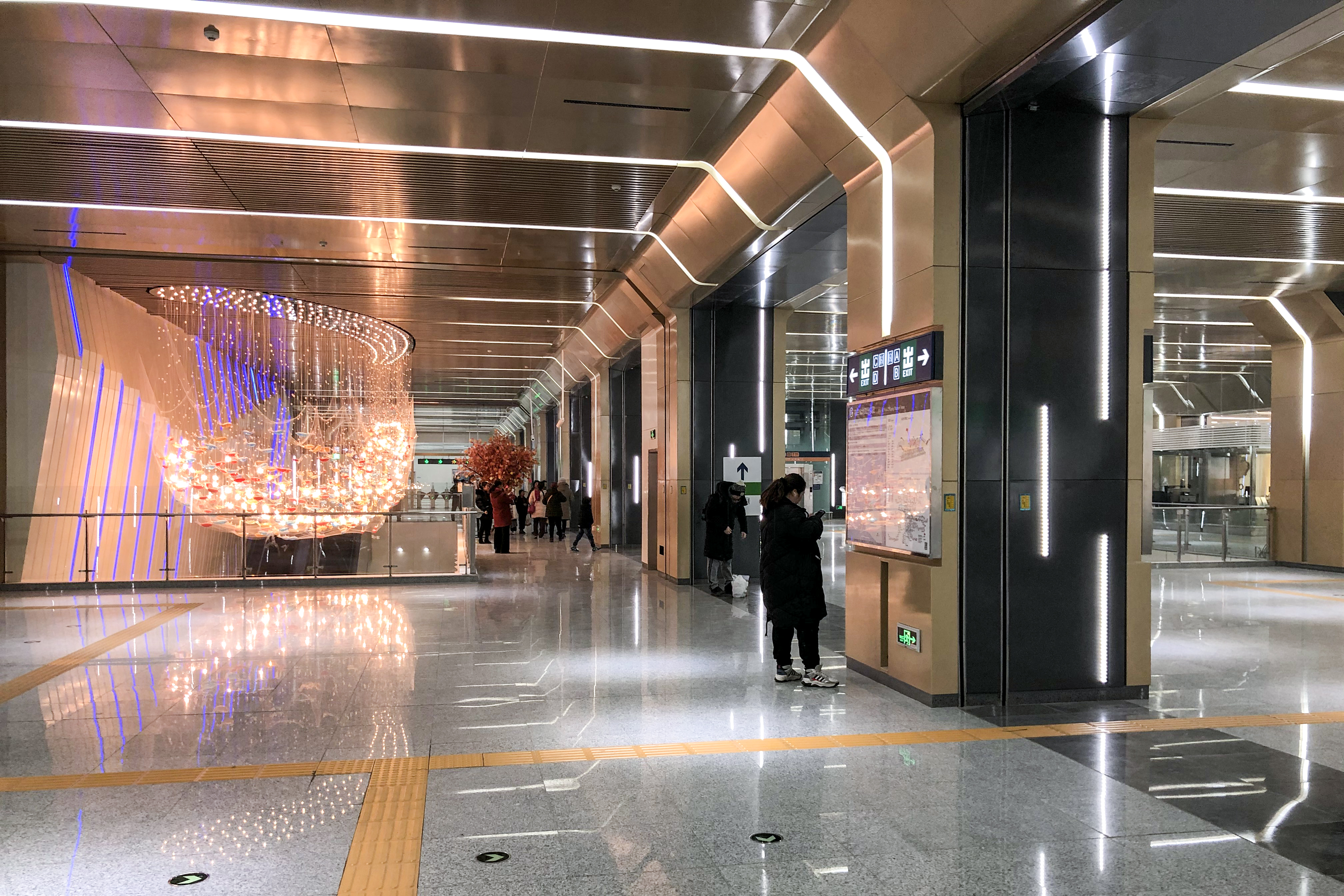
Concourse
