= Tuqiao station (Beijing Subway) =

Beijing Subway station

Tu Qiao 土桥
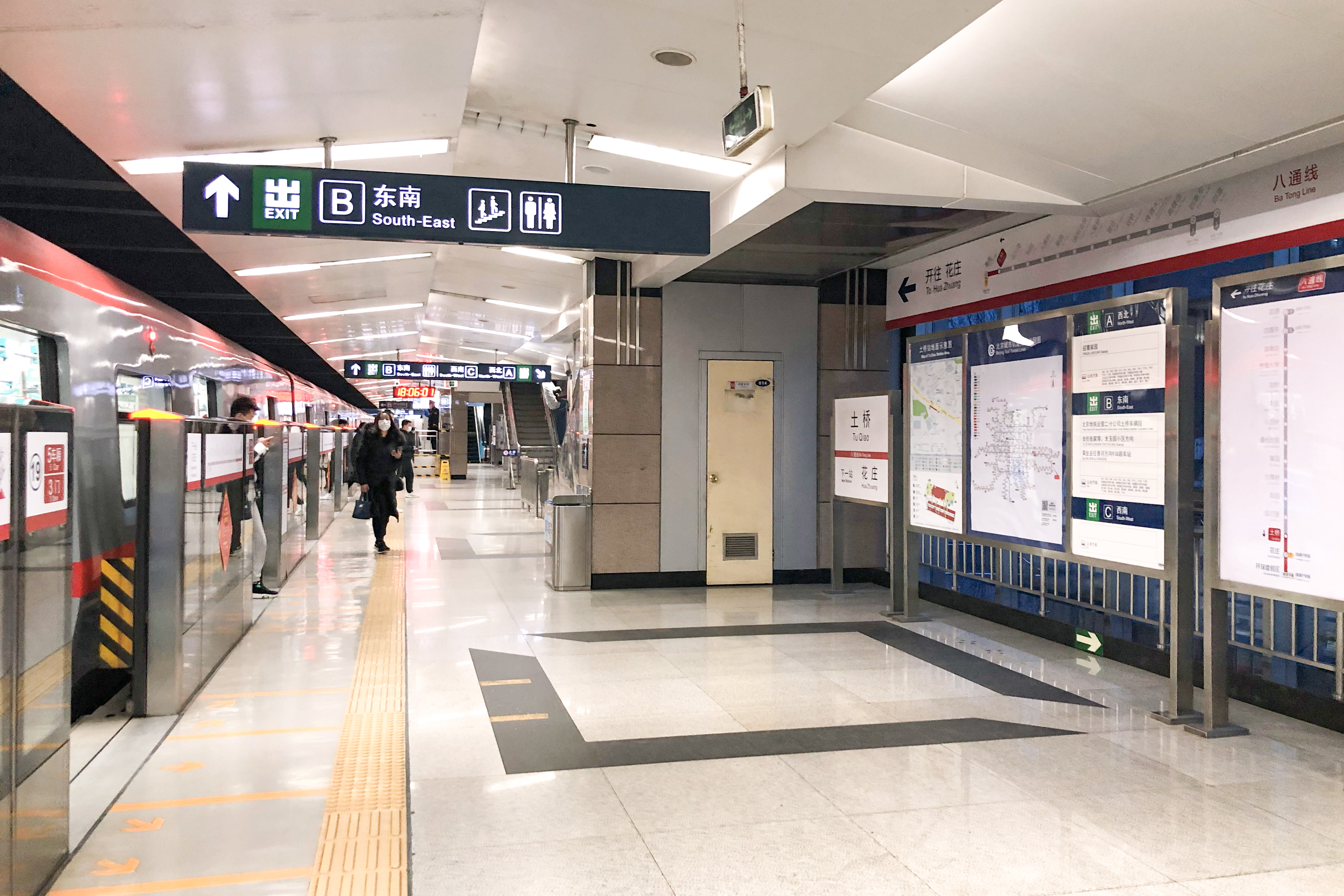
- Platform

General information
- Location: East Jiukeshu Road (九棵树东路); Tongzhou District, Beijing; China
- Coordinates: 39°52′18″N 116°41′10″E
- Operator: Beijing Mass Transit Railway Operation Corporation Limited
- Line: Batong line
- Platforms: 2 (2 side platforms)
- Tracks: 2

Construction
- Structure type: At-grade
- Accessible: Yes

Other information
- Station code: BT13

History
- Opened: December 27, 2003; 22 years ago

Services
| Preceding station | Beijing Subway | Following station |
|---|---|---|
| Linheli towards Gucheng | Batong line | Huazhuang towards Universal Resort |
Location
- Location within Beijing

Tu Qiao (simplified Chinese: 土桥站; traditional Chinese: 土橋站; pinyin: Tǔ Qiáo Zhàn) is a station on the Batong line of the Beijing Subway. It opened on December 27, 2003.

Tu Qiao is on the eastern stretch of the 5th Ring Road and there is an exit there.

== Station layout ==
The station has 2 at-grade side platforms.

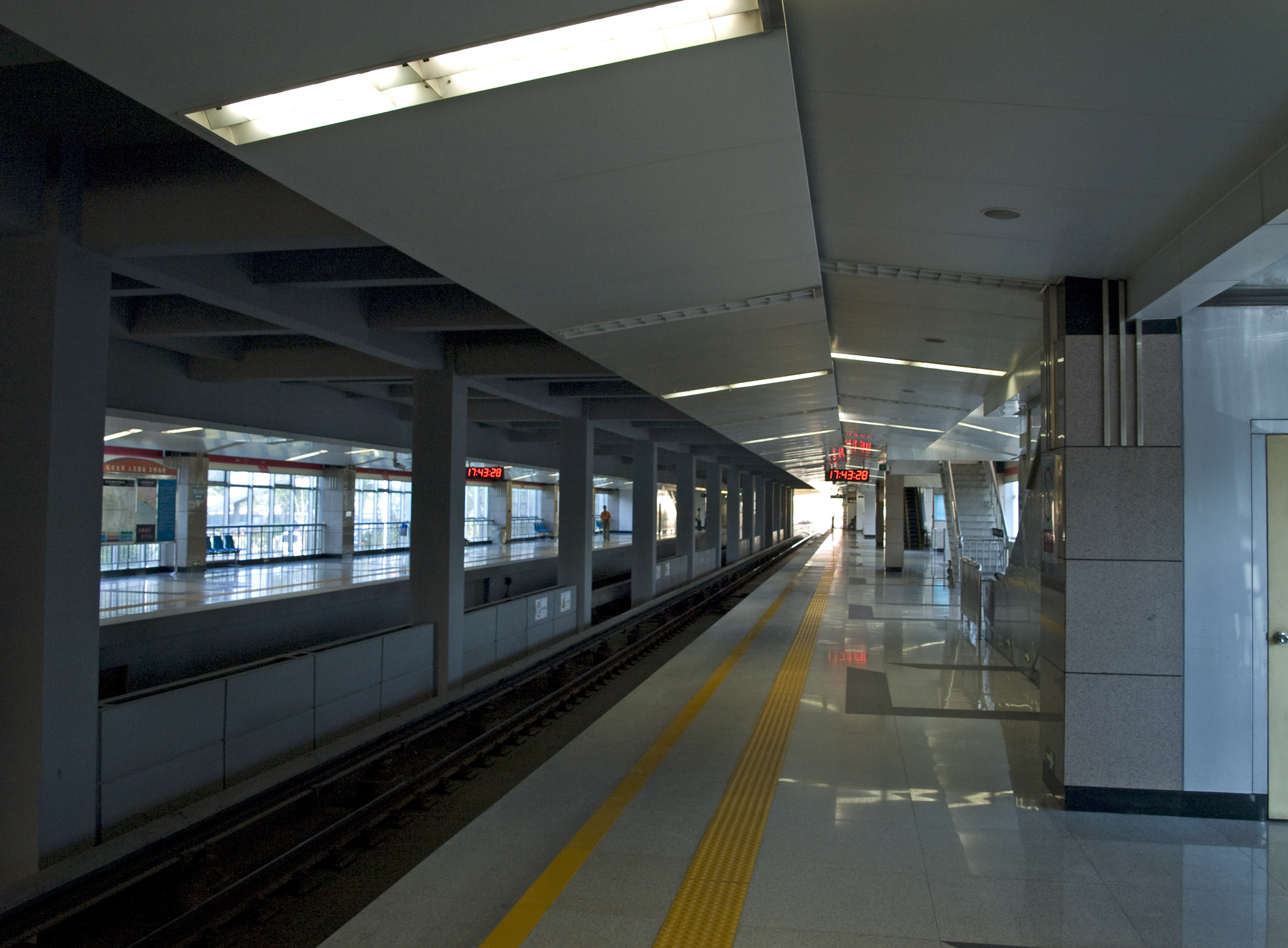
Platform before the extension of Batong line

== Exits ==
There are 3 exits, lettered A, B, and C. Exit A is accessible.
