= Batong line =

Railway line of the Beijing Subway

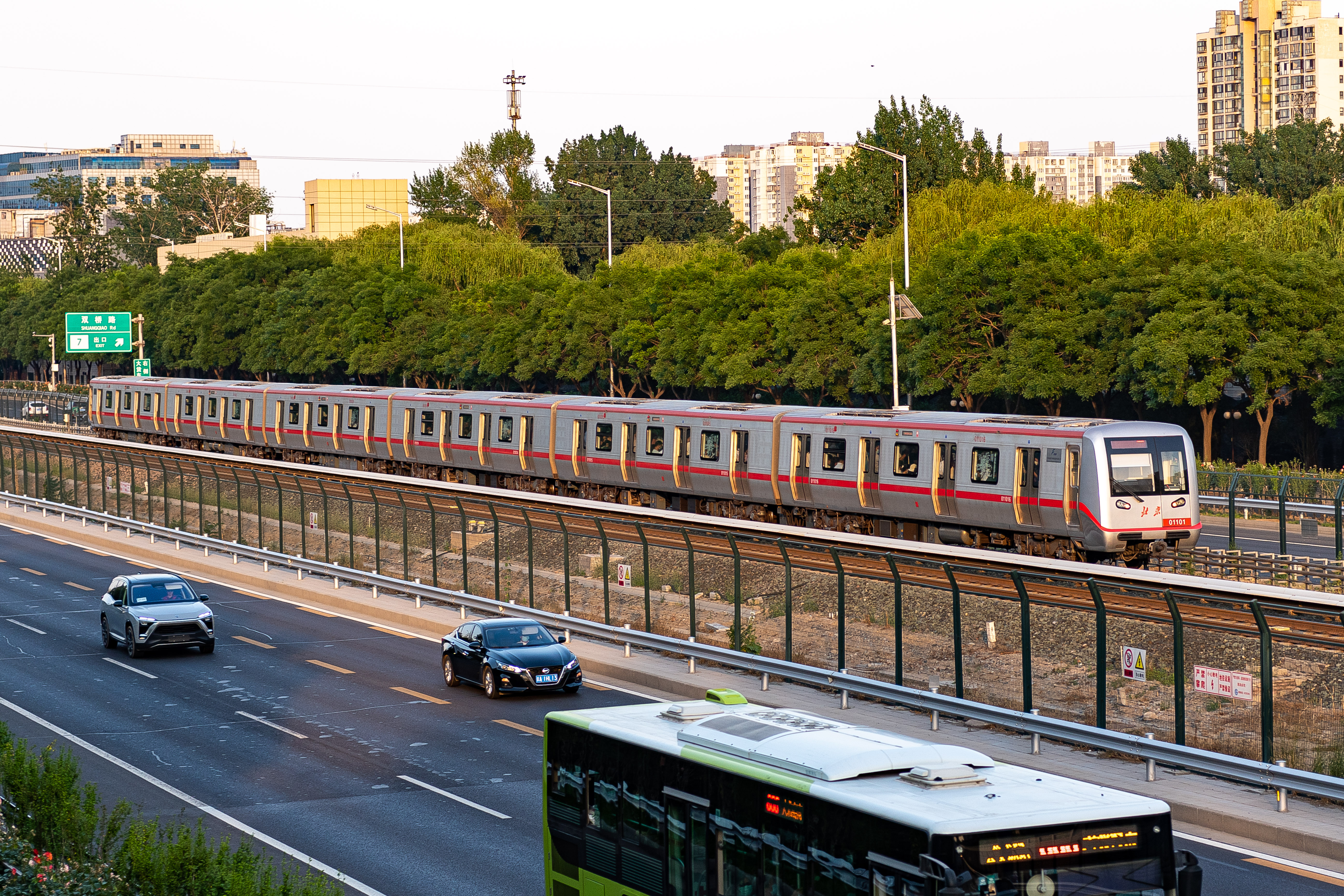
- Batong line train between Communication University of China and Shuang Qiao in May 2021

Overview
- Other names: M1 East (planned name); Line 1 East; Line BT
- Status: Operational
- Locale: Tongzhou and Chaoyang districts Beijing
- Termini: Sihui; Universal Resort
- Stations: 15

Service
- Type: Rapid transit
- System: Beijing Subway
- Operator(s): Beijing Mass Transit Railway Operation Corporation Limited
- Depot(s): Sihui, Tuqiao
- Rolling stock: 6-car Type B (SFM01, SFM02, SFM07, BDK06)
- Ridership: 300,600 (2014 Avg.); 364,800 (2014 Peak)

History
- Opened: December 27, 2003; 21 years ago

Technical
- Line length: 23.4 km (14.5 mi)
- Character: Elevated, at-grade, underground
- Track gauge: 1,435 mm (4 ft 8 1/2 in) standard gauge
- Electrification: Third rail 750 V DC

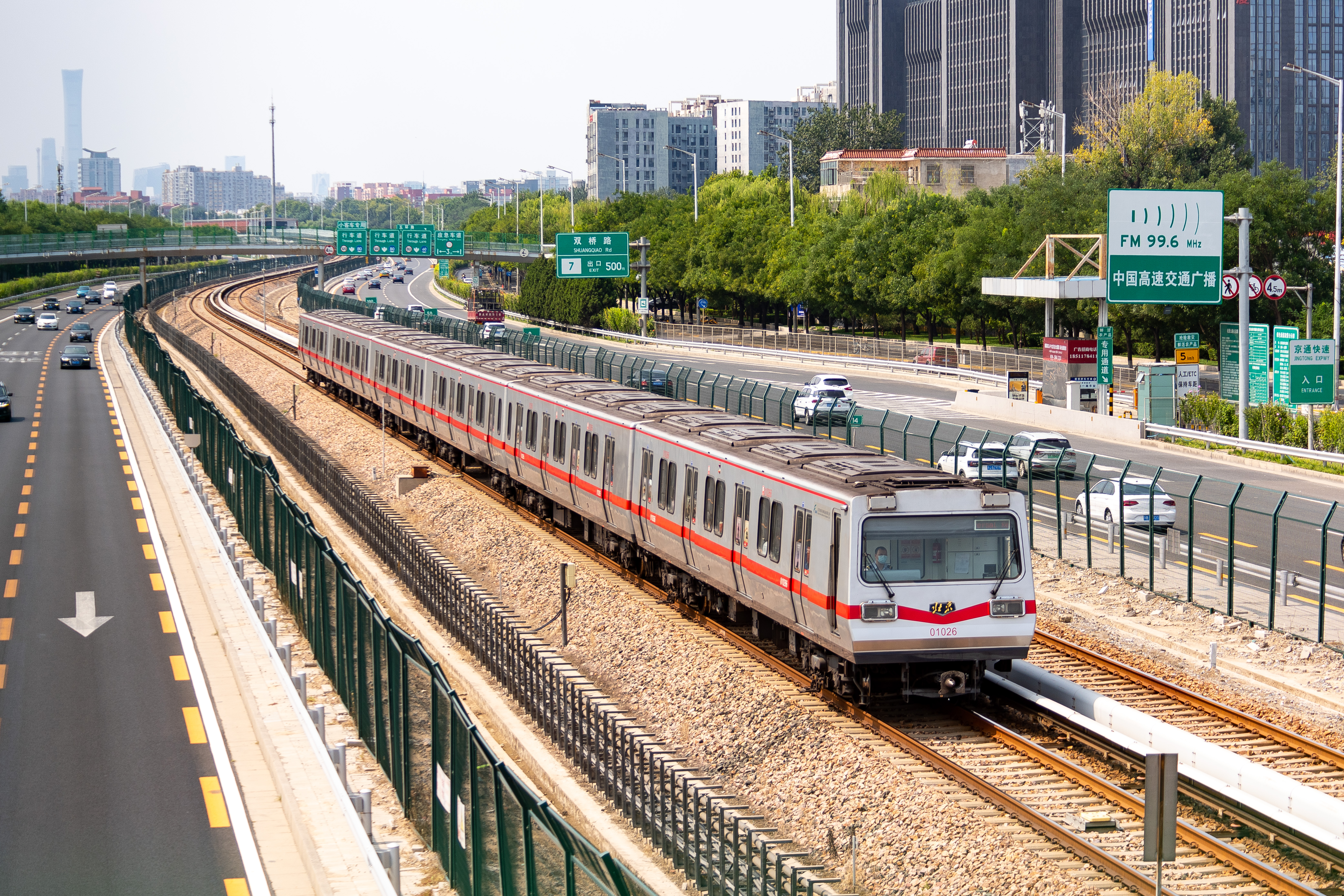
From 29 August 2021, Line 1 trains began to run Batong Line

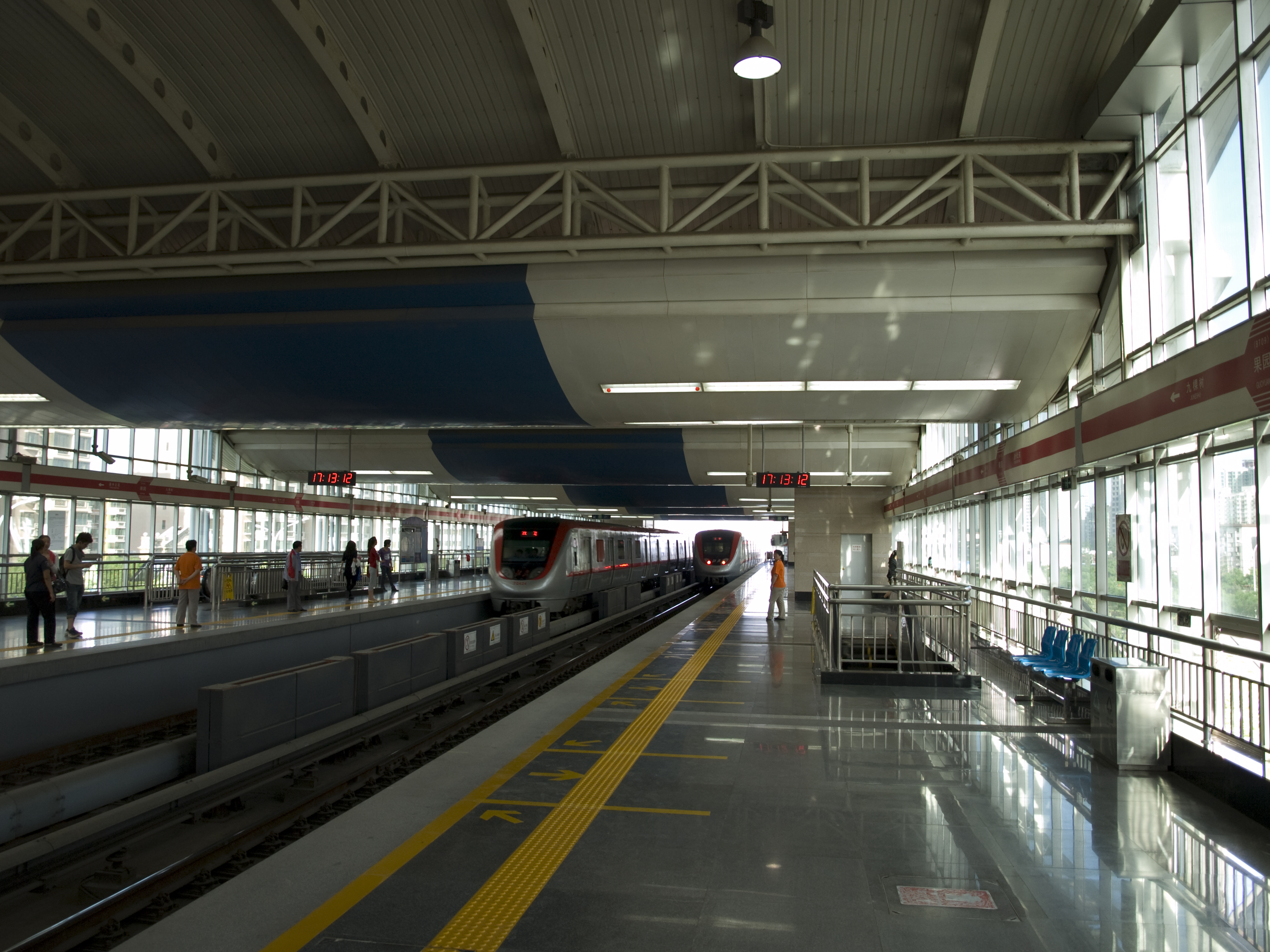
Two Batong line trains at Guoyuan station before renovation

The Batong Line of the Beijing Subway (Chinese: 北京地铁八通线; pinyin: Běijīng dìtiě Bātōng xiàn) is an east–west rapid transit line in eastern Beijing. It extends Line 1 further east from Sihui in Chaoyang District to Universal Resort in Tongzhou District. Through operation with Line 1 started on August 29, 2021.

The Batong Line derives its name by combining the first character of Bawangfen (八王坟), another name for Sihui, and Tongzhou (通州), the eastern suburban district of Beijing which the line serves.

The Batong Line is mainly above ground with only 3.8 km (2.4 mi) section is underground and runs 23.4 km (14.5 mi) from Sihui in the west to Universal Resort in the east. The color of the Batong Line that is shown on maps, like that of Line 1, is dark red.

The line tends to be very crowded during rush hour. To alleviate this headways were reduced and express services were introduced during rush hour in early 2020. However, these express services were removed with the start of through operation with Line 1 in mid 2021.

== Hours of operation ==
The first east-bound train departs Sihui at 6:00 am. The first west-bound train departs Huazhuang at 5:16 am. The last east-bound train leaves Sihui at 11:40 pm. The last west-bound train leaves Huazhuang at 10:56 pm.

== Route ==
The Batong Line follows the Beijing-Tongzhou Expressway eastward from Sihui to Guǎnzhuang. Between Gaobeidian and Guǎnzhuang, the Batong Line and its stations are built into the highway's median. At Bali Qiao, the Batong Line turns to the southeast and follows the Jingtang Road to Tu Qiao, which is located just inside the Tuqiao Bridge exit on the eastern 6th Ring Road. From there, the line turns and follows the 6th Ring Road south and west to Huazhuang and Universal Resort.

== Stations (from West to East) ==
Station list for Line 1 and Batong line of Beijing Subway, after the through operation started on August 29, 2021.
● Normal: Gucheng — Universal Resort
● Morning rush hour: Gongzhufen — Guoyuan
● Evening rush hour: Gucheng — Guoyuan

| Line Name | Service routes | | | Station Name | | Connections | Nearby Bus Stops | Distance km | | Location |
| Line Name | Service routes | | | English | Chinese | Connections | Nearby Bus Stops | Distance km | | Location |
|---|---|---|---|---|---|---|---|---|---|---|
| Line 1 | | | | Fushouling (Opening 2026) | 福寿岭 | | | | | Shijingshan |
| Line 1 | | | | Pingguoyuan (Under renovation, re-opening 2026) | 苹果园 | 6 S1 | 325 336 358 370 396 399 472 527 597 664 876 892 920 929 931 932 941快 948 961 972 977 977快 981 快速直达专线142 快速直达专线150 M3 M4 M5 M6 M7 M11 M16 M20 M22 | 0.000 | 0.000 | Shijingshan |
| Line 1 | ● | | ● | Gucheng | 古城 | | 318 327 337 399 597 941 958 959 992 快速直达专线208 快速直达专线213 快速直达专线222 夜5 专61 专198 专210 专218 | 2.606 | 2.606 | Shijingshan |
| Line 1 | ｜ | | ｜ | Bajiao Amusement Park (Under renovation, re-opening May 3, 2027) | 八角游乐园 | | 325 337 373 436 472 527 574 597 598 663 914 941 959 965 992 夜5 专46 专86 专91 专111 专215 | 1.921 | 4.527 | Shijingshan |
| Line 1 | ● | | ● | Babaoshan | 八宝山 | | 1 76 337 373 527 546 574 597 610 914 941 951 961 979 快速直达专线187 夜1 专69 专109 专111 专150 专215 | 1.953 | 6.480 | Shijingshan |
| Line 1 | ● | | ● | Yuquan Lu | 玉泉路 | | 1 76 78 337 338 354 370 373 389 436 452 463 472 473 481 507 610 612 644 941 941快 979 夜1 专11 | 1.479 | 7.959 | Shijingshan |
| Line 1 | ● | | ● | Wukesong | 五棵松 | | 1 64 76 97 337 370 400 400快 436 568 624 952 967 982 983 夜1 专127 | 1.810 | 9.769 | Haidian |
| Line 1 | ● | | ● | Wanshou Lu | 万寿路 | | 1 32 33 64 68 76 77 89 308 335 337 370 624 627 夜1 夜5 夜16 | 1.778 | 11.547 | Haidian |
| Line 1 | ● | ● | ● | Gongzhufen | 公主坟 | 10 | 1 32 33 40 52 62 64 68 74 76 77 89 94 134 300 300快 308 323 335 337 368 370 374 394 437 603 624 631快 698 977 977快 夜1 夜5 夜30 | 1.313 | 12.860 | Haidian |
| Line 1 | ● | ● | ● | Military Museum | 军事博物馆 | 9 | 1 21 40 52 65 68 78 85 94 308 414 夜1 夜5 夜8 | 1.172 | 14.032 | Haidian |
| Line 1 | ● | ● | ● | Muxidi | 木樨地 | 16 (out-of-system interchange) | 1 21 32 52 65 68 78 85 94 114 308 320 夜1 夜8 | 1.166 | 15.198 | Xicheng |
| Line 1 | ● | ● | ● | Nanlishi Lu | 南礼士路 | | 1 3 10 15 19 46 49 52 56 夜1 夜8 夜12 | 1.291 | 16.489 | Xicheng |
| Line 1 | ● | ● | ● | Fuxingmen | 复兴门 | 2; 19 (Out-of-system interchange via Taipingqiao) | 1 10 15 44 49 52 200 332 387 395 423 691 快速直达专线17 快速直达专线201 夜1 夜20 专191 | 0.424 | 16.913 | Xicheng |
| Line 1 | ● | ● | ● | Xidan | 西单 | 4 | 1 7 15 22 52 83 88 102 105 109 143 快速直达专线17 夜1 夜4 | 1.590 | 18.503 | Xicheng |
| Line 1 | ● | ● | ● | Tian'anmenxi | 天安门西 | | 1 5 52 观光1 观光2 夜1 | 1.217 | 19.720 | Xicheng |
| Line 1 | ● | ● | ● | Tian'anmendong | 天安门东 | | 1 2 52 82 120 观光1 观光2 夜1 夜2 | 0.925 | 20.645 | Dongcheng |
| Line 1 | ● | ● | ● | Wangfujing | 王府井 | 8 | 1 41 52 103 120 141 观光2 夜1 夜18 | 0.852 | 21.497 | Dongcheng |
| Line 1 | ● | ● | ● | Dongdan | 东单 | 5 | 1 41 52 104 106 108 110 111 120 128 140 684 夜1 | 0.774 | 22.271 | Dongcheng |
| Line 1 | ● | ● | ● | Jianguomen | 建国门 | 2 | 1 24 39 44 52 58 120 122 126 139 140 142 200 403 637 638 639 夜1 夜19 夜20 夜24 夜28 夜29 | 1.230 | 23.501 | Dongcheng |
| Line 1 | ● | ● | ● | Yong'anli | 永安里 | | 1 9 28 39 58 120 126 140 403 639 668 夜1 夜24 | 1.377 | 24.878 | Chaoyang |
| Line 1 | ● | ● | ● | Guomao | 国贸 | 10 | 1 9 11 28 57 58 72 98 113 348 368 382 388 402 405 488 561 650 666 667 668 669 687 804 805快 806 807 809 814 817 818 818快 848 930 938快 快速直达专线5 快速直达专线9 快速直达专线20 快速直达专线61 快速直达专线69 快速直达专线169 夜1 夜27 夜30 专10 | 0.790 | 25.668 | Chaoyang |
| Line 1 | ● | ● | ● | Dawang Lu | 大望路 | 14 | 1 11 31 54 57 58 138 382 388 405 486 605 666 667 668 804 812 815 815快 817 818 818快 823 930 973 985 988 快速直达专线5 快速直达专线20 快速直达专线61 夜1 夜25 夜27 夜34 专141 专165 | 1.385 | 27.053 | Chaoyang |
| Line 1 | ● | ● | ● | Sihui | 四惠 | | 1 54 57 58 322 363 397 405 455 468 475 496 506 517 553 605 657 666 671 865 988 989 夜1 夜27 专113 专167 | 1.673 | 28.726 | Chaoyang |
| Line 1 | ● | ● | ● | Sihuidong | 四惠东 | | 363 397 468 475 506 517 553 666 夜27 专141 | 1.714 | 30.440 | Chaoyang |
| Batong line | ● | ● | ● | Gaobeidian | 高碑店 | | 363 397 475 506 517 666 夜27 专141 | 1.375 | 31.815 | Chaoyang |
| Batong line | ● | ● | ● | Communication Univ of China | 传媒大学 | | 397 475 506 666 夜27 专36 专156 | 2.002 | 33.817 | Chaoyang |
| Batong line | ● | ● | ● | Shuang Qiao | 双桥 | | 382 397 411 451 475 506 666 夜27 | 1.894 | 35.711 | Chaoyang |
| Batong line | ● | ● | ● | Guaanzhuang | 管庄 | | 364 388 442 532 615 666 690 BRT2(快速公交2) 夜27 专39 专211 | 1.912 | 37.623 | Chaoyang |
| Batong line | ● | ● | ● | Bali Qiao | 八里桥 | | 322 615 666 668 807 夜27 | 1.763 | 39.386 | Chaoyang |
| Batong line | ● | ● | ● | Tongzhou Beiyuan | 通州北苑 | | 316 317 322 372 591 615 666 667 804 805 806 809 810 811 861 924 938 快速直达专线1 快速直达专线147 快速直达专线174 快速直达专线196 T1 T2 T3 T4 T10 T11 T12 T13 T19 T22 T41 T43 T51 T60 T87 T90 T103 T118 夜27 专157 | 1.700 | 41.086 | Tongzhou |
| Batong line | ● | ● | ● | Guoyuan | 果园 | | 312 316 317 552 591 668 805 938 快速直达专线1 快速直达专线147 快速直达专线166 快速直达专线195 T10 T11 T12 T19 T26 T36 T41 T44 T68 T68区 T87 T103 T118 夜29 | 1.465 | 42.551 | Tongzhou |
| Batong line | ● | | | Jiukeshu | 九棵树 | | 372 582 587 668 805 810 938 快速直达专线1 T5 T7 T9 T10 T13 T14 T17 T21 T22 T25 T26 T40 T41 T43 T44 T45 T62 T64 T65 T68 T71 T72 T73 T87 T90 T101 T102 T103 T113 T117 | 0.990 | 43.541 | Tongzhou |
| Batong line | ● | | | Liyuan | 梨园 | | 342 372 587 589 668 805 806 810 913 938 快速直达专线1 快速直达专线166 T5 T7 T9 T10 T13 T14 T17 T18 T21 T22 T26 T34 T40 T41 T43 T50 T53 T62 T64 T65 T68 T72 T73 T90 T101 T102 T103 T109 | 1.225 | 44.766 | Tongzhou |
| Batong line | ● | | | Linheli | 临河里 | | 435 587 589 591 806 810 924 938 快速直达专线166 T4 T5 T9 T13 T14 T17 T21 T22 T26 T34 T38 T40 T41 T43 T50 T53 T62 T64 T68 T72 T73 T90 T101 T102 T107 T116 T118 专173 专203 | 1.257 | 46.023 | Tongzhou |
| Batong line | ● | | | Tu Qiao | 土桥 | | 435 591 805 806 807 810 910 924 938 快速直达专线166 快速直达专线167 快速直达专线195 T5 T6 T9 T13 T14 T17 T21 T22 T26 T34 T38 T40 T41 T43 T50 T64 T72 T73 T90 T101 T103 T105 T107 T108 T112 T115 T116 T118 | 0.776 | 46.799 | Tongzhou |
| Batong line | ● | | | Huazhuang | 花庄 | 7 | 589 806 T14 T34 T40 T43 T53 T68 T72 T73 T90 T101 T102 T116 | 2.238 | 49.037 | Tongzhou |
| Batong line | ● | | | Universal Resort | 环球度假区 | 7 | 589 T116 | 1.863 | 50.900 | Tongzhou |

== Rolling stock ==
The line uses 6-car Type B rolling stock.

=== Current ===
| Model | Image | Manufacturer | Year built | Year refurbished | Amount in service | Fleet numbers | Depot |
|---|---|---|---|---|---|---|---|
| SFM01 | | CRRC Qingdao Sifang; Beijing Subway Rolling Stock Equipment | 2003 | 2015–2019 | 18 | TQ401–TQ408 (01 071–01 078), TQ415–TQ424 (01 085–01 094) | Tuqiao |
| SFM02 | | CRRC Qingdao Sifang | 2003 | 2018 | 6 | TQ409–TQ414 (01 079–01 084) | Tuqiao |
| SFM07 | | Beijing Subway Rolling Stock Equipment | 2003 | 2019 | 6 | TQ425–TQ430 (01 095–01 100) | Tuqiao |
| BDK06 | | Beijing Subway Rolling Stock Equipment | 2019 | Never | 12 | TQ431–TQ437 (01 101–01 107), 01 108–01 112 | Tuqiao |

=== Former ===
| Model | Image | Manufacturer | Year built | Year Retired | Number Made | Fleet numbers | Depot |
|---|---|---|---|---|---|---|---|
| DK3 | | CRRC Changchun Railway Vehicles | 1971 | 2005 | 14 | TQ101–TQ114 | Tuqiao |
| DK8 | | CRRC Changchun Railway Vehicles | 1986 | 2003 | 4 | TQ115–TQ118 | Tuqiao |

== History ==
=== Phase 1 ===
Construction of the Batong Line began on December 28, 2001, and the line opened on December 27, 2003.

In 2012, traffic on Batong Line was relieved by the opening of the parallel Line 6, with a 12.14% decrease in daily ridership and a 10–20% reduction in flow during rush hour. However, during peak hours sections the line still operates above 100% capacity.

=== Southern extension (Phase 2) ===
There are 2 stations on the southern extension: Huazhuang station and Universal Resort station (both are transfer stations with the eastern extension of Line 7). The extension is 4.5 km in length, including 3.8 km underground section. Huazhuang station was opened on December 28, 2019. Universal Resort station opened on August 26, 2021.

=== Opening timeline ===
| Segment | Commencement | Length | Station(s) | Name |
|---|---|---|---|---|
| Sihui — Tuqiao | 27 December 2003 | 18.964 km (11.8 mi) | 13 | Phase 1 |
| Tuqiao — Huazhuang | 28 December 2019 | 4.5 km (2.8 mi) | 1 | Phase 2 (Southern extension) |
| Huazhuang — Universal Resort | 26 August 2021 | 4.5 km (2.8 mi) | 1 | Phase 2 (Southern extension) |

=== Through operations with Line 1 ===
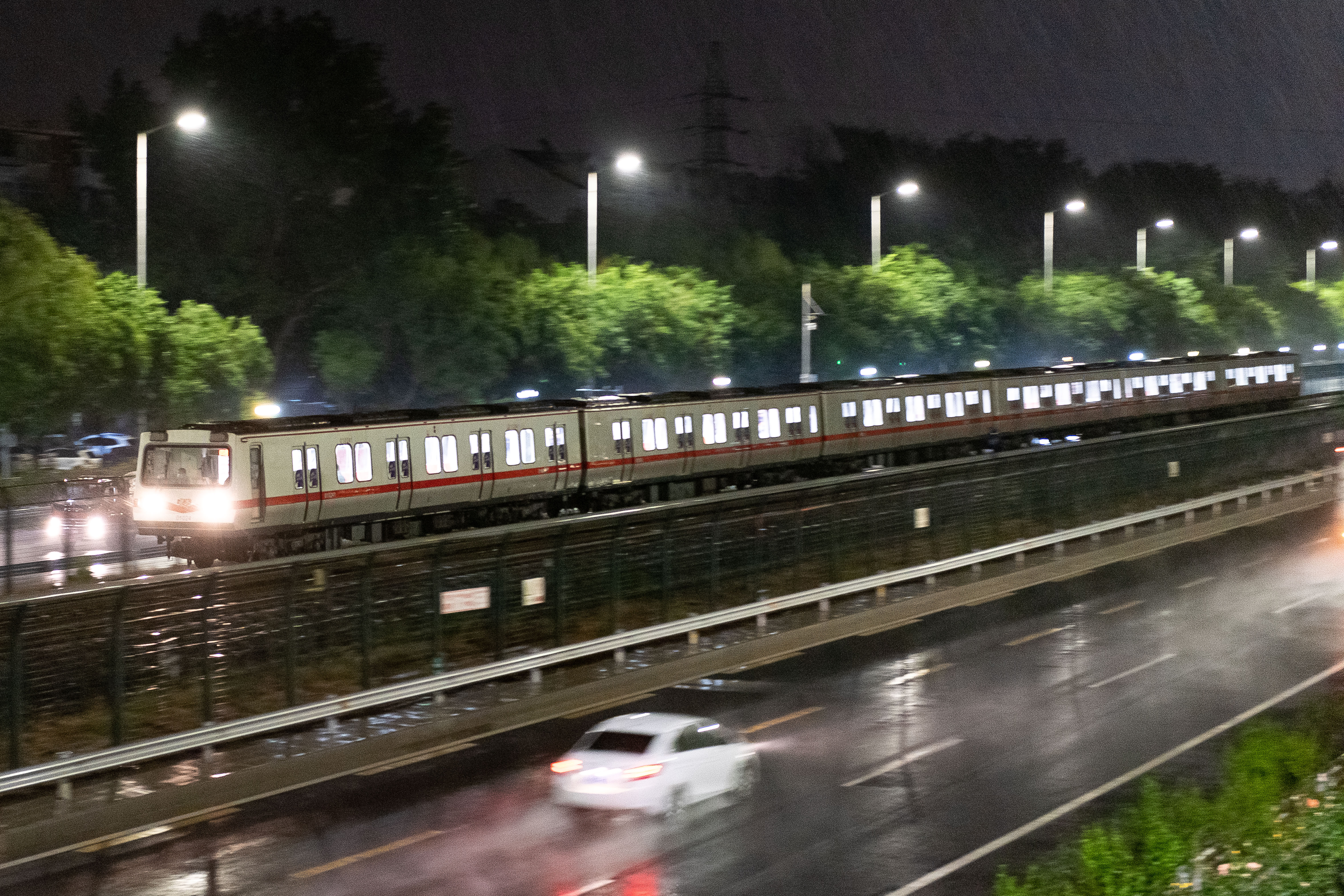
A DKZ4 train of Line 1 near Communication Univ. of China station during the stress testing on 23 May 2021

In 2010, a CPPCC member Chen Dingwang, proposed that services on Line 1 and the Batong Line should directly link, with through operations, reducing travel times and removing the unnecessary forced transfers at Sihuidong or Sihui. However, the Beijing Subway responded that Line 1's and Batong's signal systems are completely different, so through-operation will be more difficult to achieve from an engineering standpoint. As of 2016, preliminary design and feasibility studies are underway to allow for through operations between Line 1 and Batong. On June 12, 2020, the project of the through operation of Line 1 and Batong line was approved by Beijing Development and Reform Commission. Through operation with Line 1 started on 29 August 2021.
