= Communication Univ of China station =

Beijing Subway station

Coordinates: 39.9092°N 116.555°E

Communication Univ. of China 传媒大学
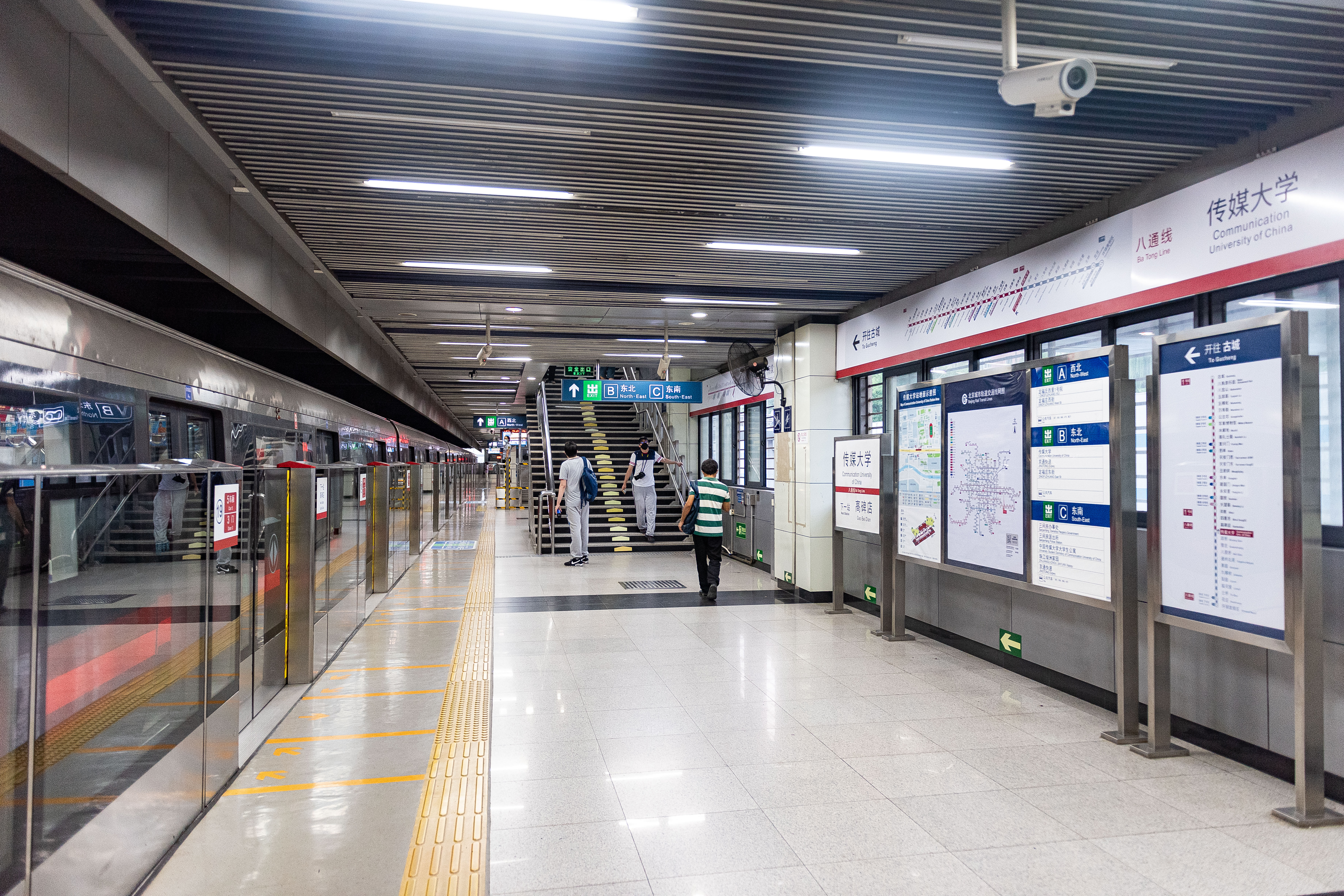
- Westbound platform after the through operation to Line 1 in 2021

General information
- Other names: Dingfuzhuang station (initial plan), Broadcasting Institute station (2003–2007)
- Location: Chaoyang District, Beijing; China
- Operator: Beijing Mass Transit Railway Operation Corporation Limited
- Line: Batong line
- Platforms: 2 (2 side platforms)
- Tracks: 2

Construction
- Structure type: At-grade
- Accessible: Yes

Other information
- Station code: BT04

History
- Opened: December 27, 2003; 22 years ago

Services
Preceding station	Beijing Subway	Following station
Gaobeidian towards Gucheng	Batong line	Shuang Qiao towards Universal Resort
Location
- Location within Beijing

Communication Univ. of China station (Chinese: 传媒大学站; pinyin: Chuánméi Dàxué zhàn) is a station on the Batong line of the Beijing Subway. It is named after the Communication University of China near the station.

== Station layout ==
The station has 2 at-grade side platforms.

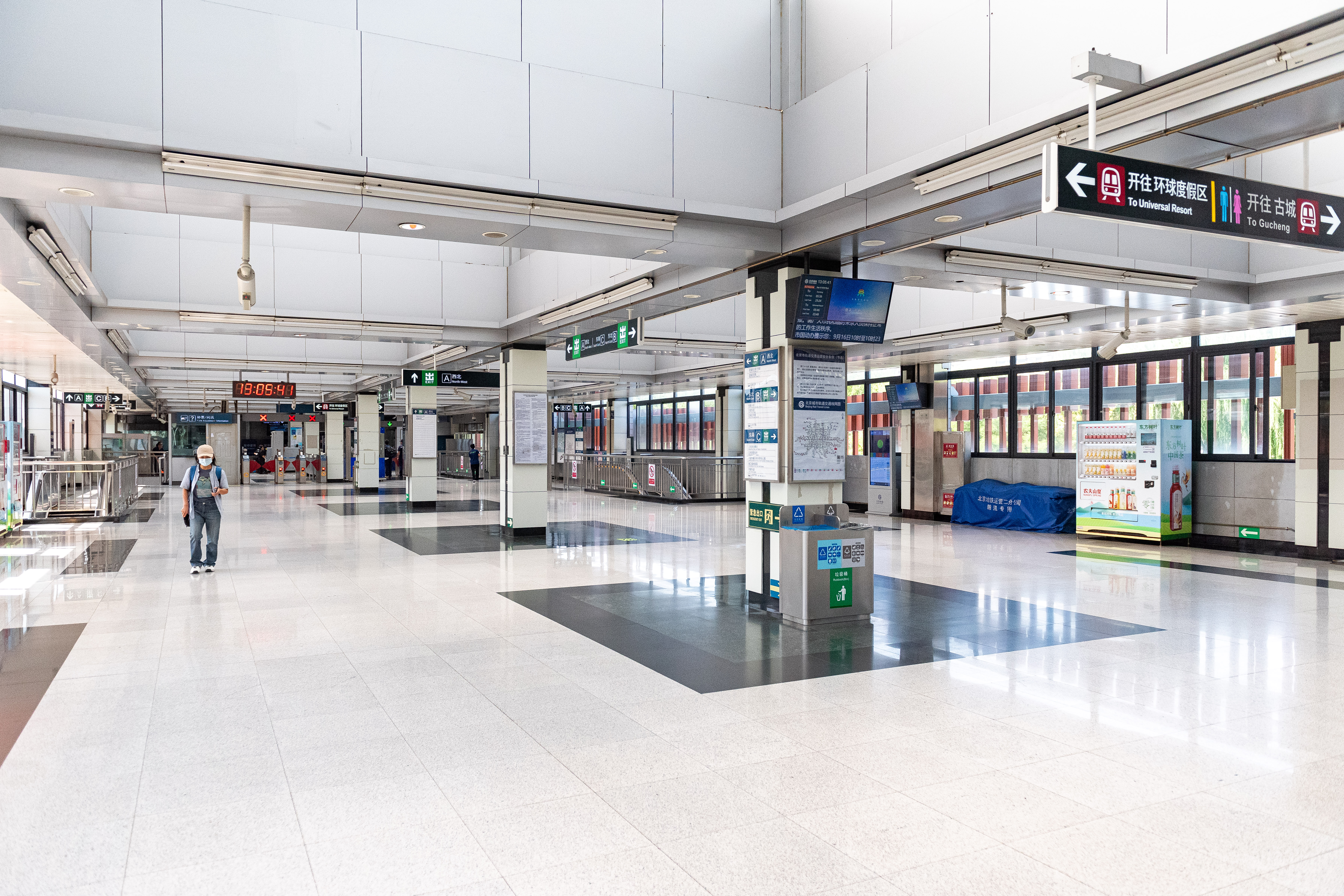
Concourse

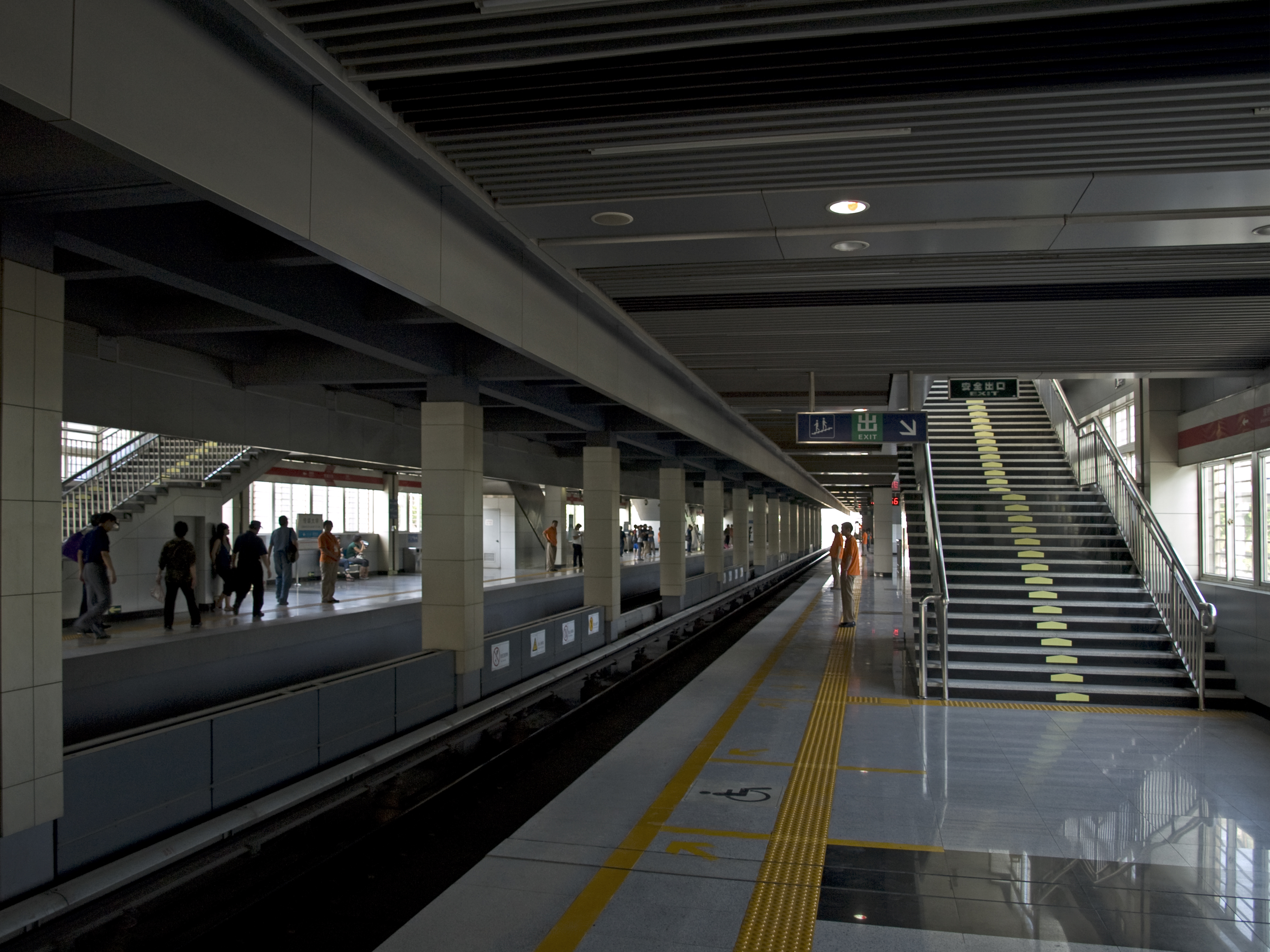
Platform before the installation of platform gates in 2010

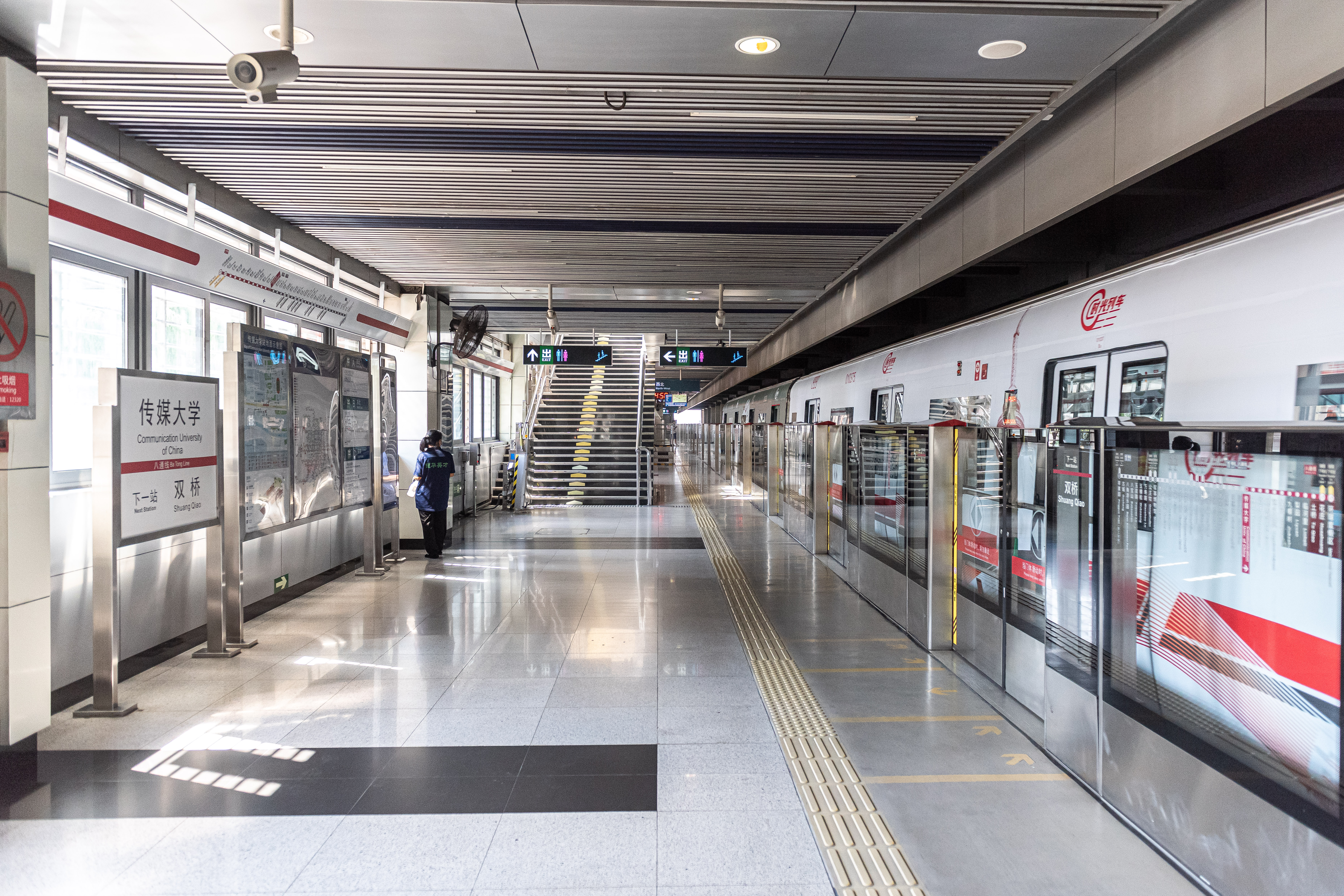
Eastbound platform in 2023

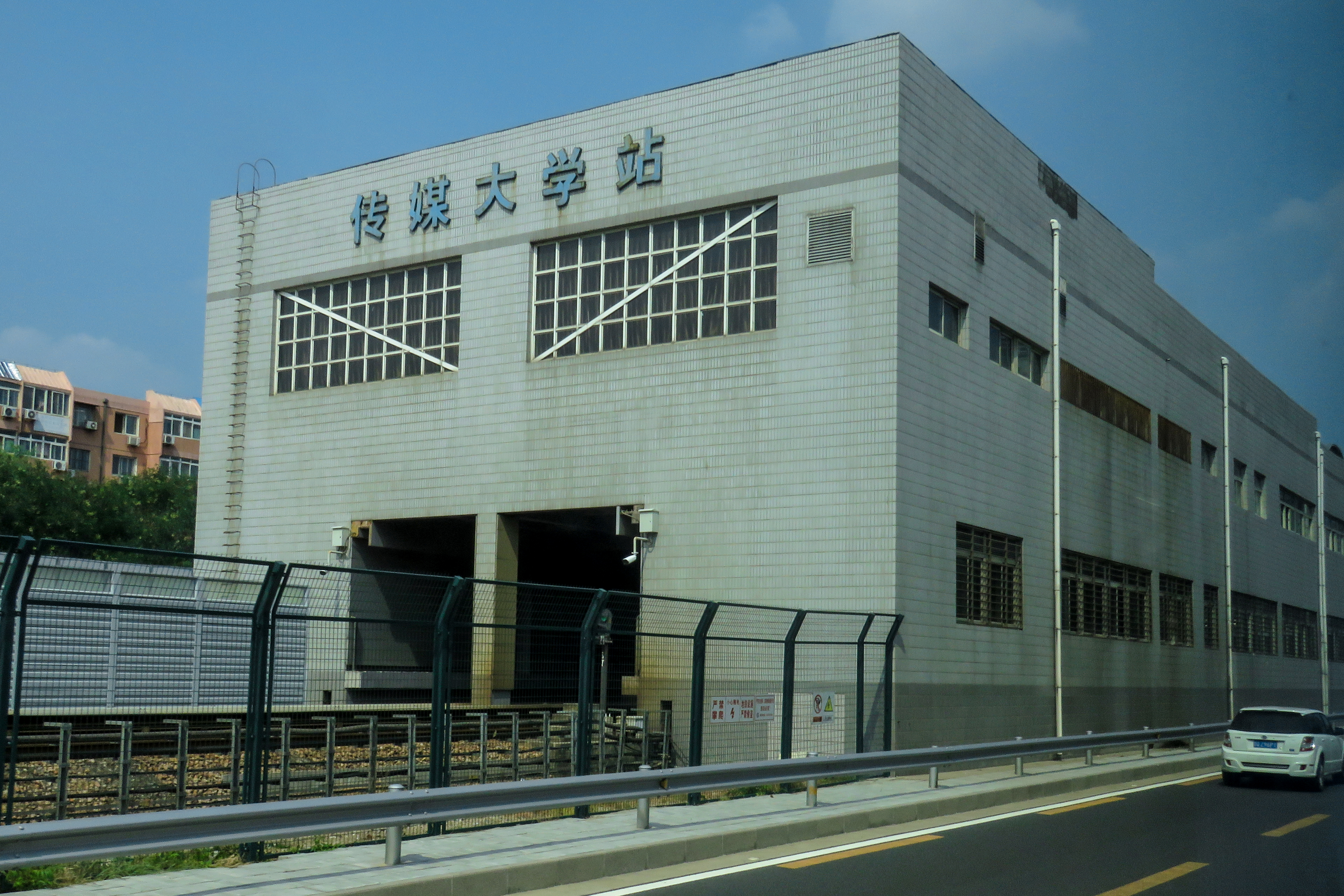
Facade before renovation in 2018

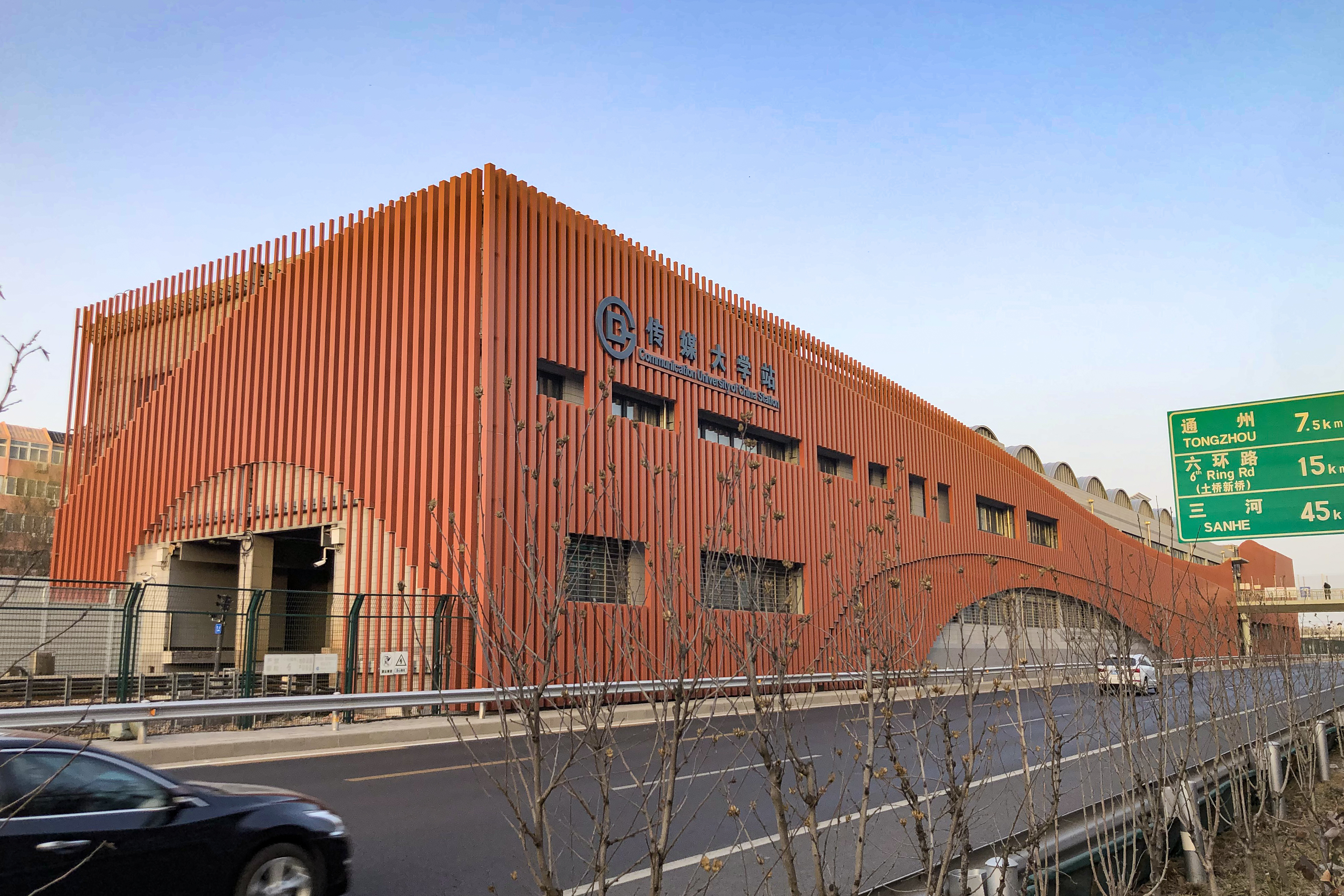
Facade after renovation in 2021

== Exits ==
There are 3 exits, lettered A, B, and C. Exits B and C are accessible.
