= Gaobeidian station =

Beijing Subway station

Coordinates: 39.909448°N 116.531421°E

Gaobeidian 高碑店
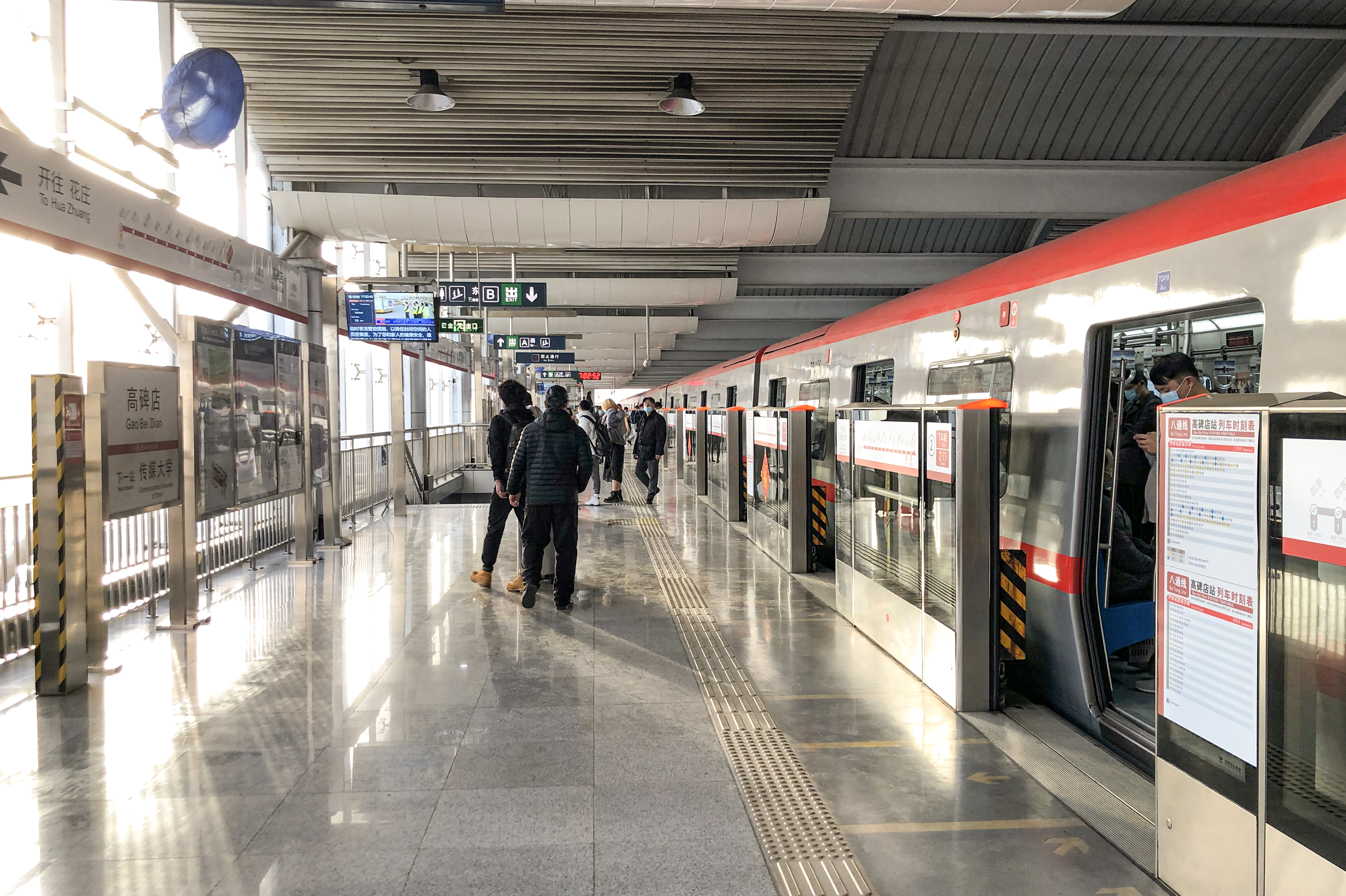
- Eastbound platform

General information
- Location: Gaobeidian, Chaoyang District, Beijing; China
- Operator: Beijing Mass Transit Railway Operation Corporation Limited
- Line: Batong line
- Platforms: 2 (2 side platforms)
- Tracks: 2

Construction
- Structure type: Elevated
- Accessible: Yes

History
- Opened: December 27, 2003; 22 years ago

Services
Preceding station	Beijing Subway	Following station
Sihui Dong (E) (Line 1) towards Gucheng	Batong line	Communication University of China towards Universal Resort
Location
- Location within Beijing

Gaobeidian Station (Chinese: 高碑店站; pinyin: Gāobēidiàn Zhàn) is a station on the Batong line of the Beijing Subway. It is located in the Gaobeidian area of Chaoyang District. There are entry points on either side of the Gaobeidian Bridge.

== Station layout ==
The station has 2 elevated side platforms.

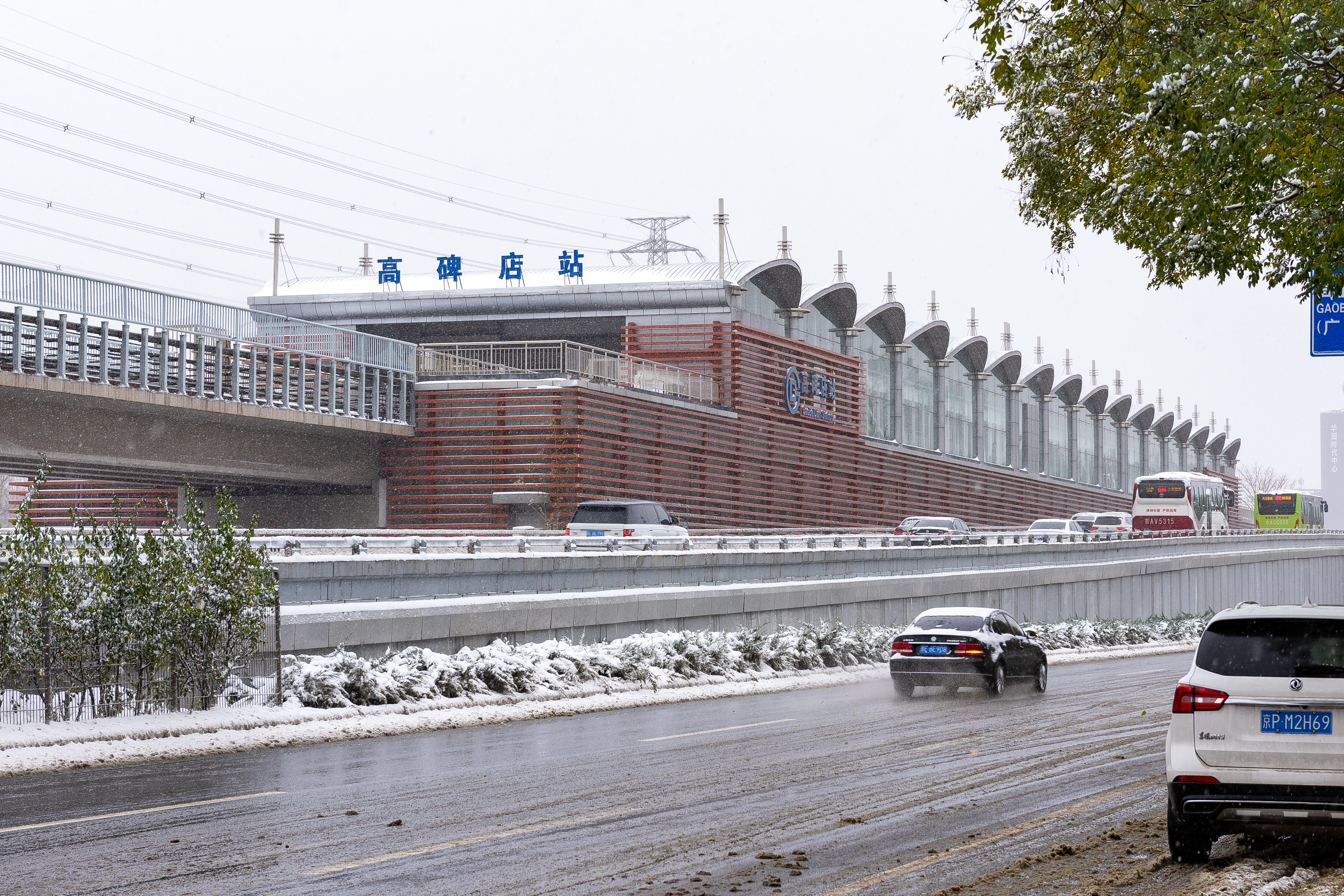
Exterior after renovation

== Exits ==
There are 6 exits, lettered A1, A2, A3, A4, B1, and B2. Exits B1 and B2 are accessible.
