= Tongzhou Beiyuan station =

Beijing Subway station

Tongzhou Beiyuan 通州北苑
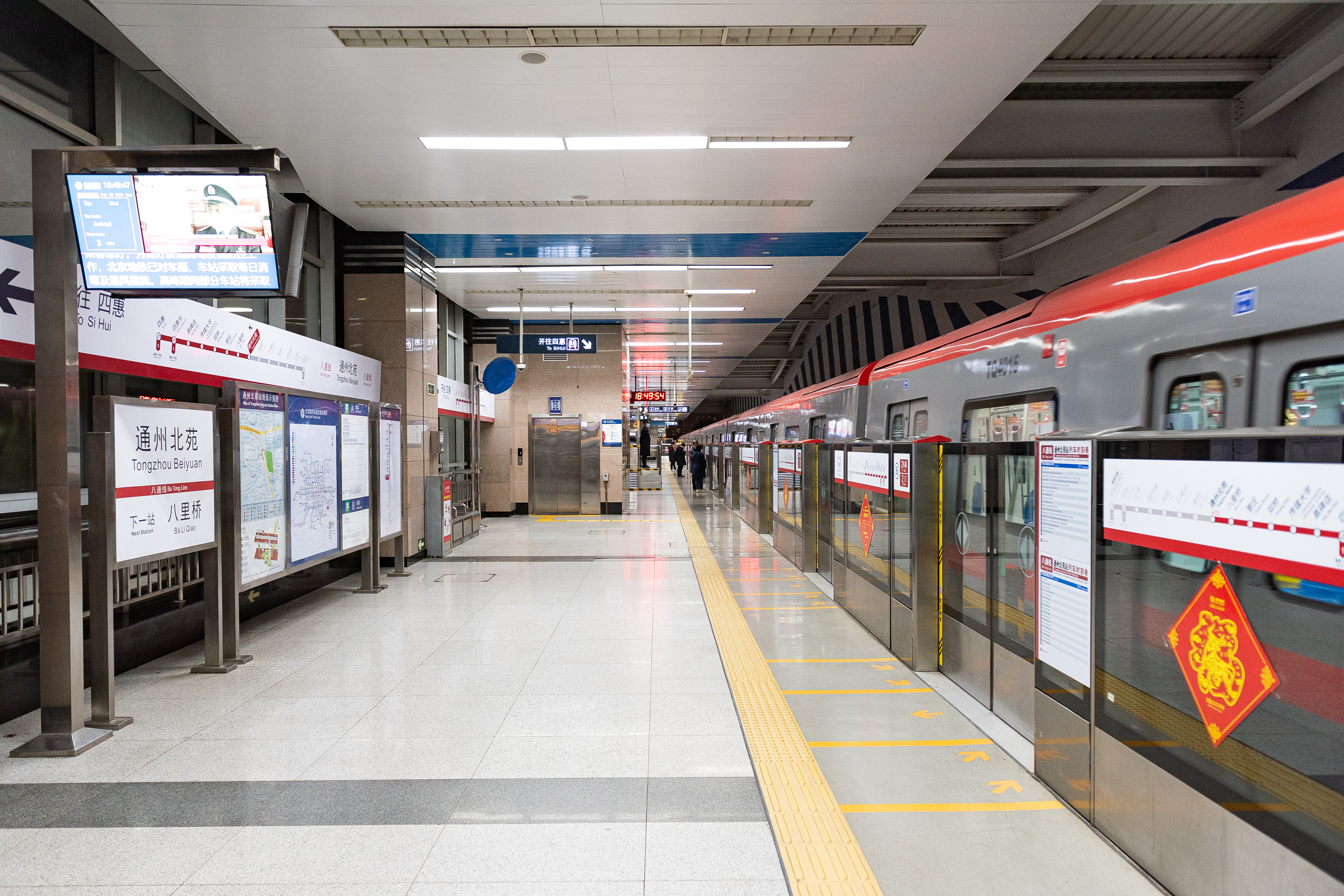
- Platform

General information
- Location: Beiyuan Subdistrict, Tongzhou District, Beijing; China
- Coordinates: 39.903864°N 116.637252°E
- Operator: Beijing Mass Transit Railway Operation Corporation Limited
- Line: Batong line
- Platforms: 2 (2 side platforms)
- Tracks: 2

Construction
- Structure type: Elevated
- Accessible: Yes

Other information
- Station code: BT08

History
- Opened: December 27, 2003; 22 years ago

Services
Preceding station	Beijing Subway	Following station
Baliqiao towards Gucheng	Batong line	Guoyuan towards Universal Resort
Location
- Location within Beijing

Tongzhou Beiyuan Station (Chinese: 通州北苑站; pinyin: Tōngzhōu Běiyuàn Zhàn) is a station on the Batong line of the Beijing Subway.

== Station layout ==
The station has 2 elevated side platforms.

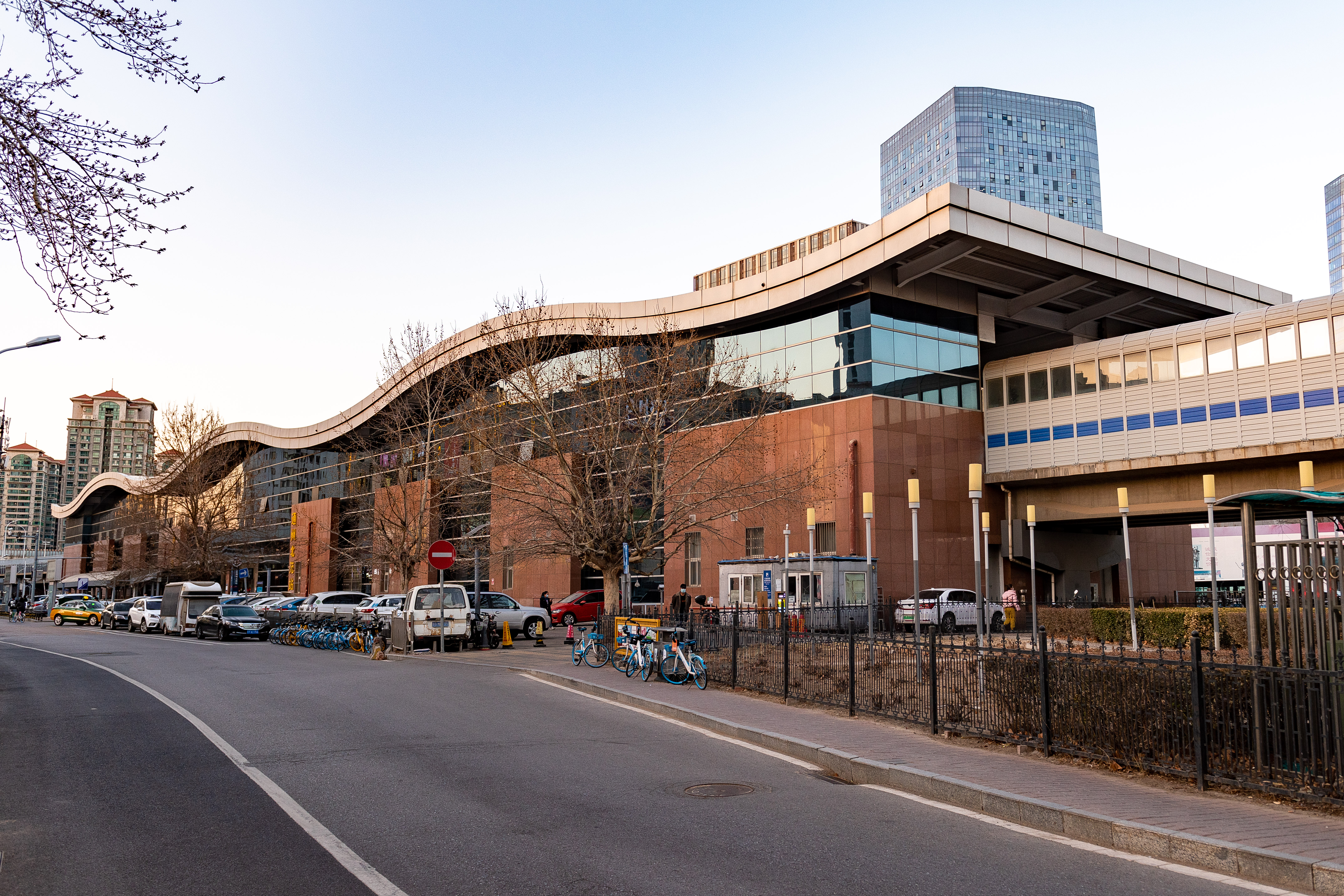
View of the station from outside

== Exits ==
There are 2 exits, lettered A and B. Exit B is accessible.
