= Sihui, Beijing =

Coordinates: 39.9082°N 116.4932°E

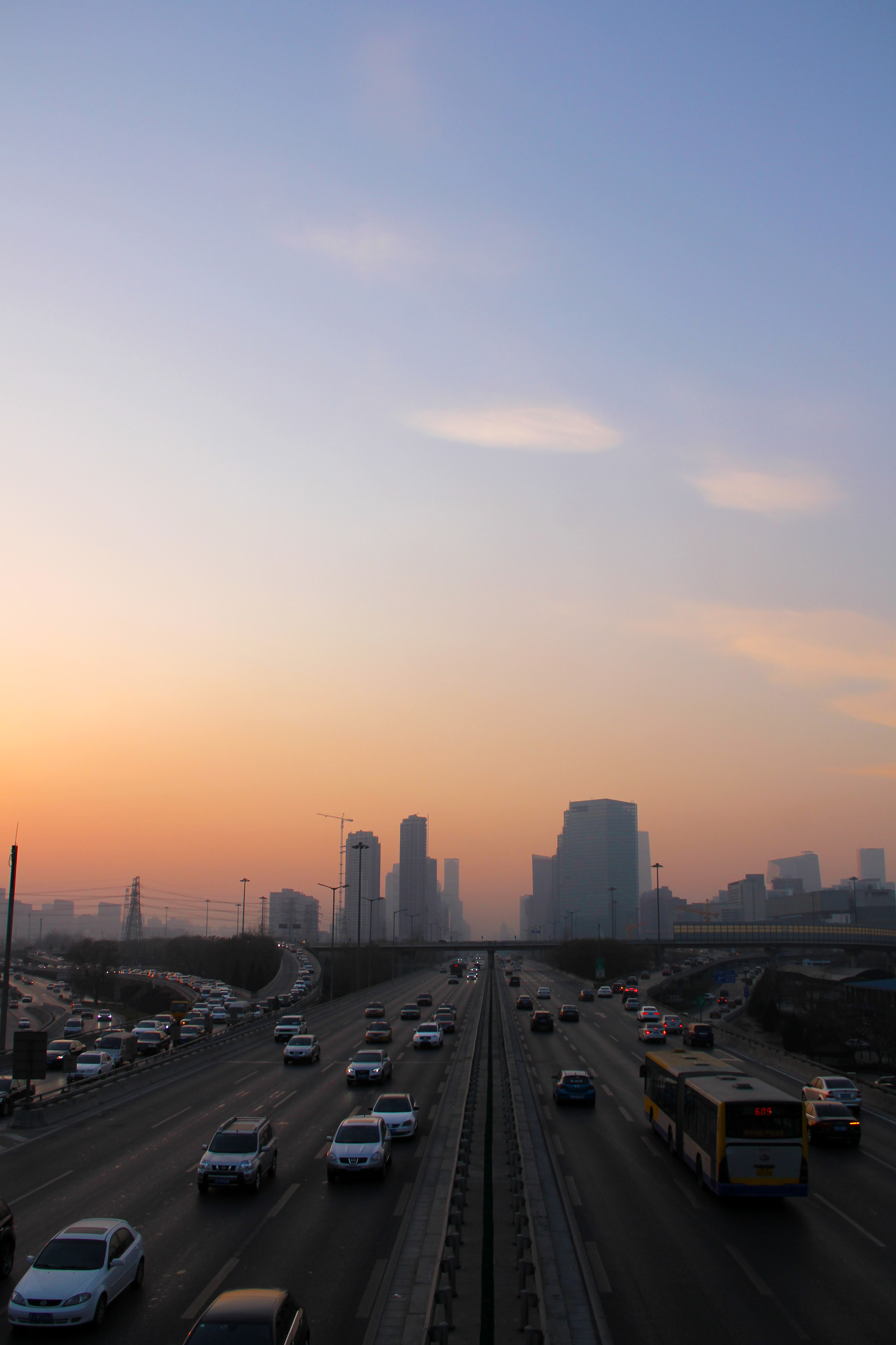
A view of Beijing central business district from Sihui

Sihui (Chinese: 四惠; pinyin: Sìhuì) is a transportation node in Beijing. It forms the intersection between the eastern 4th Ring Road and the Jingtong Expressway.

Sihui Station and Sihui East Station are stops for both Line 1 and the Batong Line of the Beijing Subway. Line 1 ends at Sihui East, while the Batong Line begins at Sihui.

An overpass linking the two express roads is in the region and is named Sihui Bridge after the region. The bridge has some portions which are incomplete and are apparently for future expansion.

An initial design plan for the Sihui Transportation Hub underwent review in September 2010. It was finished in October 2012.
