= Sihui station =

Beijing Subway interchange station

Sihui 四惠
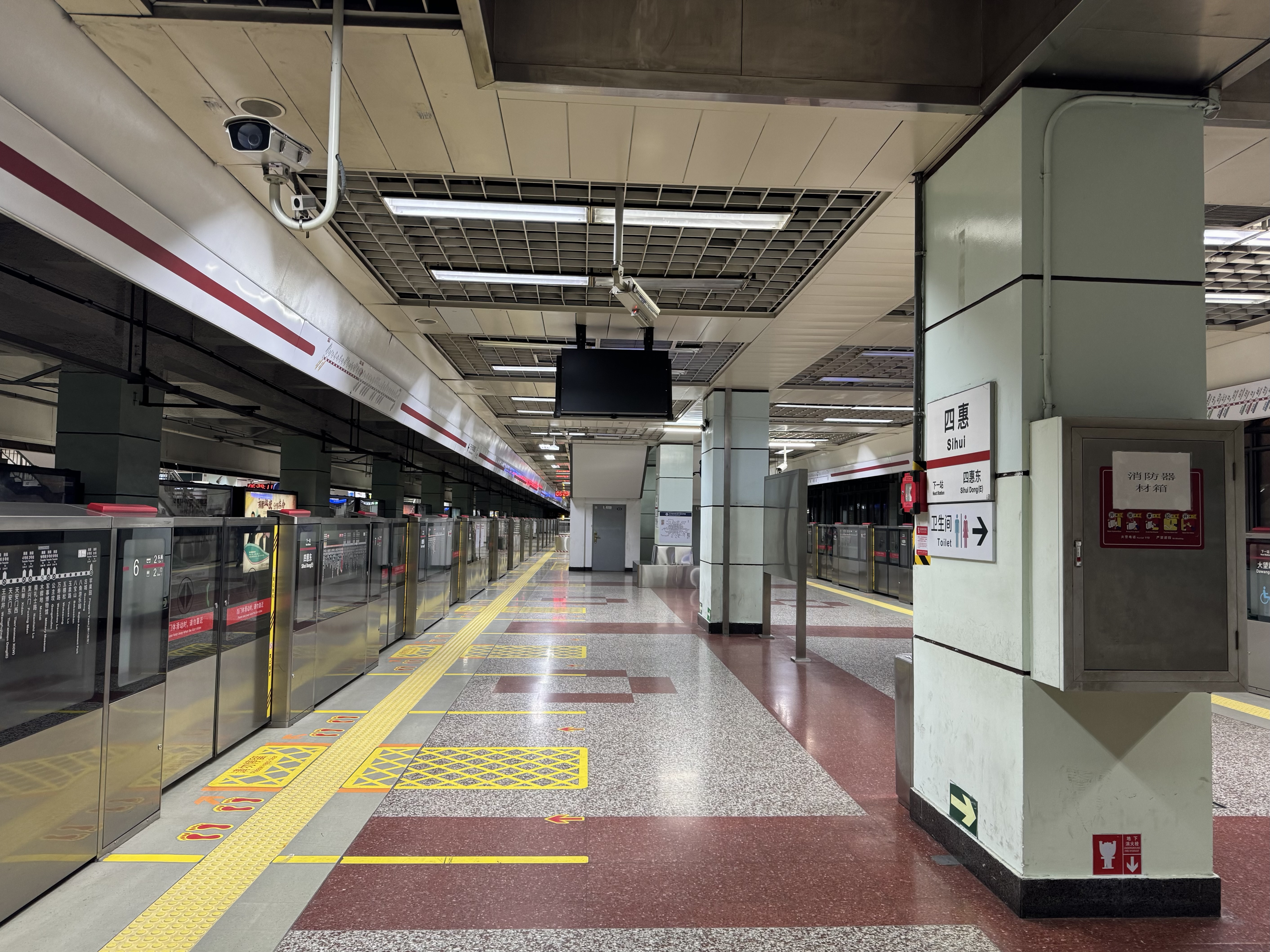
- Line 1 platform

General information
- Location: Sihui, Chaoyang District, Beijing; China
- Coordinates: 39.9088°N 116.4955°E
- Operator: Beijing Mass Transit Railway Operation Corporation Limited
- Line: Line 1
- Platforms: 4 (2 island platforms) (1 island platform in use)
- Tracks: 4 (2 in use)

Construction
- Structure type: At-grade
- Accessible: Yes

History
- Opened: September 28, 1999; 26 years ago (Line 1); December 27, 2003; 22 years ago (Batong line)
- Closed: August 29, 2021; 4 years ago (former Batong line platform)
- Former names: Bawangfen

Services
Preceding station	Beijing Subway	Following station
Dawang Lu towards Pingguoyuan	Line 1 (through operation to Batong Line)	Sihui Dong (E) towards Universal Resort
Location
- Location within Beijing

Sihui Station (Chinese: 四惠站; pinyin: Sì Huì Zhàn) is a station on Line 1 and the Batong line of the Beijing Subway. It is located in Sihui, Chaoyang District, Beijing.

This station was once called Bawangfen during planning.

== Station layout ==
The line 1 and Batong line have island platforms that are on street level, parallel to each other. From August 29, 2021, only the Line 1 platform is used.

== Exits ==
There are two exits, lettered A and B. Exit A is accessible.

== Gallery ==
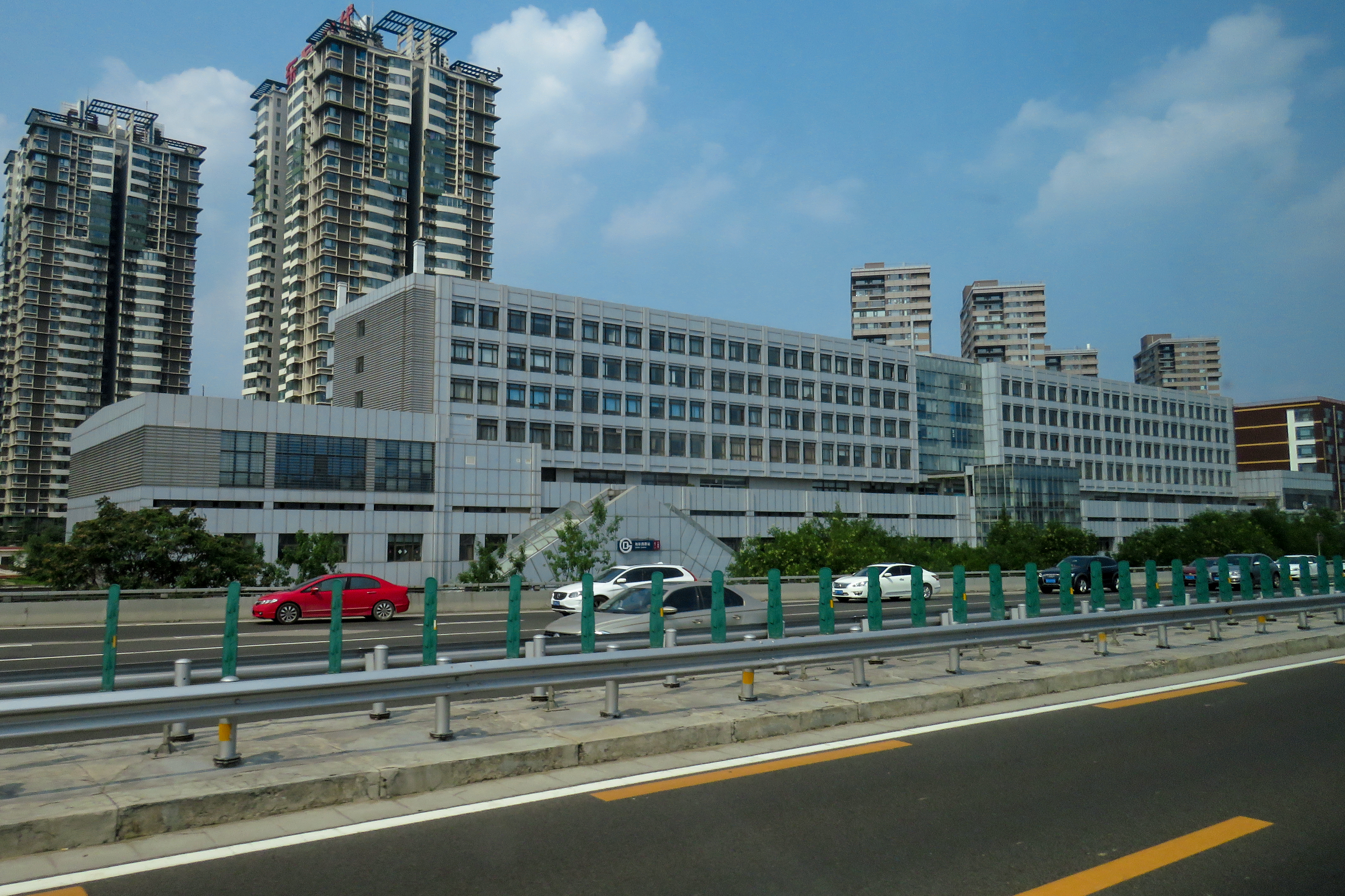
Station exterior

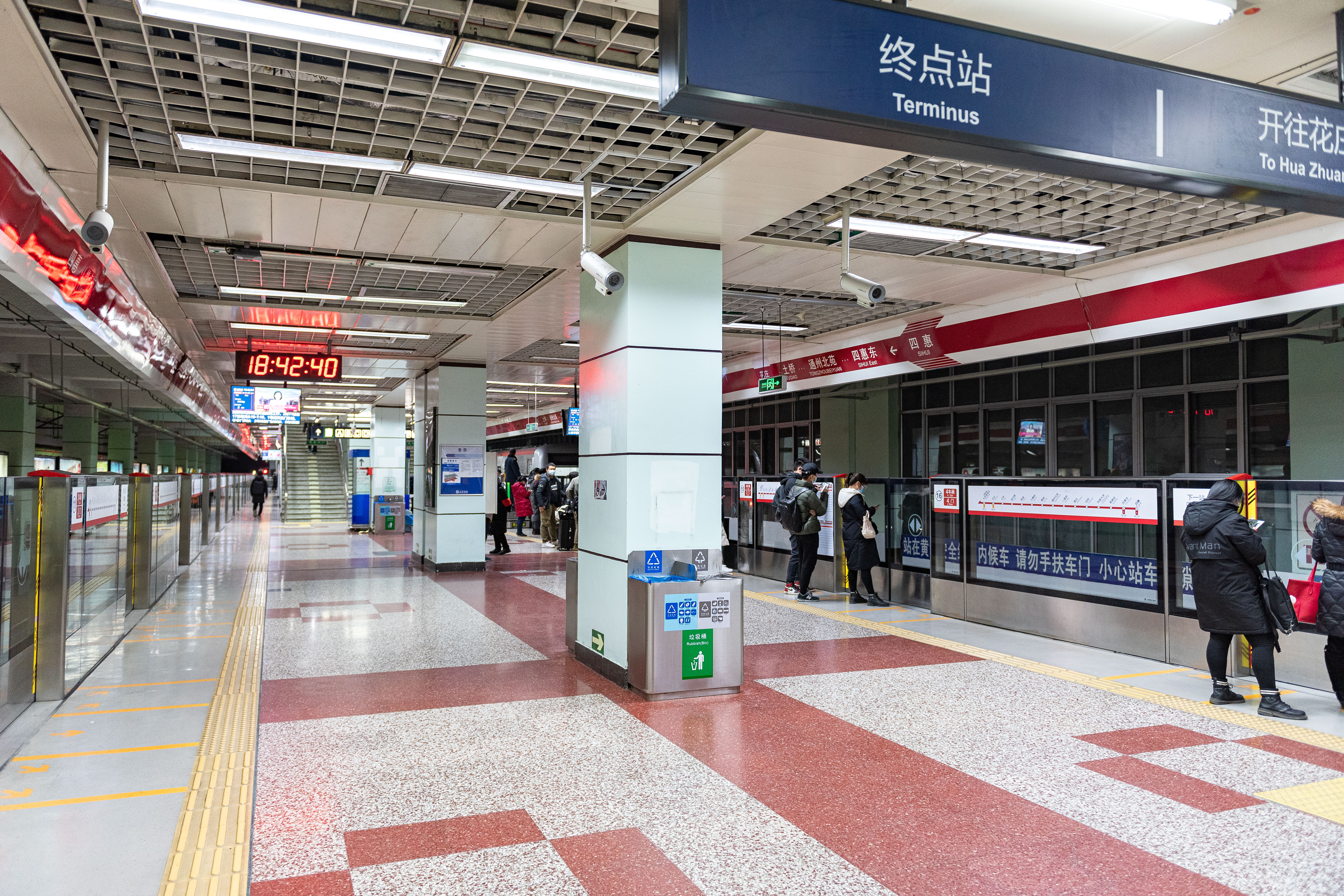
Batong line platform

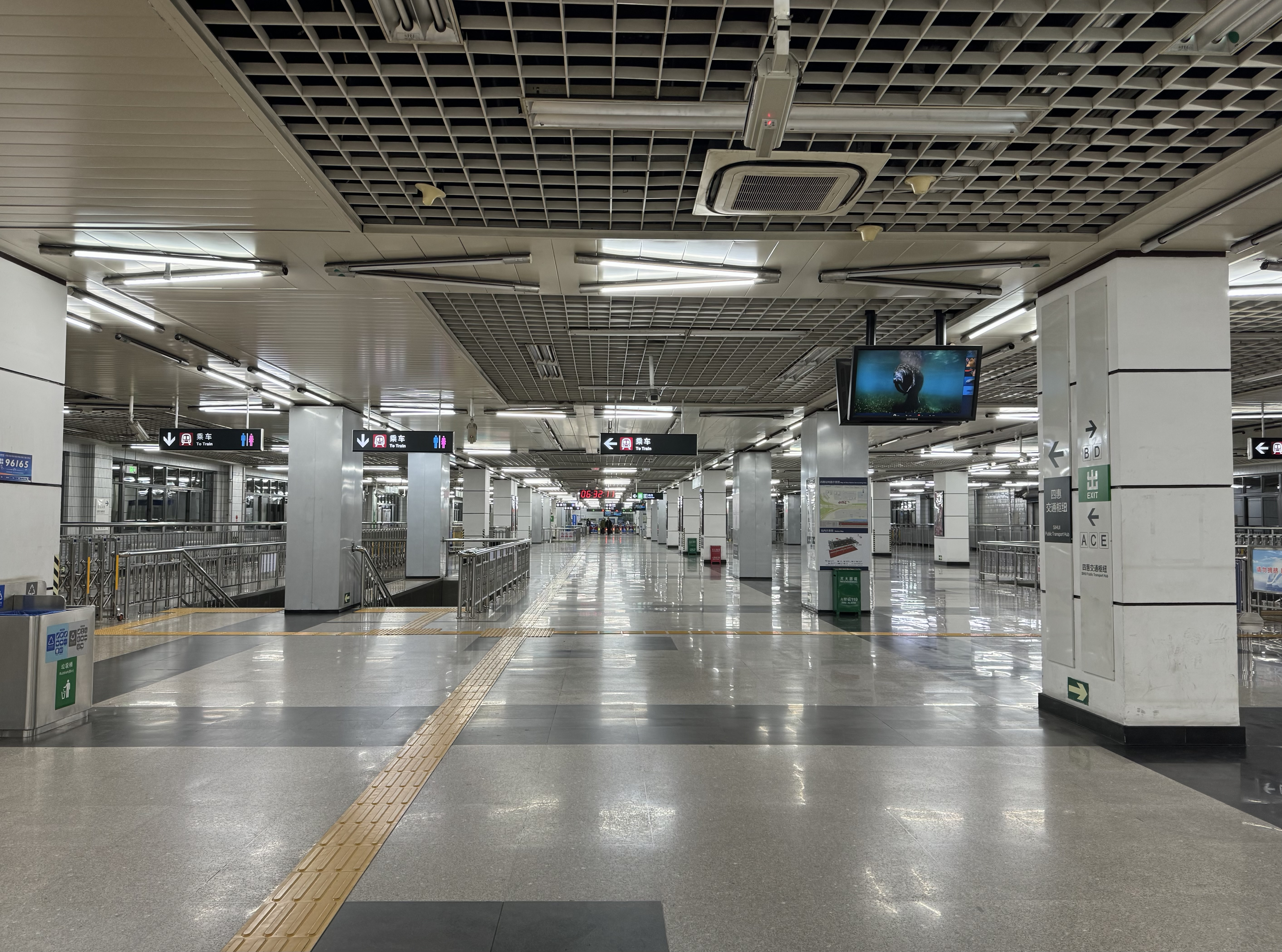
Concourse
