= Beijing Subway restricted stations =

Beijing Subway stations not open to public

Beyond Pingguoyuan, the terminus that is accessible to the public, there are two other stations on Line 1, Beijing Subway.

Station 53 is located under a military base, therefore rendering it inaccessible to the public.

Fushouling station is under renovation.

== Fushouling station ==
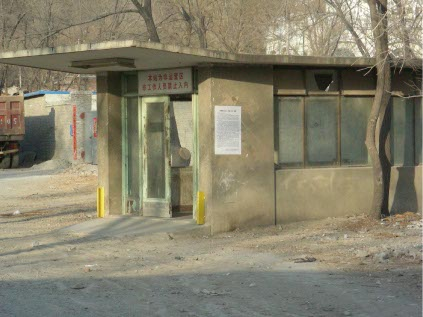
Entrance of Fushouling station.

Fushouling station (simplified Chinese: 福寿岭站; traditional Chinese: 福壽嶺站; pinyin: Fúshòulǐng Zhàn), previously known as Station 52, is currently under renovation. It is the second last station of Line 1, Beijing Subway. However, its location is actually outside of the military zone, and thus it was decided to open the station to the public. On 25 November 2021, the station began renovation, and it is expected that the station will open in 2023. The station will also serve the nearby Beijing Banking & Insurance Business Park (北京银行保险产业园).

39.938272°N 116.164647°E

== Station 53 (Gaojing station, No. 101) ==
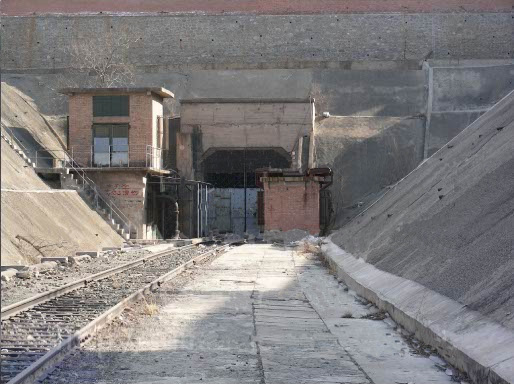
Tunnel portal to Station 53 (Gaojing station).

Station 53, also known as Gaojing (高井站; Gāojǐng Zhàn) by Shijingshan District Government, is located under a military base. There are two side platforms with space for two tracks, one of which (facing Sihuidong) has been left unbuilt.

39.948242°N 116.142325°E

== Connection to Sanjiadian railway station ==
After Station 53, there is a spur to the Sanjiadian railway station in Mentougou District, also located in Beijing's Western Hills.

== See also ==
- Line 1, Beijing Subway
- Beijing Subway
- List of Beijing Subway stations
- Rail transport in the People's Republic of China
- Ghost station
