= Tian'anmenxi station =

Beijing Subway station

Coordinates: 39°54′27″N 116°23′29″E

Tian'anmenxi 天安门西
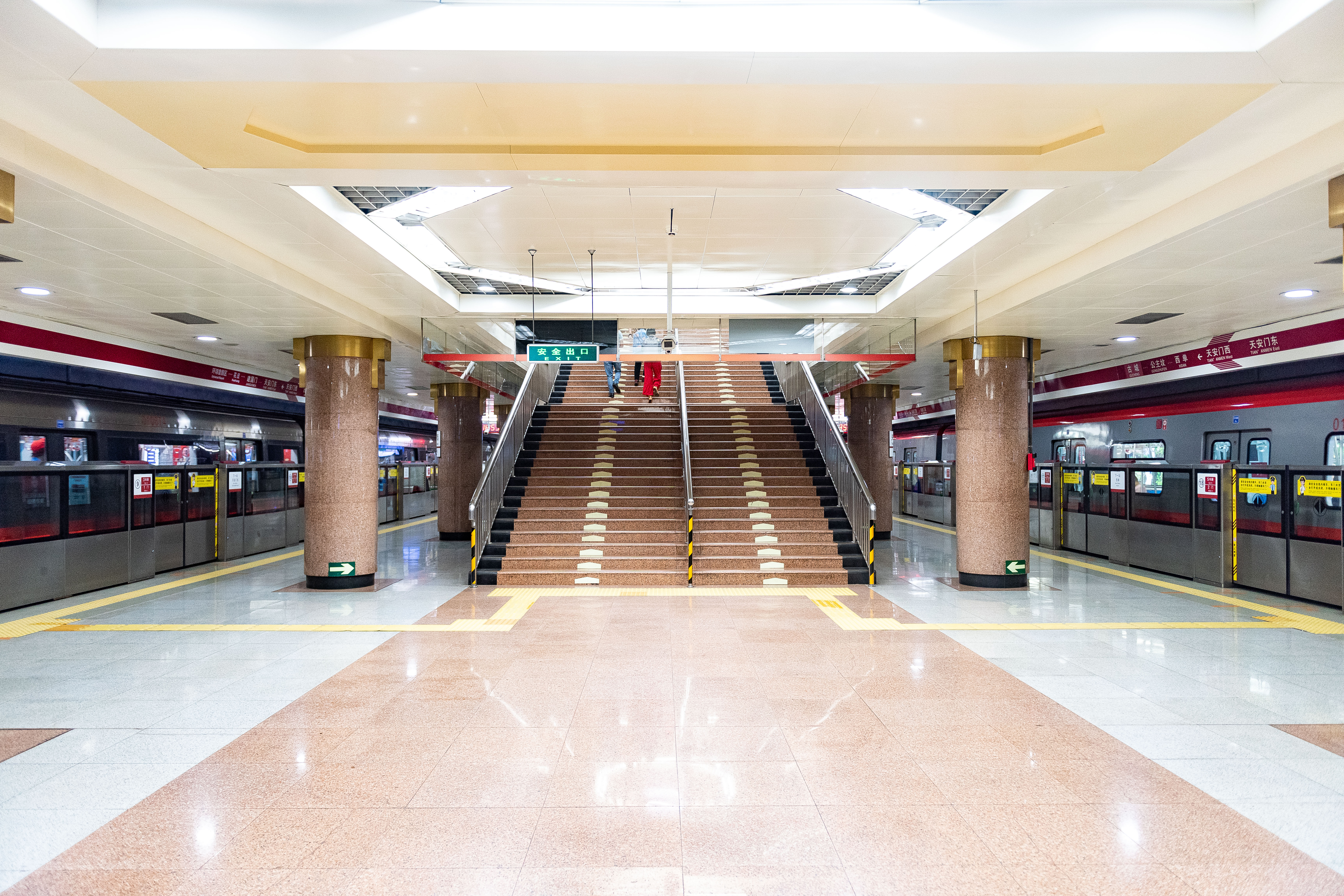
- Platform

General information
- Location: West Chang'an Avenue; Xicheng District, Beijing; China
- Operator: Beijing Mass Transit Railway Operation Corporation Limited
- Line: Line 1
- Platforms: 2 (1 island platform)
- Tracks: 2

Construction
- Structure type: Underground
- Accessible: Yes

Other information
- Station code: 116

History
- Opened: September 28, 1999

Services
| Preceding station | Beijing Subway | Following station |
|---|---|---|
| Xidan towards Pingguoyuan | Line 1 | Tian'anmendong towards Universal Resort |
Location
- Location within Beijing

Tian'anmenxi Station (天安门西站) is a station on Line 1 of the Beijing Subway. It is located near Tiananmen Square, the Forbidden City, and the National Centre for the Performing Arts.

== Station layout ==
The station has an underground island platform.

== Exits ==
There are three exits, numbered A, B, and C. Exits A and C are accessible.
