= Wangfujing station =

Metro station in Beijing, China

Wangfujing 王府井
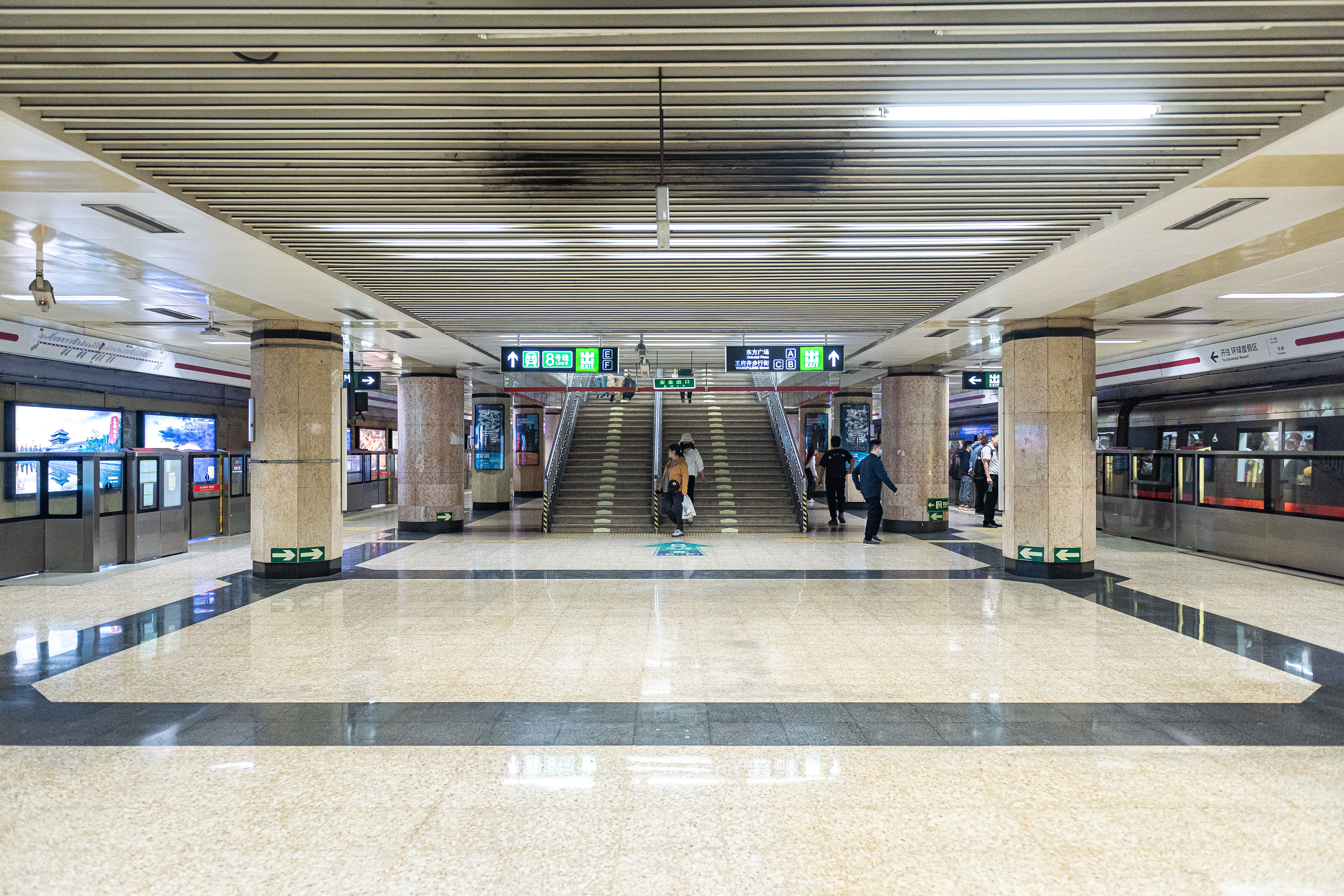
- Line 1 platform

General information
- Location: East Chang'an Avenue and Wangfujing Street; Dongcheng District, Beijing; China
- Operator: Beijing Mass Transit Railway Operation Corporation Limited
- Platforms: 4 (2 island platforms)
- Tracks: 4

Construction
- Structure type: Underground
- Accessible: Yes

Other information
- Station code: 118 (Line 1)

History
- Opened: September 28, 1999 (Line 1); December 31, 2021 (Line 8)

Services
Preceding station	Beijing Subway	Following station
Tian'anmendong towards Pingguoyuan	Line 1	Dongdan towards Universal Resort
Jinyu Hutong towards Zhuxinzhuang	Line 8	Qian Men towards Yinghai
Location
- Location within Beijing

Wangfujing station (Chinese: 王府井站; pinyin: Wángfǔjǐng zhàn) is a station located in Dongcheng District, Beijing. It is the transfer station of Line 1 and Line 8. The Line 1 station is decorated with the color yellow.

== Location ==
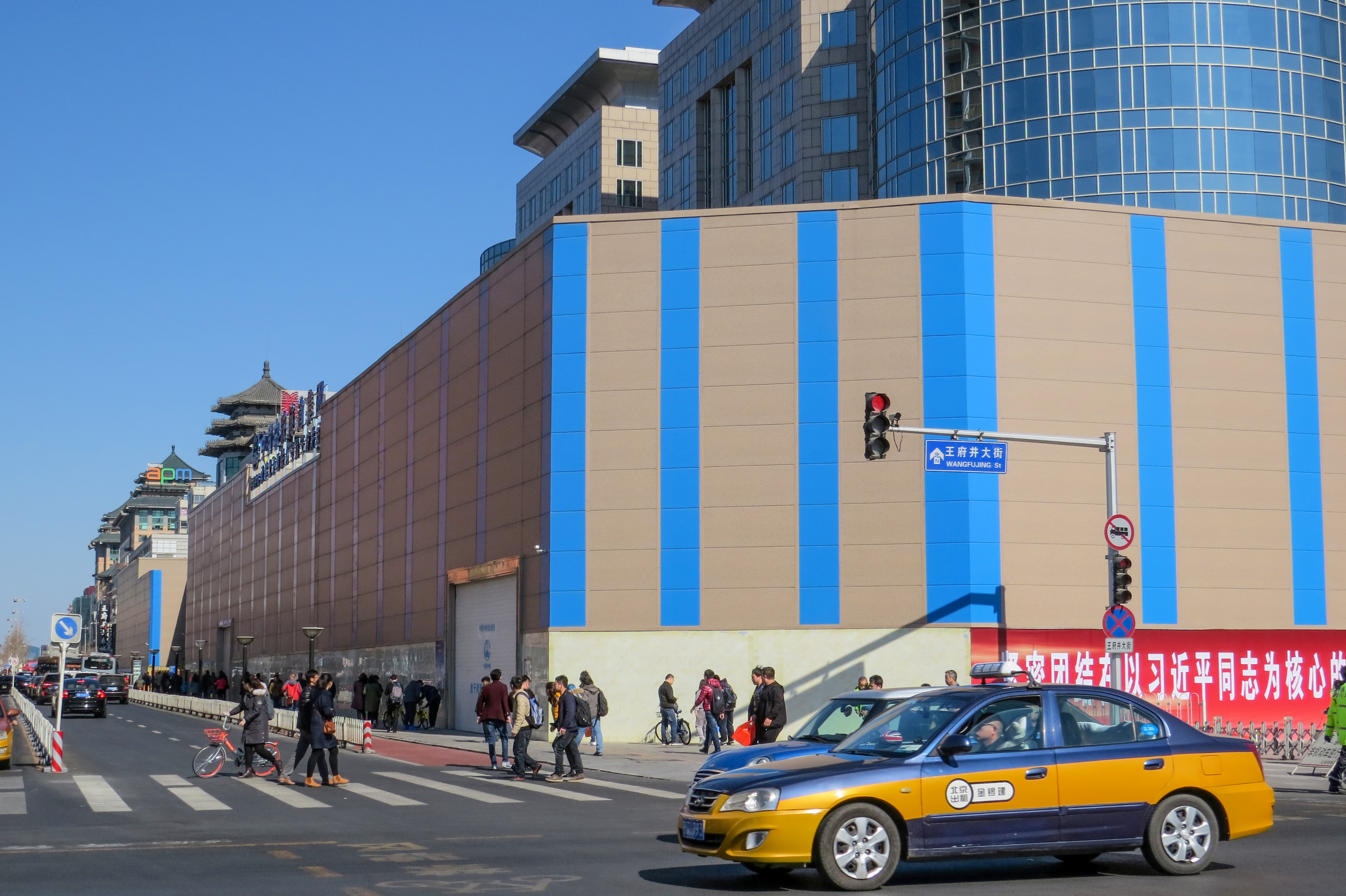
Line 8 station construction site at the northeast corner of Wangfujing intersection (February 2017)

This station is located at the intersection of Wangfujing Street and Chang'an Avenue. Wangfujing Ancient Human Culture Site Museum is at Exit A.

== Structure ==
=== Station hall and transfer ===
The station hall of Wangfujing Station of Line 1 is located under East Chang'an Avenue, passing through two underground passages that cross East Chang'an Avenue. The station hall of Line 8 is located in the underground on the north side of the intersection of Wangfujing Street and East Chang'an Street, there are two transfers on the south side The passage entrance and the mural "Wangfu Ancient Charm", the station hall of Line 8 is connected to the station hall of Line 1 on the upper floor through the stairs and escalators in the transfer passage, and there is another straight elevator leading to the station hall of Line 1 in the southwest corner. From the station hall to the platform on the southernmost side of the escalator brow wall is the mural "Century Time-honored Brand", and on the northernmost escalator brow wall is "Wangfujing Xinjie Shidaixing".

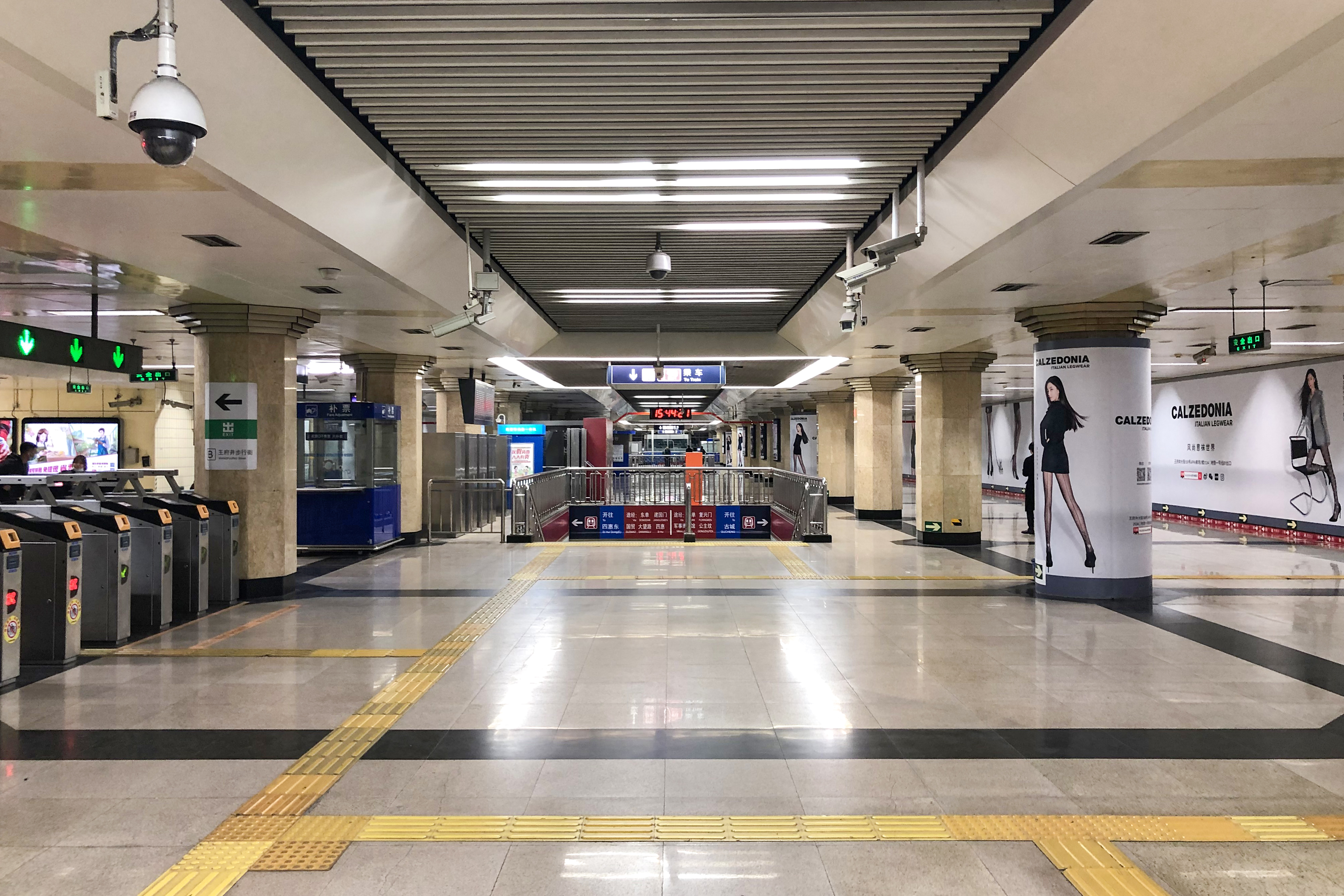
Line 1 Station Hall (November 2020)

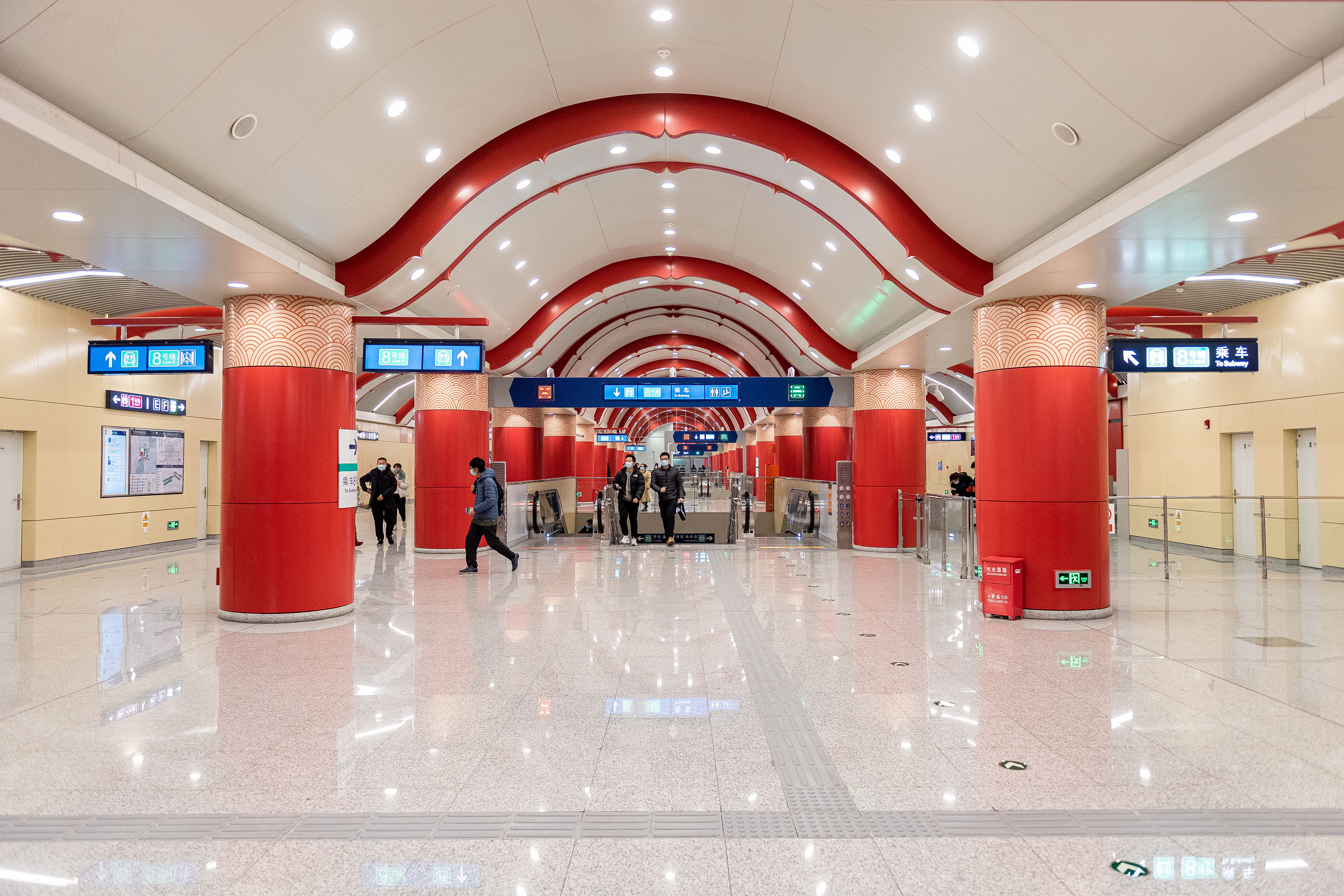
Line 8 Station Hall (January 2022)

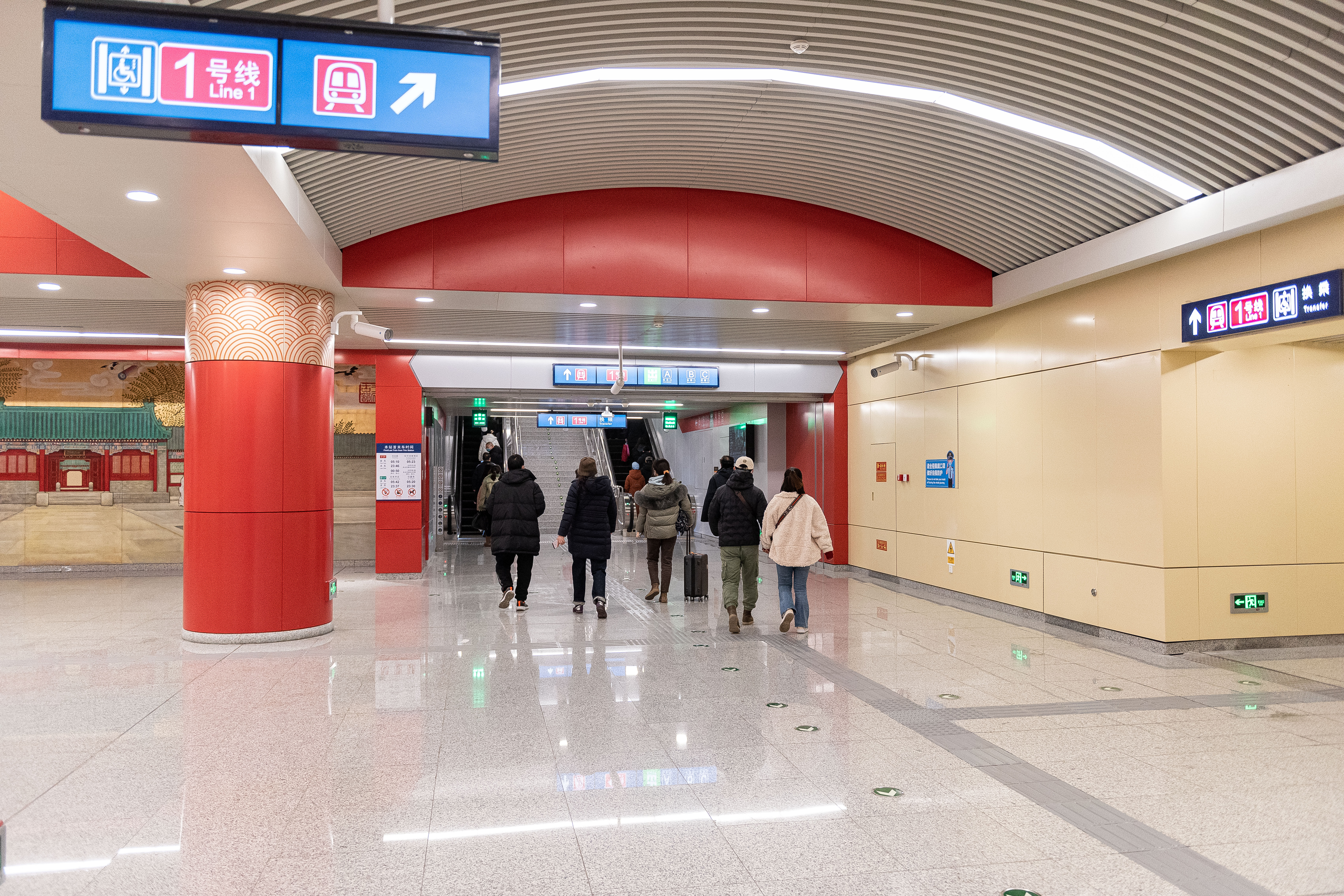
Interchange between Line 8 and Line 1 (January 2022)

=== Platform ===
Line 1

The platform of Wangfujing station of Line 1 is located at the bottom of East Chang'an Avenue. It is an island-style platform. At present, Half-Height Platform Screen Doors has been installed (since July 23, 2017).

Line 8

Line 8 has an island-style platform at the bottom of Wangfujing Street.

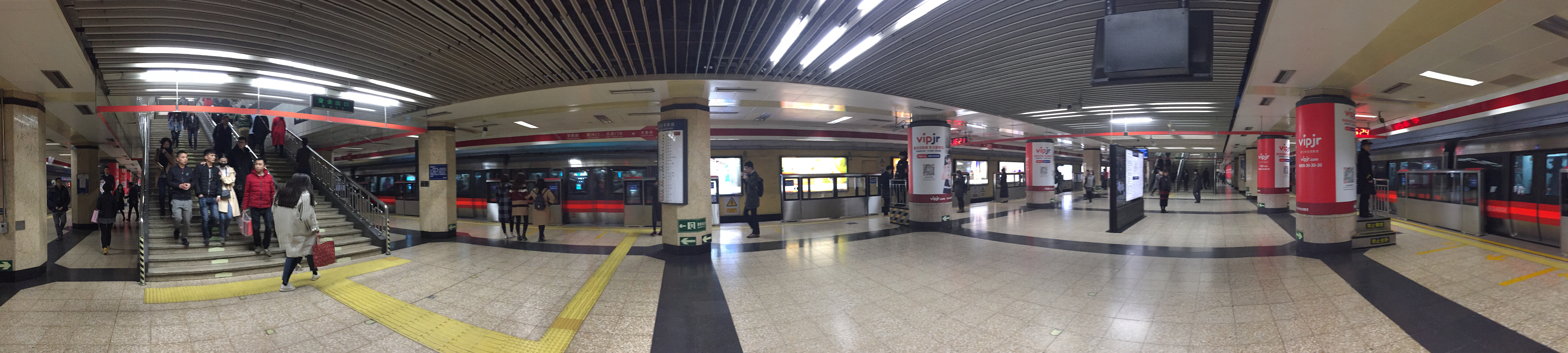
Platform panorama (March 2017)

== Exit ==
Wangfujing station has 11 exits: A, B1, B2, B3, C1, C2, C3, C4, E1, E3, F1. Exit E3 is next to Gongmei Building on the north side of the intersection of Wangfujing Street and Dongdan Santiao. Exit F1 is located on the east side of Wangfujing Street (between Dashamao Hutong and Xiagongfu Street), northwest of the west gate of Oriental Plaza. Exits E3 and F1 are equipped with ramps, of which the ramp at Exit F1 is dedicated to luggage.
