= Gongzhufen station =

Beijing Subway interchange station

Gongzhufen 公主坟
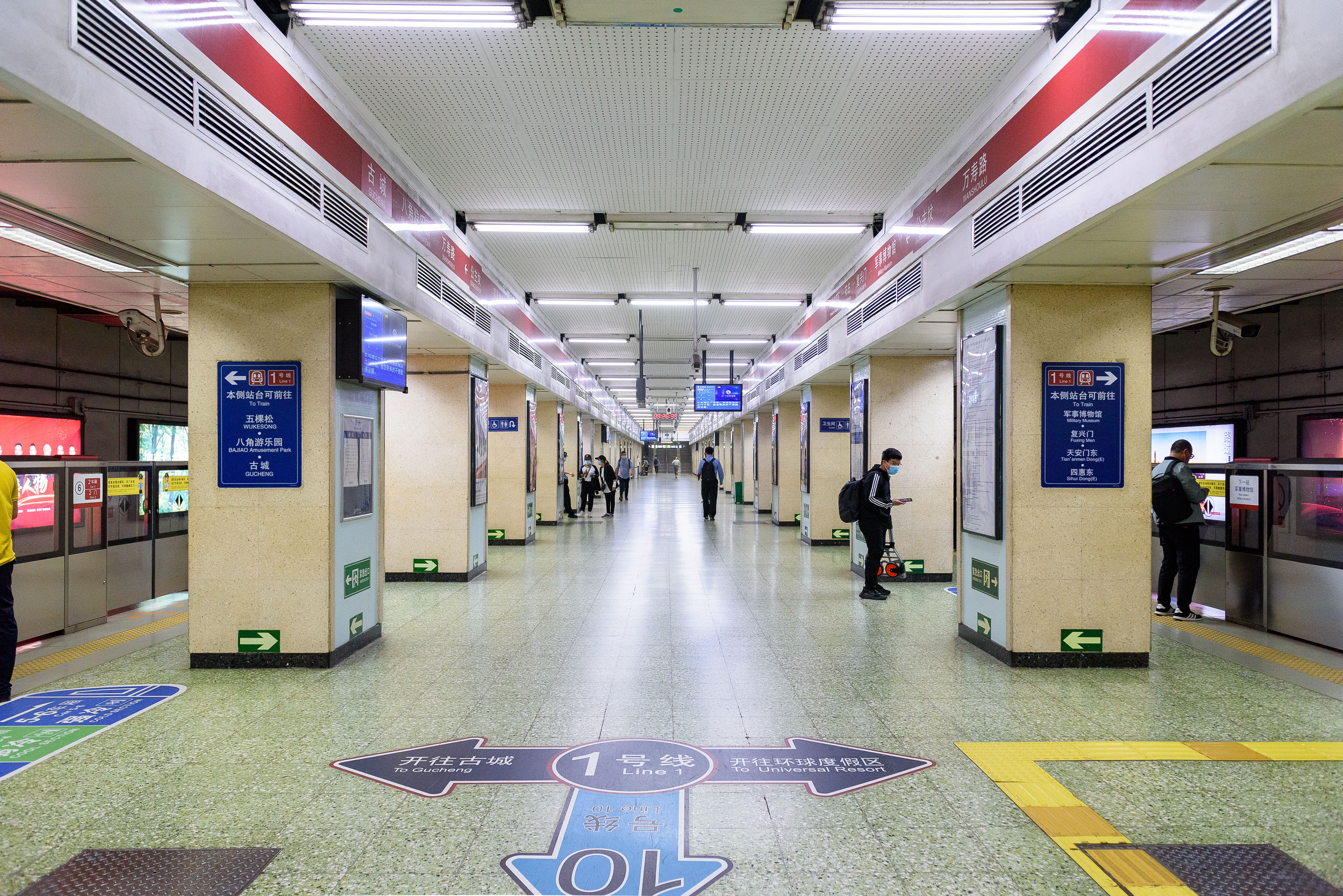
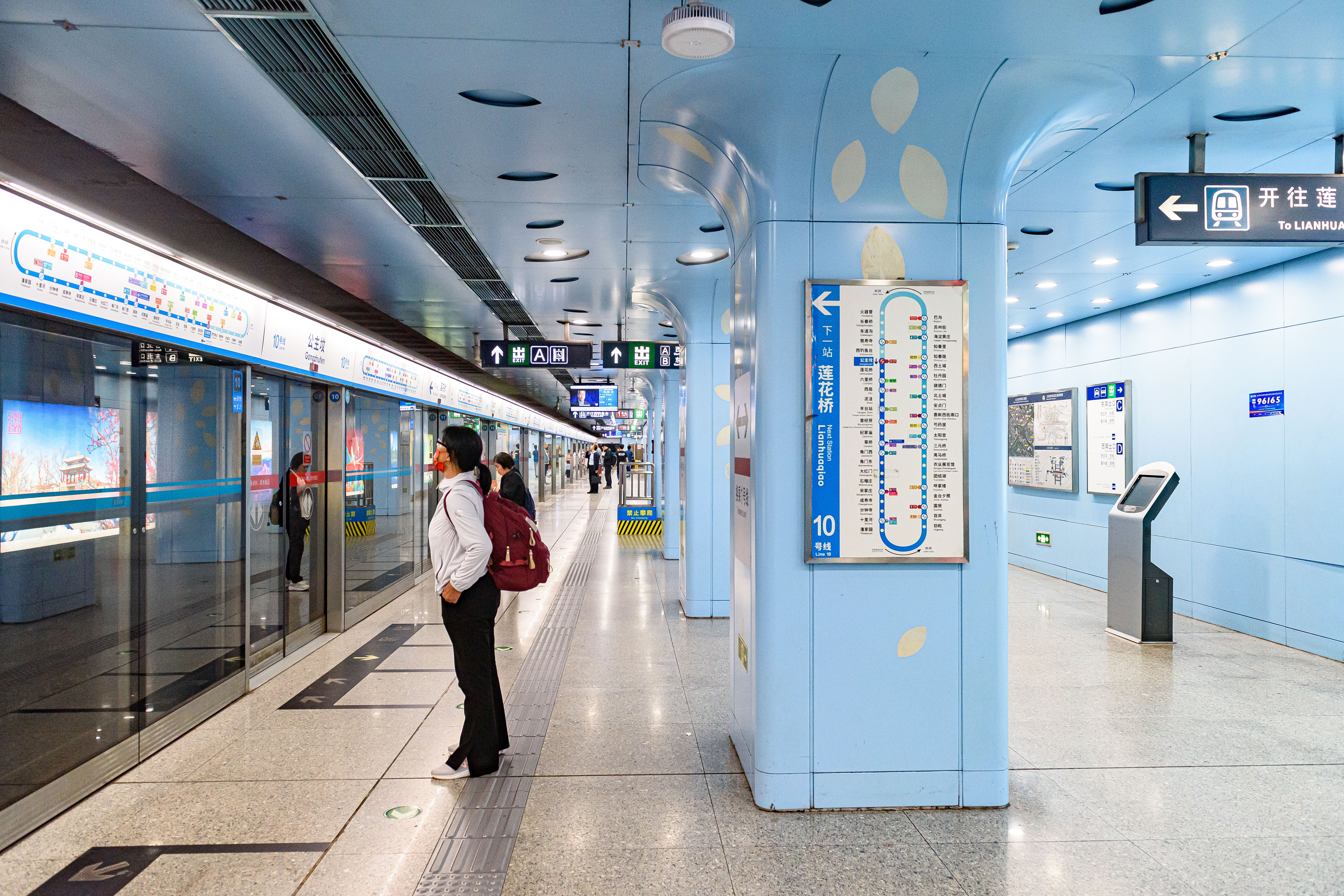
- Line 1 platform Line 10 platform

General information
- Location: Fuxing Road and West 3rd Ring Road Middle; Yangfangdian Subdistrict, Haidian District, Beijing; China
- Coordinates: 39°54′27″N 116°18′36″E
- Operator: Beijing Mass Transit Railway Operation Corporation Limited
- Lines: Line 1; Line 10
- Platforms: 4 (1 split island platform and 1 island platform)
- Tracks: 4

Construction
- Structure type: Underground
- Accessible: Yes

Other information
- Station code: 110 (Line 1)

History
- Opened: January 15, 1971; 55 years ago (Line 1); December 30, 2012; 13 years ago (Line 10)
- Former names: Lixin (立新)

Services
Preceding station	Beijing Subway	Following station
Wanshou Lu towards Pingguoyuan	Line 1	Military Museum towards Universal Resort
Lianhua Qiao outer loop / anticlockwise	Line 10	Xidiaoyutai inner loop / clockwise
Location
- Location within Beijing

Gongzhufen Station (simplified Chinese: 公主坟站; traditional Chinese: 公主墳站; pinyin: Gōngzhǔfén Zhàn) is an interchange station on Line 1 and Line 10 of the Beijing Subway.

== Station layout ==
Both the line 1 and 10 stations have underground island platforms.

== Exits ==
The station originally had eight exits. When line 10 started serving the station, the original exits were closed. There are currently four exits, lettered A, B, C, and D. Exits A and D are accessible.

== Gallery ==
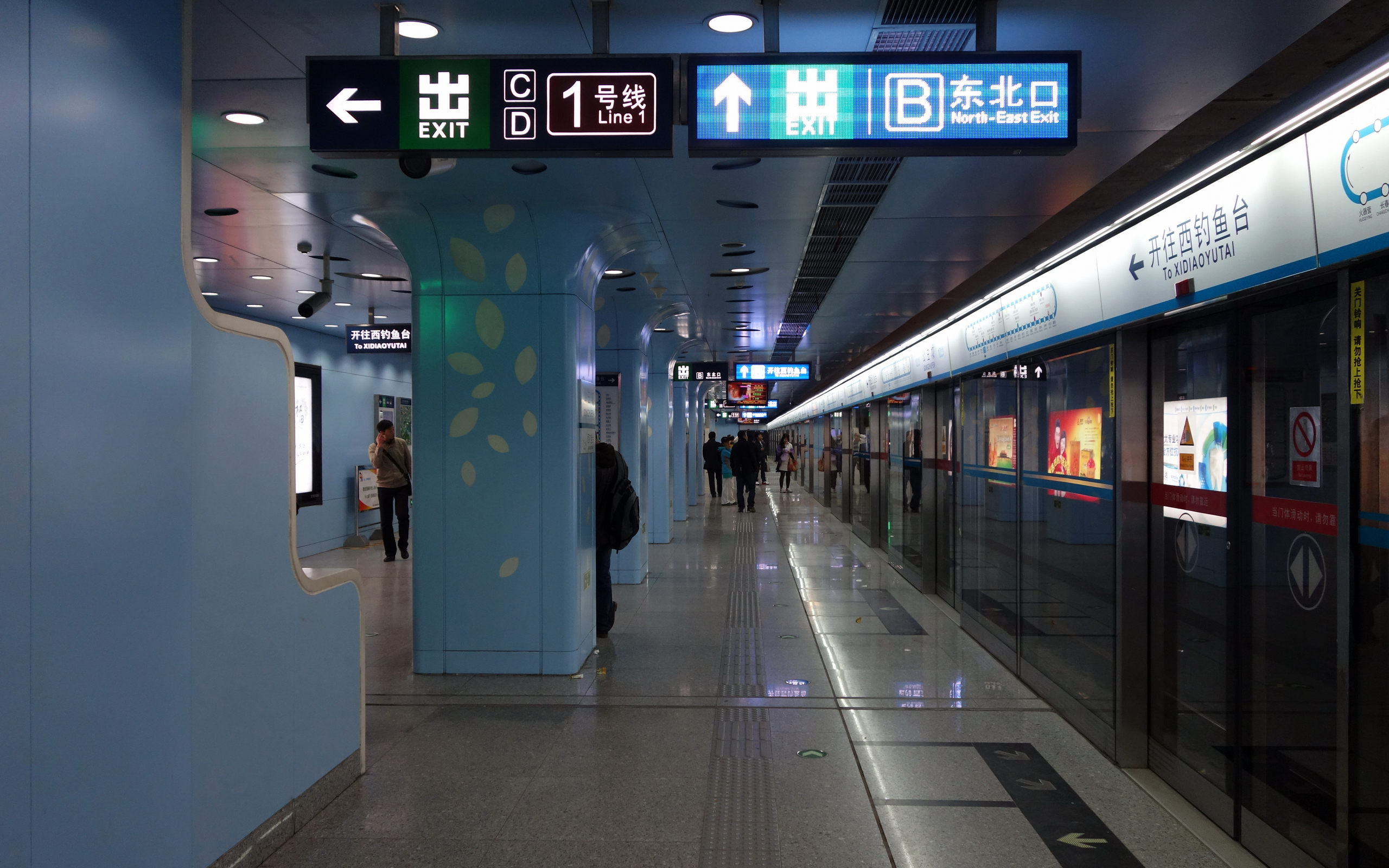
Line 10 platform (October 2013)

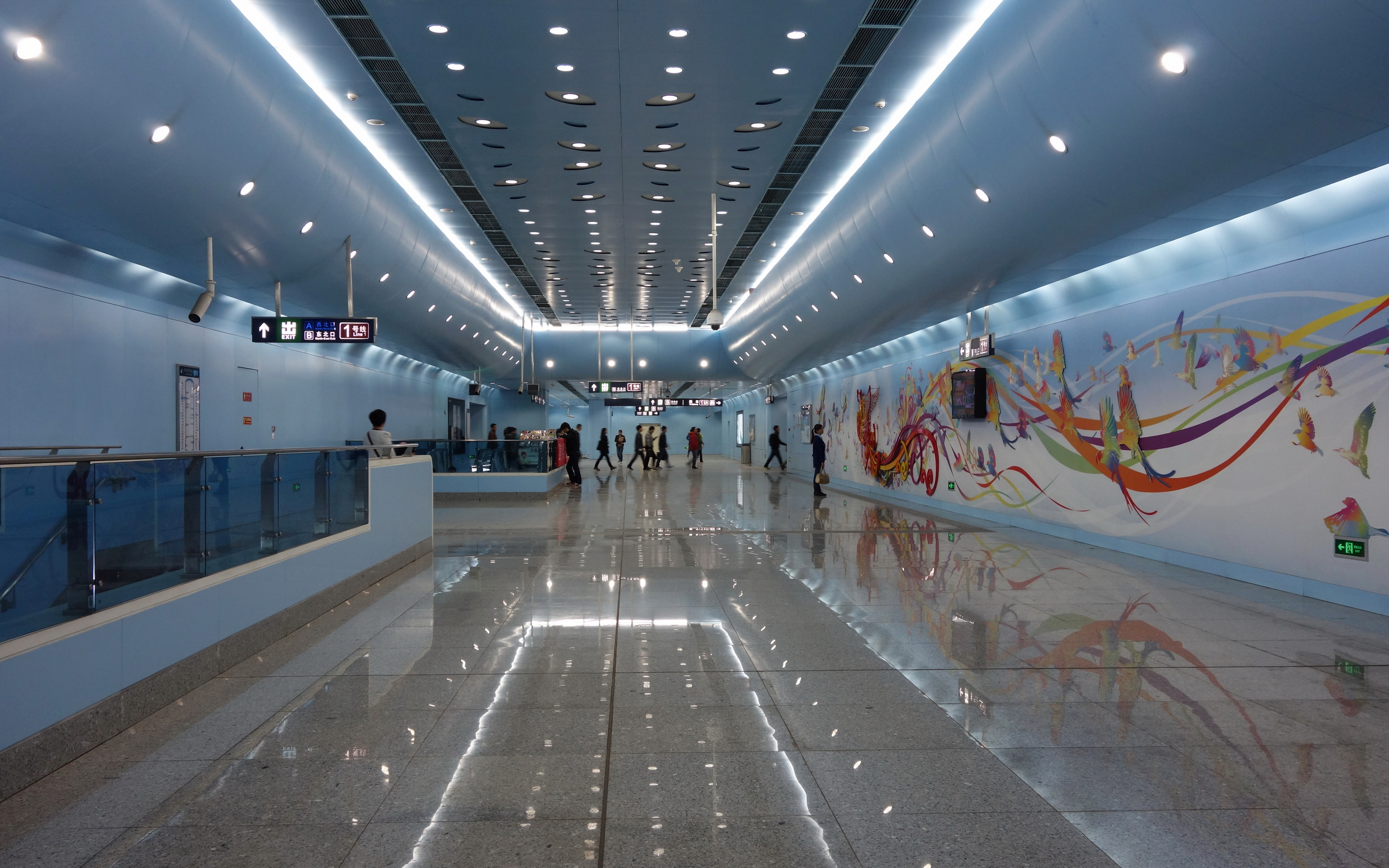
Line 10 concourse [1]

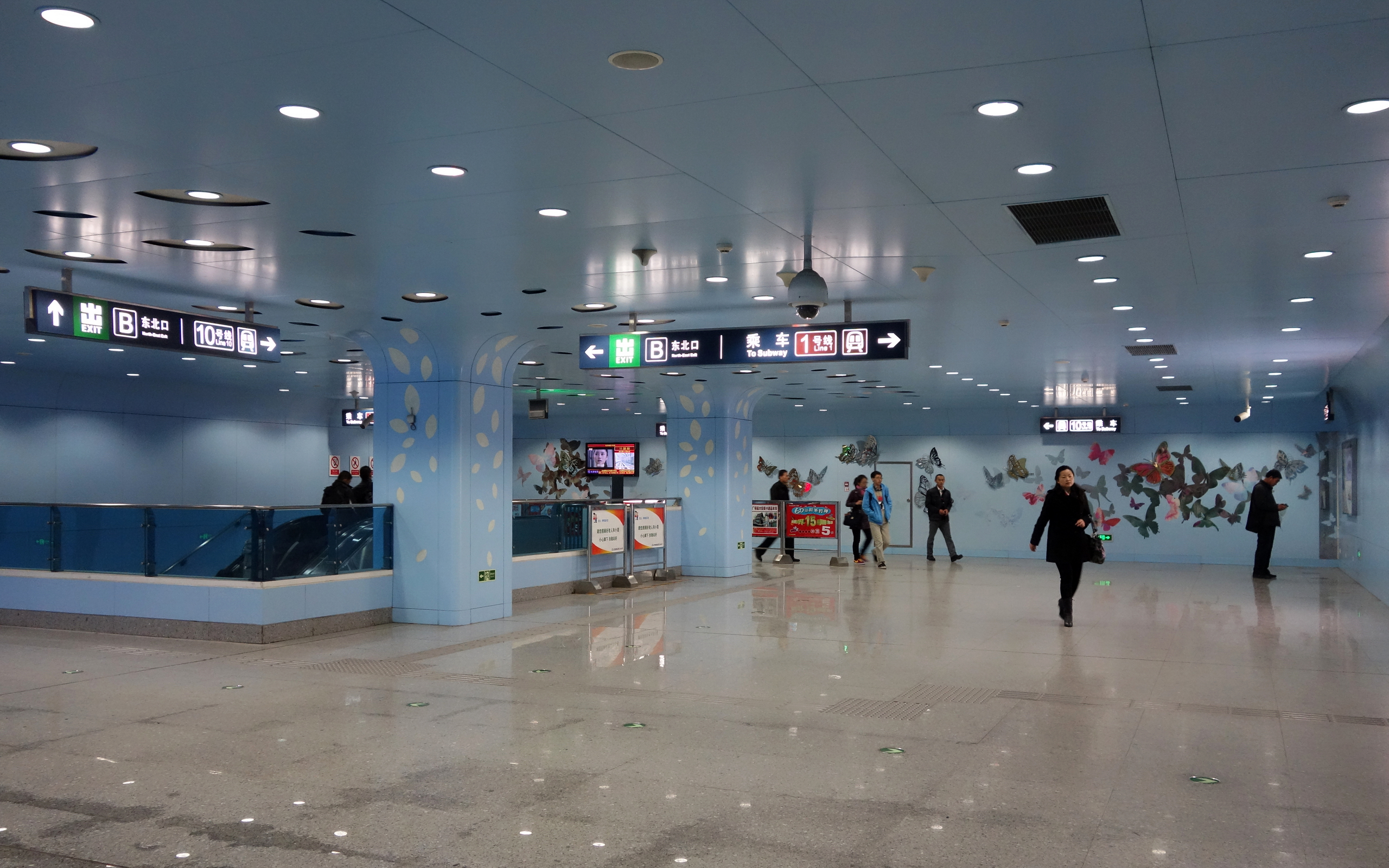
Line 10 concourse [2]
