= Line 1 (Beijing Subway) =

Metro line in Beijing, China

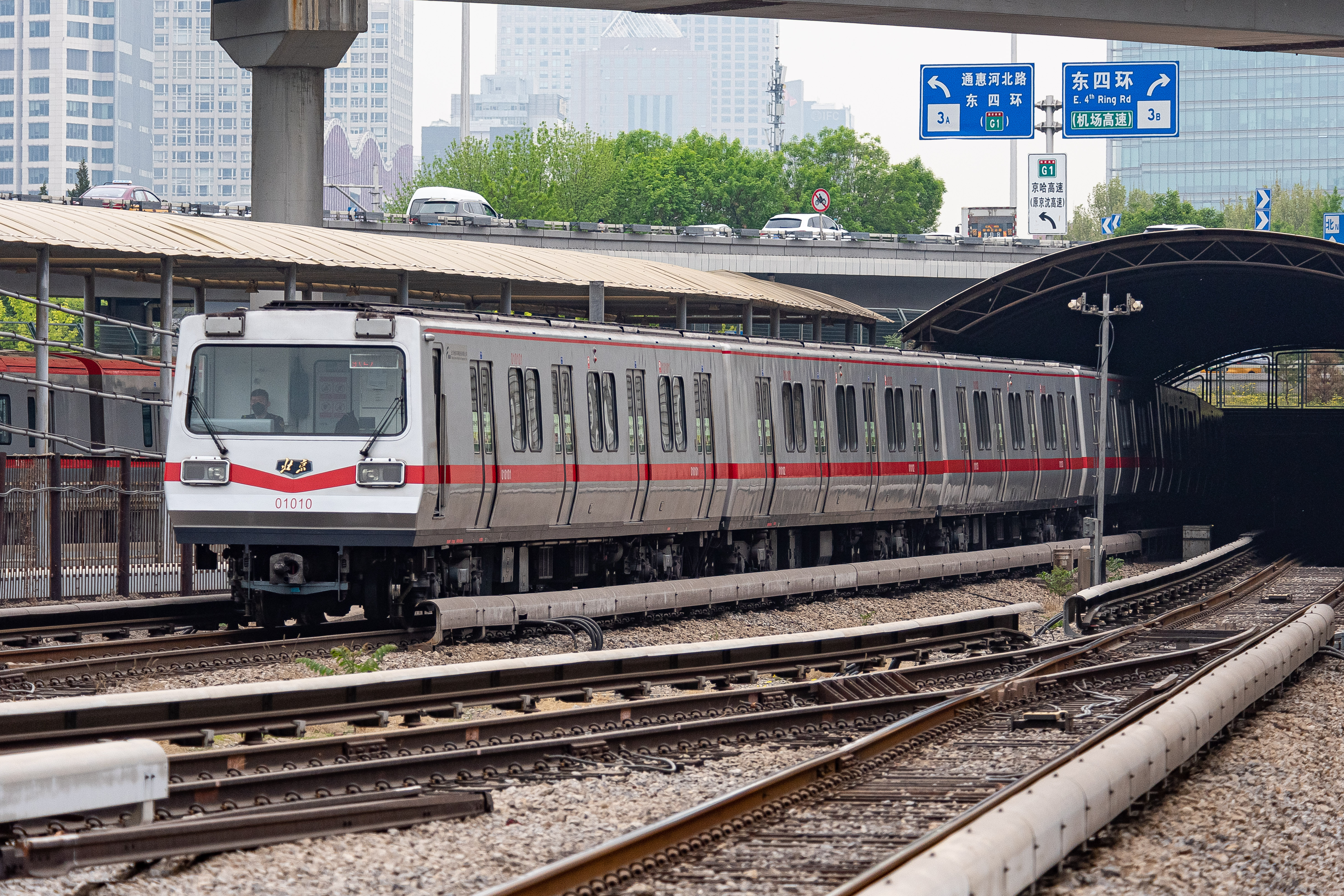
- A Line 1 train entering Sihui station

Overview
- Other name(s): M1 (planned name); Fuba line (Chinese: 复八线, for Fuxingmen to Sihuidong section)
- Status: Operational
- Locale: Chaoyang, Dongcheng, Xicheng, Haidian, and Shijingshan districts Beijing
- Termini: Pingguoyuan (Fushouling opens TBD); Sihuidong
- Stations: 23 (not accounting for Batong Line, but including Gaobeidian)
- Color on map: Dark red

Service
- Type: Rapid transit
- System: Beijing Subway
- Operator(s): Beijing Mass Transit Railway Operation Corp., Ltd.
- Depot(s): Gucheng, Sihui Depots
- Rolling stock: 6-car Quasi-Type B (DKZ4, SFM04)
- Daily ridership: 880,600 (2024 Avg.)

History
- Opened: January 15, 1971; 55 years ago

Technical
- Line length: 31.4 km (19.5 mi)
- Character: Underground, at-grade (Note: The section from Sihui to Sihui East is at-grade.)
- Track gauge: 1,435 mm (4 ft 8 1/2 in)
- Electrification: 750 V DC third rail
- Operating speed: 80 km/h (maximum service speed)

Line 1 of the Beijing Subway (Chinese: 北京地铁1号线; pinyin: Běijīng dìtiě yīhào xiàn) is the oldest and one of the busiest lines of Beijing's mass transit rail network. The line runs underneath Chang'an Avenue, the city's grand east–west thoroughfare, right through the heart of Beijing with stops on either side of Tiananmen Square. Line 1's color is dark red. Through operation with the Batong line started on August 29, 2021.

== Ridership ==
As the oldest line of the Beijing Subway, Line 1 was also the most heavily used from the time the subway opened in 1971 until January 2013, when the near-completion of the Line 10 loop caused ridership on that line to surge past Line 1. Daily ridership averaged 1,234,900 in 2014. Peak ridership in 2014 was 1,536,900.

Recent traffic relief efforts have been completed in recent years. The opening of the first phase of the parallel Line 6, caused an 8.46% decrease in daily demand and a 10-20% reduction in peak flow during rush hour. In addition Beijing BRT line 2 parallels the eastern section of Line 1. In the meantime between 2014 and 2015, Line 1 again upgraded its signals to a communications-based train control system allowing trains to run at headways as low as 1 minutes 45 seconds. However, during peak hours, sections of the line were reported in 2013 to still operate above 100% capacity.

== Hours of operation ==
The first east-bound trains departs from Gucheng at 4:58 am and Pingguoyuan at 5:10 am. The first west-bound train departs Sihui at 4:56 am and Sihui East at 5:05 am. The last east-bound train leaves Pingguoyuan at 10:55 pm. The last west-bound train leaves Sihui East at 11:15 pm.

== Route ==
Line 1's western terminus is Pingguoyuan, located in Shijingshan District. The line heads southeast to its second stop at Gucheng and from there runs straight east, following Chang'an Avenue all the way to its eastern terminus, Sihuidong in Chaoyang District, just beyond the 4th Ring Road. The line passes through Xidan, Wangfujing and Dongdan, among other important commercial centers of Xicheng and Dongcheng Districts, as well as the Beijing CBD near the China World Trade Center. The line is 31.04 km (19.29 mi) in length with 23 stations in operation. All stations except for Sihui and Sihuidong are underground.

== Stations ==
Station list for Line 1 and Batong line of Beijing Subway, after the through operation started on August 29, 2021.
● Normal: Pingguoyuan — Universal Resort
● Morning rush hour: Gongzhufen — Guoyuan
● Evening rush hour: Pingguoyuan — Guoyuan

Line Name	Service routes			Station Name		Connections	Nearby Bus Stops	Distance km		Location
Line Name	Service routes			English	Chinese	Connections	Nearby Bus Stops	Distance km		Location
Line 1				Fushouling (Opening date to be determined)	福寿岭					Shijingshan
Line 1	●		●	Pingguoyuan	苹果园	6 S1	325 336 358 370 396 399 472 527 597 892 920 929 931 932 941快 948 961 972 977 977快 981 M3 M4 M5 M6 M7 M11 M16 M20 M22 专210	0.000	0.000	Shijingshan
Line 1	●		●	Gucheng	古城		1 318 327 337 399 597 941 958 959 992 快速直达专线208 快速直达专线213 快速直达专线222 夜5 专61 专198 专210 专218	2.606	2.606	Shijingshan
Line 1	｜		｜	Bajiao Amusement Park (Under renovation, re-opening May 3, 2027)	八角游乐园		1 325 337 373 436 472 527 574 597 598 663 914 941 959 965 992 夜5 专46 专86 专91 专111 专215	1.921	4.527	Shijingshan
Line 1	●		●	Babaoshan	八宝山		1 1区 76 337 373 527 546 574 597 610 914 941 951 961 979 快速直达专线187 夜1 专69 专109 专111 专215	1.953	6.480	Shijingshan
Line 1	●		●	Yuquan Lu	玉泉路		1 1区 76 78 337 338 354 370 373 389 436 452 463 472 473 481 507 610 612 644 941 941快 979 夜1 专11	1.479	7.959	Shijingshan
Line 1	●		●	Wukesong	五棵松		1 1区 64 76 97 337 370 400 400快 436 568 624 683 952 967 982 夜1 专127	1.810	9.769	Haidian
Line 1	●		●	Wanshou Lu	万寿路		1 1区 32 33 64 68 76 77 89 308 335 337 370 624 627 夜1 夜5	1.778	11.547	Haidian
Line 1	●	●	●	Gongzhufen	公主坟	10	1 1区 32 33 40 52 62 64 68 74 76 77 89 94 134 300 300快 308 323 335 337 368 370 394 437 603 624 631快 698 977 977快 夜1 夜5 夜30	1.313	12.860	Haidian
Line 1	●	●	●	Military Museum	军事博物馆	9	1 1区 21 40 52 68 78 85 94 308 414 夜1 夜5 夜8 专7	1.172	14.032	Haidian
Line 1	●	●	●	Muxidi	木樨地	16 (out-of-system interchange)	1 1区 21 32 52 68 78 85 94 114 308 320 夜1 夜8	1.166	15.198	Xicheng
Line 1	●	●	●	Nanlishi Lu	南礼士路		1 1区 3 10 15 19 46 49 52 56 夜1 夜8	1.291	16.489	Xicheng
Line 1	●	●	●	Fuxingmen	复兴门	2; 19 (Out-of-system interchange via Taipingqiao)	1 1区 10 15 44 49 52 200 332 387 395 423 691 夜1 夜20 专191	0.424	16.913	Xicheng
Line 1	●	●	●	Xidan	西单	4	1 1区 7 15 22 52 83 88 102 105 109 143 夜1 夜4	1.590	18.503	Xicheng
Line 1	●	●	●	Tian'anmenxi	天安门西		1 1区 5 52 观光1 观光2 夜1	1.217	19.720	Xicheng
Line 1	●	●	●	Tian'anmendong	天安门东		1 1区 2 52 82 120 观光1 观光2 夜1 夜2	0.925	20.645	Dongcheng
Line 1	●	●	●	Wangfujing	王府井	8	1 1区 41 52 103 120 141 观光2 夜1	0.852	21.497	Dongcheng
Line 1	●	●	●	Dongdan	东单	5	1 1区 41 52 104 106 108 110 111 120 128 140 684 夜1	0.774	22.271	Dongcheng
Line 1	●	●	●	Jianguomen	建国门	2	1 1区 24 39 44 52 58 120 122 126 139 140 142 200 403 637 639 夜1 夜19 夜20 夜24 夜28 夜29	1.230	23.501	Dongcheng
Line 1	●	●	●	Yong'an Li	永安里	17	1 1区 9 28 39 58 120 126 140 403 639 668 夜1 夜24	1.377	24.878	Chaoyang
Line 1	●	●	●	Guomao	国贸	10	1 1区 9 11 28 57 58 72 98 113 348 368 382 388 402 405 488 561 650 666 667 668 669 687 804 805快 806 807 809 814 817 818 818快 848 930 938快 938快区 快速直达专线5 快速直达专线9 快速直达专线20 快速直达专线61 夜1 夜27 夜30 专10	0.790	25.668	Chaoyang
Line 1	●	●	●	Dawang Lu	大望路	14	1 1区 11 31 54 57 58 138 382 388 405 486 605 666 667 668 804 812 815 815快 817 818 818快 823 930 973 985 988 快速直达专线5 快速直达专线20 快速直达专线61 夜1 夜27 夜34 专165	1.385	27.053	Chaoyang
Line 1	●	●	●	Sihui	四惠		1 1区 54 57 58 322 397 405 455 468 475 496 506 517 553 605 657 666 671 865 988 989 夜1 夜27 专113 专167	1.673	28.726	Chaoyang
Line 1	●	●	●	Sihuidong	四惠东		397 468 475 506 517 553 666 夜27	1.714	30.440	Chaoyang
Batong line	●	●	●	Gaobeidian	高碑店		363 397 475 506 517 666 夜27	1.375	31.815	Chaoyang
Batong line	●	●	●	Communication Univ of China	传媒大学		397 475 506 666 夜27 专36 专156	2.002	33.817	Chaoyang
Batong line	●	●	●	Shuang Qiao	双桥		382 397 411 451 475 506 666 夜27	1.894	35.711	Chaoyang
Batong line	●	●	●	Guaanzhuang	管庄		364 388 442 532 615 666 690 BRT2(快速公交2) 夜27 专39 专211	1.912	37.623	Chaoyang
Batong line	●	●	●	Bali Qiao	八里桥		322 615 666 668 807 夜27	1.763	39.386	Chaoyang
Batong line	●	●	●	Tongzhou Beiyuan	通州北苑		316 317 322 372 591 615 666 667 804 805 806 809 810 811 861 924 938 快速直达专线1 快速直达专线147 快速直达专线174 快速直达专线195 快速直达专线196 T1 T2 T3 T4 T10 T11 T12 T13 T19 T41 T43 T51 T60 T87 T90 T118 夜27 专157	1.700	41.086	Tongzhou
Batong line	●	●	●	Guoyuan	果园		312 316 317 552 591 668 805 938 快速直达专线1 快速直达专线147 快速直达专线166 快速直达专线195 T10 T11 T12 T19 T26 T36 T41 T44 T68 T68区 T87 T118 夜29	1.465	42.551	Tongzhou
Batong line	●			Jiukeshu	九棵树		372 582 587 668 805 810 938 快速直达专线1 T5 T7 T9 T10 T13 T14 T17 T21 T25 T26 T40 T41 T43 T44 T45 T62 T64 T65 T68 T71 T72 T73 T87 T90 T101 T102 T113 T117	0.990	43.541	Tongzhou
Batong line	●			Liyuan	梨园		342 372 587 589 668 805 806 810 913 938 快速直达专线1 快速直达专线166 T5 T7 T9 T10 T13 T14 T17 T18 T21 T26 T34 T40 T41 T43 T50 T53 T62 T64 T65 T68 T72 T73 T90 T101 T102 T109	1.225	44.766	Tongzhou
Batong line	●			Linheli	临河里		435 587 589 591 806 810 924 938 快速直达专线166 T4 T5 T9 T13 T14 T17 T21 T26 T34 T38 T40 T41 T43 T50 T53 T62 T64 T68 T72 T73 T90 T101 T102 T107 T116 T118 专203	1.257	46.023	Tongzhou
Batong line	●			Tu Qiao	土桥		435 591 805 806 807 810 910 924 938 快速直达专线166 快速直达专线167 快速直达专线195 T5 T6 T9 T13 T14 T17 T21 T26 T34 T38 T40 T41 T43 T50 T64 T72 T73 T90 T101 T105 T107 T108 T112 T115 T116 T118	0.776	46.799	Tongzhou
Batong line	●			Huazhuang	花庄	7	589 806 T14 T34 T40 T43 T53 T68 T72 T73 T90 T101 T102 T103 T116	2.238	49.037	Tongzhou
Batong line	●			Universal Resort	环球度假区	7	589 T116	1.863	50.900	Tongzhou

== History ==
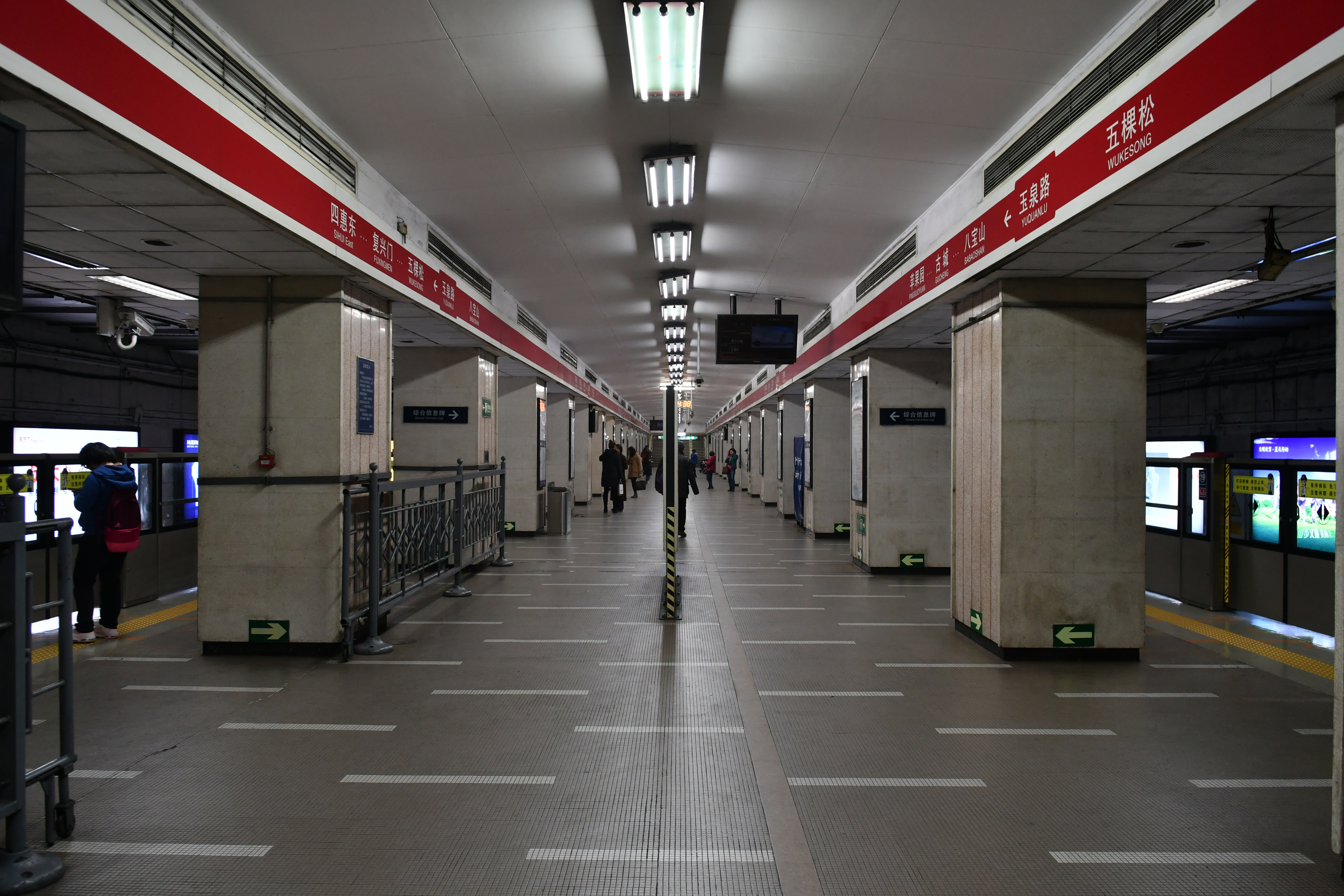
Yuquan Lu station, Opened on August 5, 1971. The first phase of the Beijing subway project groundbreaking ceremony was held west of Yuquanlu Road.

The first section of subway in Beijing officially started trial operation on January 15, 1971. It was 10.7 km (6.6 mi) long and ran between Beijing railway station to Gongzhufen, (Note: In 1970s, Gongzhufen was called Lixin (立新)) which today is a section of Line 1 and 2. A few months later, on August 15, 1971, the line was extended 3 stations west, to Yuquan Lu. The line was extended again to Gucheng in November. On April 23, 1973, the line was extended Pingguoyuan, at this point the line is 23.6 km (14.7 mi) long with 17 stations. On September 15, 1981, the line was again extended westward to Fushouling creating a 27.6 km (17.1 mi) long line with 19 stations. The line was transferred to the newly created Beijing Mass Transit Operation Corporation and was officially opened to the public, ending the decade long trial operation period. By 1981, the annual passenger volume of Beijing Subway was 64.66 million passengers, with a daily average of 177,000 passenger trips.

On August 15, 1986, the second phase of subway construction started and a feasibility study on the construction of the new line between of Fuxingmen to Bawangfen (Today's Beijing CBD) was carried out. A new branch heading east to a new station, Fuxingmen, was completed between Nanlishi Lu and Changchun Jie stations on December 28, 1987. The section between Changchun Jie and Beijing railway station was transferred to the newly created Line 2 and Line 1 ran between Pingguoyuan and Fuxingmen stations. In January 1991, the feasibility study report on the construction of a new line between Fuxingmen to Bawangfen was approved with construction of the new "Fuba line", starting in June 1992. On December 12, 1992, Line 1 was extended east for one station to Xidan. In 1994, Line 1's signals were upgraded to automatic train protection system. On September 28, 1999, the first section of the Fuba line between Tian'anmenxi to Sihuidong was opened. On June 28, 2000, the section between Xidan and Tian'anmenxi stations opened, merging Line 1 and the Fuba Line to create a 31 km (19 mi) line with 23 stations.

Segment	Commencement	Length	Station(s)	Name
Gongzhufen — Beijing Railway Station	15 January 1971 (Note: 15 January 1971 - Initial line began operation on a trial basis.)	10.7 km (6.65 mi)	10	Phase 1 (initial section)
Yuquan Lu — Gongzhufen	5 August 1971	4.9 km (3.04 mi)	3	Yuquan Lu extension
Gucheng — Yuquan Lu	7 November 1971	5.4 km (3.36 mi)	3	Gucheng extension
Pingguoyuan — Gucheng	23 April 1973	2.6 km (1.62 mi)	1	Pingguoyuan extension
Nanlishilu — Fuxingmen	28 December 1987	0.4 km (0.25 mi)	1	Line 1 & 2 realignment project
Changchun Jie — Beijing Railway Station	28 December 1987	−6.1 km (−3.79 mi)	-6	Line 1 & 2 realignment project
Fuxingmen — Xidan	12 December 1992	1.6 km (0.99 mi)	1	Xidan extension
Tian'anmenxi — Sihuidong	28 September 1999	10.1 km (6.28 mi)	10	Fuba line
Xidan — Tian'anmenxi	28 June 2000	1.3 km (0.81 mi)	2	Line 1 & Fuba line merging project

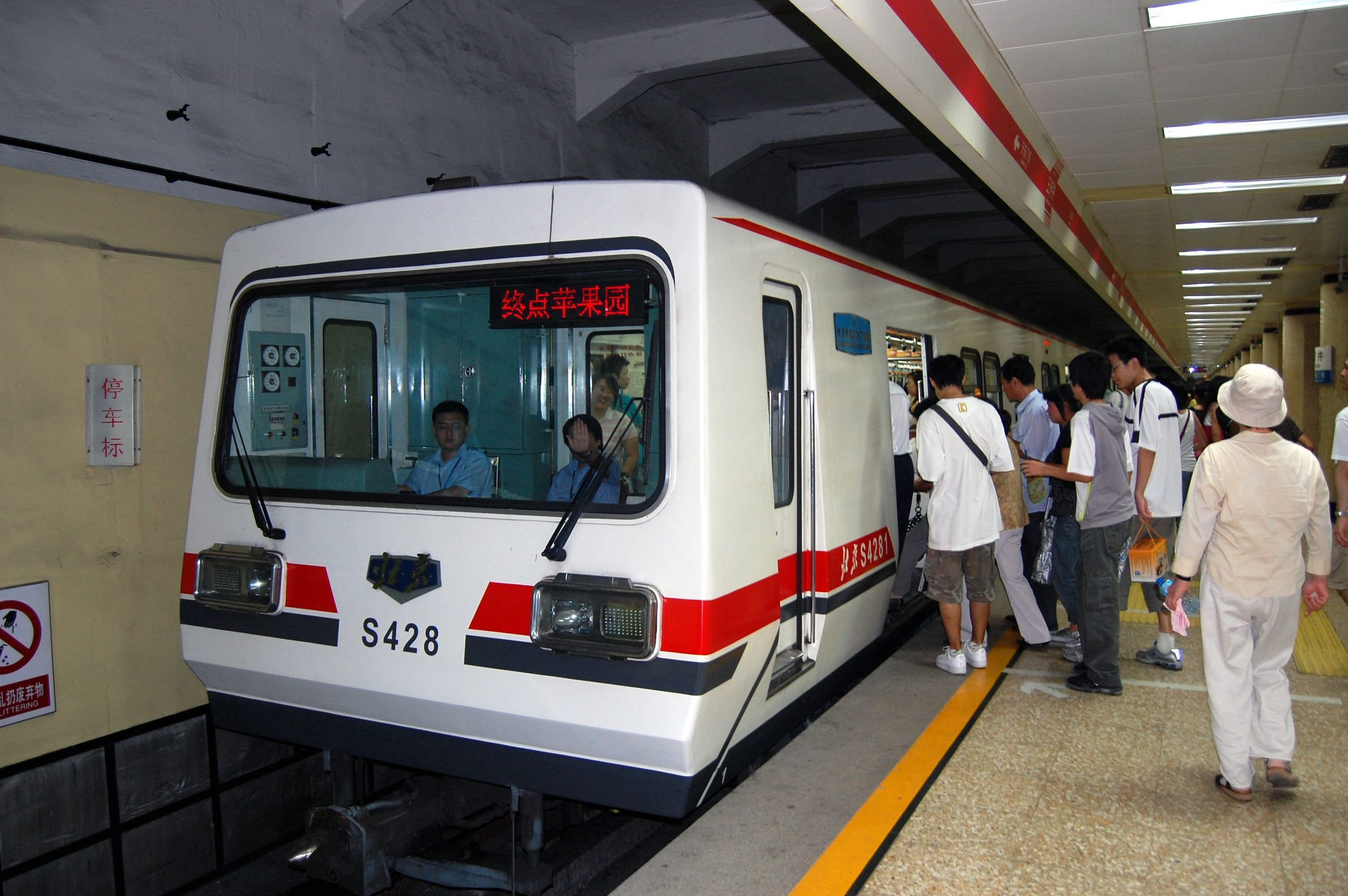
Line 1 train at Wangfujing in 2007.

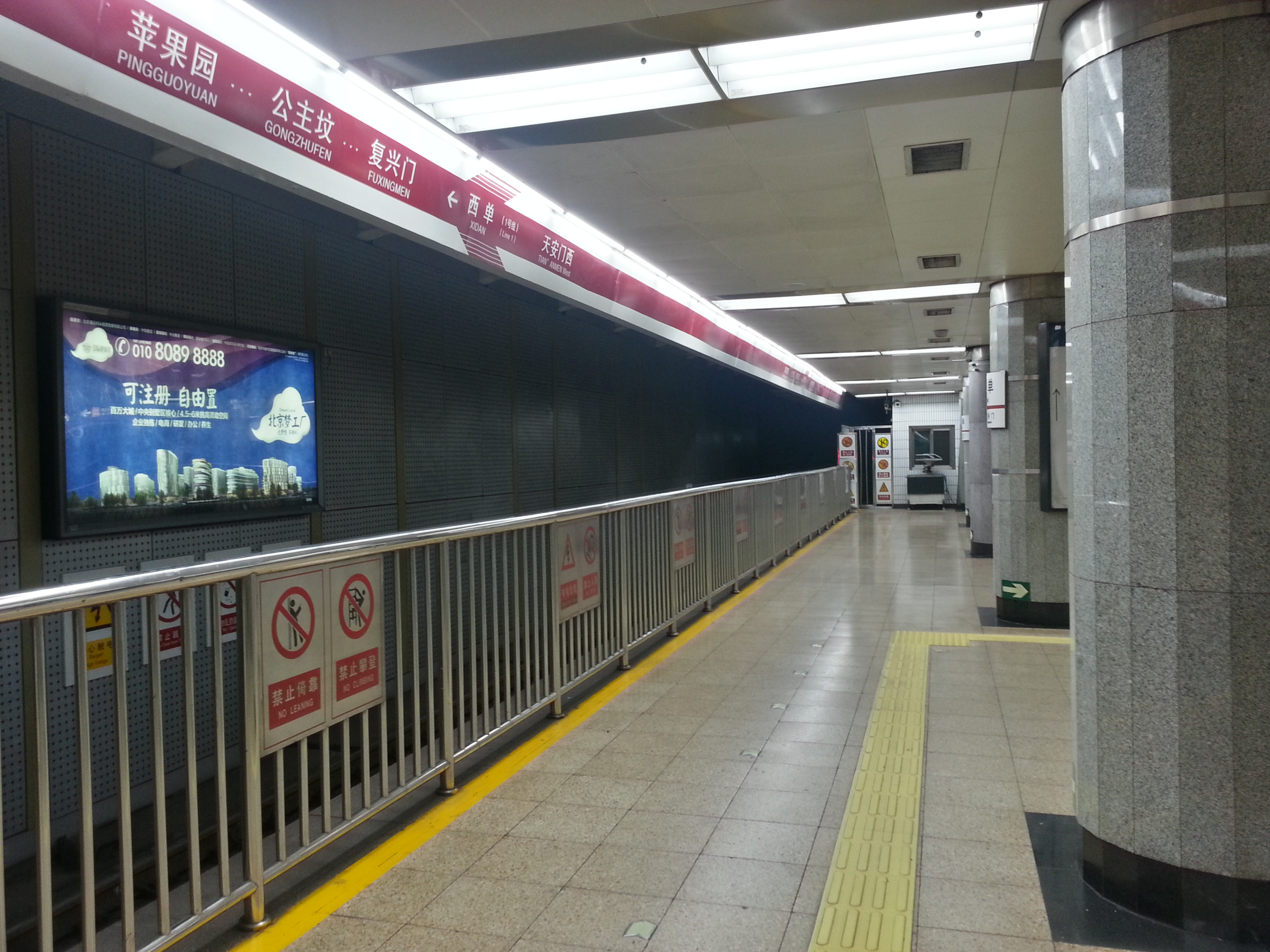
In 1992, Line 1 was extended east one station to Xidan.

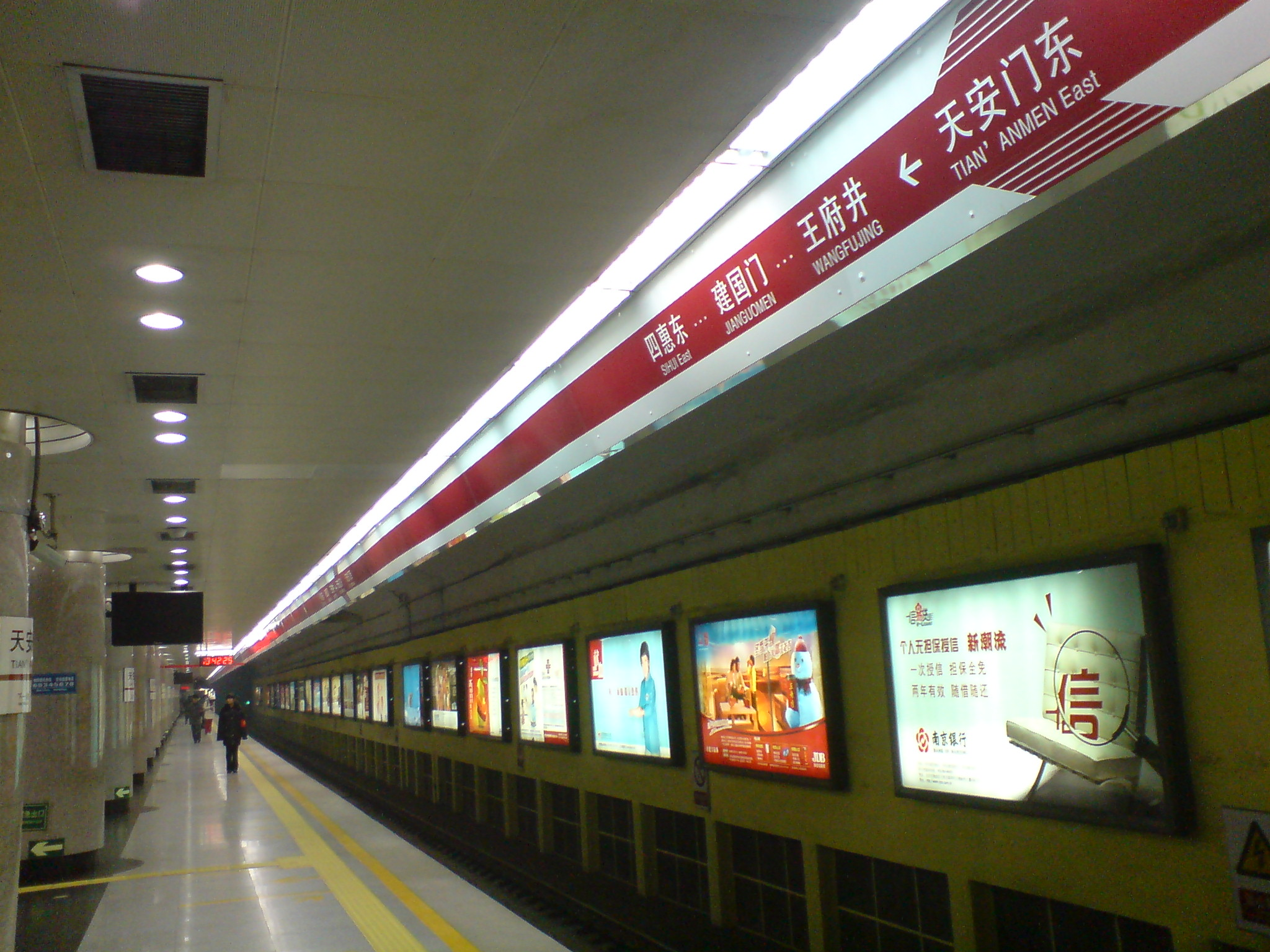
Platform of Tian'anmen East station

=== Headway Reduction ===
Since 2014, the signaling and power systems has been gradually upgraded to allow for trains to run more frequently. The upgraded CBTC moving block signaling system in place today reduces rush hour headways from every 2 minutes and 5 seconds to 1 minute 45 seconds.

=== Platform screen doors ===
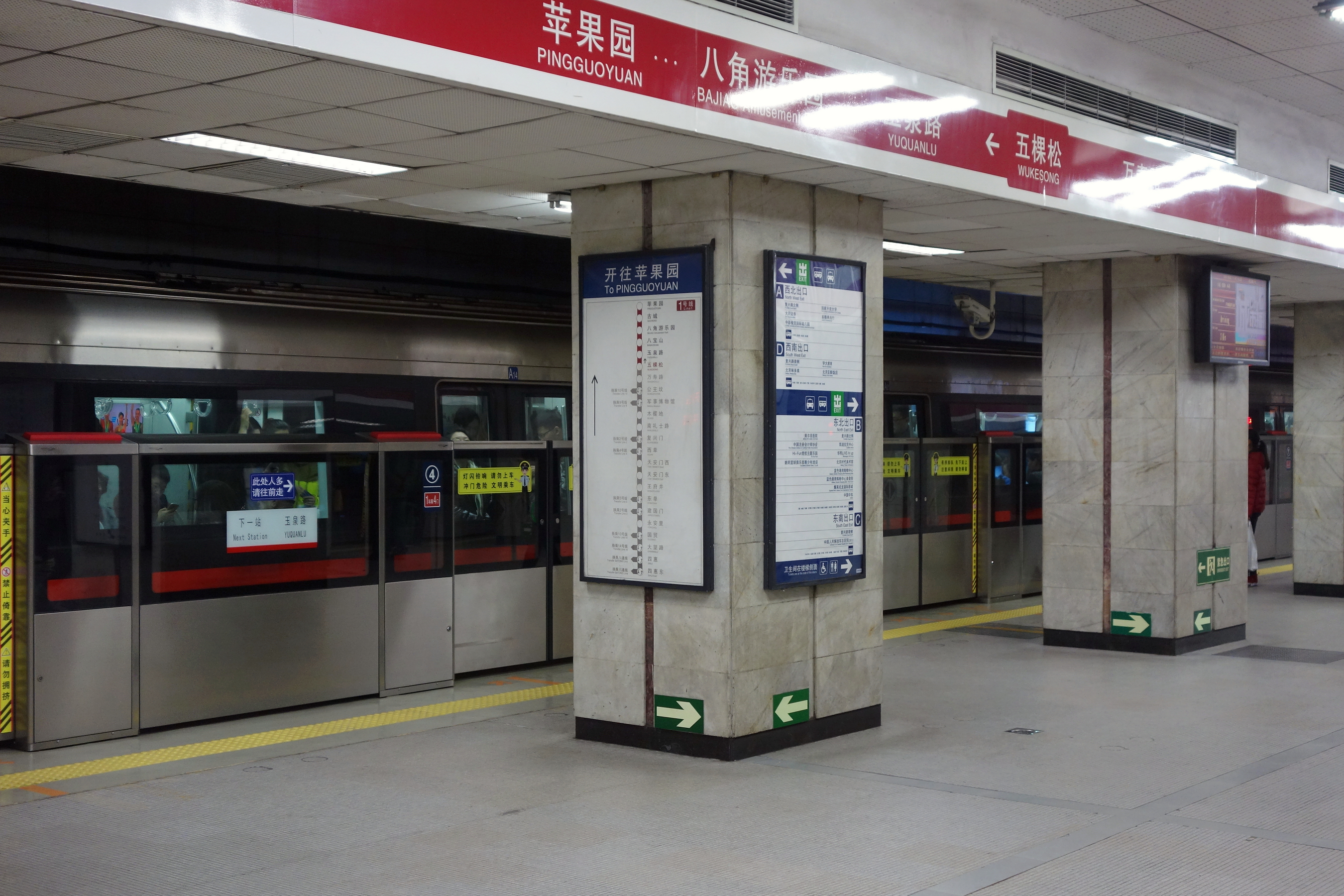
In 2017, platform screen doors were installed on the platform of Line 1.

Due to platform congestion and suicides, a proposal was made in 2010 to refit all stations on Line 1 with platform screen doors. However, the ventilation system in the older stations of Line 1 was incompatible with full-height platform screen doors, so half height platform screen doors were chosen instead. In July 2016, the operator began installing platform screen doors on Line 1. In 2016, the platform screen doors was installed at Yong'anli station. By the end of 2017, all stations except Pingguoyuan were retrofitted with half-height platform screen doors, and all the screen doors were put into operation for the first time.

=== Through operations with the Batong line ===
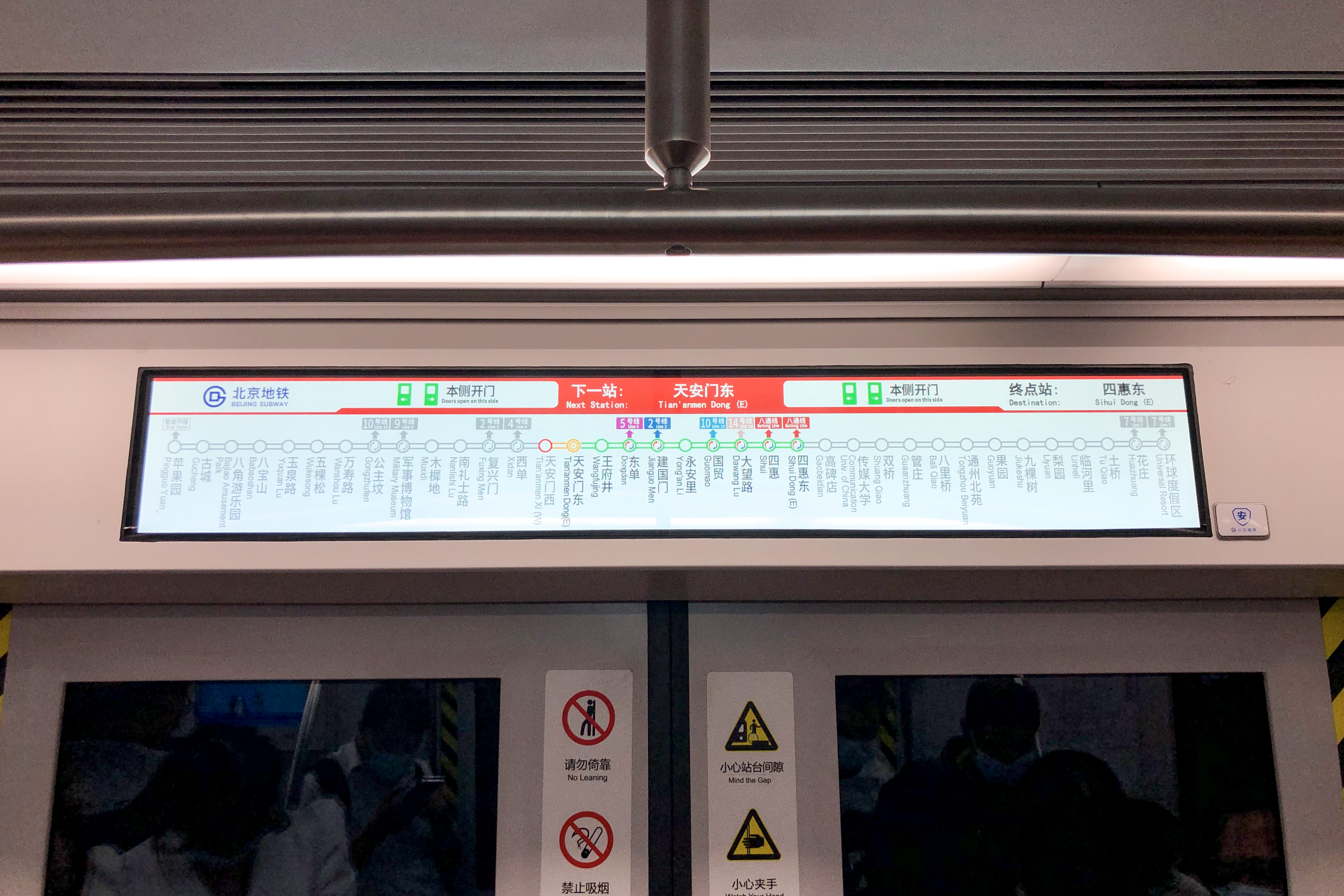
Route display reserved for through service from Pingguo Yuan to Universal Resort

In 2010, a CPPCC member Chen Dingwang, proposed that services on Line 1 and the Batong line should directly link, with through operations, reducing travel times and removing the unnecessary forced transfers at Sihuidong or Sihui. However, the Beijing Subway responded that Line 1's and Batong's signal systems are completely different, so through-operation will be more difficult to achieve, from an engineering standpoint. As of 2016, preliminary design and feasibility studies are underway to allow for through operations between Line 1 and Batong. On June 12, 2020, the project of the through operation of Line 1 and Batong line was approved by Beijing Development and Reform Commission. Through operation with the Batong line started on 29 August 2021.

== Other facilities ==
Rolling stock for Line 1 is parked and maintained at Gucheng Depot and Sihui Depot.

== Restricted stations ==
Beyond Pingguoyuan, Line 1 extends further northwest where it has several other stations: Station 53 (53站) and Fushouling (福寿岭). Station 53 is in the military region. Fushouling station is outside the military region and originally opened for rapid train for Subway Technology College students nearby, but closed as rapid train terminated in 2007. These stations are not open for public use.

Fushouling station began to renovate in 2021 as part of Line 1 west extension plan, and as part of Fushouling Transit Terminal. The renovation of the station was completed in 2024, but the opening date is yet to be determined, due to delay of the construction of transit terminal, and potential impact of closure of Bajiao Amusement Park station due to Line 1 branch construction.

A proposal to open the Station 53 to public is mentioned within 2022 and 2023 working plan of the Shijingshan District.

== Future Development ==
=== Increasing capacity ===
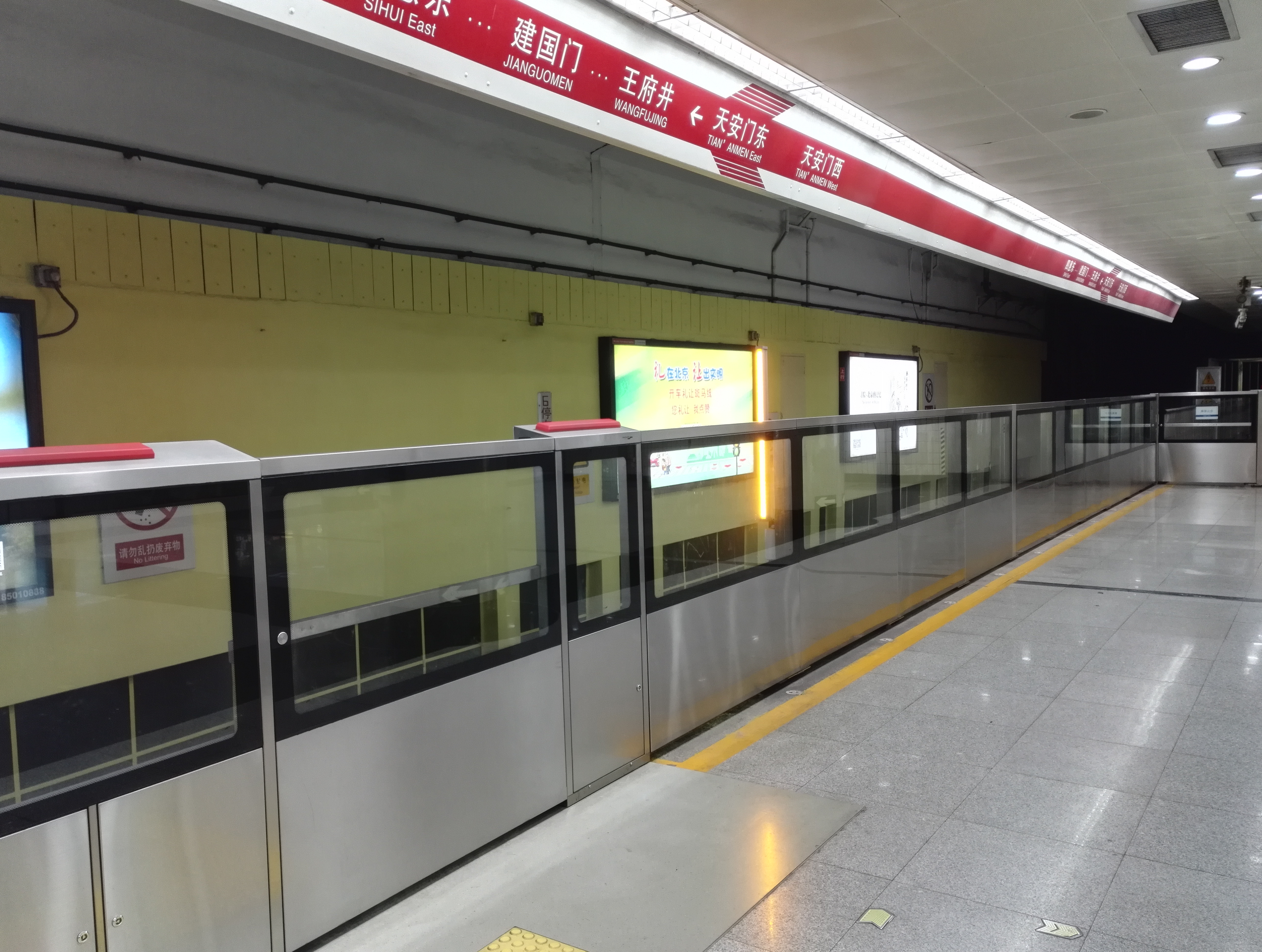
The platforms of some Line 1 stations are longer than the trains used on the line.

Due to Line 1's severe overcapacity problem, there are plans to introduce 7-car or longer trains. In order for this plan to proceed the oldest section of Line 1 between Pingguoyuan and Nanlishi Lu, which only has platforms long enough to accommodate 6-car trains, will need to be lengthened. The newer section between Fuxingmen and Sihuidong, formerly known as "Fuba line" during construction, has platforms long enough for 8-car trains. According to an interview to the director of Beijing Municipal Transport Commission in December 2022, they will introduce 7-car trains in the eastern section of Line 1 and the Batong line in future. However, the plan was later delayed indefinitely after through service between Line 1 and Batong Line begins, and the difficulties of lengthening platforms in Batong Line, which also only able to accommodate 6-car trains.

=== Branch to Qinglonghudong ===
On 8 July 2022, an EIA document regarding Phase III construction of Beijing rail transport system (2022–2027) mentions a proposal about the branch line of Line 1. The branch line is a southwest-to-northeast line starts from Qinglonghudong (located at the east side of Qinglong Lake, in Wangzuo Town, Fengtai District) to Bajiao Amusement Park in Shijingshan District. It will be 21 km (13 mi) in length with 9 new stations. Construction on the Line 1 branch began on January 18, 2024.

To facilitate construction of the extension, the project will need to renovate and expand Bajiao Amusement Park Station. According to the second announcement of the environmental impact assessment of the Line 1 branch line project released in October 2023, this station will be a new platform for the branch line of Line 1, and the new platform will be combined with the existing Line 1 platform to form a separate island platform, so that the station will become a double-island station. Since June 2, 2025, the station was closed for this renovation work, and it is expected to reopen on May 3, 2027.

Station name		Connections	Location
English	Chinese	Connections	Location
Bajiao Amusement Park	八角游乐园	1 (Main line)	Shijingshan
Yamenkouxi	衙门口西		Shijingshan
Garden Expo Park West	园博园西		Fengtai
Zhangguozhuang	张郭庄	14	Fengtai
Beigong	北宫		Fengtai
Houlücun railway station	后吕村		Fengtai
Yungang	云岗		Fengtai
Wangzuo	王佐		Fengtai
Weigezhuang	魏各庄		Fengtai
Qinglonghudong	青龙湖东		Fengtai

== Rolling Stock ==
The line uses 6-car Type B rolling stock.

=== Current ===
Model	Image	Manufacturer	Year built	Year refurbished	Amount in Service	Fleet numbers	Depot
DKZ4G		CRRC Changchun Railway Vehicles; Beijing Subway Rolling Stock Equipment	1998–2001	2007; 2010-2012; 2015-2016; 2020-2021	31	S401–S431 (01 001–01 031)	Sihui (except two in Gucheng)
SFM04/04A		CRRC Qingdao Sifang; Beijing Subway Rolling Stock Equipment	2006–2011	2021	39	G432–G470 (01 032–01 070)	Gucheng
SFM01/02/07		CRRC Qingdao Sifang; Beijing Subway Rolling Stock Equipment	2003–2005	2008; 2015-2020; 2021	108	TQ401–TQ408, TQ415–TQ424 (01 071–01 078, 01 085–01 094)	Tuqiao
BDK06		Beijing Subway Rolling Stock Equipment	2018–2021		72	TQ431–TQ437 (01 101–01 107), 01 108–01 112	Tuqiao, Sihui
BDK09		Beijing Subway Rolling Stock Equipment	2025–2026		1		Tuqiao, Sihui

=== Former ===
All were based at Gucheng depot.

Model	Image	Manufacturer	Year built	Years in service	Number Made	Fleet numbers (Before 1996)	Fleet numbers (After 1996)	Notes
DK1		CRRC Changchun Railway Vehicles	1967	—N/a	2	001–002	—N/a	Test train, not for revenue service.
DK2		CRRC Changchun Railway Vehicles	1969–1970	1969–1985	80	201–219	—N/a	76 cars were refurbished into DK11.
DK3/3G		CRRC Changchun Railway Vehicles	1971–1973	1971-2002	50	Unknown	G101–G107	Transferred to line 13 and Batong line.
DK8		CRRC Changchun Railway Vehicles	1982	Unknown	52	401–413	—N/a	Transferred to line 2.
DK11		CRRC Changchun Railway Vehicles	1984–1985	1984–2008	76	601–619	G201–G207, G2082–G2085, G209–G213	
DK20/20G		CRRC Changchun Railway Vehicles	1994–1995	1994–2012	42	443–449	G108–G114	Originally retired in 2008, reactivated due to DKZ4 trains being overhauled.
BD1		Beijing Subway Rolling Stock Equipment	1990–1992	1990–1994	18	3083–3084, 309–311	—N/a	Transferred to line 2.
BD2/2G		Beijing Subway Rolling Stock Equipment	1994–1998	1995–2012	72	450–454 (first batch only)	G115–G126	Originally retired in 2008, reactivated due to DKZ4 trains being overhauled.
BD3		Beijing Subway Rolling Stock Equipment	1995	1996–2001	2	—N/a	G2081, G2086	Coupled with DK11 cars G2082–G2085.

== See also ==
- Restricted stations of Line 1, Beijing Subway
