= Nanlishi Lu station =

Beijing Subway station

Nanlishi Lu 南礼士路
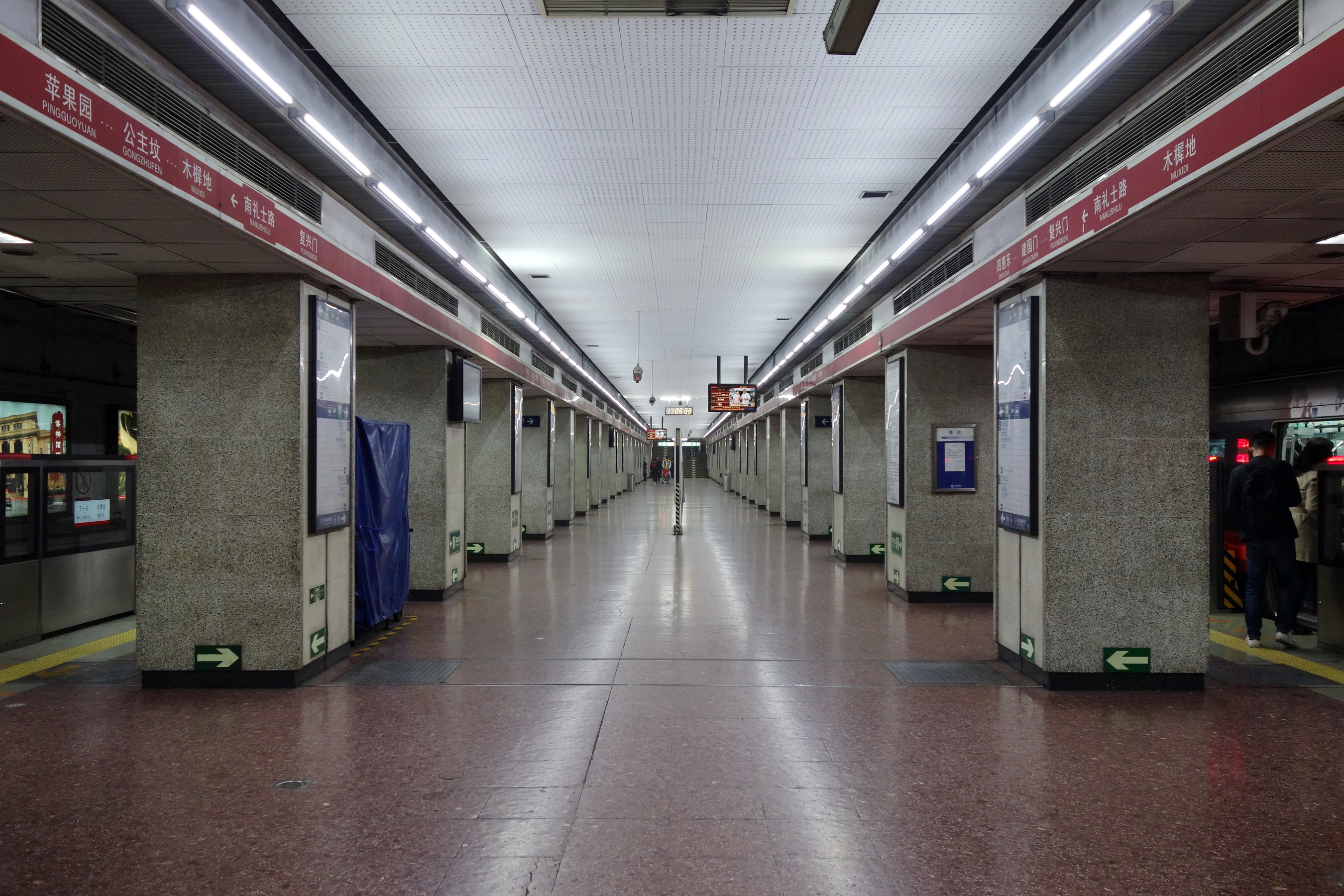
- Platform

General information
- Location: Fuxingmen Outer Street and Nanlishi Road; Xicheng District, Beijing; China
- Coordinates: 39°54′26″N 116°21′09″E
- Operator: Beijing Mass Transit Railway Operation Corporation Limited
- Line: Line 1
- Platforms: 2 (1 island platform)
- Tracks: 2

Construction
- Structure type: Underground
- Accessible: Yes

Other information
- Station code: 113

History
- Opened: January 15, 1971; 55 years ago

Services
| Preceding station | Beijing Subway | Following station |
|---|---|---|
| Muxidi towards Pingguoyuan | Line 1 | Fuxingmen towards Universal Resort |
Location
- Location within Beijing

Nanlishi Lu Station (simplified Chinese: 南礼士路站; traditional Chinese: 南禮士路站; pinyin: Nánlǐshì Lù Zhàn) is a station on Line 1 of the Beijing Subway.

== Station layout ==
The station has an underground island platform.

== Exits ==
There are 5 exits, lettered A, B, C, D1, and D2. Exit C is accessible.
