= Tian'anmendong station =

Beijing Subway station

Coordinates: 39°54′28″N 116°24′04″E

Tian'anmendong 天安门东
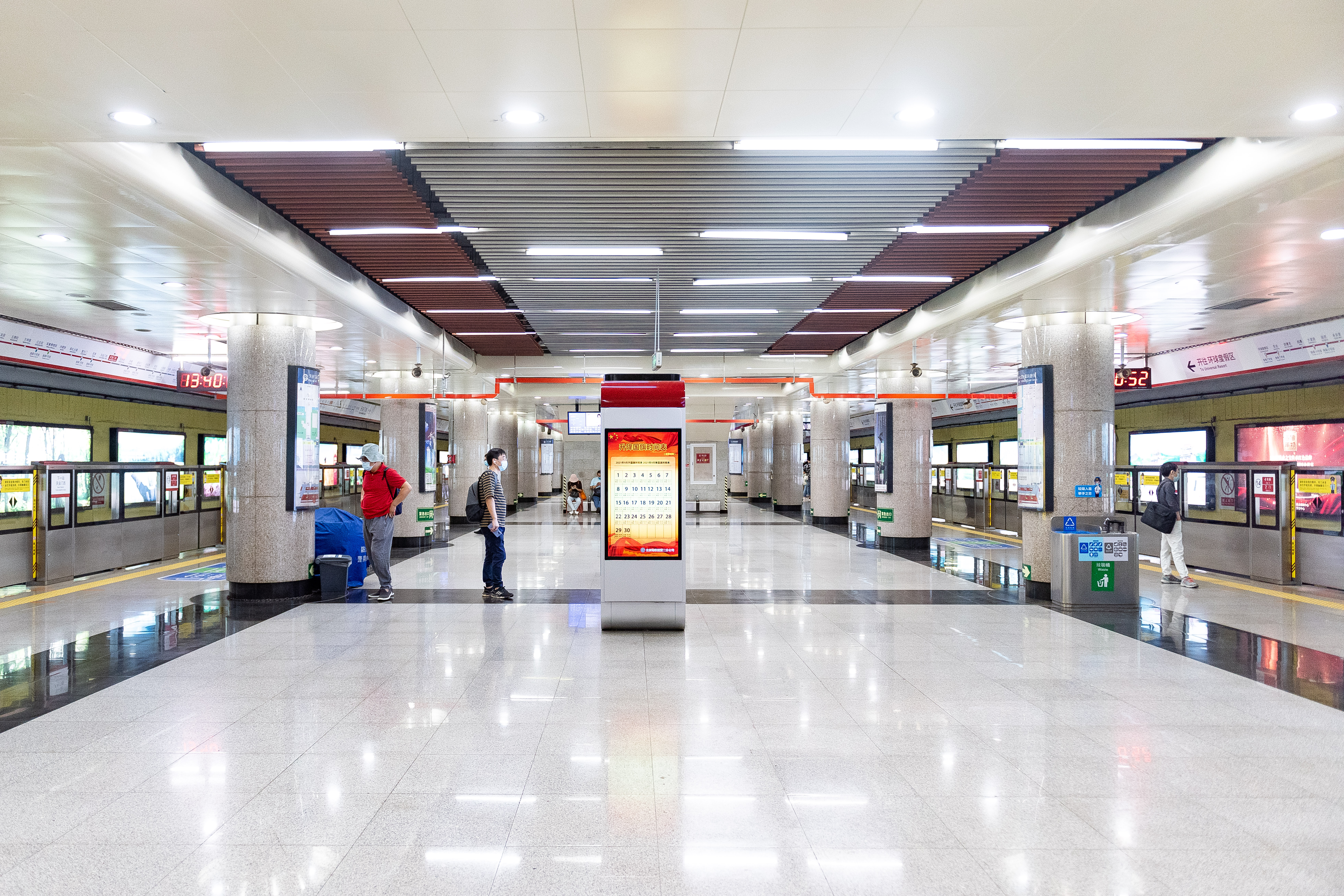
- Platform in September 2021 after the eastern terminus changed to Universal Resort

General information
- Location: East Chang'an Avenue; Dongcheng District, Beijing; China
- Operator: Beijing Mass Transit Railway Operation Corporation Limited
- Line: Line 1
- Platforms: 2 (1 island platform)
- Tracks: 2

Construction
- Structure type: Underground
- Accessible: Yes

Other information
- Station code: 117

History
- Opened: September 28, 1999

Services
Preceding station	Beijing Subway	Following station
Tian'anmenxi towards Pingguoyuan	Line 1	Wangfujing towards Universal Resort
Location
- Location within Beijing

Tian'anmendong (simplified Chinese: 天安门东站; traditional Chinese: 天安門東站; pinyin: Tiān'ānmén Dōng Zhàn) is a station on Line 1 of the Beijing Subway. It provides the most direct access to many Beijing tourist sites, including Tiananmen Square, the Forbidden City, and the National Museum of China.

== Location ==
The station is located on the eastern side of Tian'anmen Square and next to the north entrance of the National Museum of China. During major events hosted on the square itself, Tian'anmenxi and Qianmen are occasionally closed in conjunction with this station.

== Station layout ==
The station has an underground island platform.

== Exits ==
There are four exits, lettered A, B, C, and D. Exit B is accessible.
