= Xidiaoyutai station =

Beijing Subway station

Xidiaoyutai 西钓鱼台
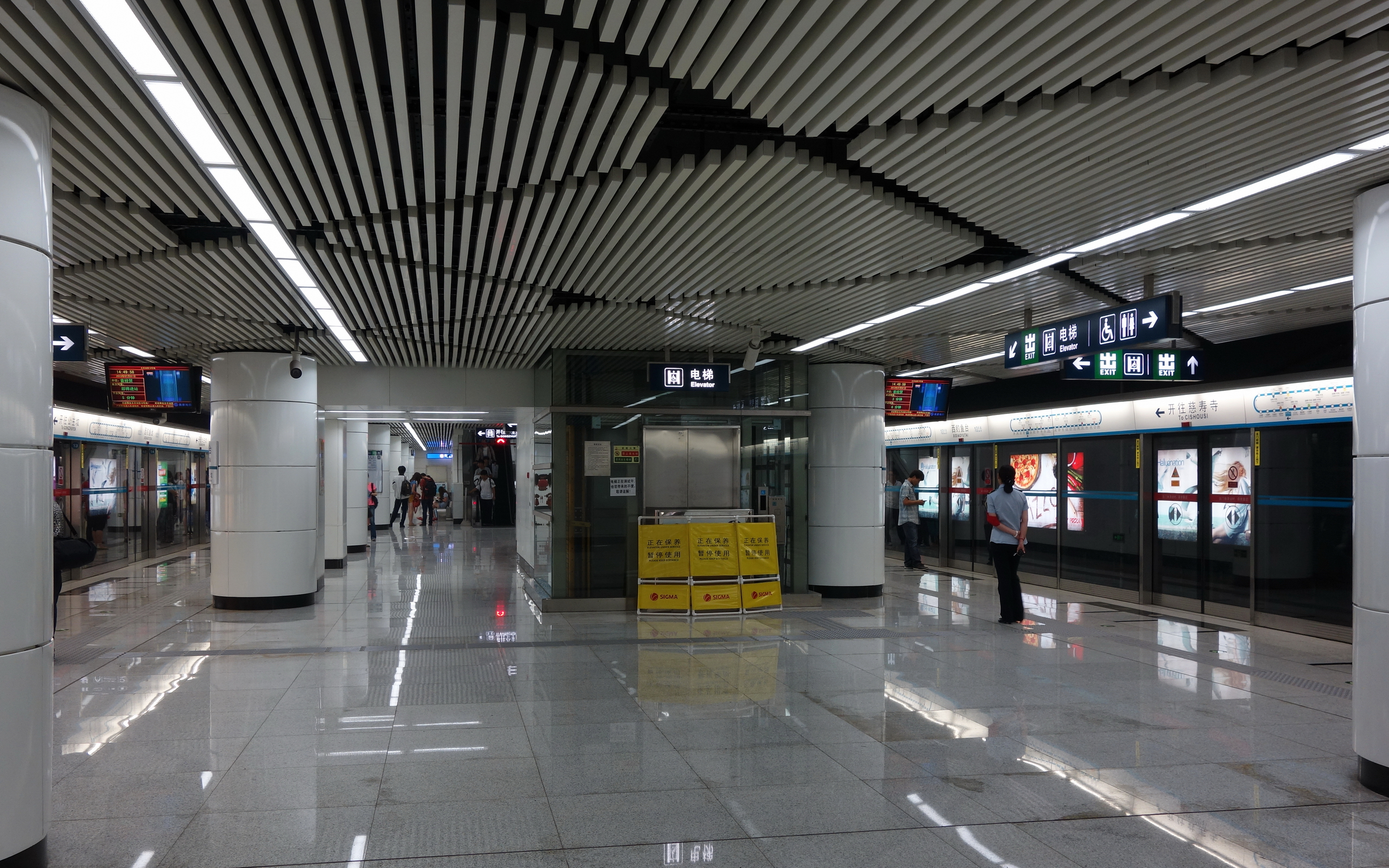
- Platform

General information
- Location: Landianchang South Road (蓝靛厂南路) and Fucheng Road; Haidian District, Beijing; China
- Coordinates: 39.9240°N 116.3001°E
- Operator: Beijing Mass Transit Railway Operation Corporation Limited
- Line: Line 10
- Platforms: 2 (1 island platform)
- Tracks: 2

Construction
- Structure type: Underground
- Accessible: Yes

History
- Opened: December 30, 2012; 13 years ago

Services
Preceding station	Beijing Subway	Following station
Gongzhufen outer loop / anticlockwise	Line 10	Cishou Si inner loop / clockwise
Location
- Location within Beijing

Xidiaoyutai station (simplified Chinese: 西钓鱼台站; traditional Chinese: 西釣魚台站; pinyin: Xīdiàoyútái Zhàn) is a station on Line 10 of the Beijing Subway. This station opened on December 30, 2012.

== Station layout ==
The station has an underground island platform.

== Exits ==
There are 2 exits, lettered A and C. Exit A is accessible.

== Gallery ==
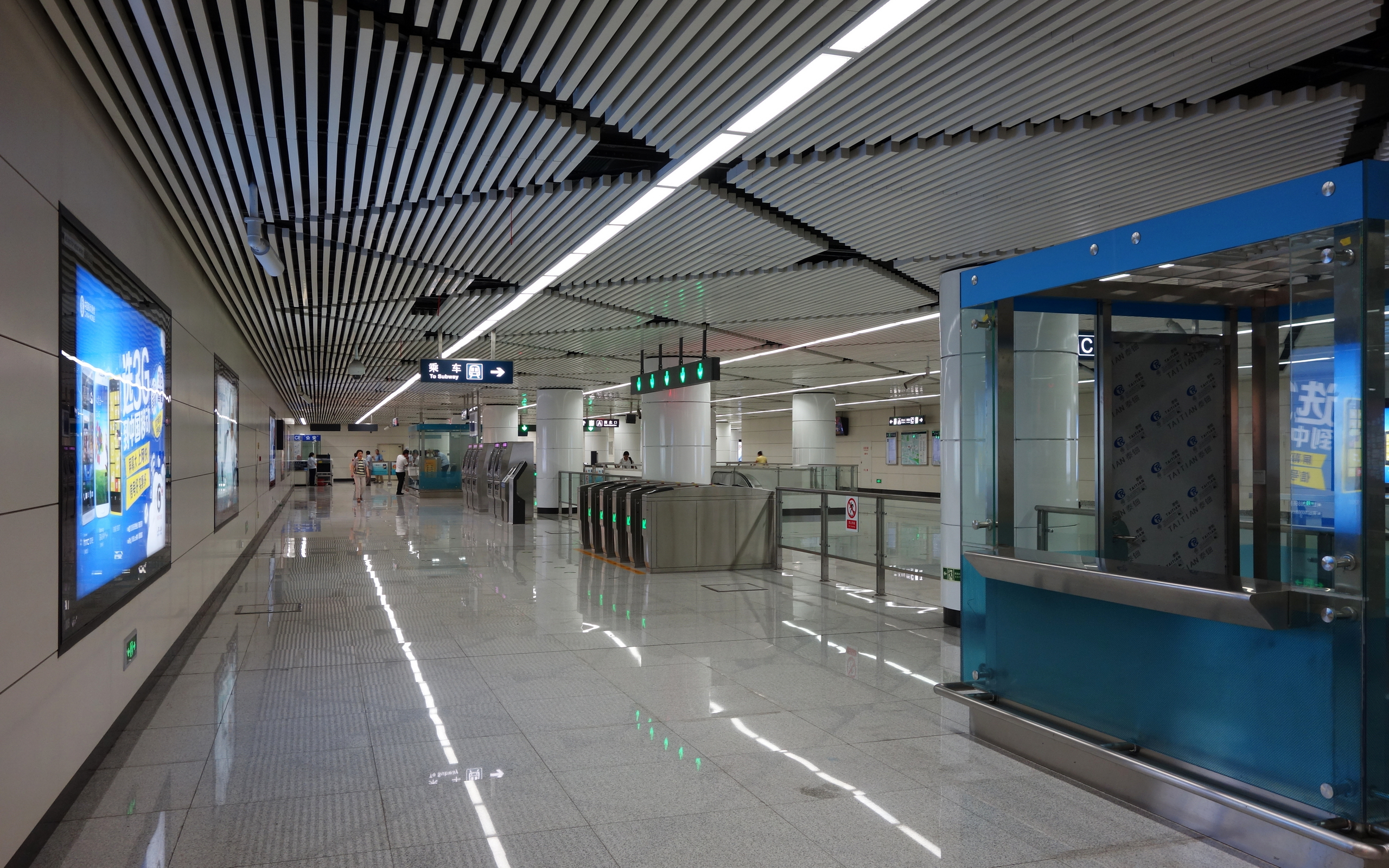
Station Hall

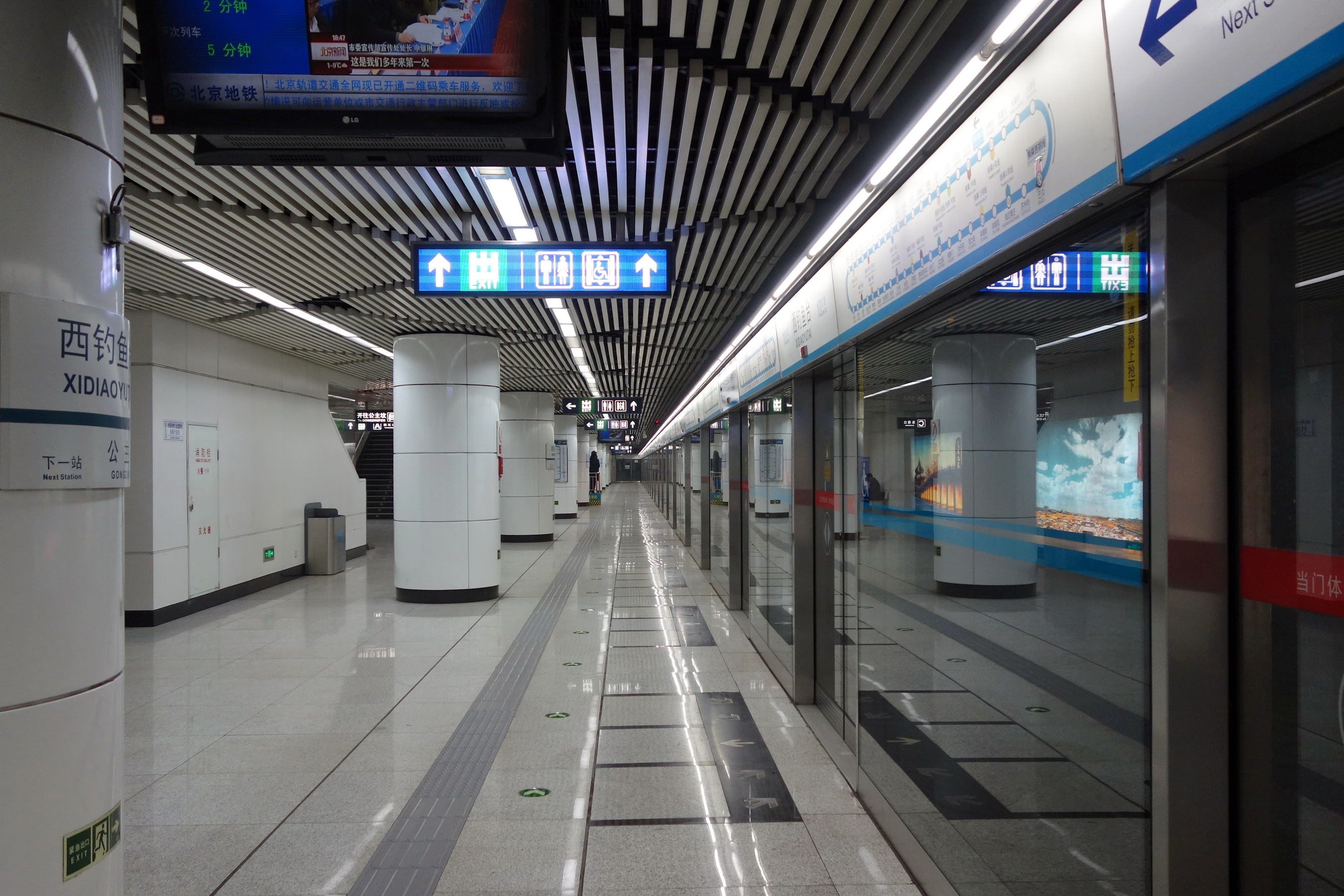
Station Platform

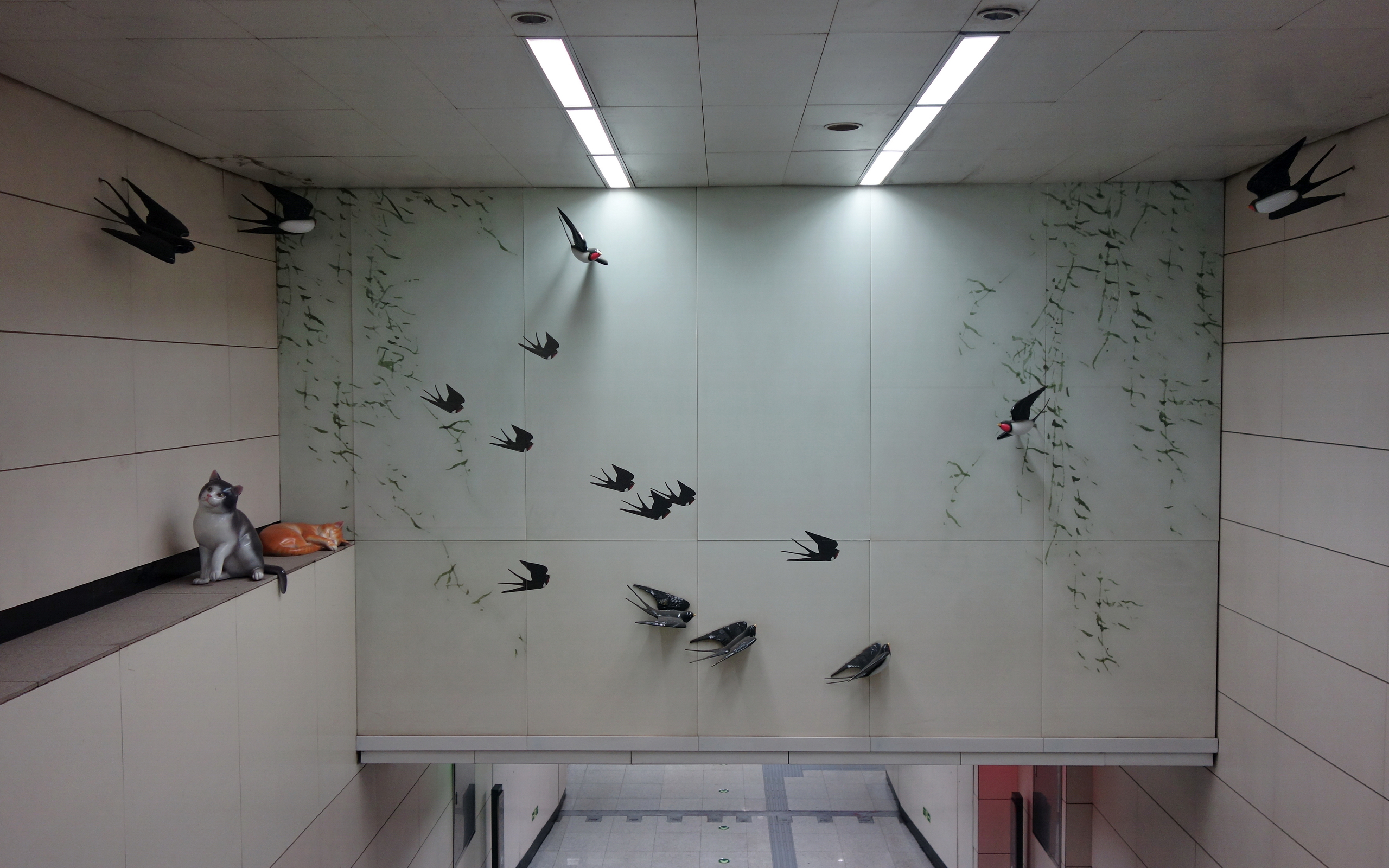
Station Platform
