= Fushouling station =

Metro station under renovation in Beijing, China

Fushouling 福寿岭
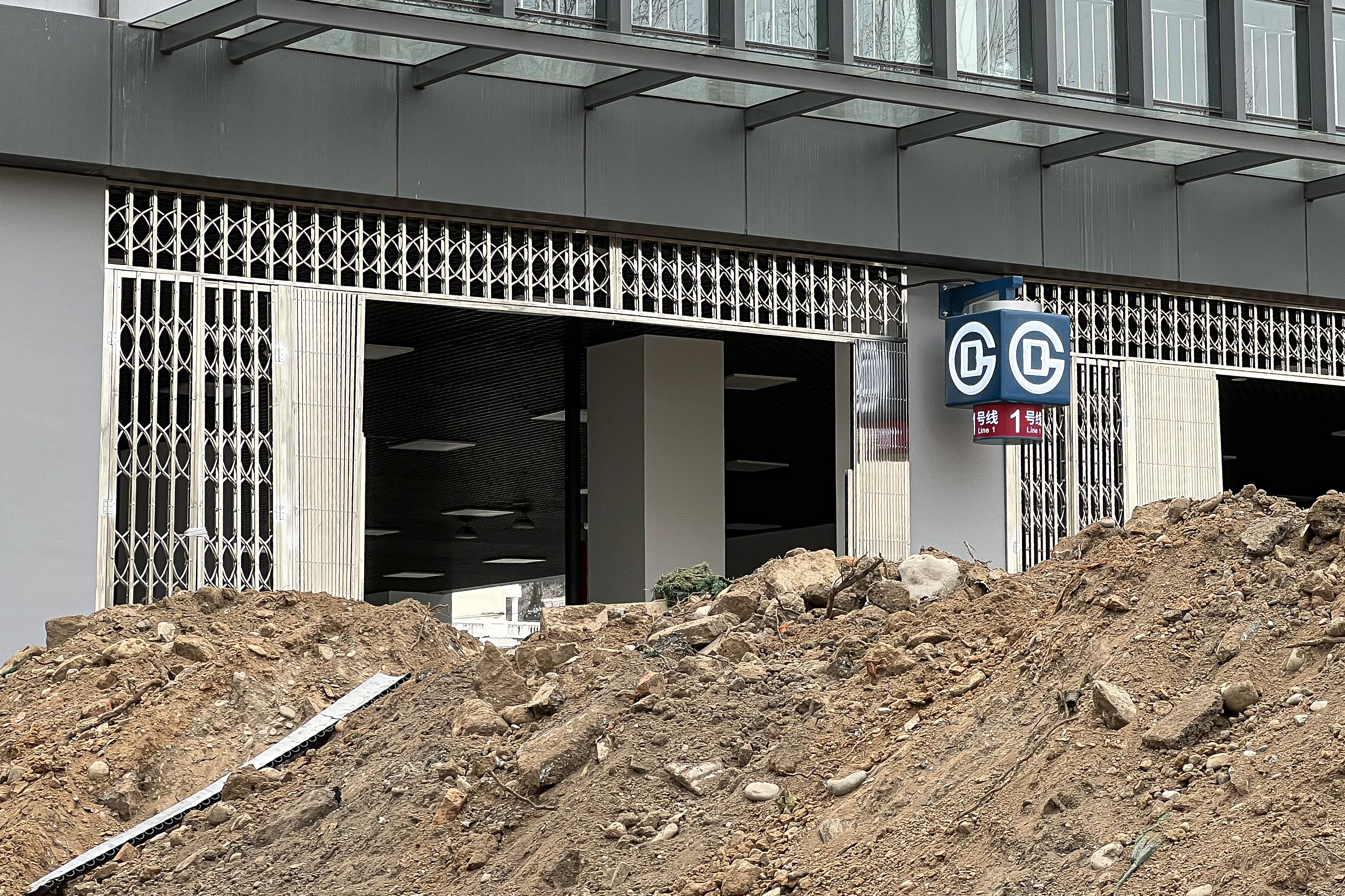
- Construction site in December 2023

General information
- Other names: Sanatorium station (疗养院站); Station 52
- Location: Southwest of the intersection of Fushouling South Road and Jindingshan Road; Shijingshan District, Beijing; China
- Coordinates: 39°56′19″N 116°09′56″E
- Operator: Beijing Mass Transit Railway Operation Corporation Limited
- Line: Line 1
- Platforms: 2 (2 side platforms)
- Tracks: 2

Construction
- Structure type: Underground
- Accessible: Yes

Other information
- Station code: 102

History
- Opening: To be determined
Location
- Location within Beijing

Fushouling station (Chinese: 福寿岭站; pinyin: Fúshòulǐng zhàn) is a station under renovation on Line 1 of the Beijing Subway.

== History ==
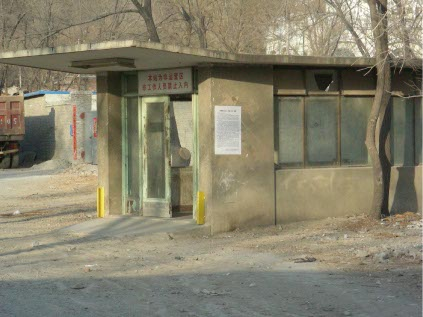
Entrance before 2008

Before May 28, 2007, two Line 1 trains stopped by this station each day to allow students and workers of the metro technical school nearby to alight; one stopped in the morning and one stopped in the evening. The station is served by several public bus routes, some of which bypass Pingguoyuan station. Of the four entrances/exits, only one was readily accessible until the station's full closure; the other three entrances/exits were sealed with cement long ago, and the remaining entrance was locked behind a metal gate. Since the station's full closure, trains no longer stop at the station; however, some trains pass by the station to reverse by traveling through a balloon loop west of the station.

=== Renovation ===
Renovation of the station began on 25 November 2021. It was officially named Fushouling station on 6 September 2023.
