= Sihui Dong (E) station =

Beijing Subway station

Coordinates: 39.9085°N 116.5157°E

Sihui Dong (E) 四惠东
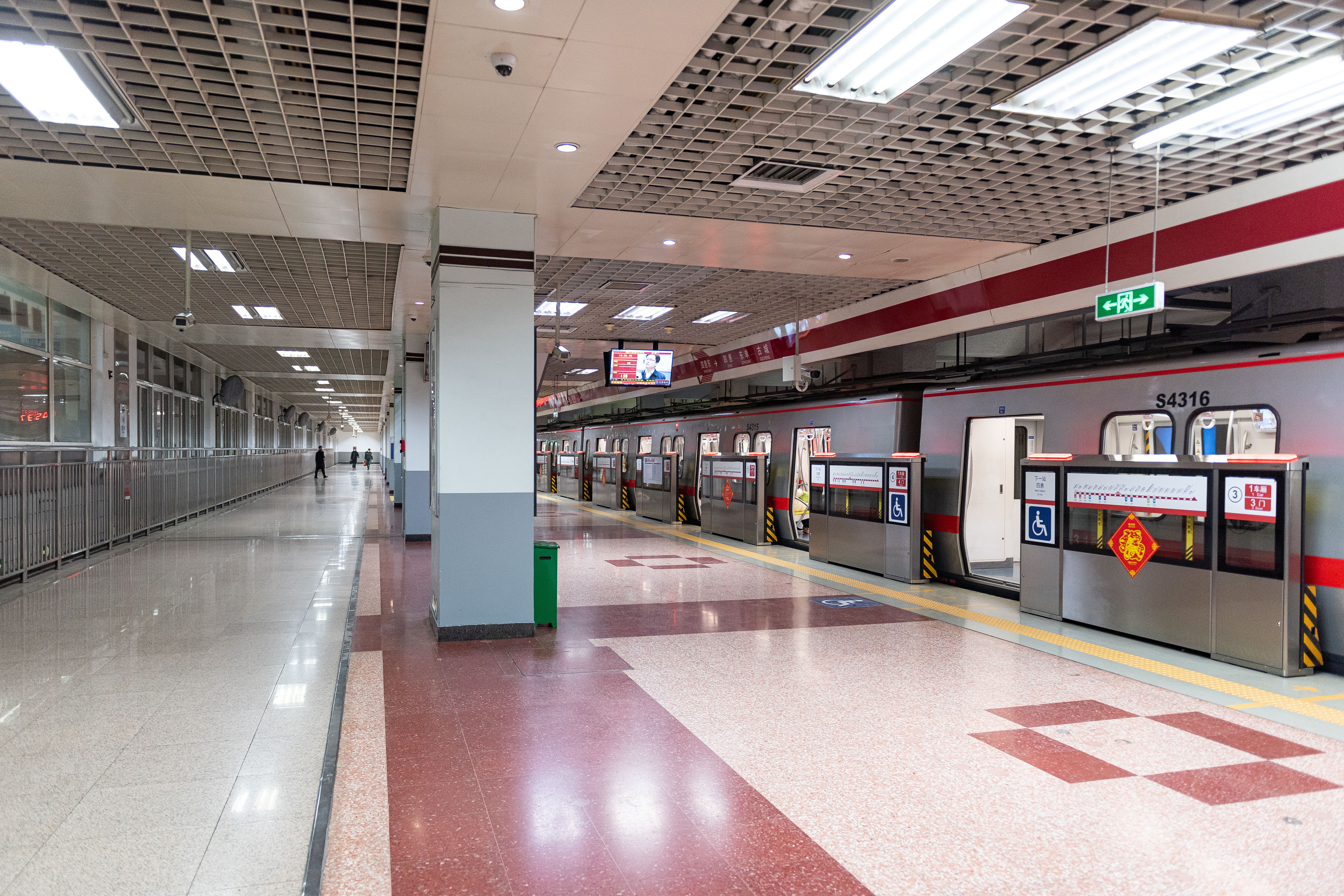
- Line 1 platform (not in use since 29 August 2021)

General information
- Location: Sihui, Chaoyang District, Beijing; China
- Operator: Beijing Mass Transit Railway Operation Corporation Limited
- Line: Line 1
- Platforms: 4 (4 side platforms) (2 in use)
- Tracks: 4 (2 in use)

Construction
- Structure type: At-grade
- Accessible: Yes

History
- Opened: September 28, 1999; 26 years ago (Line 1); December 27, 2003; 22 years ago (Batong line)
- Closed: August 29, 2021; 4 years ago (former Line 1 platform)

Services
| Preceding station | Beijing Subway | Following station |
|---|---|---|
| Sihui towards Pingguoyuan | Line 1 (through operation to Batong Line) | Gaobeidian (Batong Line) towards Universal Resort |
Location

Sihui Dong (E) Station (simplified Chinese: 四惠东站; traditional Chinese: 四惠東站; pinyin: Sìhuì Dōng Zhàn) is a station on Line 1 and the Batong line of the Beijing Subway.

== Station layout ==
The station has two side platforms, each at ground level, serving Line 1 and Batong line. From 29 August 2021, only the Batong line platforms are used.

== Exits ==
There are two exits, lettered A and B. Exit A is accessible.

== Gallery ==
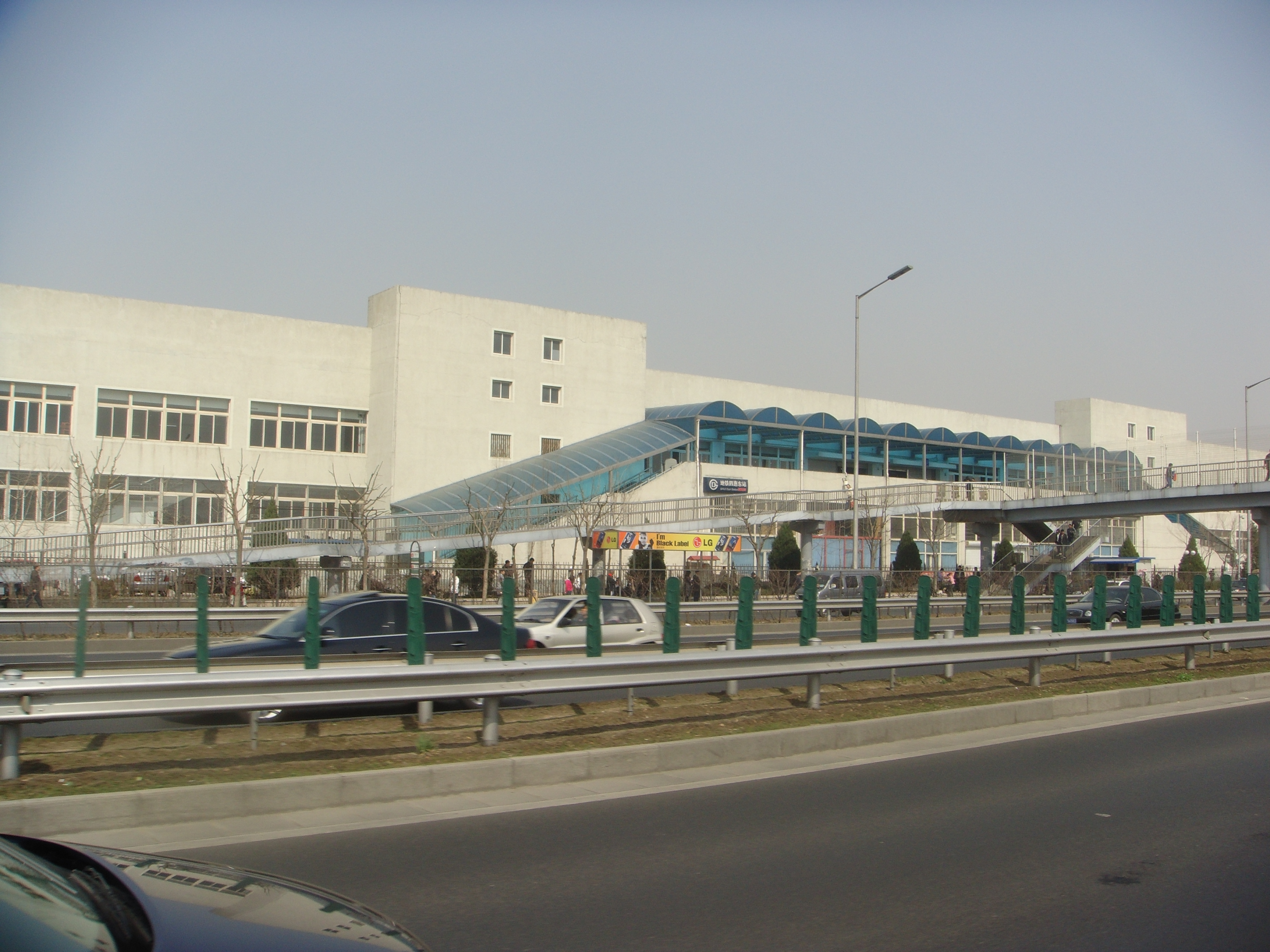
Station exterior

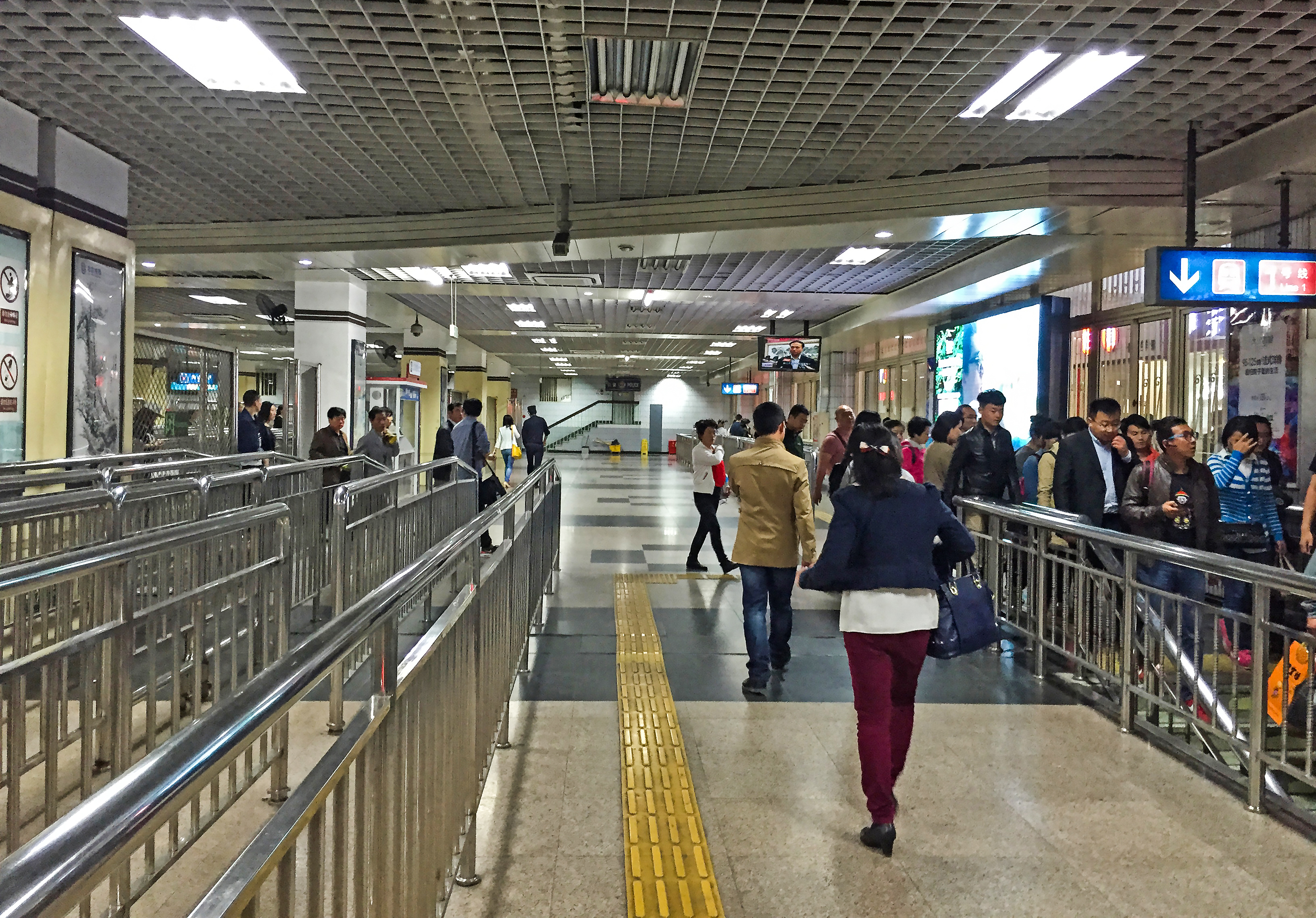
Concourse

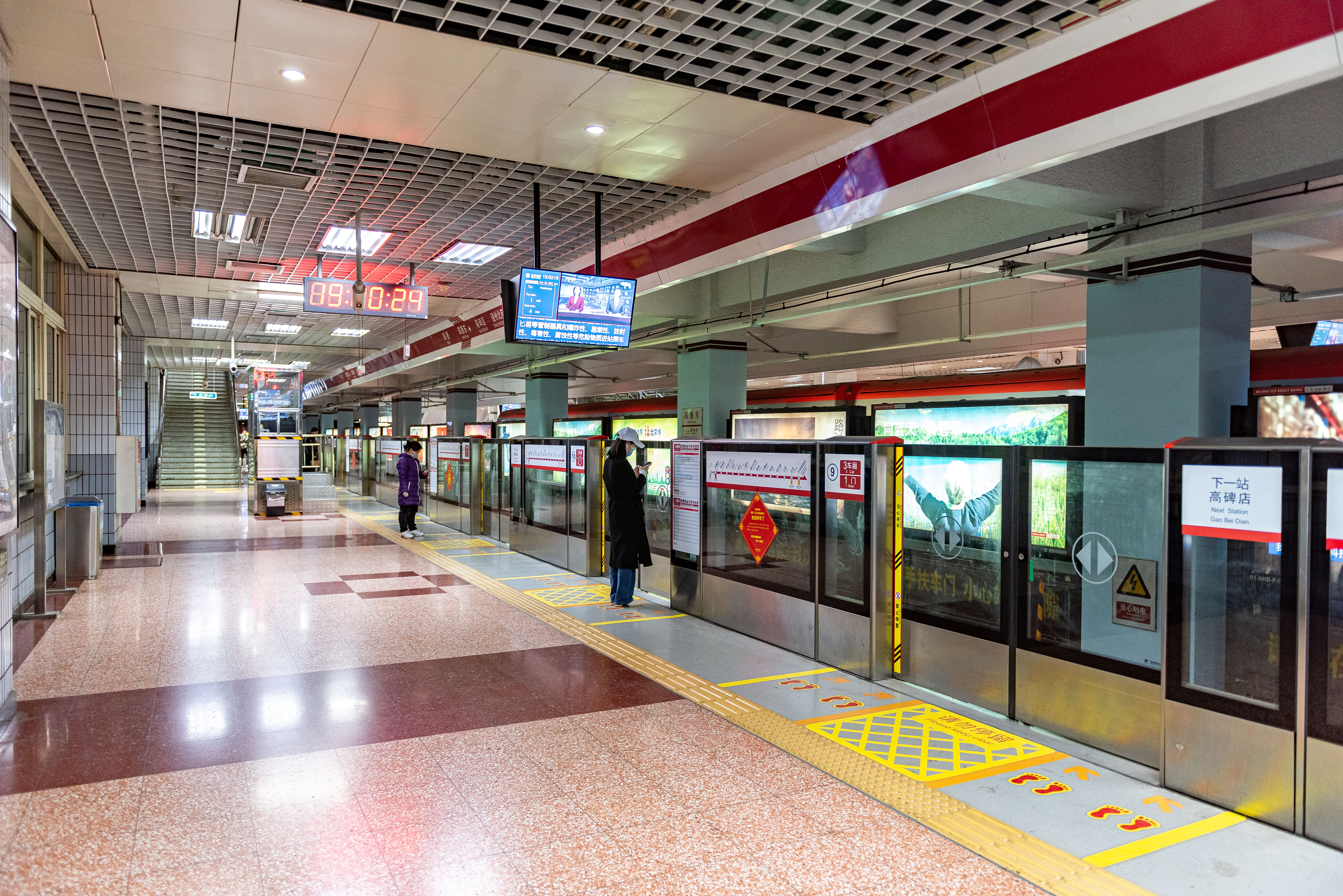
Batong line platform
