= Xuanwumen Station =

Xuanwumen Station may refer to:

- Xuanwumen Station (Beijing) (宣武门站), a station on Lines 2 and 4 of the Beijing Subway
- Xuanwumen Station (Nanjing) (玄武门站), a station on Line 1 of the Nanjing Metro

== See also ==
- Xuanwumen (disambiguation)
