= Xuanwumen =

Xuanwumen or Xuanwu Gate may refer to:

- Xuanwumen (Beijing) (宣武门), a former gate in southern Beijing that was demolished in 1965
- Xuanwu Gate Incident, a coup during the Tang Dynasty in China
- Xuanwumen (玄武门), a gate of Xuanwu Lake as part of the City Wall of Nanjing

== Historical use ==
- Xuanwu Gate (玄武门), the north gate of Taiji Palace (太极宫), Chang'an (now Xi'an), where Xuanwu Gate Incident took place
- Xuanwu Gate (玄武门), the north gate of Daming Palace, Chang'an (now Xi'an)
- Shenwu Gate (神武门), formerly "Xuanwu Gate" (玄武门), name changed in Kangxi Emperor era, Gate of Divine Prowess, the north gate of Forbidden City, Beijing
- Xuanwu Gate (玄武门), The north gate of Ming Palace, Nanjing

== See also ==
- Xuanwumen Station (disambiguation)
