= Xuanwumen (Beijing) =

Coordinates: 39.8997°N 116.3743°E

- Traditional Chinese: 宣武門
- Simplified Chinese: 宣武门
Transcriptions
Standard Mandarin
- Hanyu Pinyin: Xuānwǔmén
- Bopomofo: ㄒㄩㄢ ㄨˇ ㄇㄣˊ
- Wade–Giles: Hsüen^{1}-wu^{3}-mên^{2}
- IPA: [ɕɥɛ́n.ù.mə̌n]
Yue: Cantonese
- Yale Romanization: Syūnmóuhmùhn
- Jyutping: syun1 mou5 mun4
- IPA: [syn˥.mɔw˩˧.mun˩]

Xuanwumen (simplified Chinese: 宣武门; traditional Chinese: 宣武門; pinyin: Xuānwǔmén; lit. 'gate of military might'; Manchu: ᡥᠣᡵᠣᠨ ᠪᡝ ᠠᠯᡤᡳᠮᠪᡠᡵᡝ ᡩᡠᡴᠠ, romanized: horon be algimbure duka; lit. 'gate of the declaration of power') was a gate in Beijing's former city wall. In the 1960s, the gate was torn down during the construction of the city's subway. Today, Xuanwumen is a transport node in Beijing as well as the location of Xuanwumen Station on Line 2 and Line 4 of the Beijing Subway.

== See also ==
- Xuanwu District
