= Fuxingmen station (Beijing Subway) =

Beijing Subway interchange station

Fuxingmen 复兴门
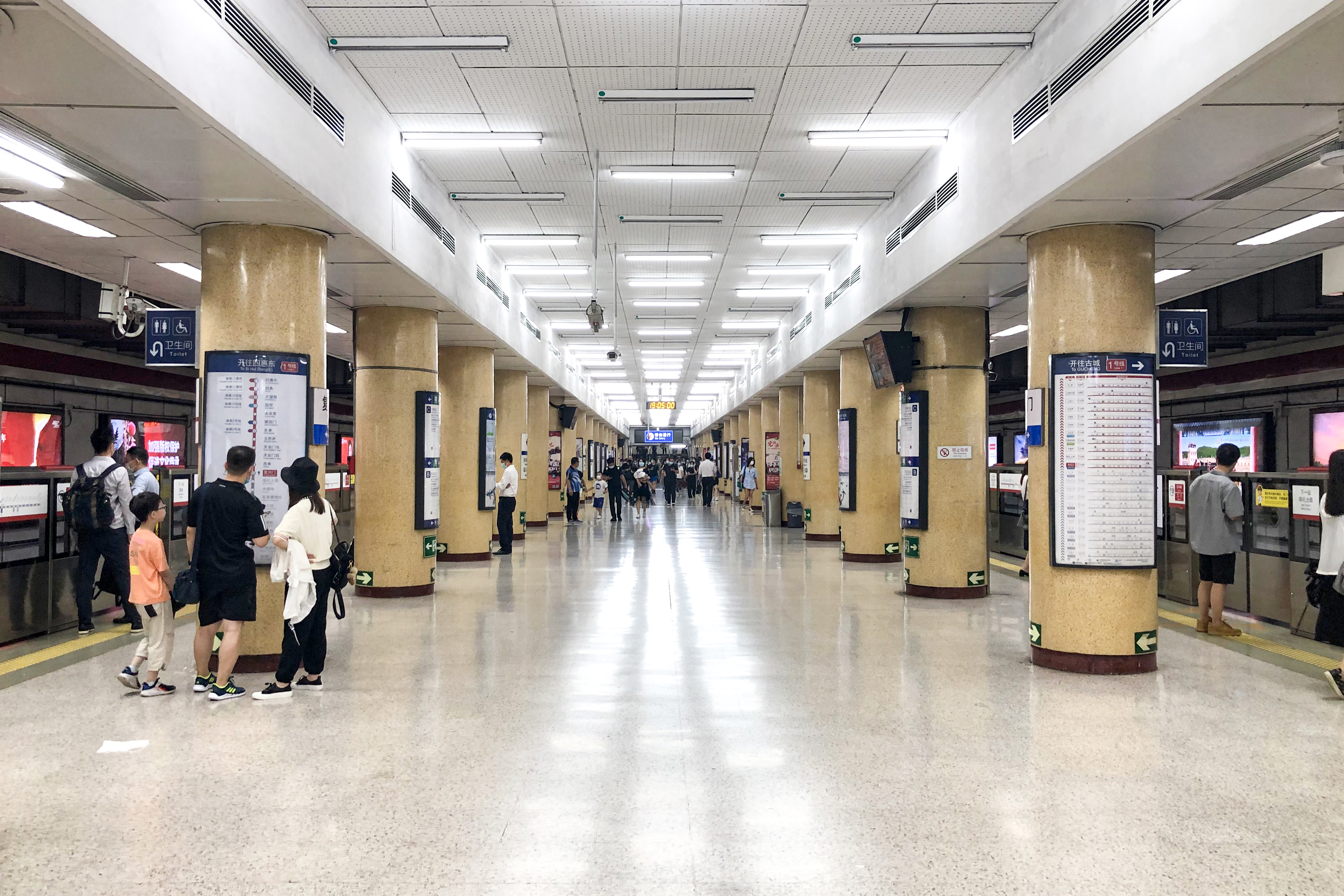
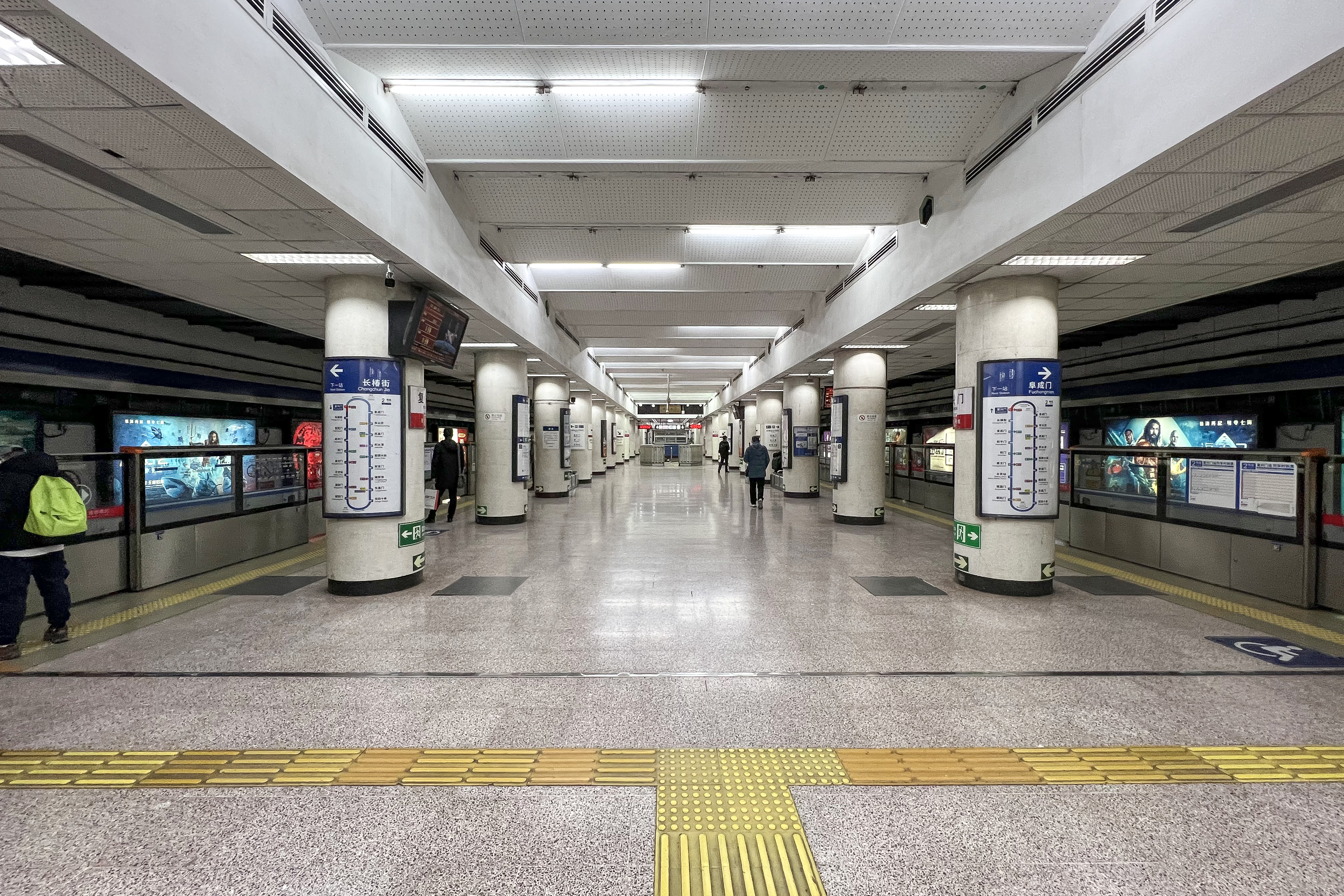
- Line 1 platform Line 2 platform

General information
- Location: Fuxingmen Inner Street; Xicheng District, Beijing; China
- Coordinates: 39°54′26″N 116°21′25″E
- Operator: Beijing Mass Transit Railway Operation Corporation Limited
- Lines: Line 1; Line 2
- Platforms: 4 (2 island platforms)
- Tracks: 4
- Connections: Line 19 (OSI via Taipingqiao)

Construction
- Structure type: Underground
- Accessible: Yes

Other information
- Station code: 114 (Line 1); 204 (Line 2)

History
- Opened: December 28, 1987; 38 years ago (Line 1); September 20, 1984; 41 years ago (Line 2)

Services
Preceding station	Beijing Subway	Following station
Nanlishi Lu towards Pingguoyuan	Line 1	Xidan towards Universal Resort
Changchun Jie outer loop / anticlockwise	Line 2	Fucheng Men inner loop / clockwise
Location
- Location within Beijing

Fuxingmen Station (simplified Chinese: 复兴门站; traditional Chinese: 復興門站; pinyin: Fùxīngmén Zhàn) is an interchange station on Line 1 and Line 2 of the Beijing Subway. It is named for Fuxingmen, a former gate in Beijing's city wall. The station handles over 170,000 transfers between Lines 1 and 2 per day.

== Station layout ==
Both the line 1 and 2 stations have underground island platforms.

== Exits ==
There are four exits, lettered A, B, C, and D. Exits A and C are accessible.

== Gallery ==
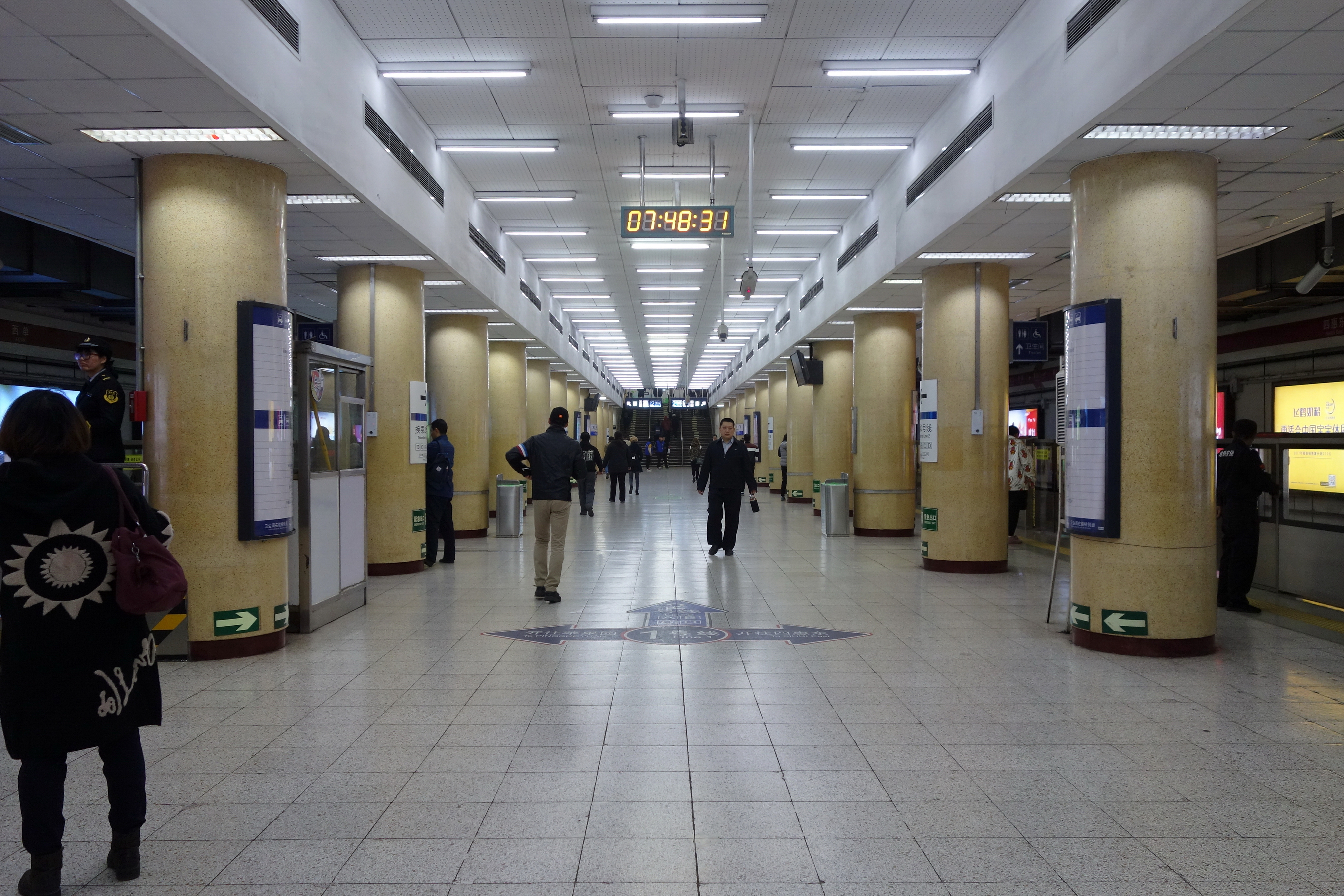
Line 1 platform (November 2018)

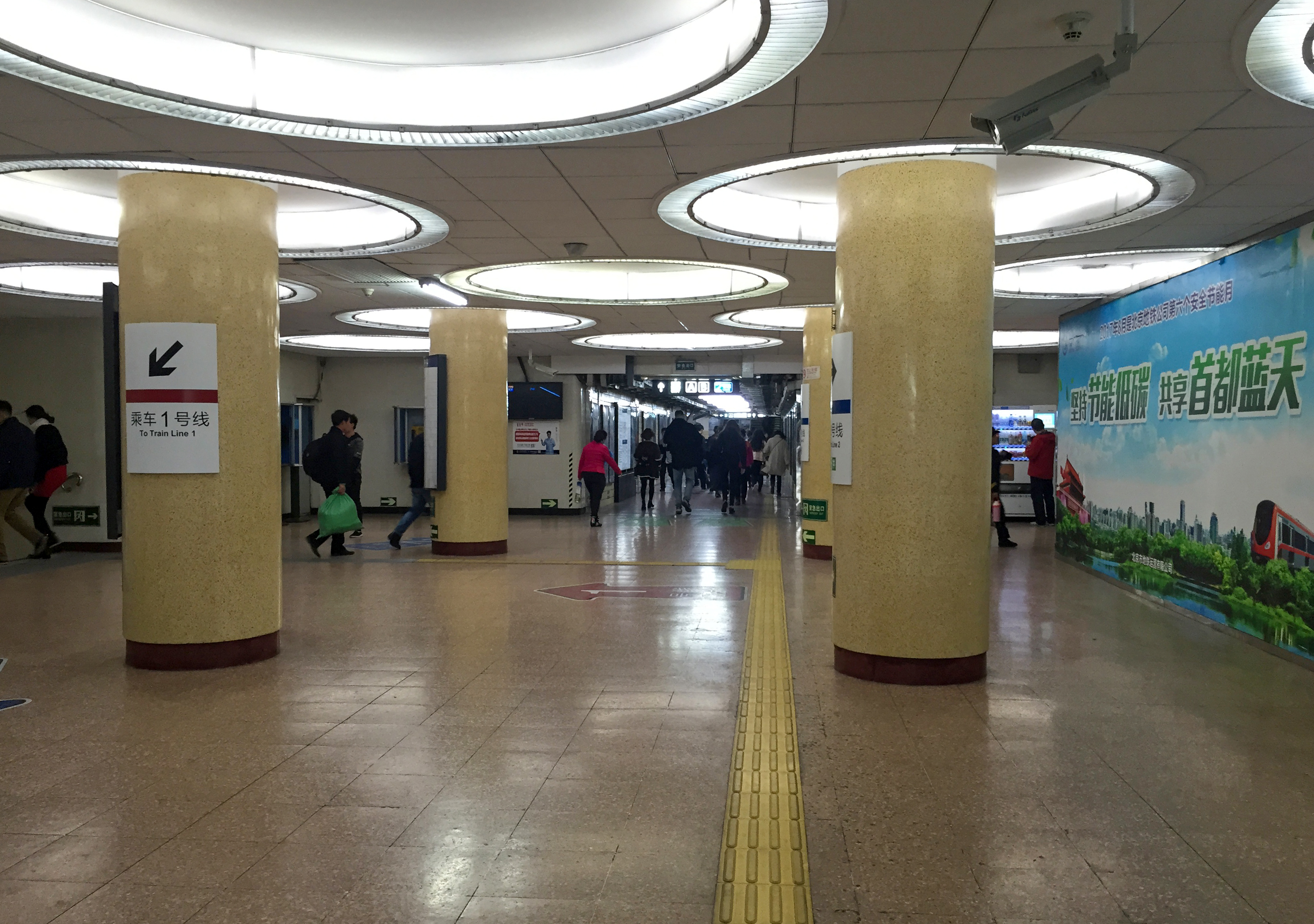
East Concourse

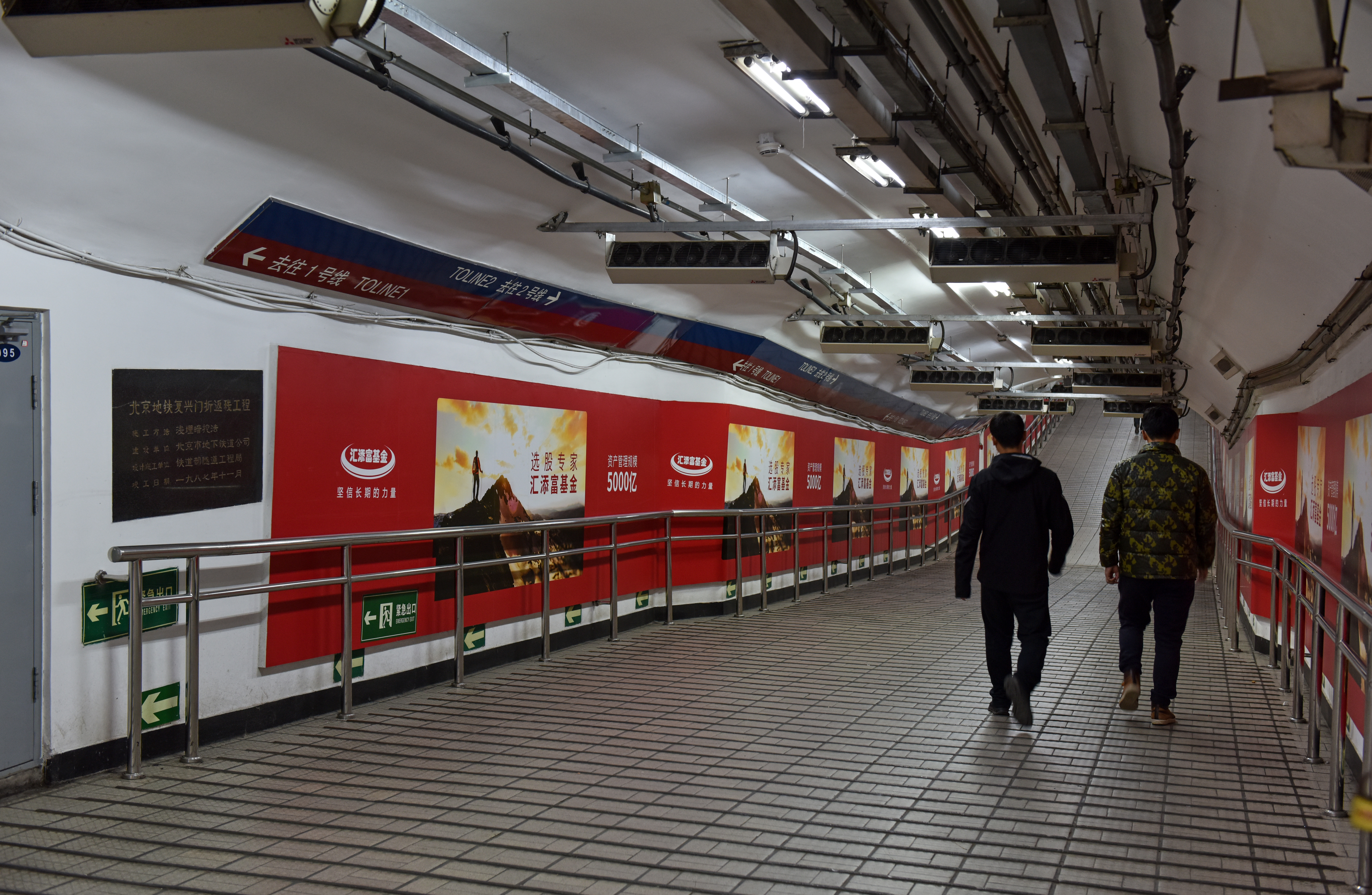
Interchange corridor

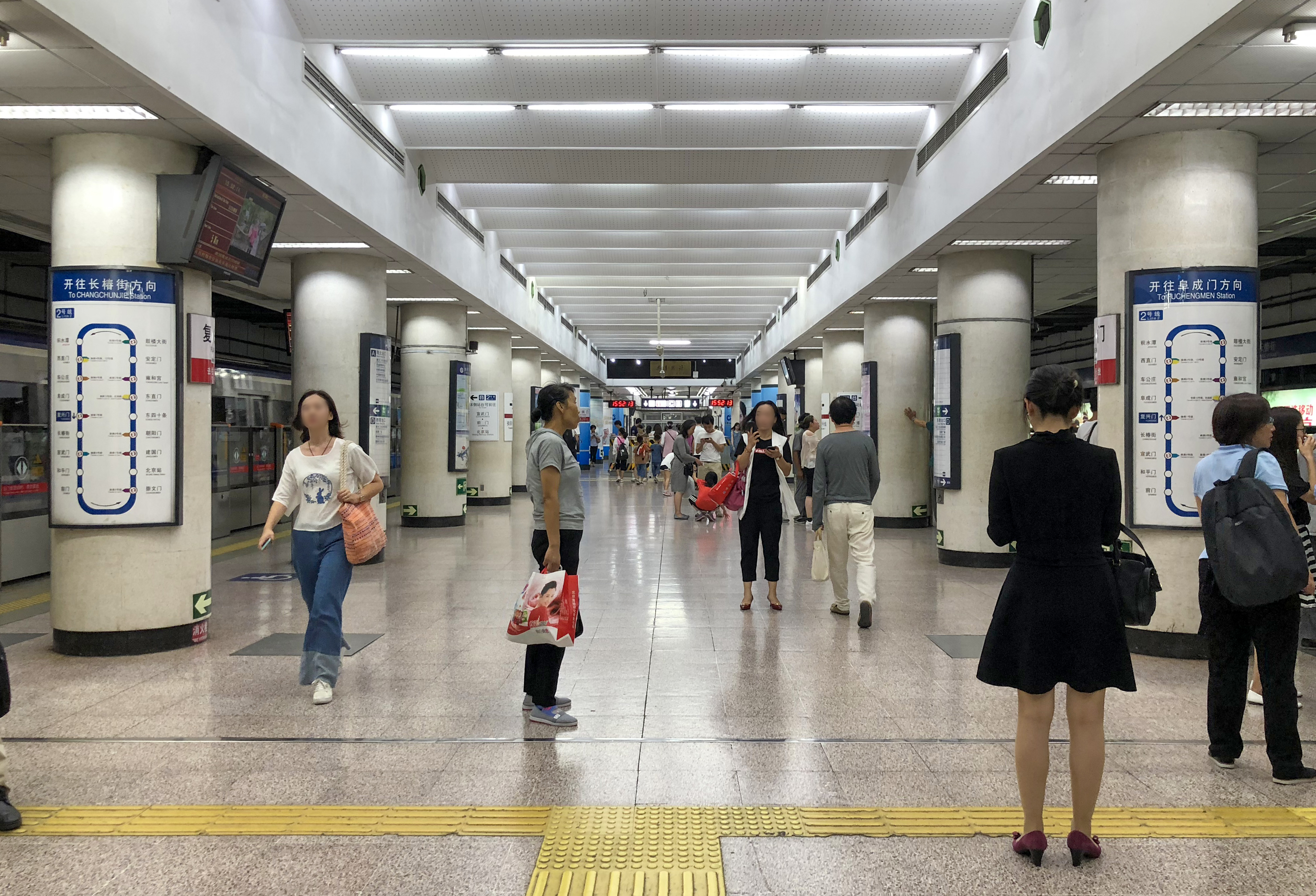
Line 2 platform (August 2018)
