= Fucheng Men station =

Beijing Subway station

Fucheng Men 阜成门
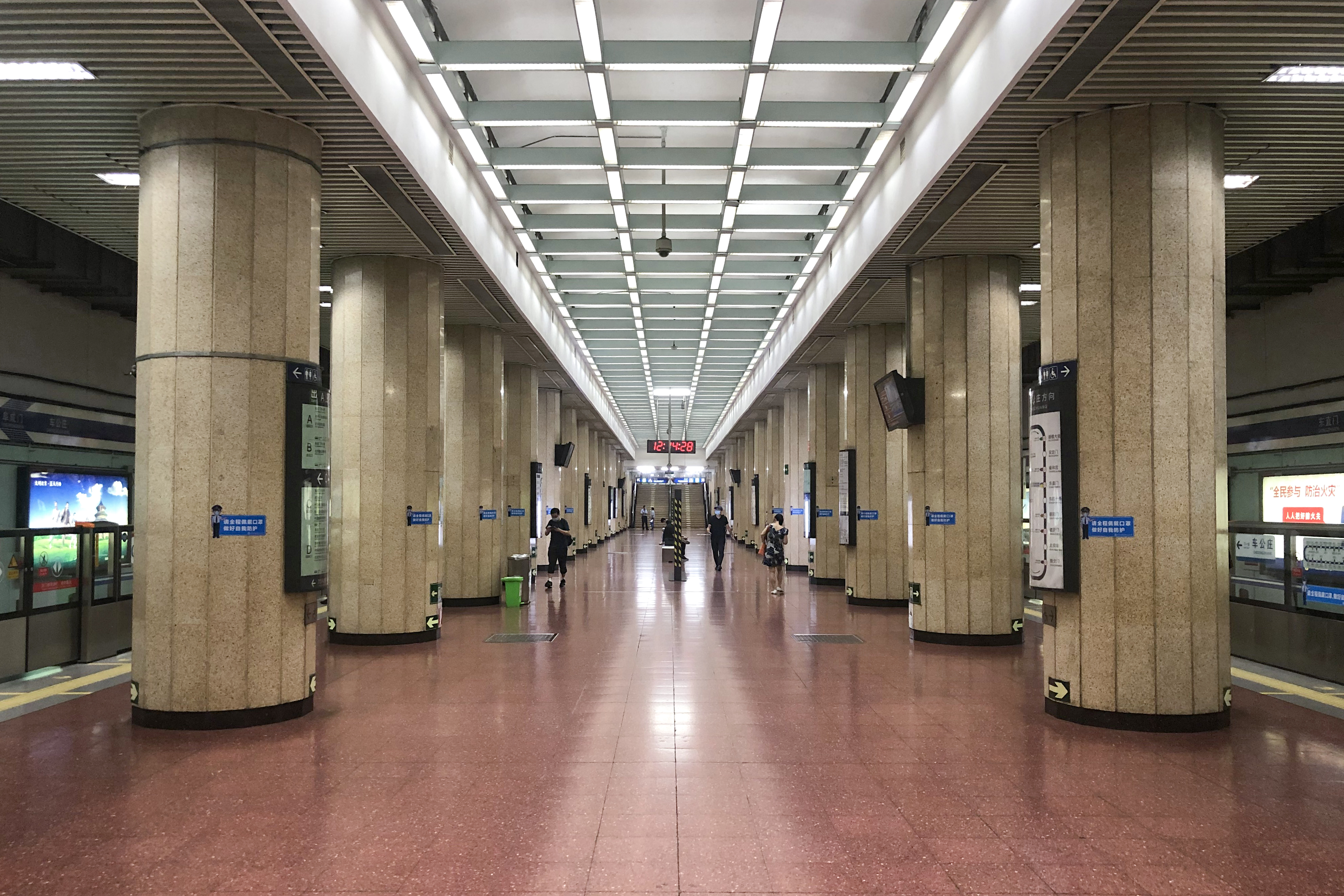
- Platform

General information
- Location: Fuchengmen (West 2nd Ring Road and Fuchengmen Outer Street / Fuchengmen Inner Street); Xicheng District, Beijing; China
- Coordinates: 39.9235°N 116.3560°E
- Operator: Beijing Mass Transit Railway Operation Corporation Limited
- Line: Line 2
- Platforms: 2 (1 island platform)
- Tracks: 2

Construction
- Structure type: Underground
- Accessible: Yes

Other information
- Station code: 203

History
- Opened: September 20, 1984; 41 years ago

Services
Preceding station	Beijing Subway	Following station
Fuxingmen outer loop / anticlockwise	Line 2	Chegongzhuang inner loop / clockwise
Location
- Location within Beijing

Fucheng Men Station (simplified Chinese: 阜成门站; traditional Chinese: 阜成門站; pinyin: Fùchéng Mén Zhàn) is a station on Line 2 of the Beijing Subway.

== Station layout ==
The station has an underground island platform.

== Exits ==
There are 4 exits, lettered A, B, C, and D. Exit C is accessible.
