= Fayuan Mosque =

Mosque in Xicheng, Beijing, China

- 法源清真寺
- Location of the mosque in Beijing

Religion
- Affiliation: Sunni Islam
- Ecclesiastical or organizational status: Mosque
- Status: Active

Location
- Location: Xicheng, Beijing
- Country: China
- Interactive map of Fayuan Mosque
- Coordinates: 39°57′7.2″N 116°22′48.8″E

Architecture
- Type: Mosque
- Style: Chinese; Islamic
- Completed: c. 17th century

Specifications
- Capacity: 300 worshipers
- Site area: 4,000 m^{2} (43,000 sq ft)

The Fayuan Mosque (Chinese: 法源清真寺; pinyin: Fǎyuán Qīngzhēnsì), also known as Dewai Mosque or Dewai Guanxiang Mosque, is a mosque in Xicheng District, Beijing, China.

== History ==
The mosque was constructed during the late Ming Dynasty. In 2003, the mosque underwent renovation which costed CN¥8 million, funded by Xicheng District Government; and was then officially reopened to the public in September 2007.

== Architecture ==
The mosque has a capacity of 300 worshipers located on a 4,000-square-metre (43,000 sq ft) site. It was designed with a mixture of Chinese and Islamic architecture.

== Transportation ==
The mosque is accessible within walking distance northeast of Jishuitan Station of Beijing Subway.

== See also ==
- Islam in China
- List of mosques in China
