= Jishuitan station =

Beijing Subway station

Coordinates: 39.948653°N 116.373126°E

Jishuitan 积水潭
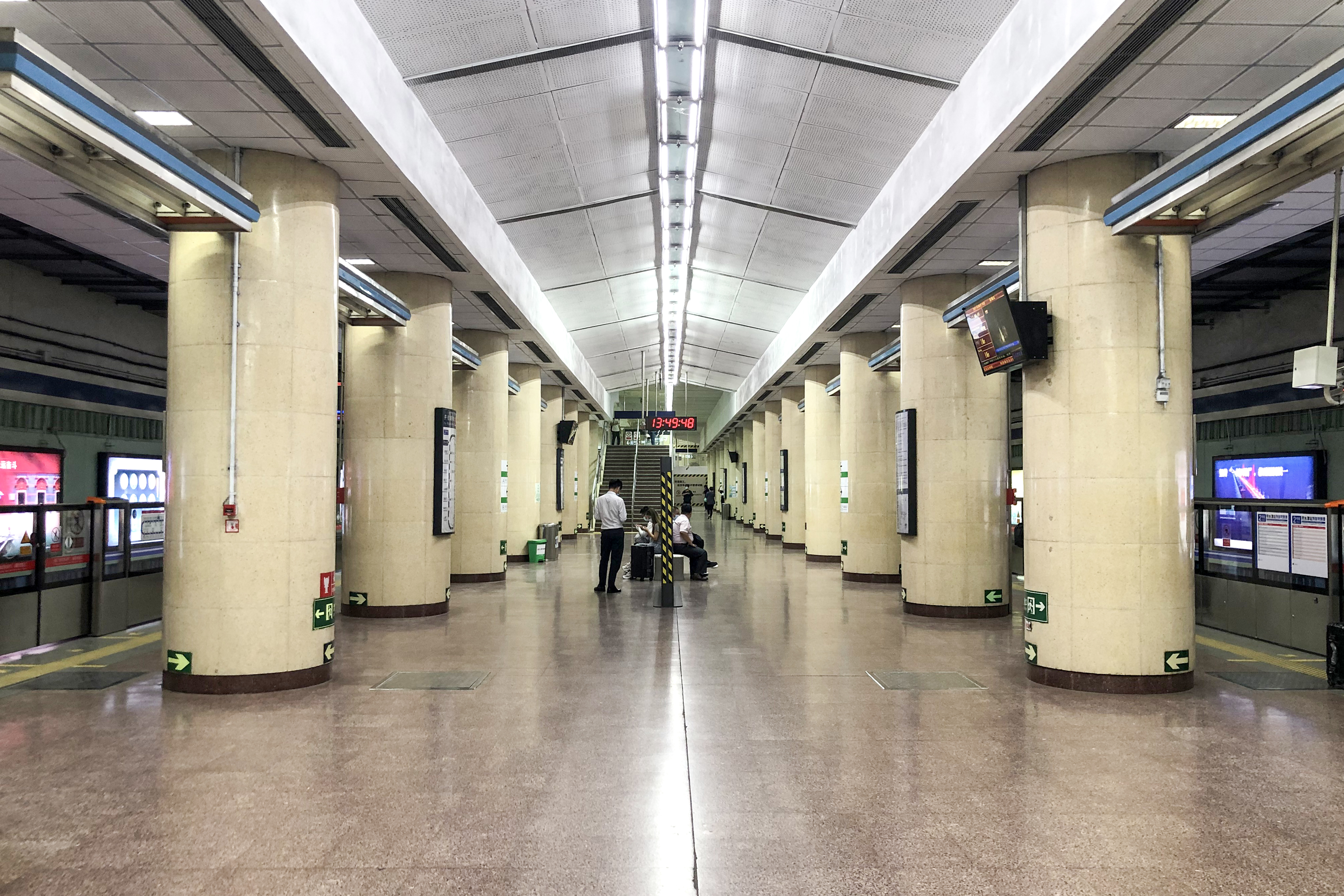
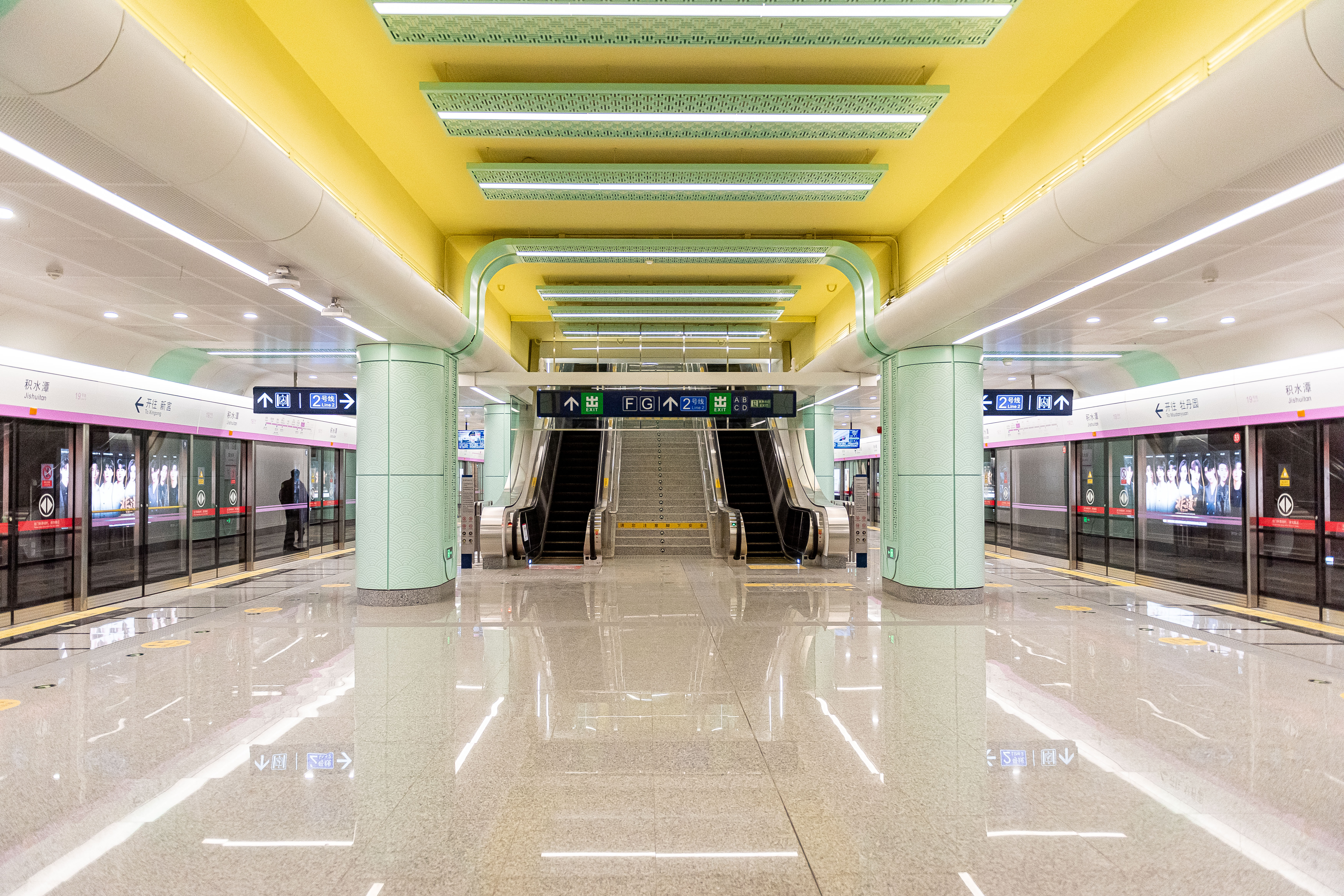
- Line 2 platform Line 19 platform

General information
- Location: North 2nd Ring Road and Xinjiekou Outer Street / Xinjiekou North Street; Xicheng District, Beijing; China
- Operator: Beijing Mass Transit Railway Operation Corporation Limited (Line 2); Beijing Metro Operation Administration (BJMOA) Corporation Limited (Line 19)
- Lines: Line 2 Line 19
- Platforms: 4 (2 island platforms)
- Tracks: 4

Construction
- Structure type: Underground
- Accessible: Yes

Other information
- Station code: 218 (Line 2)

History
- Opened: September 20, 1984; 41 years ago (Line 2); December 31, 2021; 4 years ago (Line 19)

Services
Preceding station	Beijing Subway	Following station
Xizhimen outer loop / anticlockwise	Line 2	Gulou Dajie inner loop / clockwise
Beitaipingzhuang towards Mudanyuan	Line 19	Ping'anli towards Xingong
Location
- Location within Beijing

Jishuitan station (Chinese: 积水潭站; pinyin: Jīshuǐtán Zhàn) is a station on Line 2 and Line 19 of the Beijing Subway.

== History ==
The station for Line 2 opened on September 20, 1984. It was closed for renovation (in order to interchange with Line 19) on April 10, 2021, and reopened on June 18, 2021. The station for Line 19 opened on December 31, 2021.

== Around the station ==
- Deshengmen bus terminal
- Fayuan Mosque

== Station layout ==
The station has underground island platforms for both line 2 and line 19.

== Exits ==
There are 7 exits, lettered A, B1, B2, C, D, F and G1. Exits B, C and F are accessible.

== Gallery ==
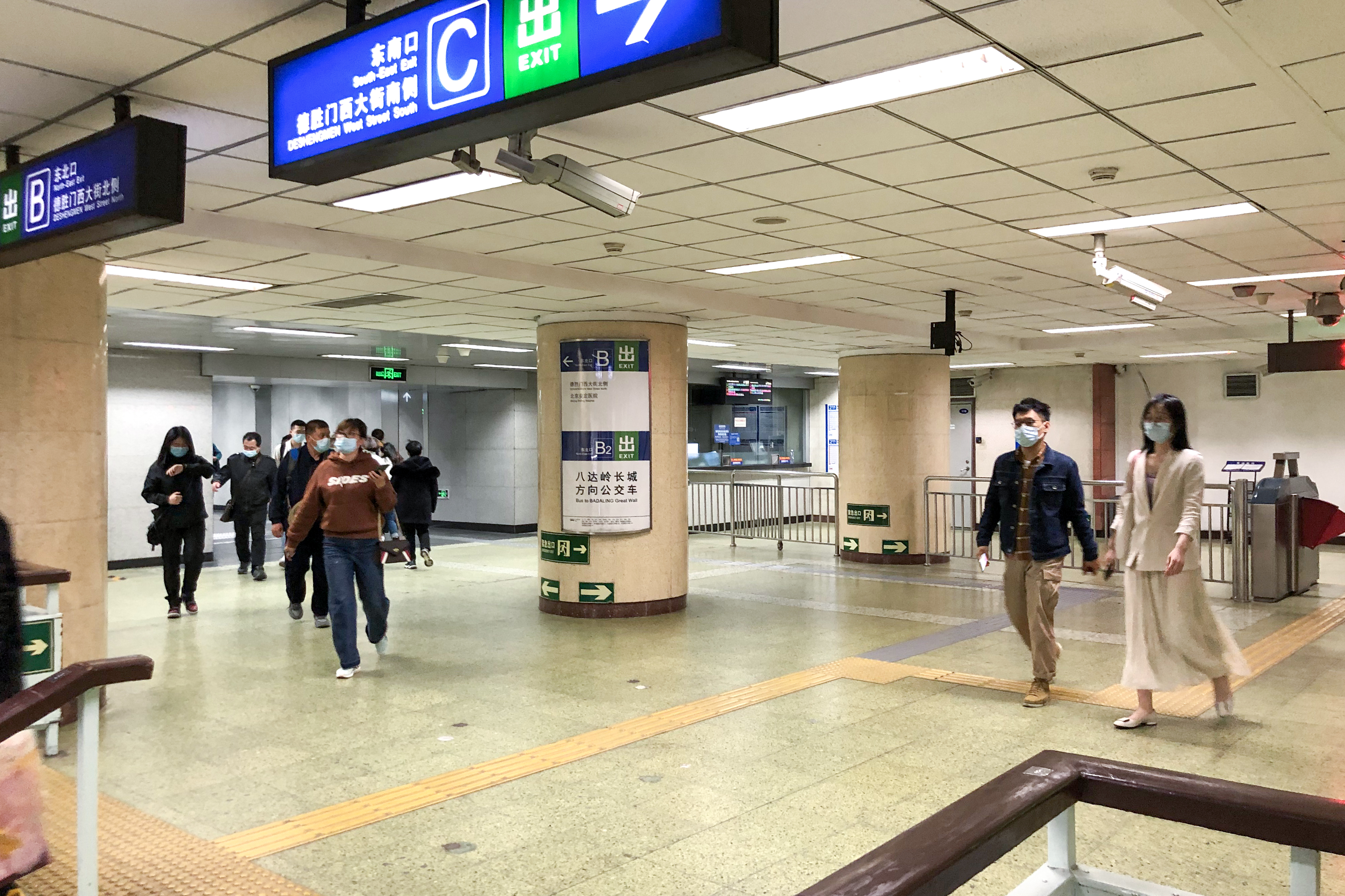
Line 2 east concourse (April 2021)

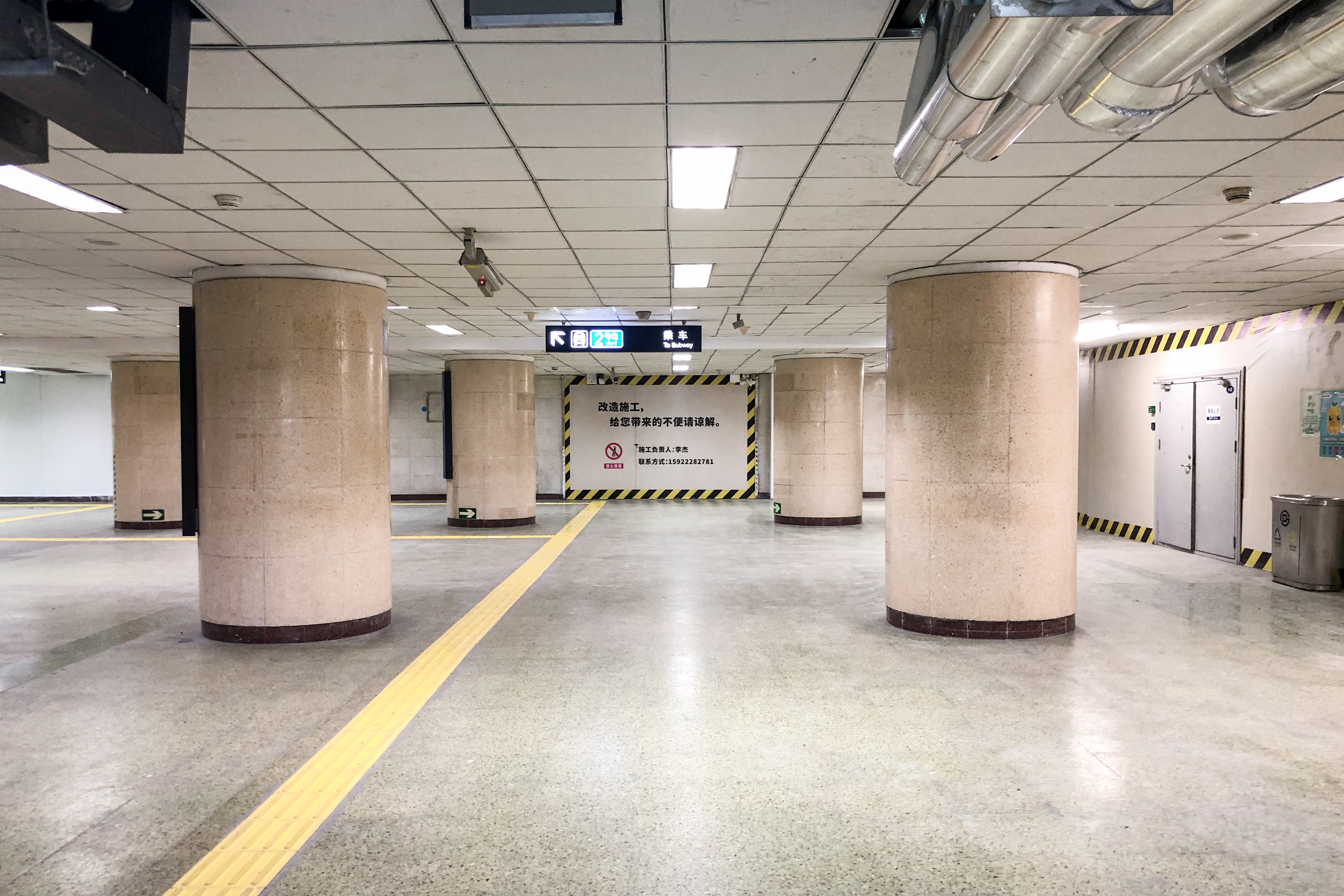
Line 2 west concourse (June 2021)

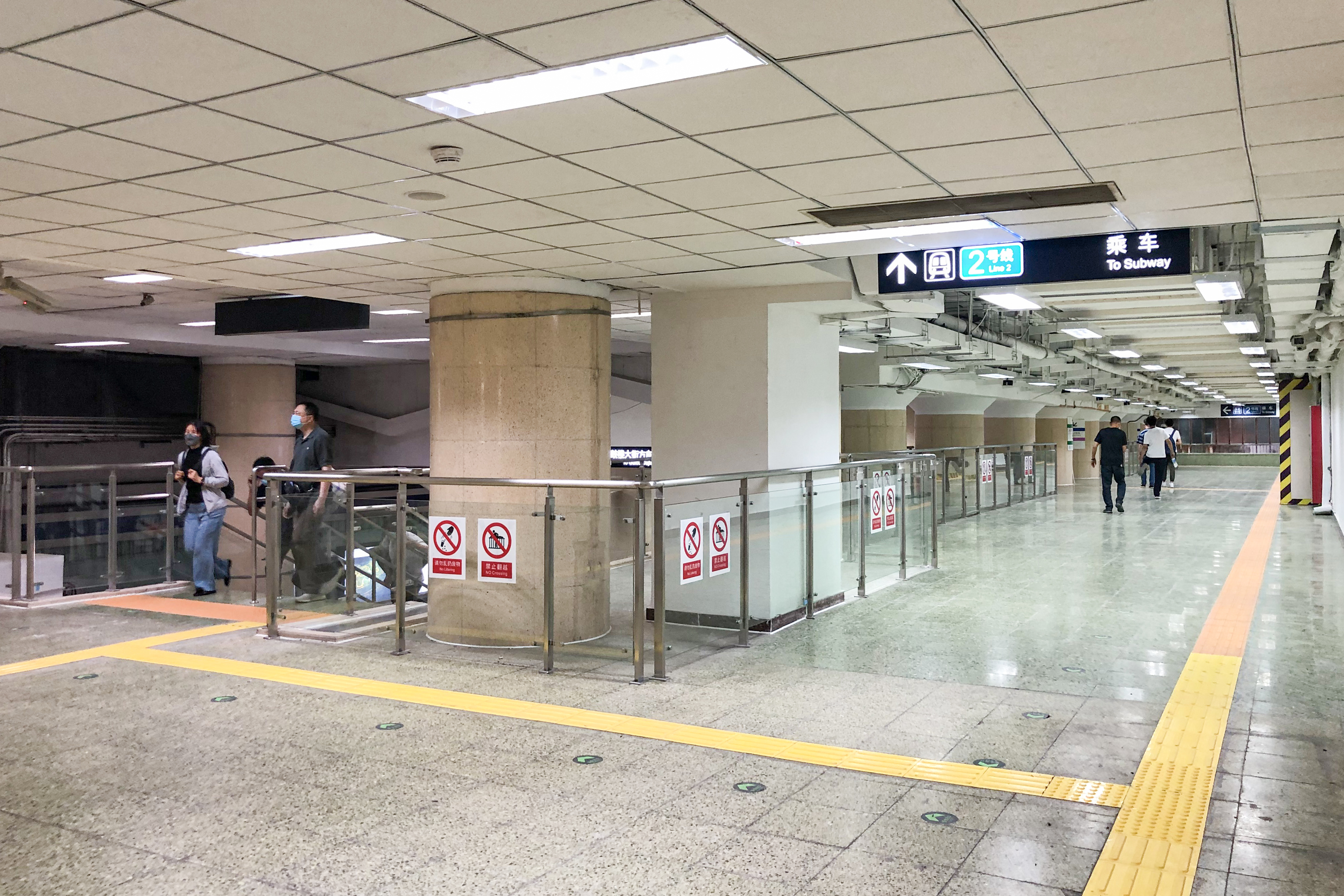
Line 2 west concourse extension (June 2021)

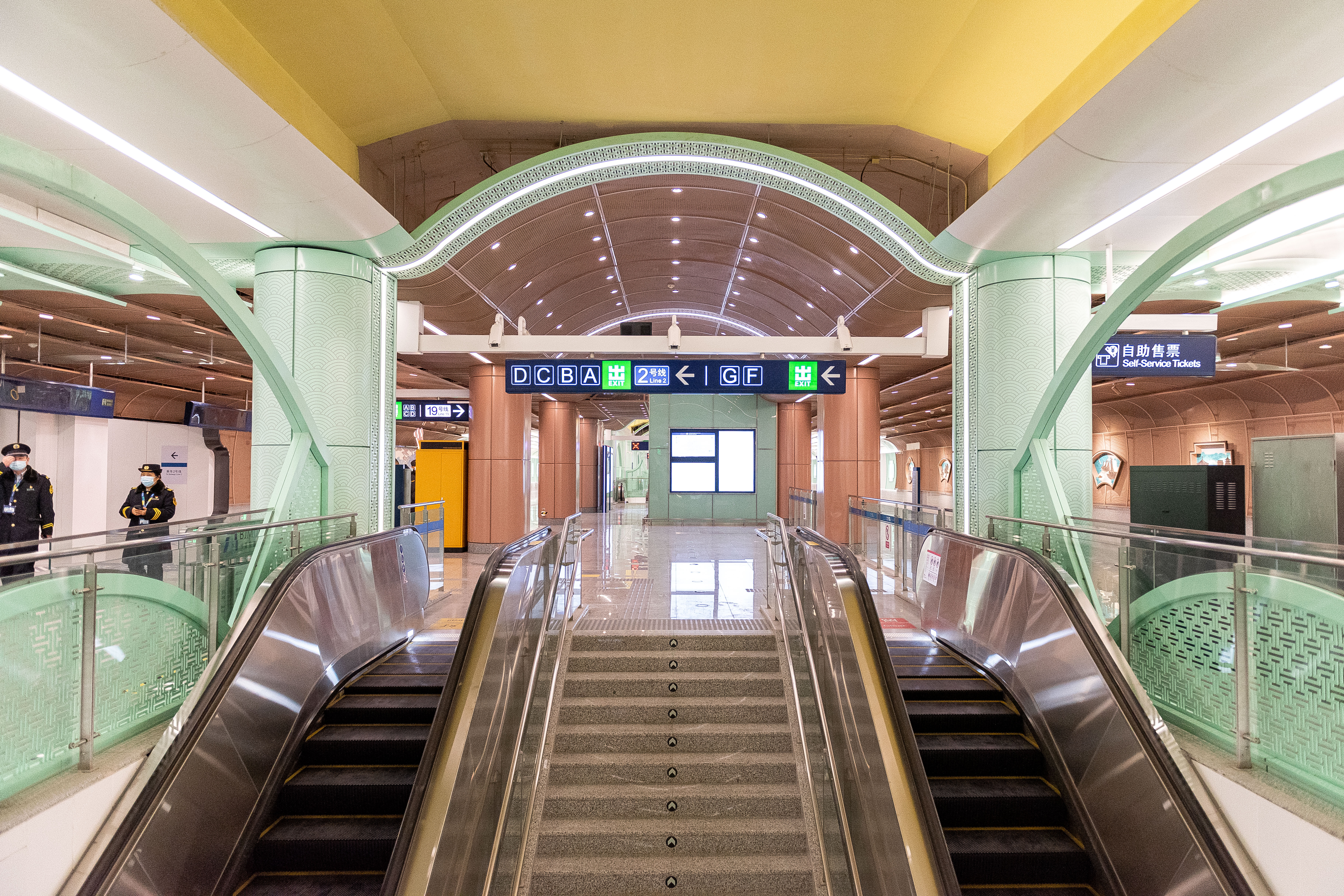
Line 19 concourse [1]

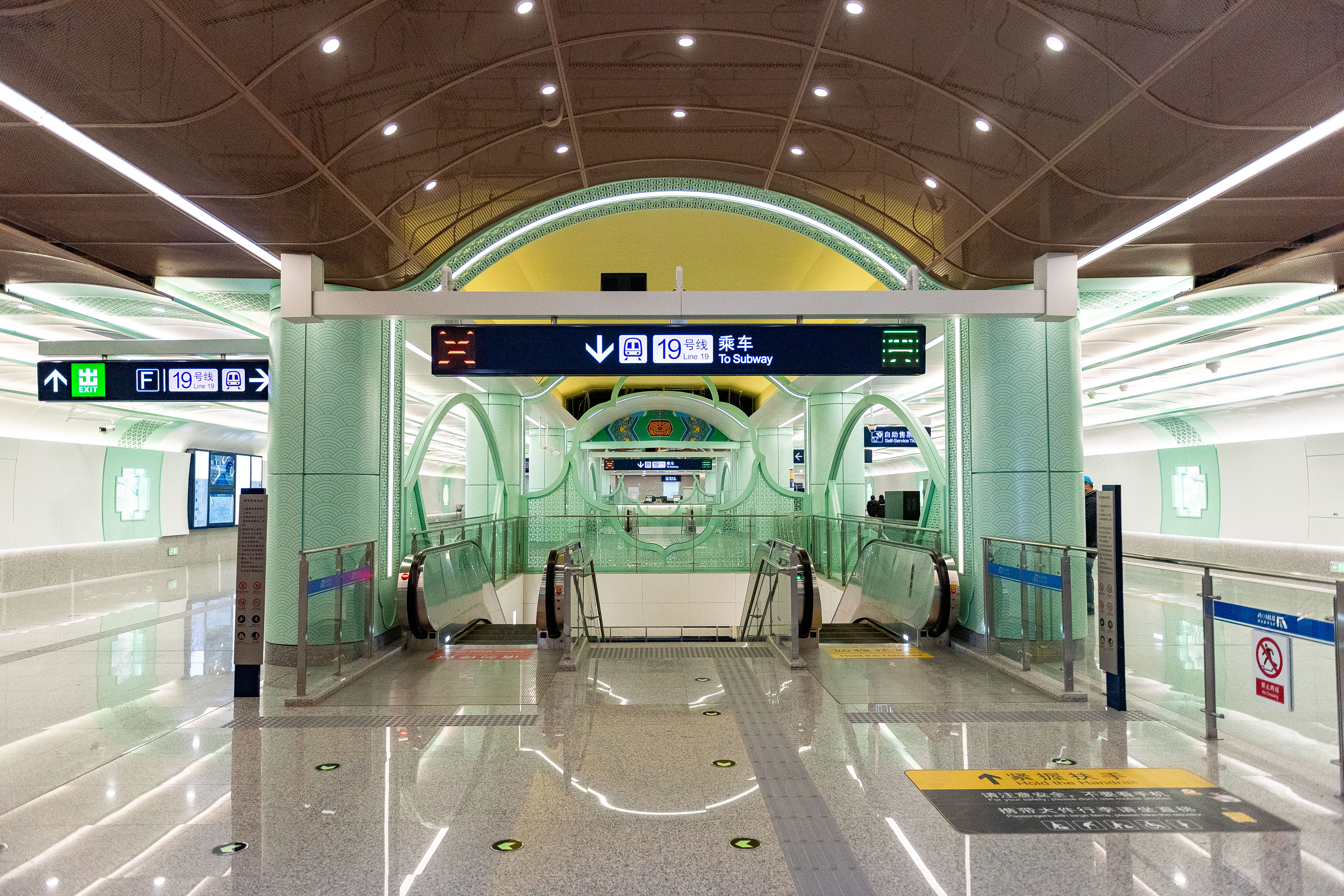
Line 19 concourse [2]
