= Changchun Jie station =

Beijing Subway station

Changchun Jie 长椿街
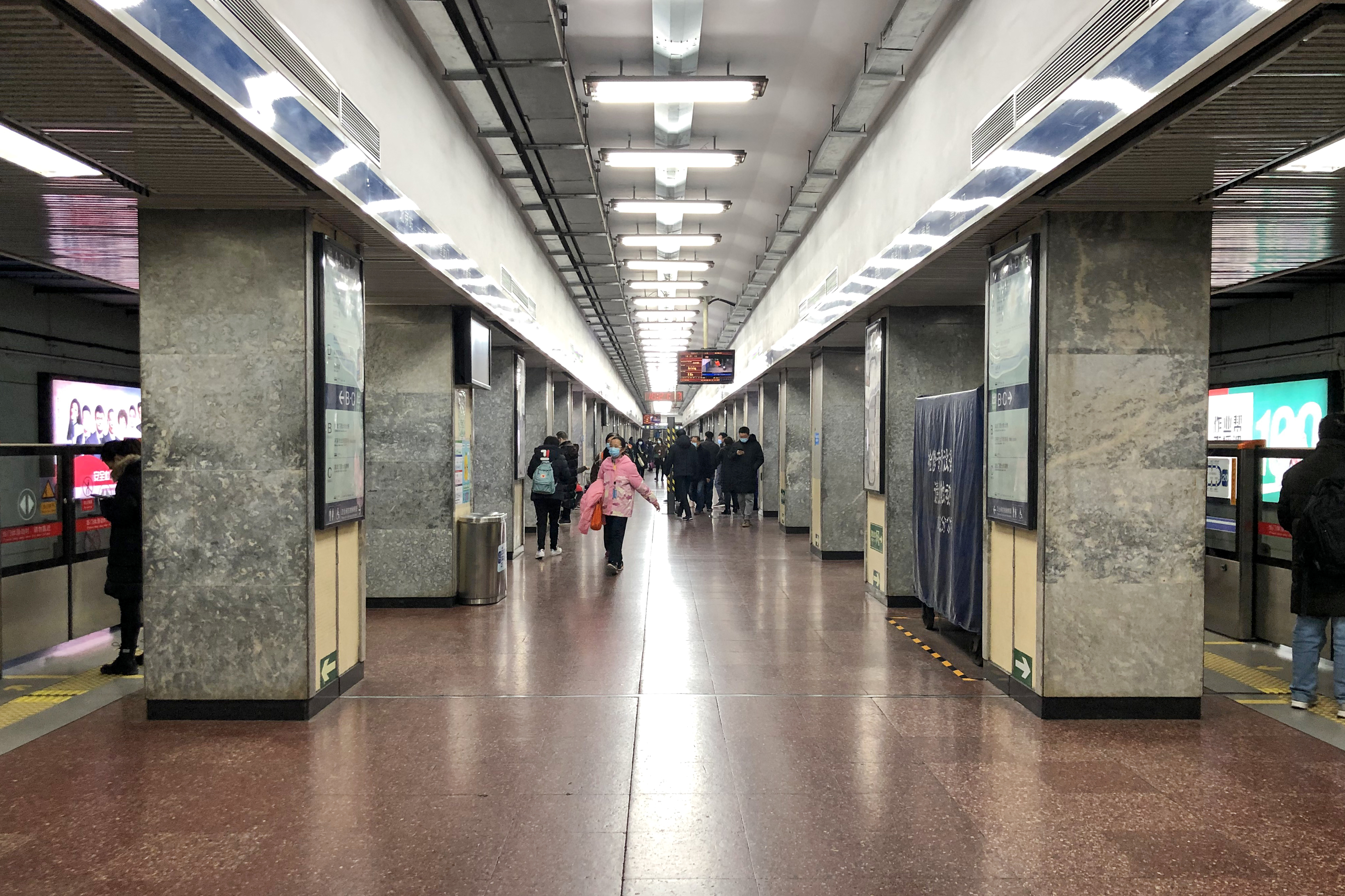
- Platform

General information
- Location: Xuanwumen West Street and Changchun Street; Xicheng District, Beijing; China
- Coordinates: 39.899433°N 116.363355°E
- Operator: Beijing Mass Transit Railway Operation Corporation Limited
- Line: Line 2
- Platforms: 2 (1 island platform)
- Tracks: 2

Construction
- Structure type: Underground
- Accessible: Yes

Other information
- Station code: 205

History
- Opened: January 15, 1971; 55 years ago

Services
Preceding station	Beijing Subway	Following station
Xuanwu Men outer loop / anticlockwise	Line 2	Fuxingmen inner loop / clockwise
Location
- Location within Beijing

Changchun Jie Station (simplified Chinese: 长椿街站; traditional Chinese: 長椿街站; pinyin: Chángchūn Jiē Zhàn) is a station on Line 2 of the Beijing Subway.

== Station layout ==
The station has an underground island platform.

== history ==
This station was originally a station of the Beijing Subway Phase I Project. It began trial operation on January 15, 1971. The up-line station at that time was Nanlishi Road Station. Until December 28, 1987, the Changchun Street-Beijing Station section and the Phase II Project were reorganized into a ring line, and the original Phase I Project Changchun Street-Nanlishi Road section was changed to the Changli Link Line.

== Exits ==
There are 8 exits, lettered A1, A2, B1, B2, C1, C2, D1, and D2. Exit B1 is accessible.
