= Taipingqiao station (Beijing Subway) =

Beijing Subway station

Taipingqiao 太平桥
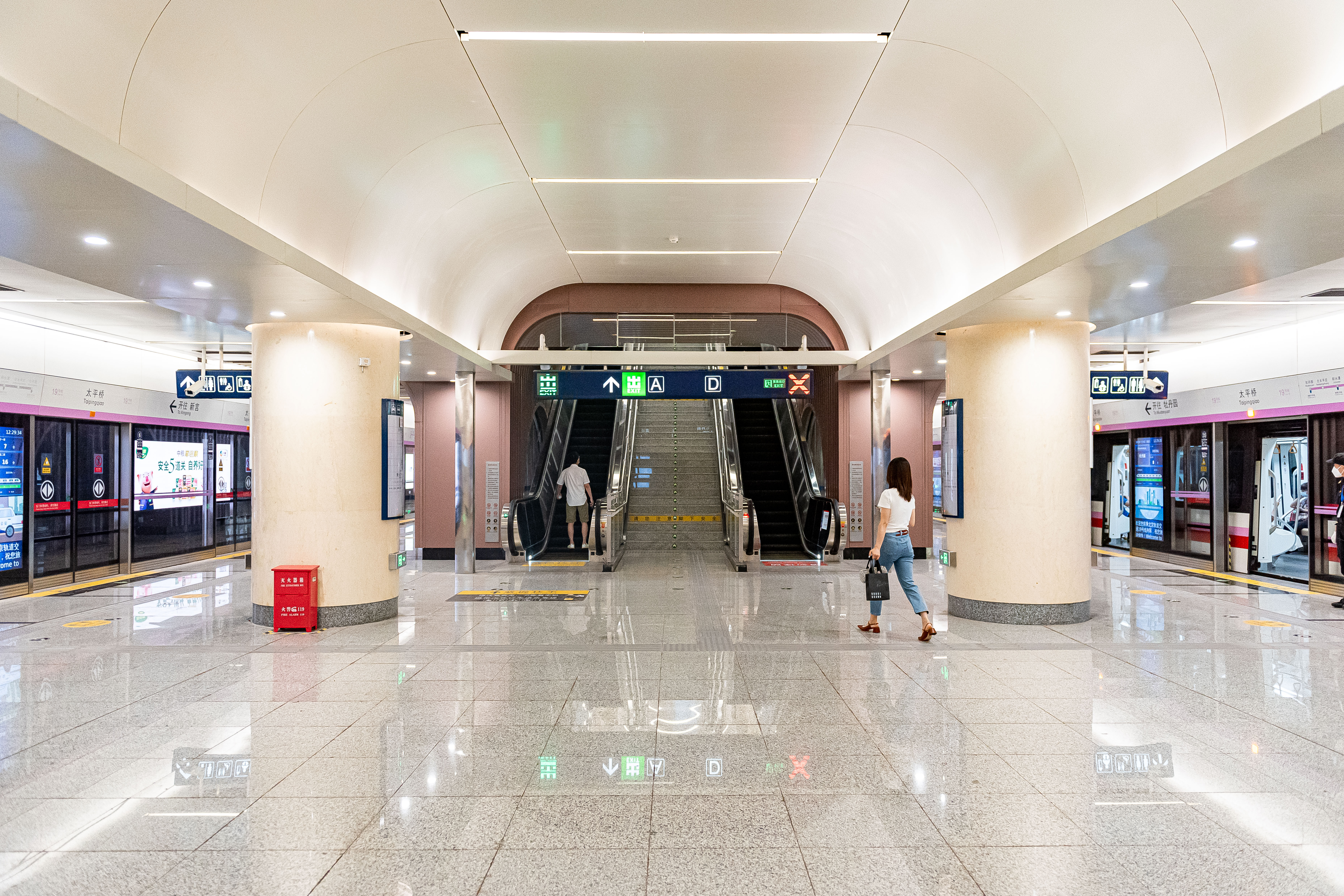
- Platform

General information
- Location: Intersection of Taipingqiao Street (太平桥大街) and West Xingsheng Hutong (西兴盛胡同), Jinrongjie Subdistrict, Xicheng District, Beijing; China
- Operator: Beijing Metro Operation Administration (BJMOA) Corp., Ltd.
- Line: Line 19
- Platforms: 2 (1 island platform)
- Tracks: 2
- Connections: Line 1 and Line 2 (OSI via Fuxingmen)

Construction
- Structure type: Underground
- Accessible: Yes

History
- Opened: July 30, 2022; 4 years ago

Services
Preceding station	Beijing Subway	Following station
Ping'anli towards Mudanyuan	Line 19	Niujie towards Xingong
Location
- Location within Beijing

Taipingqiao station (Chinese: 太平桥站; pinyin: Tàipíngqiáo Zhàn) is a subway station on Line 19 of the Beijing Subway. The station opened on 30 July 2022.

== Name ==
The station was previously known as Jinrongjie station (Chinese: 金融街站; pinyin: Jīnróngjiē zhàn; lit. 'Financial Street station') during construction. However, the metro station is actually located outside the core area of Beijing Financial Street, so the metro station was renamed to Taipingqiao station to consistent with the nearby Beijing Bus station which also called Taipingqiao.

== Platform layout ==
The station has an underground island platform.

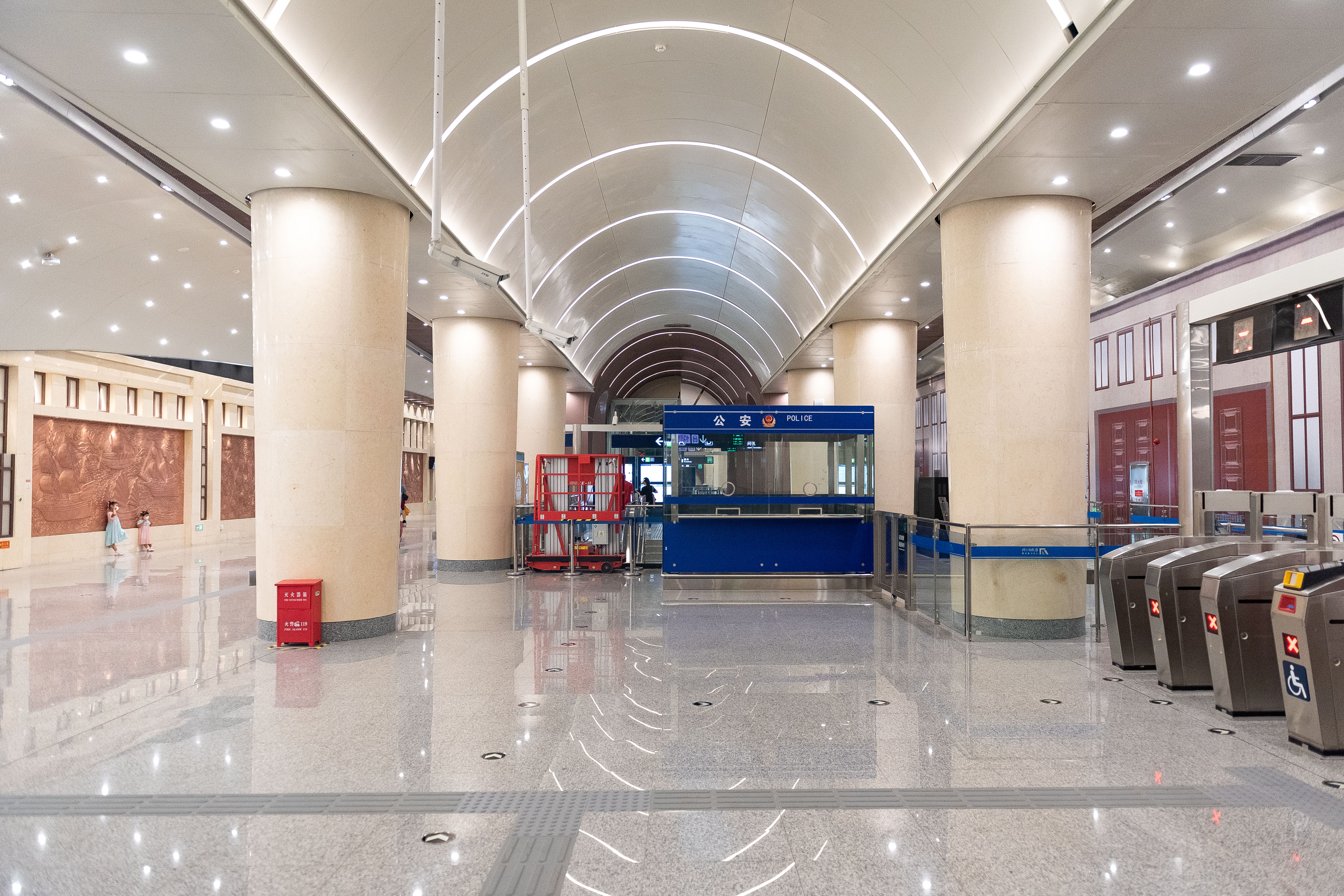
Concourse

== Exits ==
There are 2 exits, lettered A and D. Exit D is accessible as it provides lift access.
