= Xuanwu Men station =

Beijing Subway interchange station

Xuanwu Men 宣武门
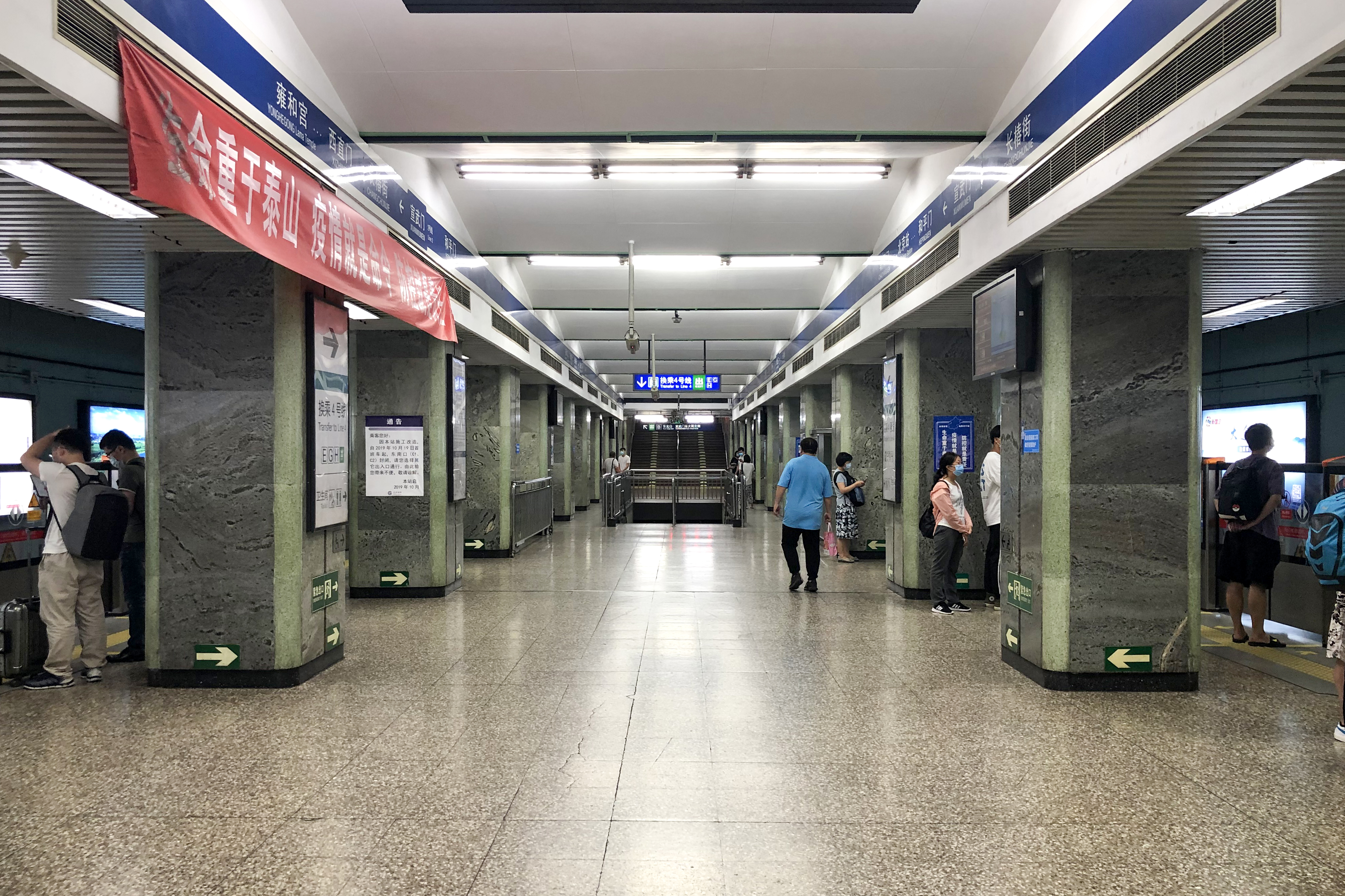
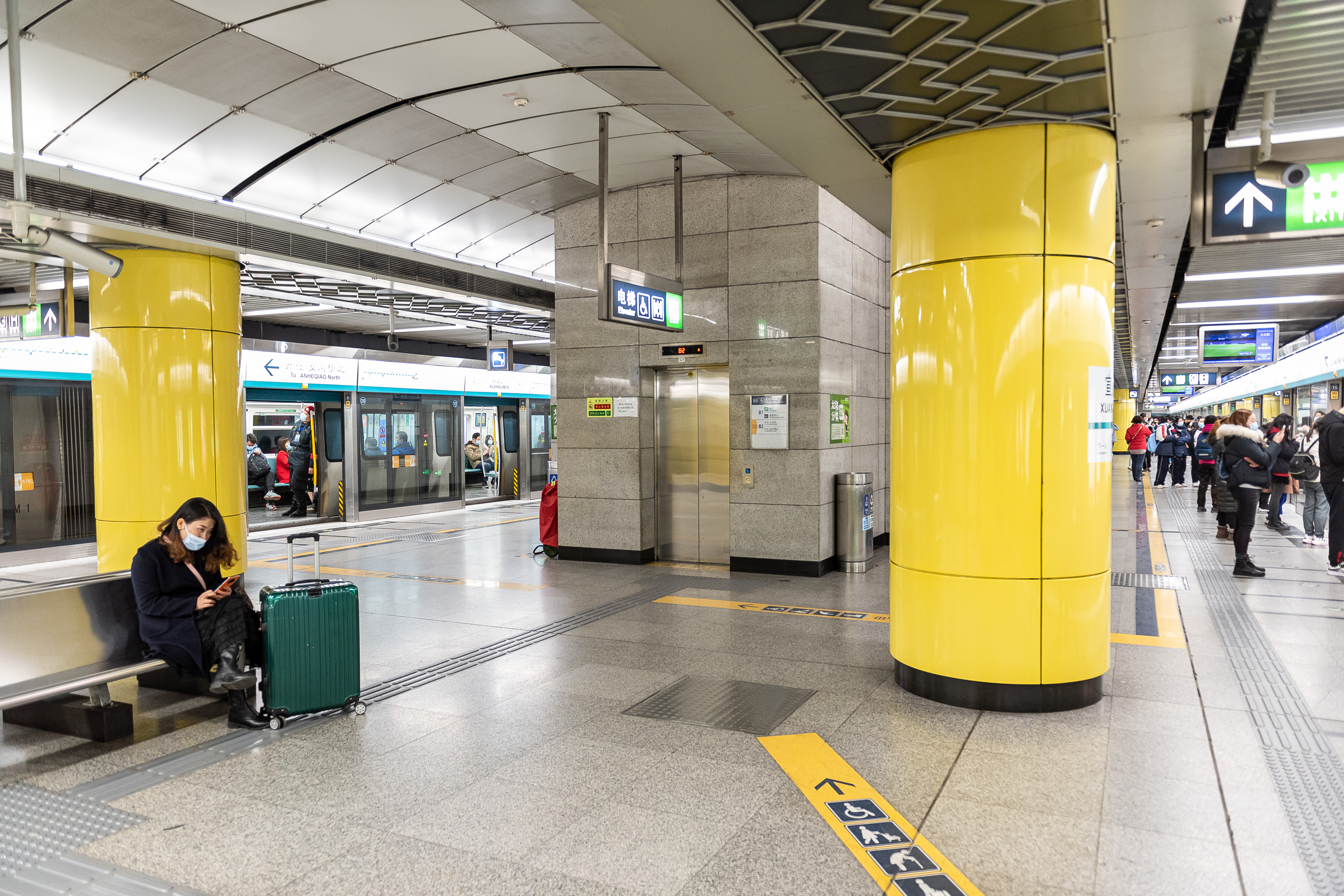
- Line 2 platform in August 2020 Line 4 platform

General information
- Location: Xuanwumen; Xicheng District, Beijing; China
- Coordinates: 39.8997°N 116.3743°E
- Operator: Beijing Mass Transit Railway Operation Corporation Limited (Line 2); Beijing MTR Corporation Limited (Line 4)
- Lines: Line 2; Line 4
- Platforms: 4 (2 island platforms)
- Tracks: 4

Construction
- Structure type: Underground
- Accessible: Yes

Other information
- Station code: 206 (Line 2)

History
- Opened: January 15, 1971; 55 years ago (Line 2); September 28, 2009; 16 years ago (Line 4)

Services
Preceding station	Beijing Subway	Following station
Heping Men outer loop / anticlockwise	Line 2	Changchun Jie inner loop / clockwise
Xidan towards Anheqiaobei	Line 4	Caishi Kou towards Tiangong Yuan
Location
- Location within Beijing

Xuanwu Men Station (simplified Chinese: 宣武门站; traditional Chinese: 宣武門站; pinyin: Xuānwǔ Mén Zhàn) is an interchange station between Line 2 and Line 4 of the Beijing Subway. It is named for Xuanwumen, a former gate in Beijing's city wall that was demolished during construction of the subway. The station opened in 1971 and handles an average of 350,000 passengers per day in 2012. Interchange volumes can reach per hour can reach 15,000 passengers per hour in the morning peak. The large transfer volumes overwhelm the small interchange corridors, which can narrow to only 2.4 meters in width. Three new transfer corridors were added in 2020, increasing transfer capacity of the station six-fold to around 55,000 passengers per hour.

== Station layout ==
Both the line 2 and 4 stations have underground island platforms.

== Exits ==
There are 6 exits, lettered B, C, E, F, G, and H. Exit G are accessible.

== Gallery ==
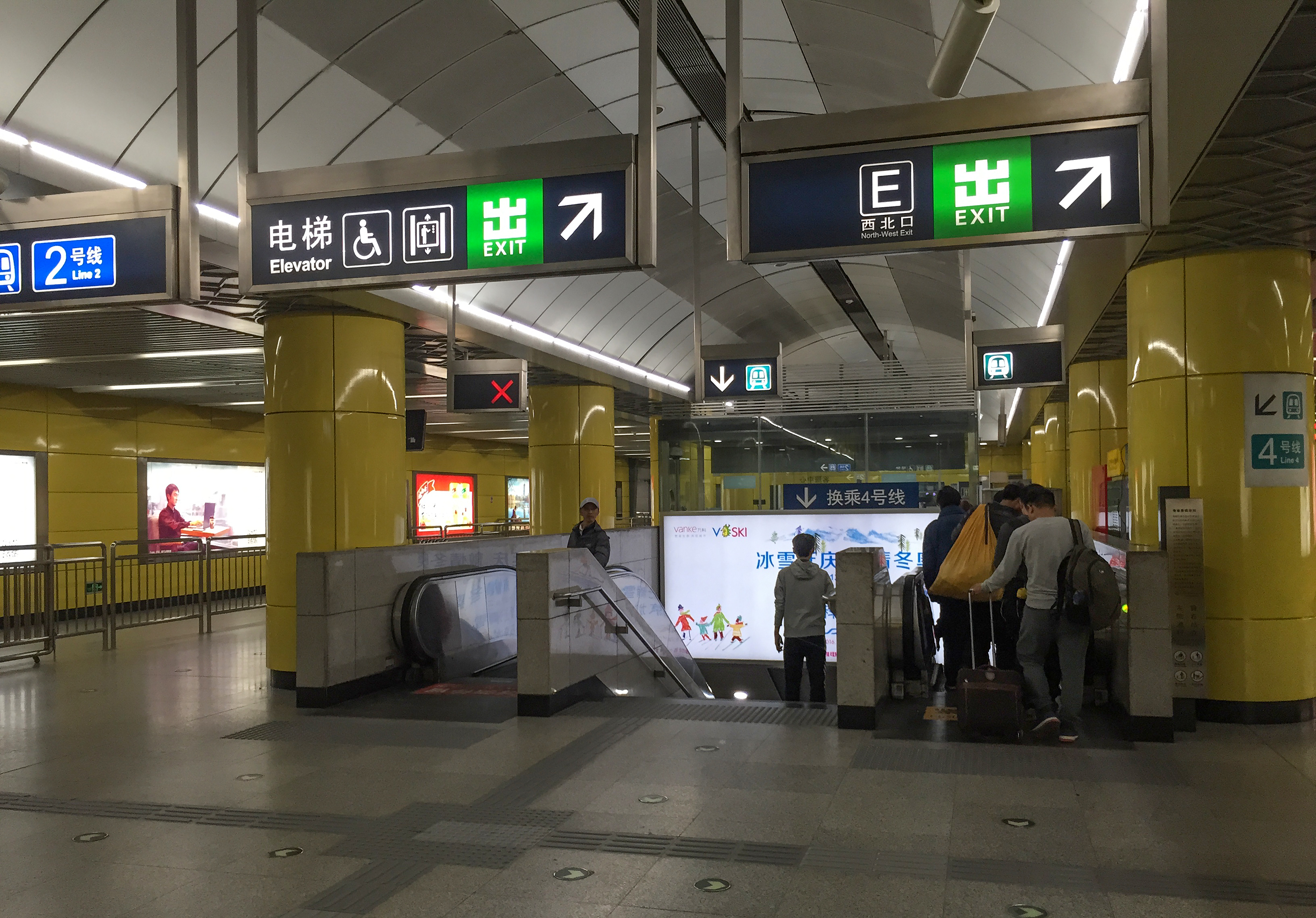
Line 4 north concourse

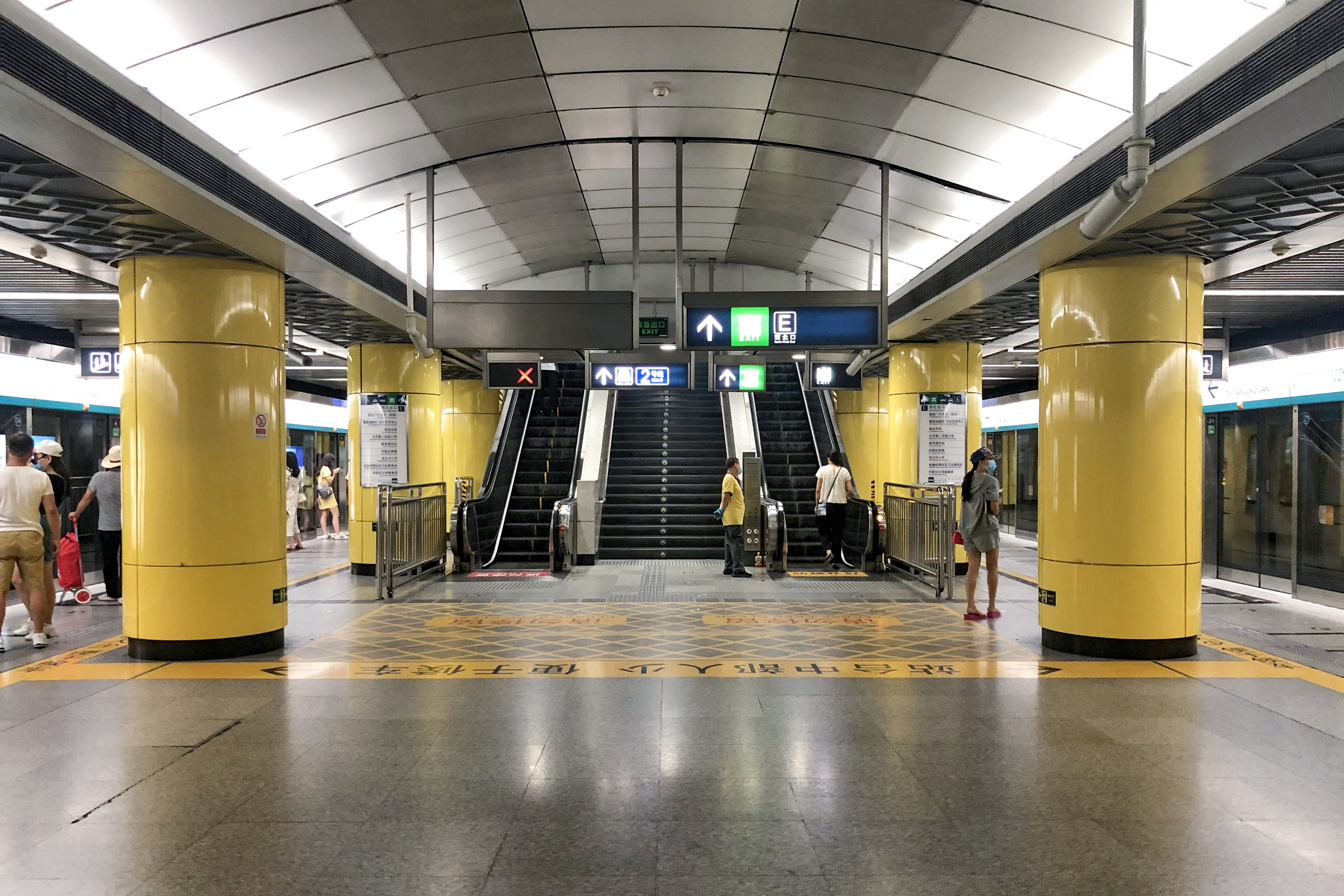
Line 4 platform (August 2020)

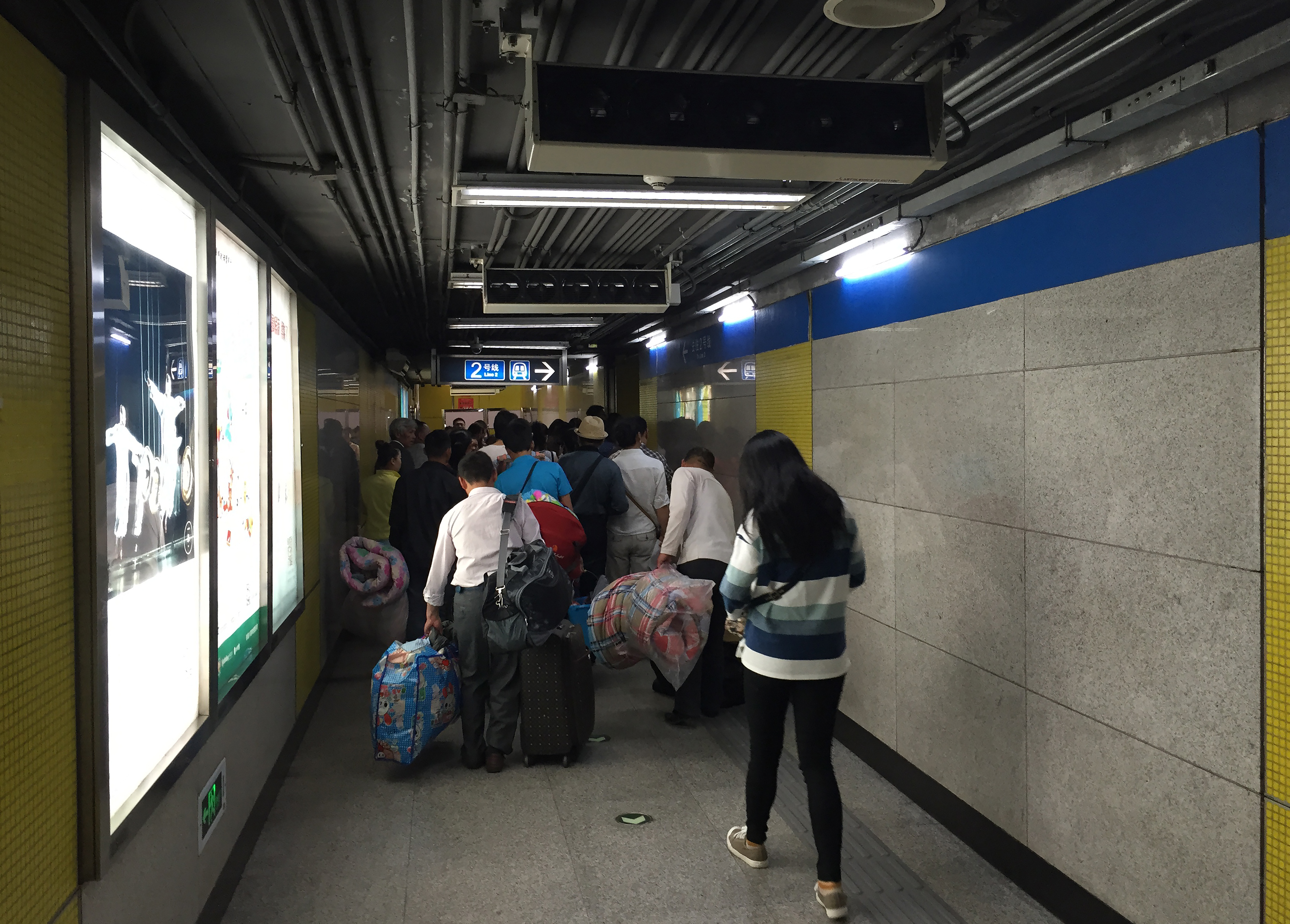
Interchange corridor

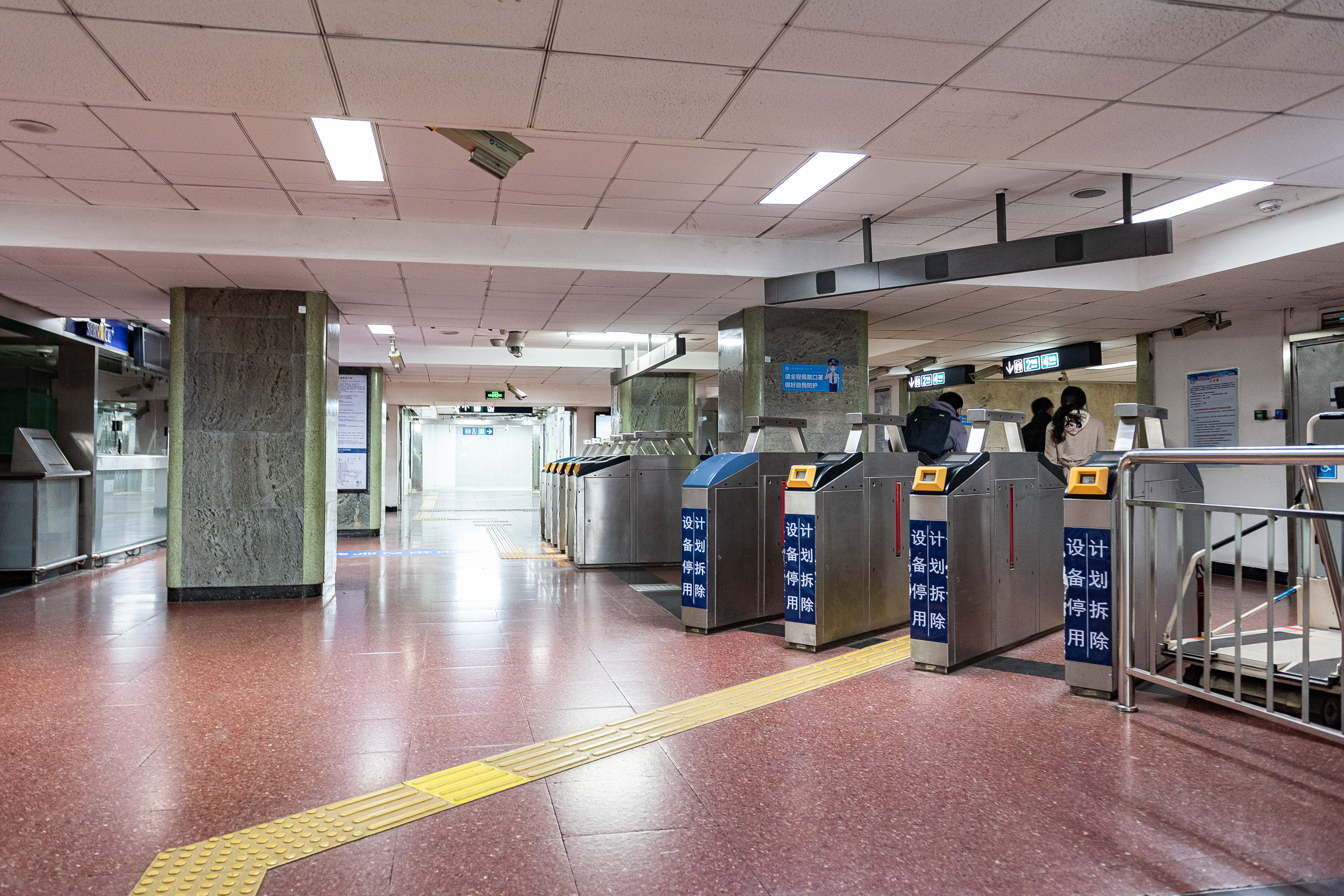
Line 2 west concourse (gates no longer in use)

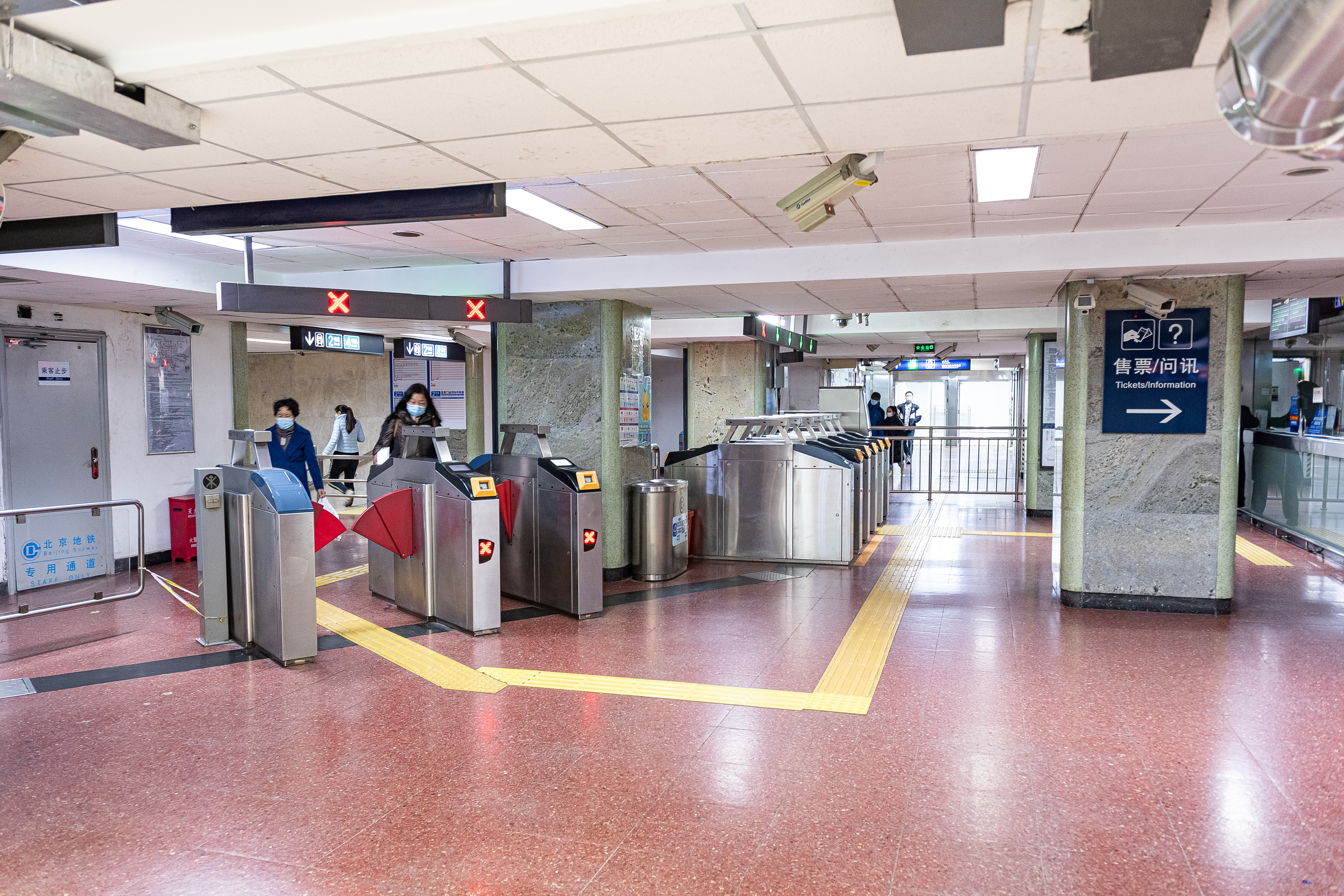
Line 2 east concourse

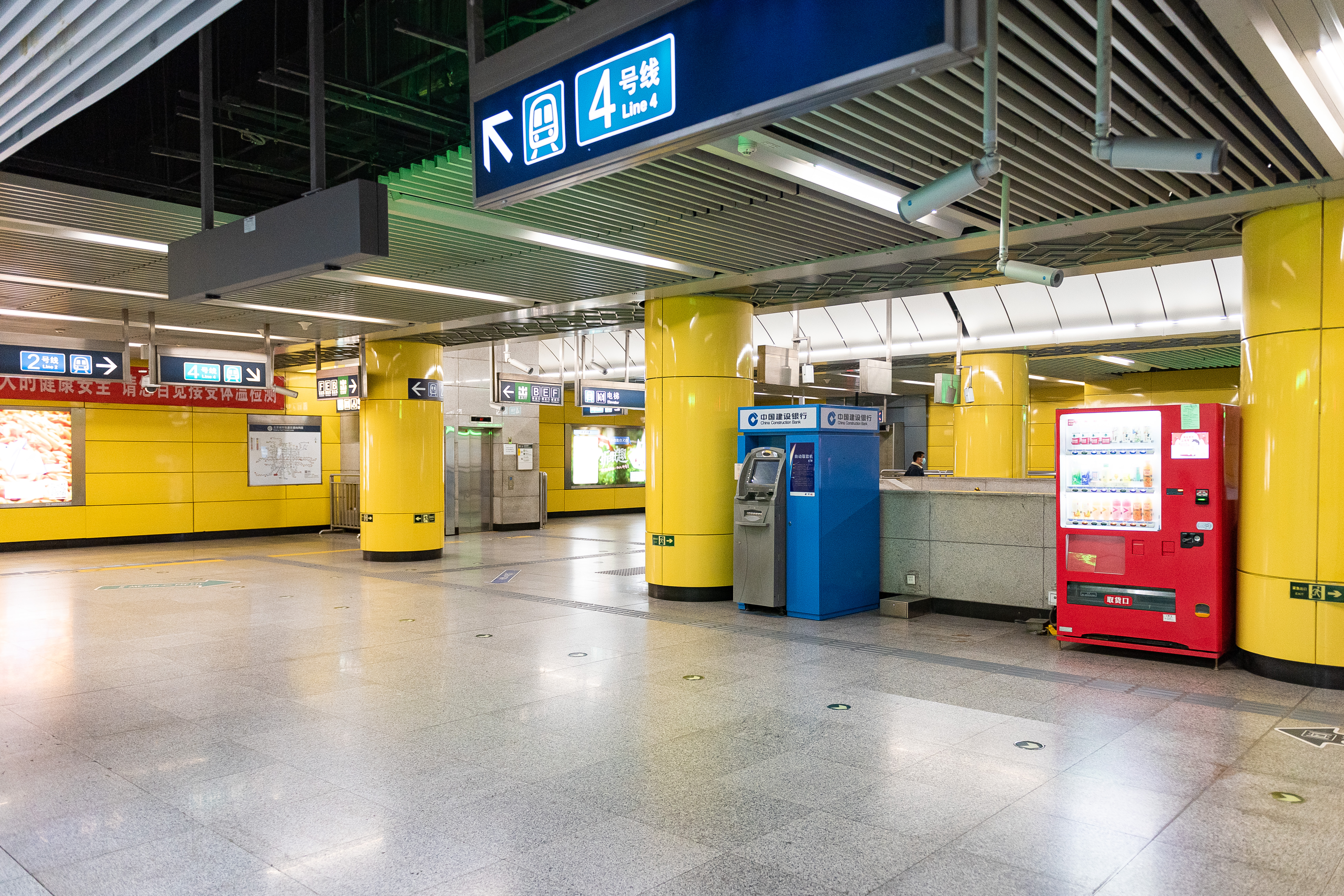
Line 4 north concourse

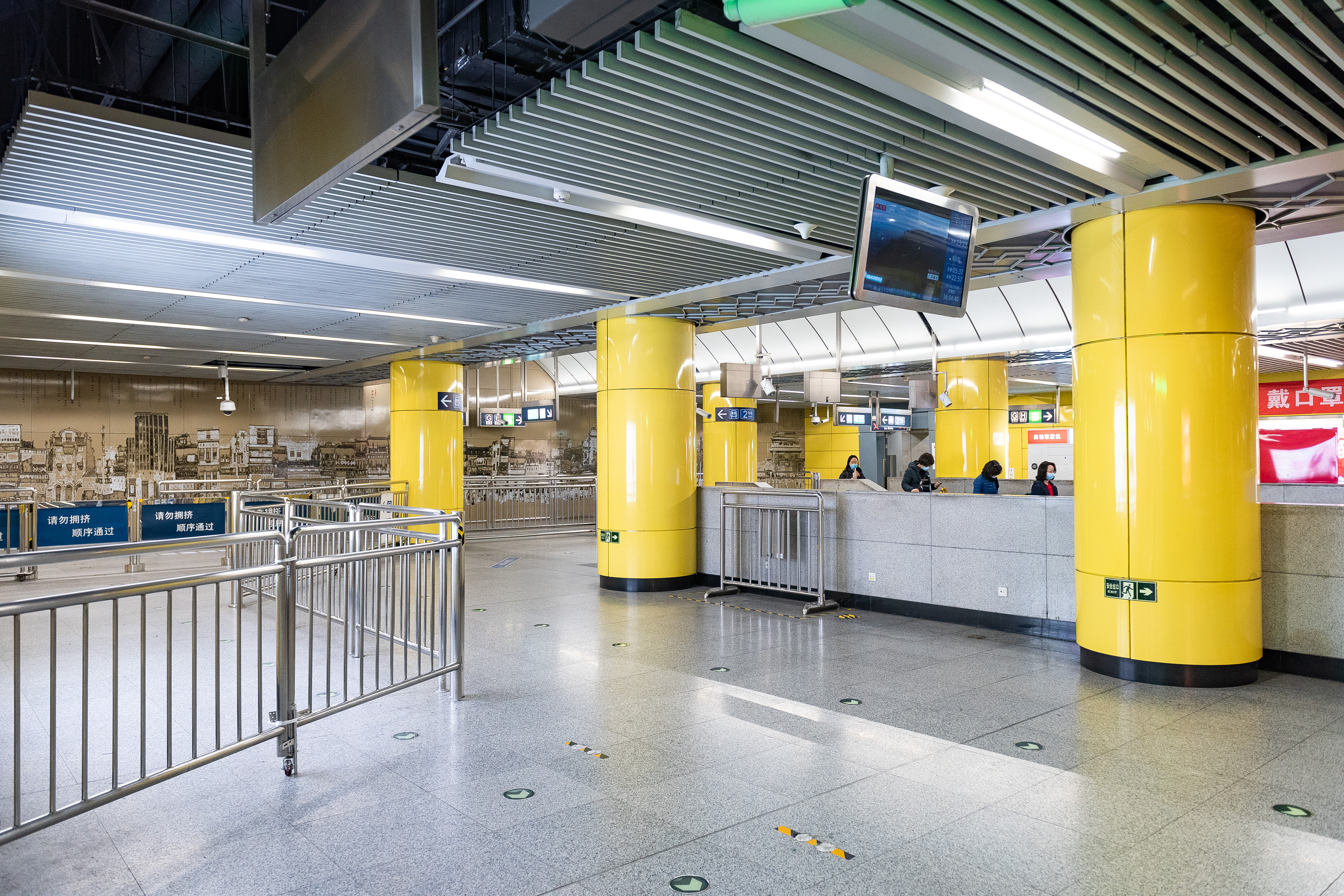
Line 4 south concourse

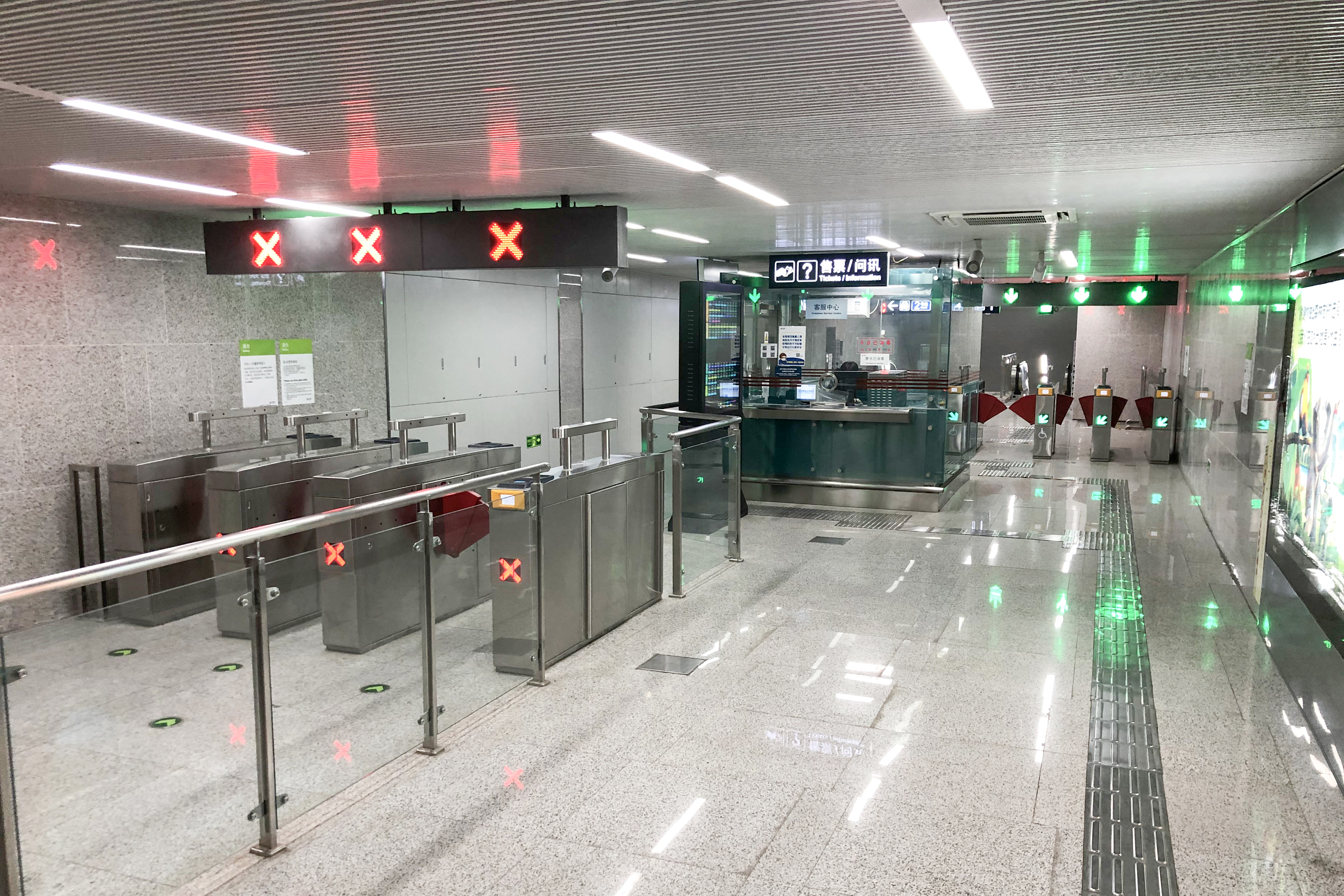
Exit B concourse
