= Line 2 (Beijing Subway) =

Metro line in Beijing, China

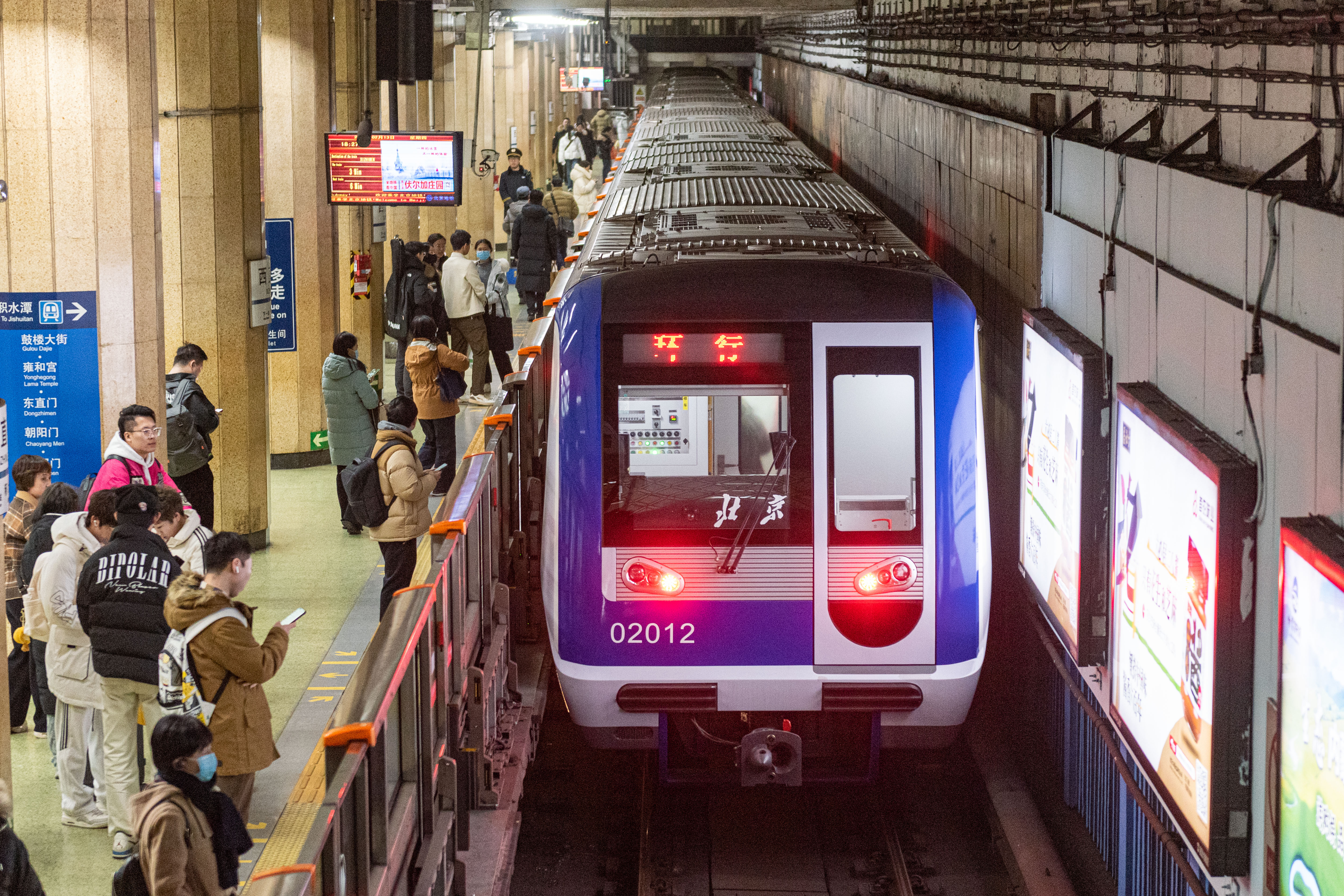
- Line 2 train

Overview
- Other name(s): M2 (planned name); Loop line (Chinese: 环线)
- Status: Operational
- Locale: Xicheng and Dongcheng districts Beijing
- Stations: 18
- Colour on map: Dark blue

Service
- Type: Rapid transit
- System: Beijing Subway
- Operator: Beijing Mass Transit Railway Operation Corporation Limited
- Depot: Taipinghu depot
- Rolling stock: 6-car Quasi-Type B (DKZ16)
- Daily ridership: 606,600 (2024 Avg.); 1,529,800 (2014 Peak)

History
- Opened: September 20, 1984; 42 years ago

Technical
- Line length: 23.1 km (14.4 mi)
- Character: Fully underground
- Track gauge: 1,435 mm (4 ft 8 1/2 in)
- Electrification: 750 V DC third rail

Line 2 of the Beijing Subway (Chinese: 北京地铁2号线; pinyin: běijīng dìtiě èrhào xiàn) is a rapid transit rail line in central Beijing that runs in a rectangular loop around the city centre. The line traces the Ming dynasty inner city wall, which was demolished and paved over by the 2nd Ring Road and Qianmen Avenue to make room. Line 2, opened in 1984, is the second oldest and one of the busiest of Beijing's subway lines, and to date the only one to serve Beijing railway station. All 18 stations on the 23.1 km (14.4 mi) line are underground. 13 of the 18 stations offer transfers to other lines. Line 2's color is dark blue on official maps, signage, and stations.

== Hours of Operation ==
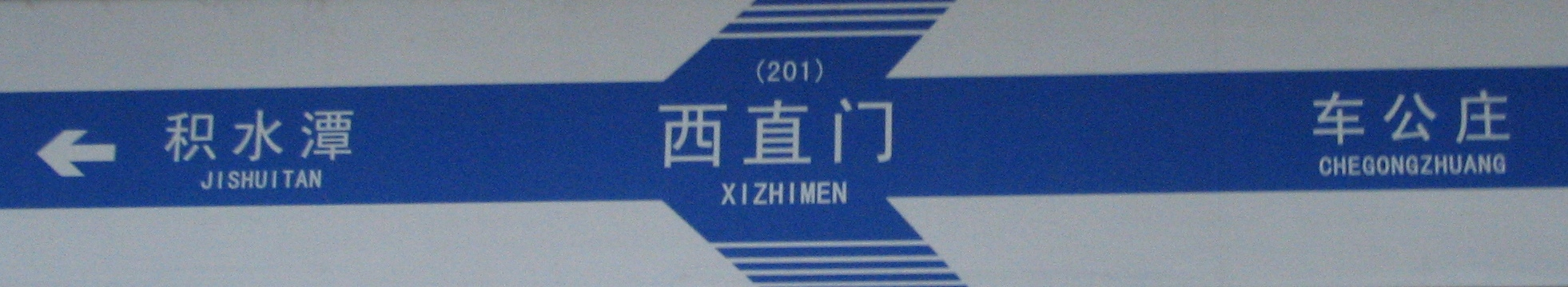
Platform sign indicating inner loop Line 2 train (going in the clockwise direction) at the Xizhimen (Station No. 201)

Because Line 2 is a loop line with no true terminus, trains are identified as either running on the inner loop (内环; nèihuán), going in the clockwise direction, or on the outer loop (外环; wàihuán), going in the counter-clockwise direction. However, trains returning to the Taipinghu Depot either terminate at Xizhimen or Jishuitan; passengers are asked to wait for a full loop line train at these stations.

The first inner loop train departs Jishuitan at 5:03 am. The first outer loop train departs Xizhimen at 5:09 am. The last inner loop train leaves Jishuitan at 10:55 pm. The last outer loop train leaves Xizhimen at 11:14 pm. For the official timetable, please see the Beijing Subway website.

== Route ==
Line 2 encircles the old city center districts of Dongcheng and Xicheng and skirts the western edge of Chaoyang. The entire line runs underground.

== List of Stations ==
Eleven of Line 2's eighteen stations are named after gates in the old city wall. These stations end in men, meaning gate. The twelfth gate, Deshengmen, is near Jishuitan station. The following table lists Line 2 stations in the outer loop or counter-clockwise order, starting from the station with the lowest numbered code.

Station Name		Connections	Nearby Bus Stops	Travel Time	Distance km		Location
English	Chinese	Connections	Nearby Bus Stops	Travel Time	Distance km		Location
— ↑ loop line - towards Jishuitan ↑ —						-1.899	
Xizhimen	西直门	4 13 Huairou–Miyun VAP	7 16 21 26 27 44 69 80 87 105 111 200 305 332 347 362 375 387 534 604 618 632 651 686 693 夜8 夜20 专216	0:00	0.000	0.000	Xicheng
Chegongzhuang	车公庄	6	4 19 21 44 69 80 107 118 200 332 387 618 632 686 693 夜3 夜8 夜20 专216	0:02	0.909	0.909	Xicheng
Fucheng Men	阜成门		3 13 19 21 44 45 56 61 69 73 80 101 102 103 121 200 332 387 409 423 612 618 686 BRT4(快速公交4) 快速直达专线168 夜8 夜13 夜20	0:04	0.960	1.869	Xicheng
Fuxingmen	复兴门	1; 19 (Out-of-system interchange via Taipingqiao)	1 1区 10 15 44 49 52 69 200 332 387 395 423 夜1 夜20 专191	0:07	1.832	3.701	Xicheng
Changchun Jie	长椿街		7 9 10 38 44 47 67 88 137 142 143 144 332 395 676 901快 夜5 夜23 夜36 专191	0:09	1.234	4.935	Xicheng
Xuanwu Men	宣武门	4	7 9 15 22 44 67 83 102 105 109 137 142 143 144 332 夜4 夜5	0:11	0.929	5.864	Xicheng
Heping Men	和平门		7 9 14 15 22 44 66 67 137 142 332 夜5	0:13	0.851	6.715	Xicheng
Qianmen	前门	8	2 5 8 9 22 44 48 59 66 67 82 93 120 137 141 142 332 599 622 901快 观光1 观光2 夜2 夜5	0:15	1.171	7.886	Dongcheng
Chongwen Men	崇文门	5	8 9 12 17 24 29 39 41 44 60 63 84 103 104 106 108 110 111 128 137 142 599 622 夜5 夜19 夜24 夜28	0:17	1.634	9.520	Dongcheng
Beijing railway station	北京站	Sub-Central BJP	9 24 29 52 63 103 104 122 126 140 142 403 622 637 639 668 夜5 夜19 夜24 夜28 夜29	0:21	1.023	10.543	Dongcheng
Jianguomen	建国门	1	1 1区 24 39 44 52 58 63 120 122 126 139 140 142 200 403 637 639 夜1 夜19 夜20 夜24 夜28 夜29	0:23	0.945	11.488	Dongcheng / Chaoyang (Note: At Jianguomen and Chaoyangmen, Line 2 straddles the border between Dongcheng and Chaoyang Districts.)
Chaoyang Men	朝阳门	6	44 58 75 101 109 110 139 142 200 BRT2(快速公交2) 通医专线3 夜13 夜20	0:26	1.763	13.251	Dongcheng / Chaoyang
Dongsi Shitiao	东四十条	3	3 4 44 75 113 115 118 142 200 406 431 通医专线3 夜3 夜20 夜34	0:28	1.027	14.278	Dongcheng
Dongzhimen	东直门	13 Capital Airport	18 24 44 75 106 107 117 123 130 132 135 142 200 359 401 404 413 416 612 850快 852 852快 915 916快 918 935快 942 980快 快速直达专线72 快速直达专线102 通医专线3 夜20 专26	0:30	0.824	15.102	Dongcheng
Yonghegong Lama Temple	雍和宫	5	13 18 44 75 84 115 117 125 130 142 200 夜20	0:34	2.228	17.330	Dongcheng
Anding Men	安定门		18 27 44 75 104 108 113 119 124 125 141 142 200 301 430 BRT3(快速公交3) 夜20 夜34	0:36	0.794	18.124	Dongcheng
Gulou Dajie	鼓楼大街	8	27 44 60 82 200 380 409 夜20 夜36 专51	0:38	1.237	19.361	Dongcheng / Xicheng (Note: At Guloudajie, the Line 2 station straddles the border between Dongcheng and Xicheng Districts.)
Jishuitan	积水潭	19	5 22 27 44 47 55 80 88 135 143 200 331 344 345 345快 347 380 409 508 604 618 620 625 670 883 885 886 886区 919快 观光3 快速直达专线12 快速直达专线66 快速直达专线124 快速直达专线125 快速直达专线128 快速直达专线134 快速直达专线148 快速直达专线214 通医专线2 夜2 夜4 夜20 夜36 夜38 专31 专51 专168	0:41	1.766	21.127	Xicheng
— ↓ Loop line - towards Xizhimen ↓ —						1.899	23.026

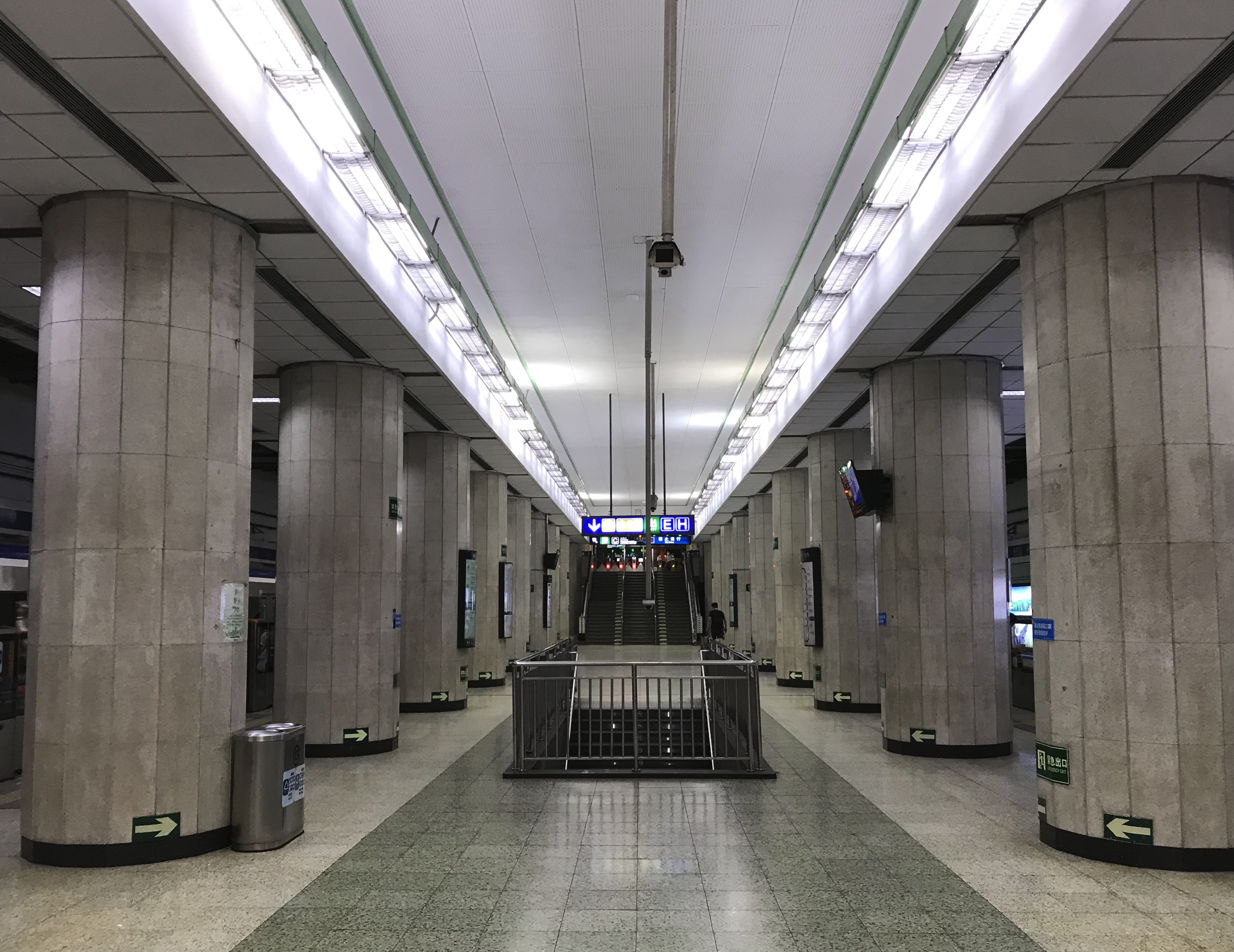
Chegongzhuang Station

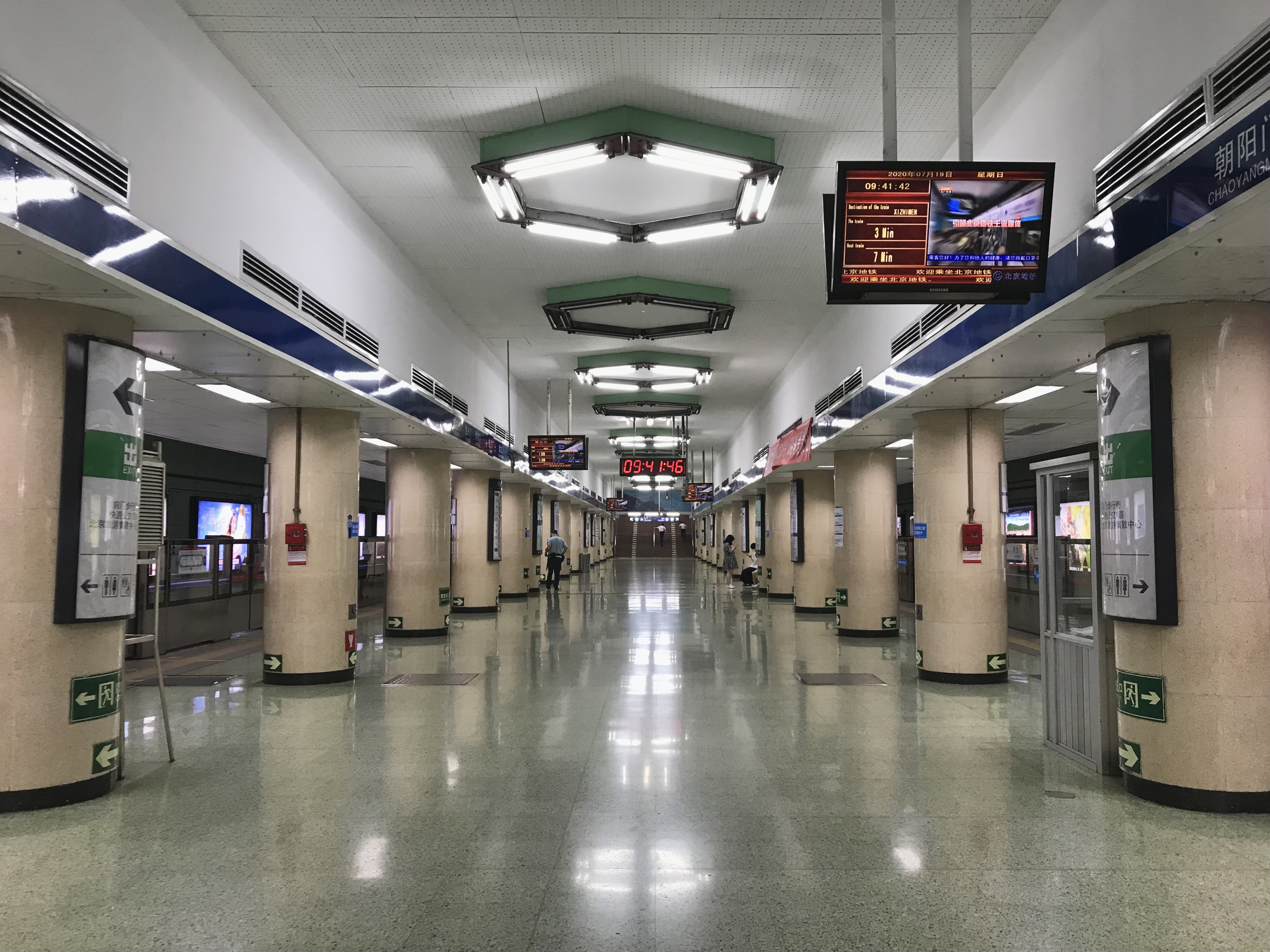
Qianmen Station

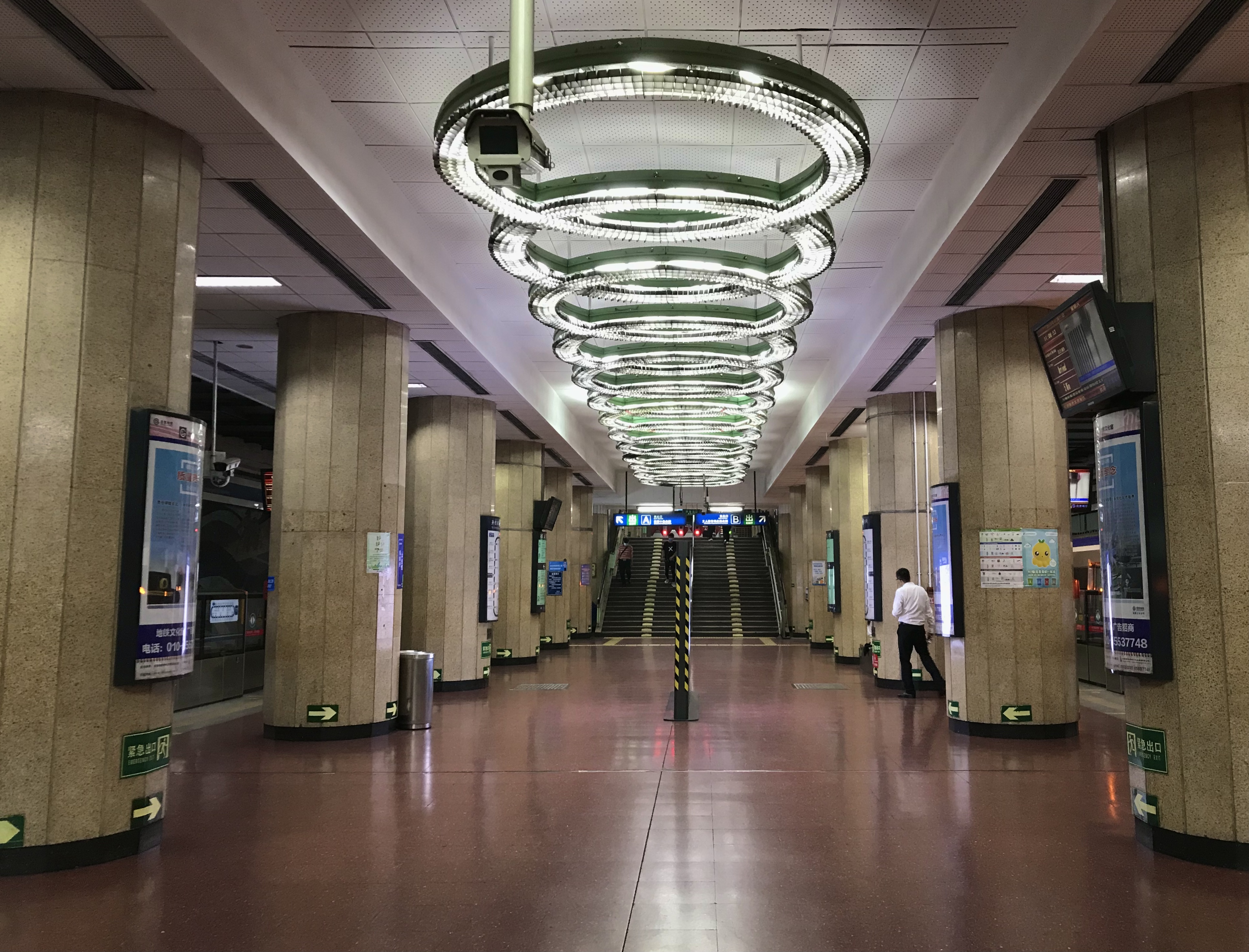
Dongsi Shitiao Station

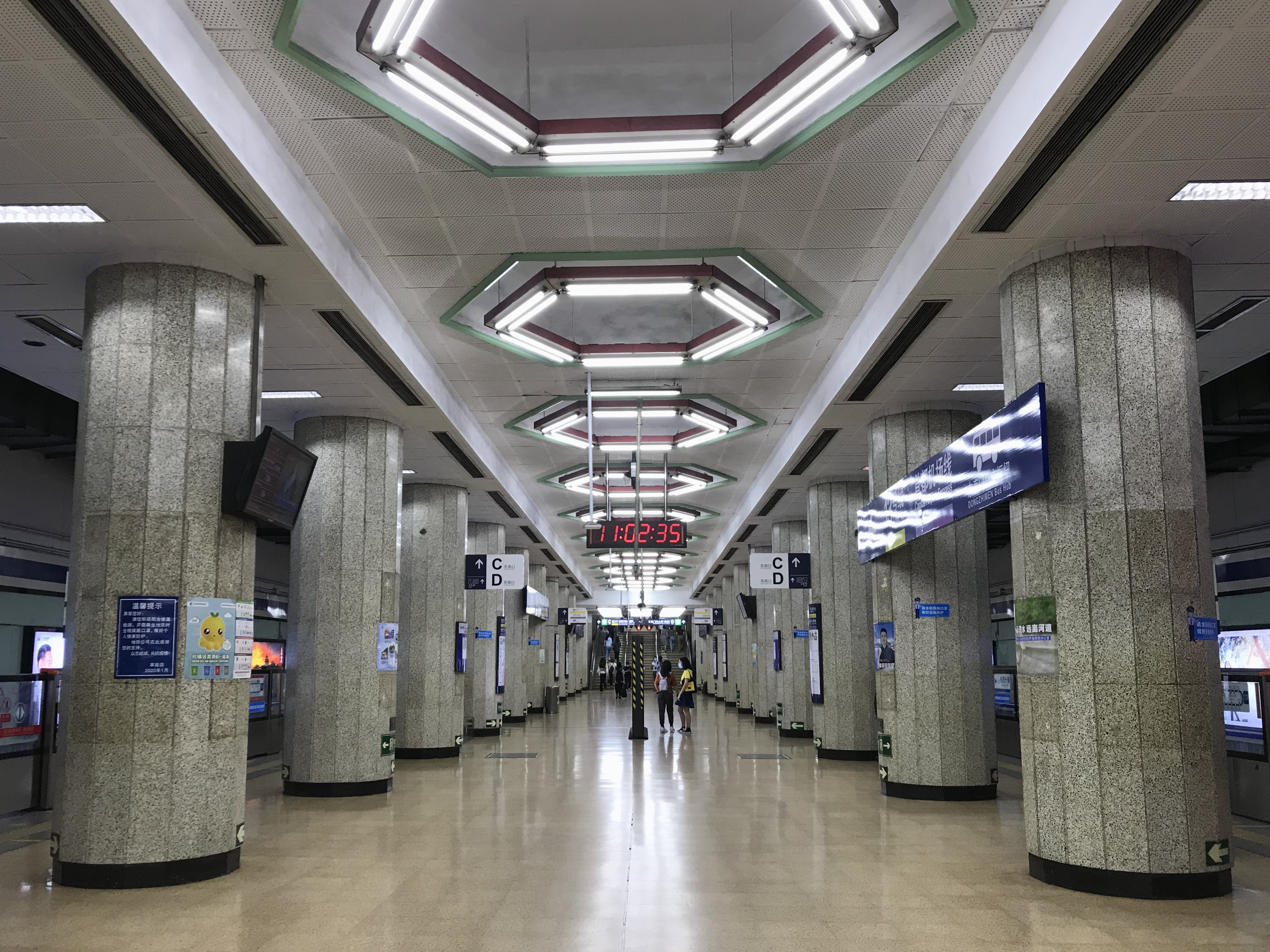
Dongzhimen Station

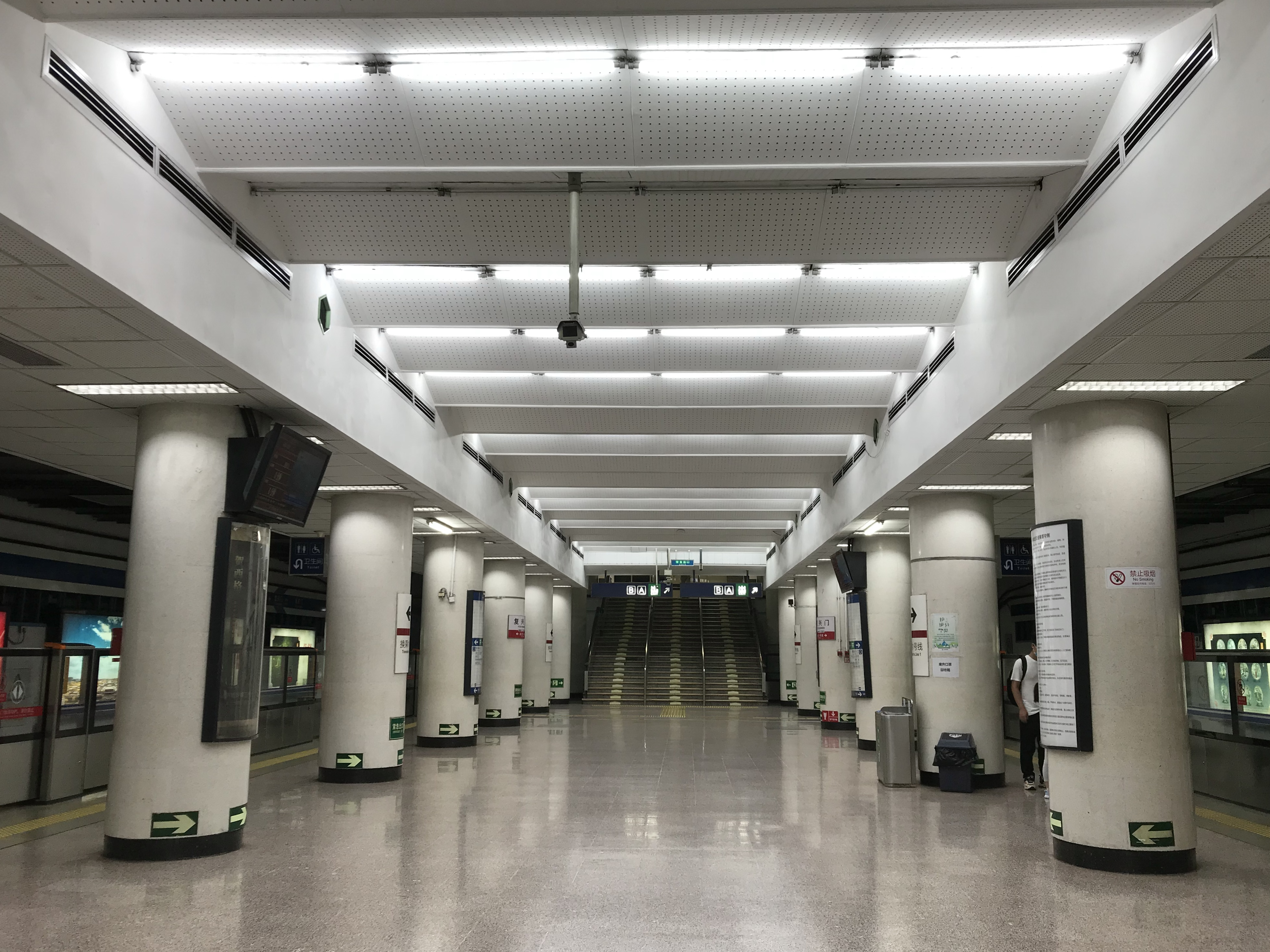
Fuxingmen Station

== History ==
On September 20, 1984, the first section Line 2 opened between Fuxingmen and Jianguomen. The line was a 16.1 km (10.0 mi) long upside down "horseshoe" along the west, north and east 2nd Ring Road, with 12 stations. On December 28, 1987, the line was extended from the terminals of Fuxingmen and Jianguomen, connecting the line with the original section of Line 1 between Changchun Jie and Beijing railway station. The completed line was called the "Beijing Subway Loop" and is 23 km (14 mi) long with 18 stations. Since January 2002, the line was renamed as "Line 2".

Segment	Commencement	Length	Station(s)	Name
Fuxingmen — Jianguomen	20 September 1984	16.1 km (10.00 mi)	12	Phase 2 (initial section)
Fuxingmen — Changchun Jie	28 December 1987	1.2 km (0.75 mi)	1	Line 1 & 2 realignment project
Beijing Railway Station — Jianguomen	28 December 1987	1.0 km (0.62 mi)	1	Line 1 & 2 realignment project
Changchun Jie — Beijing Railway Station	28 December 1987	6.1 km (3.79 mi)	6	Line 1 & 2 realignment project

== Depot ==
The rolling stock maintenance facility is located at Taipinghu Depot, near Jishuitan station.

== Rolling Stock ==
The line uses what retroactively were termed as type B rolling stock, although at the time they were simply the standard metro trains in China, early generation trains having dimensions closer to type C rolling stock.

=== Current ===
Model	Image	Manufacturer	Year built	Amount in service	Fleet numbers
DKZ16		CRRC Changchun Railway Vehicles; Beijing Subway Rolling Stock Equipment	2006	50	T401–T450

=== Former ===
Model	Image	Manufacturer	Year built	Years in service	Number Made	Fleet numbers (Before 1996)	Fleet numbers (After 1996)	Notes
DK6		CRRC Changchun Railway Vehicles	1979	1984–2008	4	501	T1193–T1194	Cars T1193–T1194 were linked with DK19 cars T1191–T1192 and T1195–T1196 in 1996.
DK8		CRRC Changchun Railway Vehicles	1982	1984–2008	52	401–413	T101–T104, T106–T108, T1093–T1094, T3023, T3024, T304	Some cars were retrofitted with GTO chopper controls.
DK9		CRRC Changchun Railway Vehicles	1983	1984–2008	4	502	T1191–T1192, T1195–T1196	Linked with DK6 cars T1193–T1194 in 1996.
DK16		CRRC Changchun Railway Vehicles	1987–1989	1987–2009	115	430–441, 4421–4423	T1091–T1092, T1095–T1096, T110–T118, T120–T122, T124–T127, T1281–T1285, T3021–T3022, T3025–T3026, T303	Several cars were retrofitted with GTO chopper controls.
DK19		CRRC Changchun Railway Vehicles	1989	1989–2008	1	4424	T1286	Linked with DK16 cars T1281–T1285.
DKZ1		CRRC Changchun Railway Vehicles	1987	1987–1998	3	701	Unknown	Transferred to line 13 in 2002.
BD1		Beijing Subway Rolling Stock Equipment	1990–1992	1994–2008	24	308–311	T129–T132	
BD11		Beijing Subway Rolling Stock Equipment	2000	2004	12	—N/a	T305–T306	
M		Tokyu Car Corporation	1984	1984–1995	3	—N/a		Transferred to line 13 in 2002.
