= Geological Museum of China =

- 中国地质博物馆
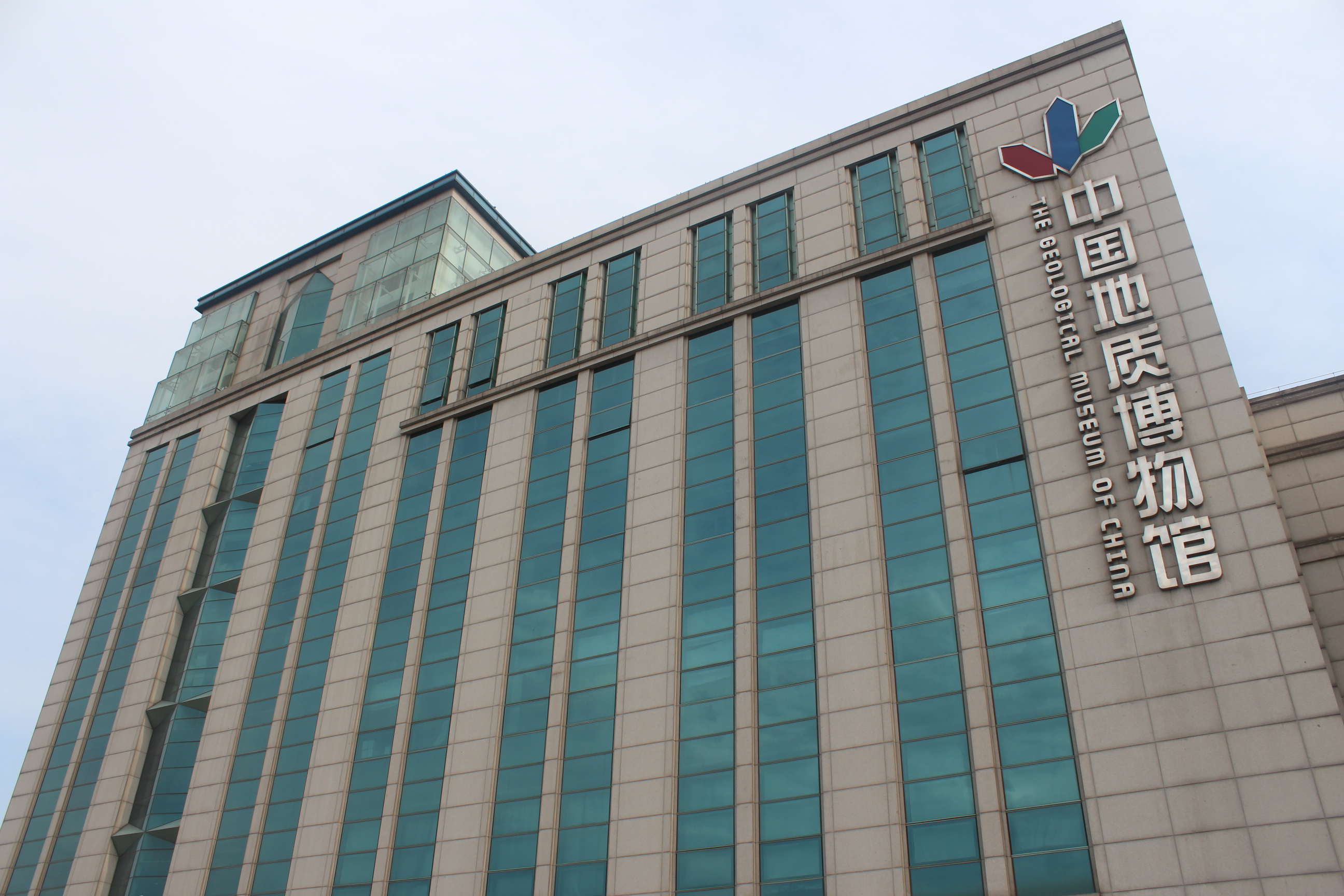
- The front of the building.
- Former name: Geological and Mineral Museum
- Established: October 1, 1959
- Location: Beijing, China
- Coordinates: 39°55′19″N 116°21′55″E
- Type: Geology Museum
- Director: Jia Yueming
- Public transit access: Xisi station 4
- Website: http://www.gmc.org.cn/

The Geological Museum of China (Chinese: 中国地质博物馆), built in 1916, is a geological museum, boasting 200 thousand specimens.

A rock greeting visitors at the main entrance.

This museum is located in the Xisi area of Beijing and opened on October 1, 1959. It is the earliest geological scientific museum of China.

At present, the Geological Museum of China has more than 100,000 geological specimens. Many of them are precious items reputed as "National Treasures", such as "the Giant Shandong Dinosaur" (Shantungosaurus) fossil, the most complete dinosaur fossils extant in the world excavated from Liaoning; the fossils of primitive birds that were found in the west of Liaoning Province, which has the essential values to the research on birds of the area; the teeth fossils of Yunnan Yuanmou Man, which shifts the appearance of human beings in China to a much more earlier time; the stoneware, stone pearls, bone needles and bone decoration unearthed from the site of the Upper Cave man at Zhoukoudian in Beijing; a cinnabar crystal of 237 grams that is called as "King of Cinnabar"; and more than 60 new mineral products that were found in China, and so on.

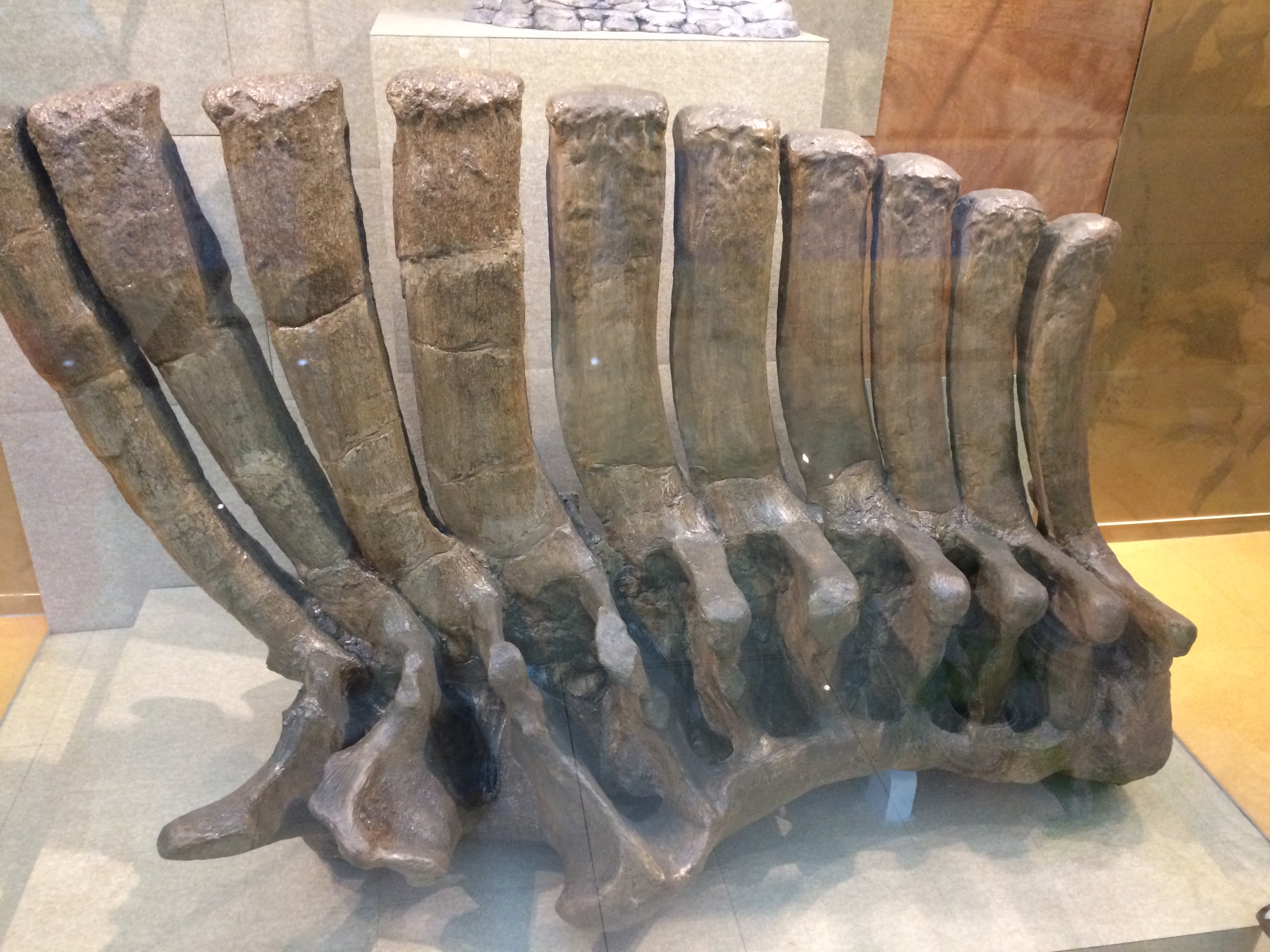
Sacrum of Shantungosaurus on display.

Basic displays of the museum are composed of five exhibition halls, namely, the exhibition halls of geological resource, global history, stratum paleontology, mineral rocks and diamond, with an exhibition area of 2,500 square meters. The hall of geological resource introduces in different catalogues and classifications the abundant mineral products and other geological resources in China; the hall of global history introduces earth formation and construction, earth inner motive power geological action, earth outer power geological action and earth washing action; in the stratum paleontology hall, there are the special exhibitions of Zhendan biome, insect fossils, fish fossils, egg fossils, and the Upper Cave Man—ancient creatures and their characteristics of different geological eras.

== Stratum Paleontology Hall ==
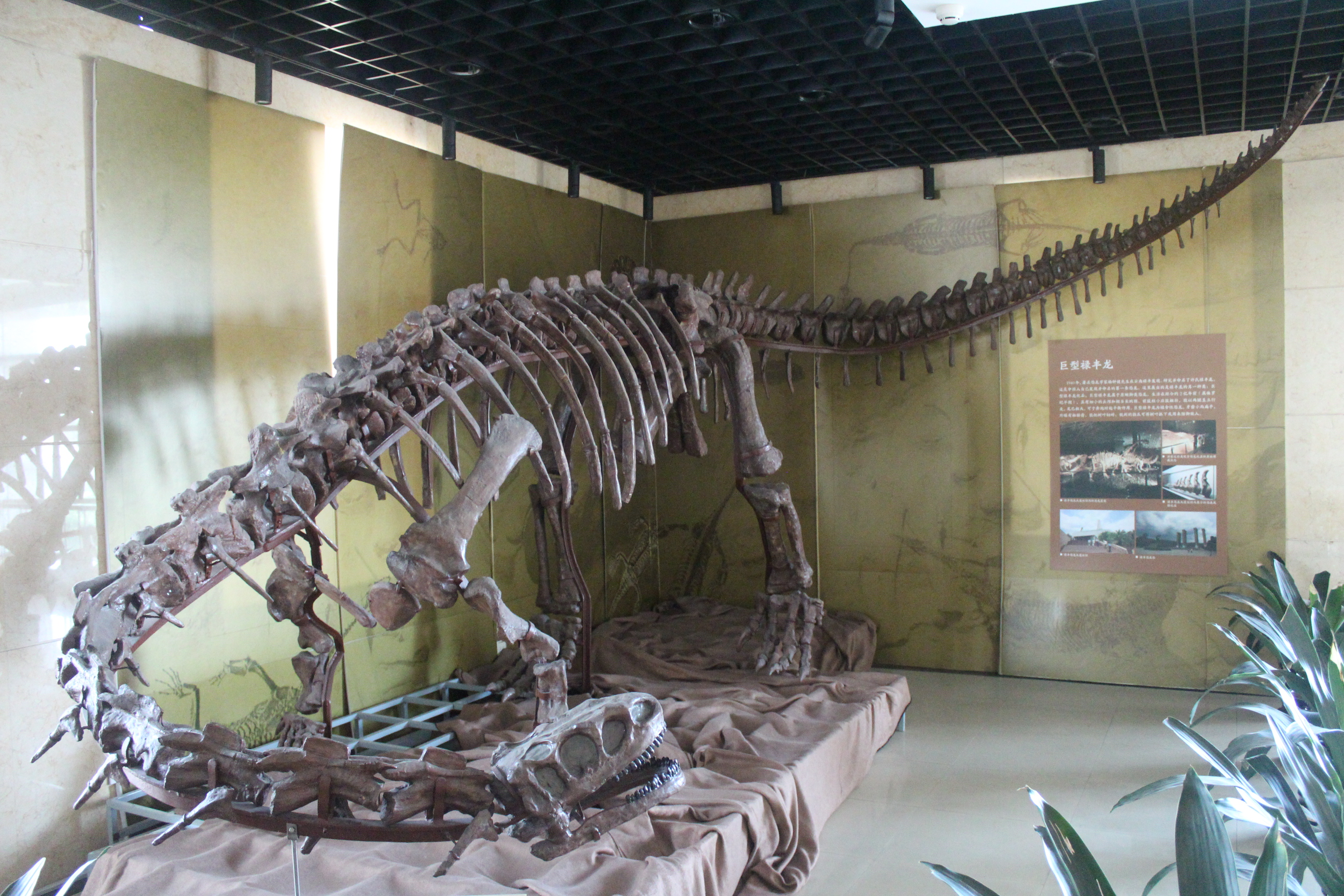
Skeletal mount of Lufengosaurus magnus outside the Stratum Paleontology Hall.

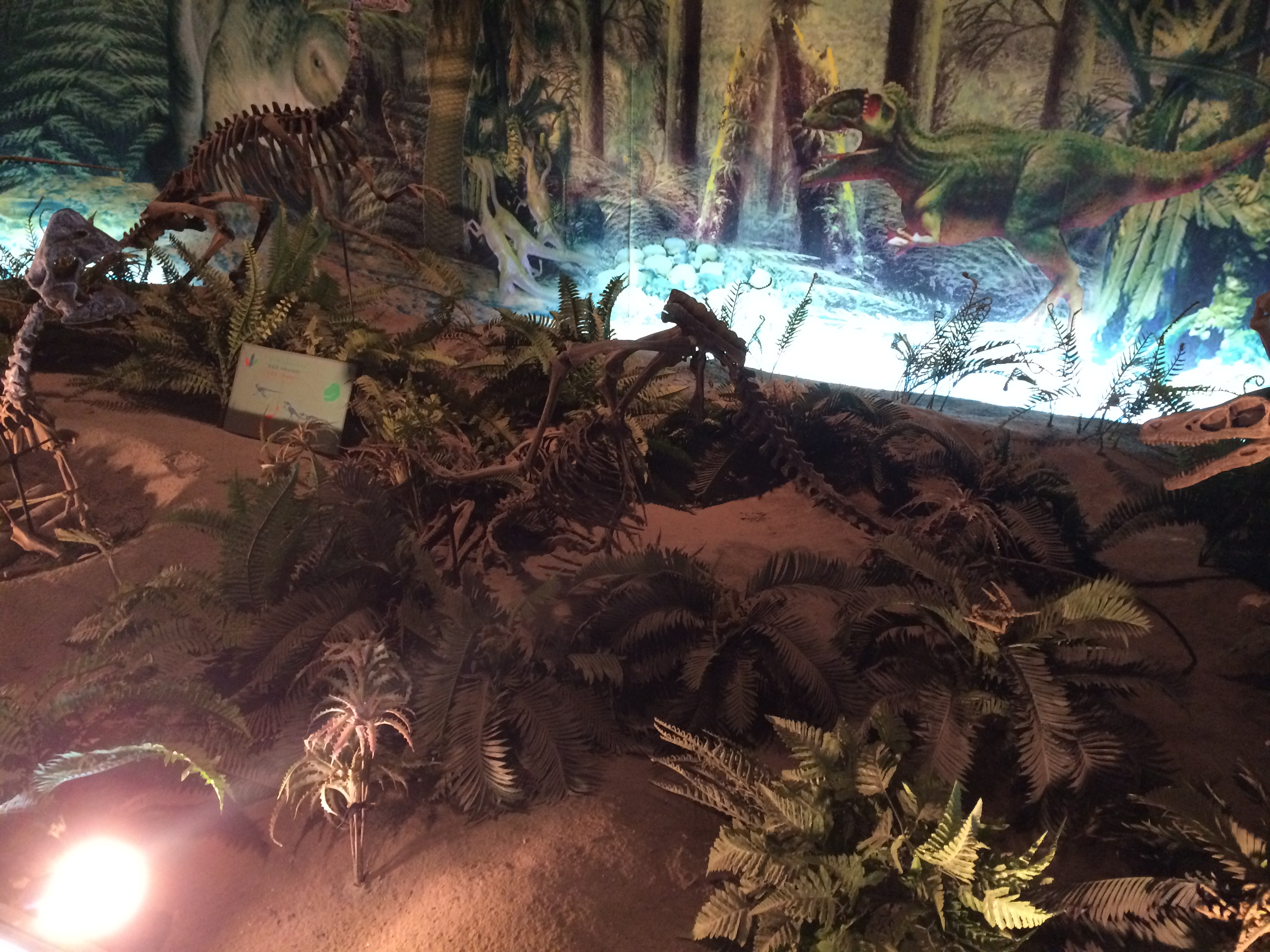
Velociraptor and Oviraptor skeletal cast mounts in the Stratum Paleontology Hall.

On the third floor of the museum, a Lufengosaurus skeleton is mounted next to a display case holding a fossil of Shantungosaurus. The paleontology hall itself is labeled with an image of a trilobite. The first third of the gallery showcases many fossils from the Cambrian explosion and fossilized plants. As the hall turns, a Cymbospondylus fossil is mounted on the wall. A small circular gallery is covered on the walls by a mural, and the glass floor contains many dinosaur bones. As the hall turns back, a partial dinosaur skeleton labeled "Anchisaurus sinensis" is displayed on the wall. The next section of the gallery puts on display a scenario from Cretaceous Mongolia, mounting several Velociraptor specimens harassing a nesting Oviraptor. A Tyrannosaurus rex skull cast is mounted on the wall. In many display cases encircling this section, specimens and casts of beautifully preserved dinosaur and bird specimens from Liaoning are displayed. In another display case, a bone and teeth of a tyrannosaurid labeled "Tyrannosaurus zhuchengensis" are set. Multiple dinosaur eggs are also displayed, including a pair of Macroelongatoolithus eggs. At the end of the hall, several artifacts from the Peking Man and Upper Cave Man site in Zhoukoudian are exhibited.

== Gallery ==
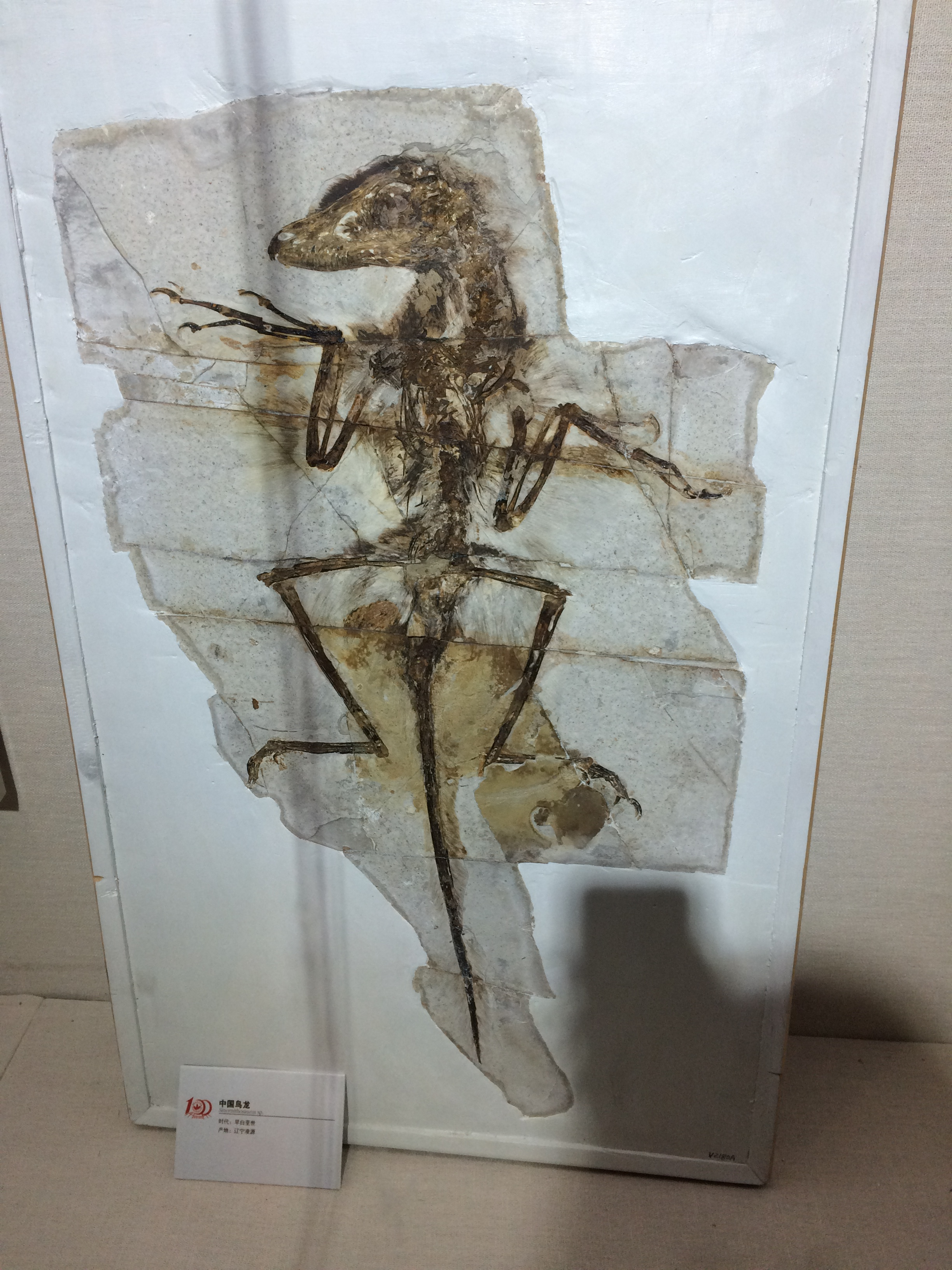
NGMC 91 ("Dave"), on the fourth floor of the museum.

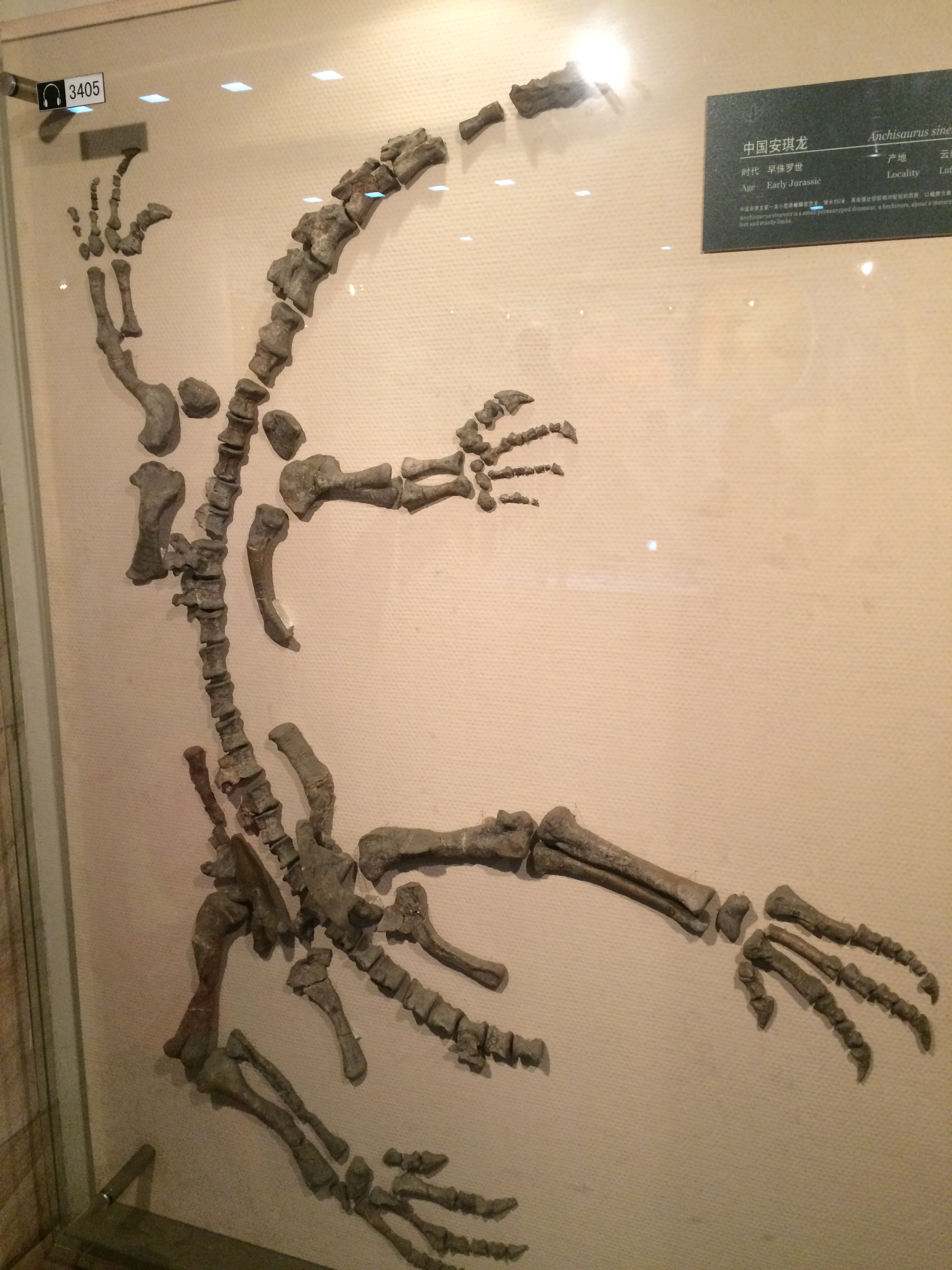
A specimen of Gyposaurus sinensis.

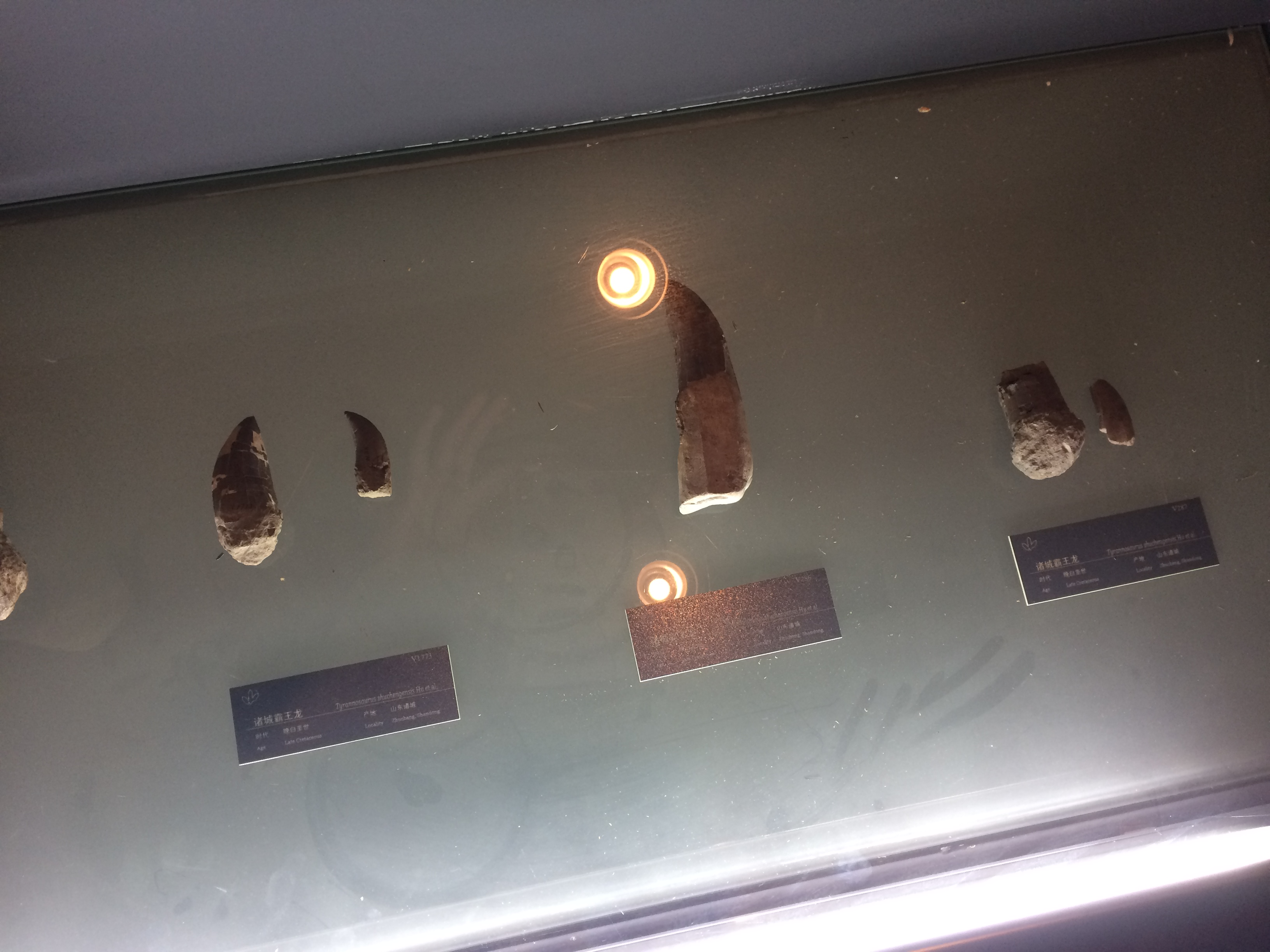
Multiple teeth of "Tyrannosaurus zhuchengensis".

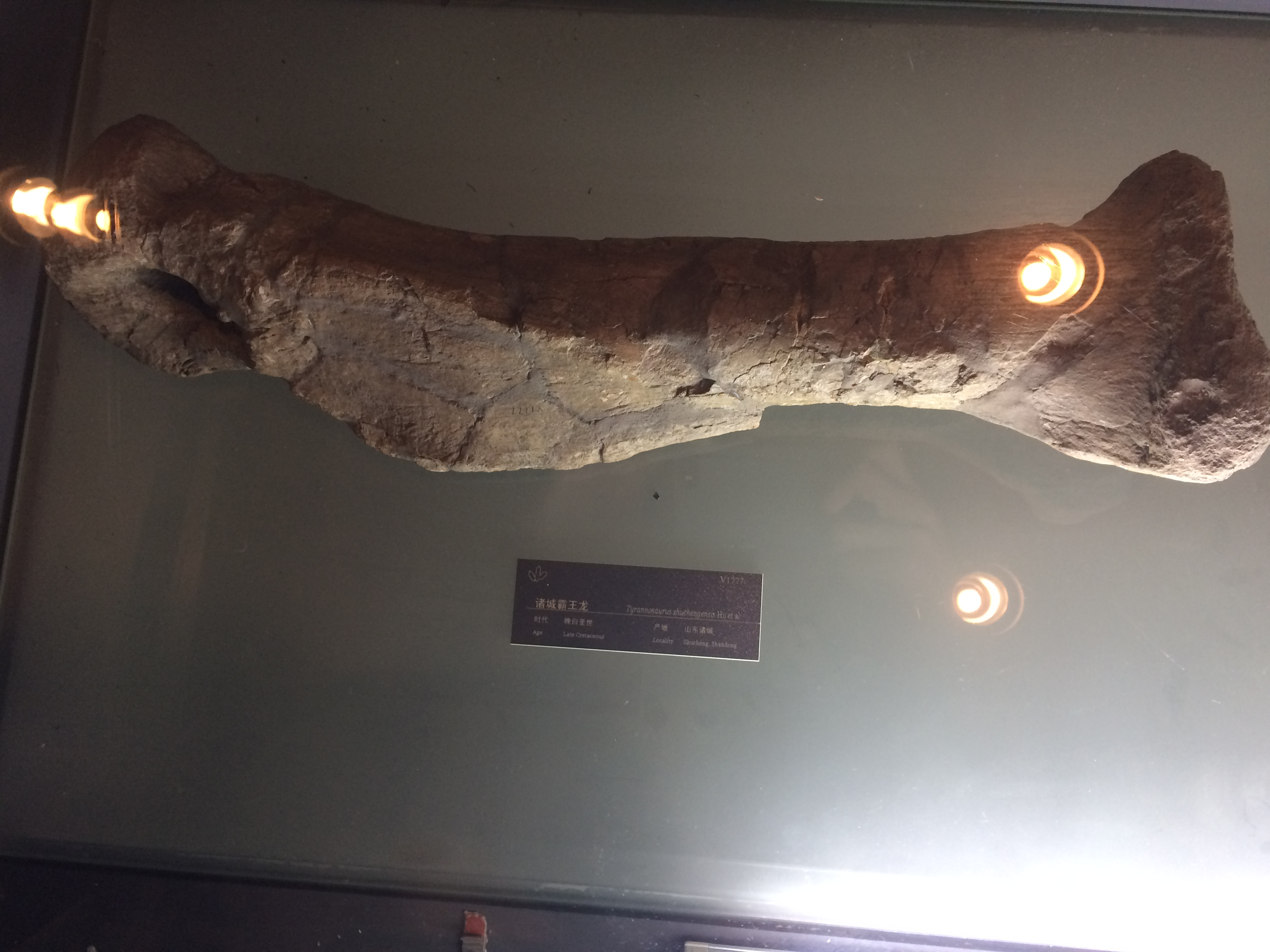
The metatarsal of "Tyrannosaurus zhuchengensis".

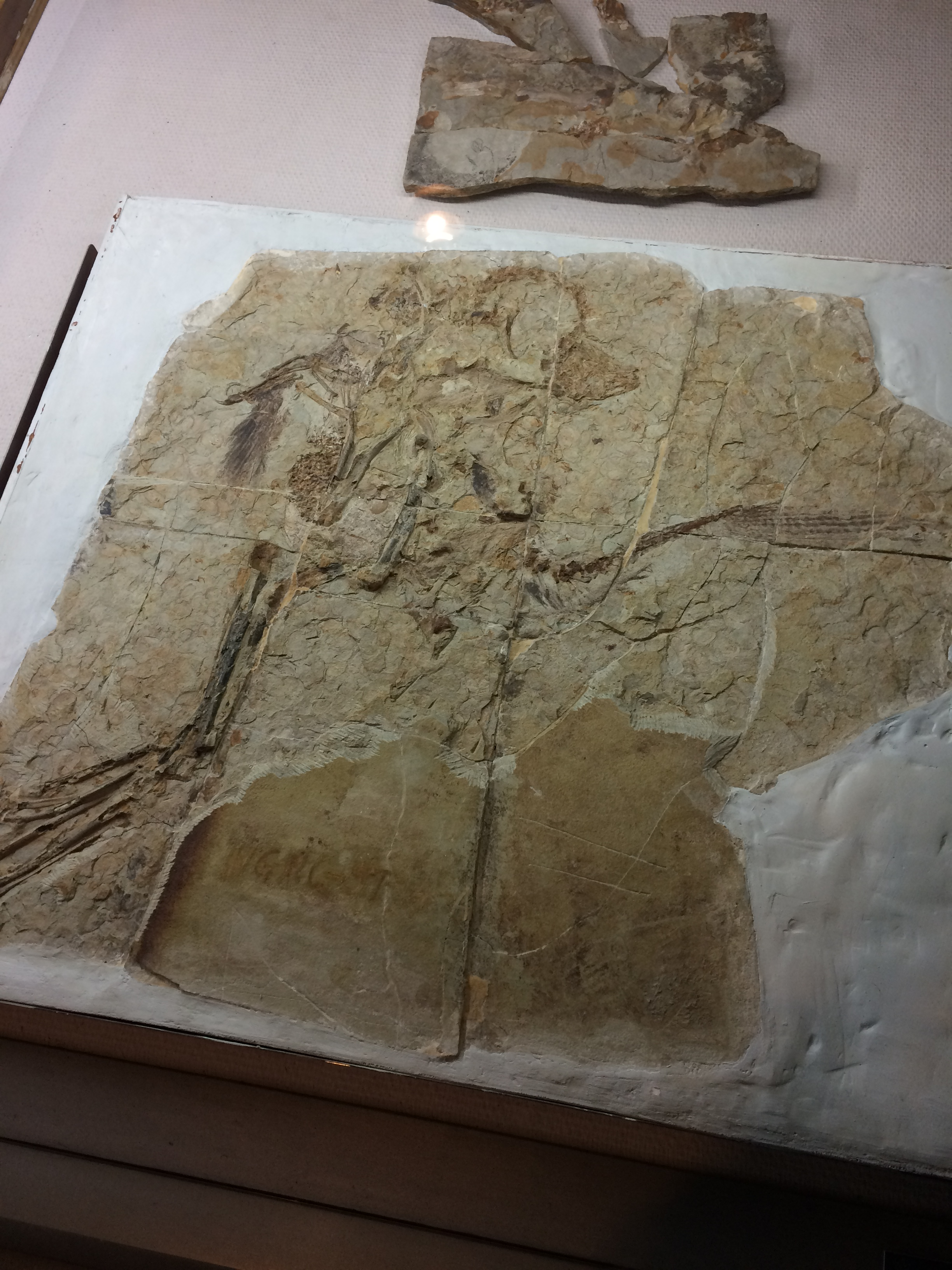
The holotype specimen of Caudipteryx.

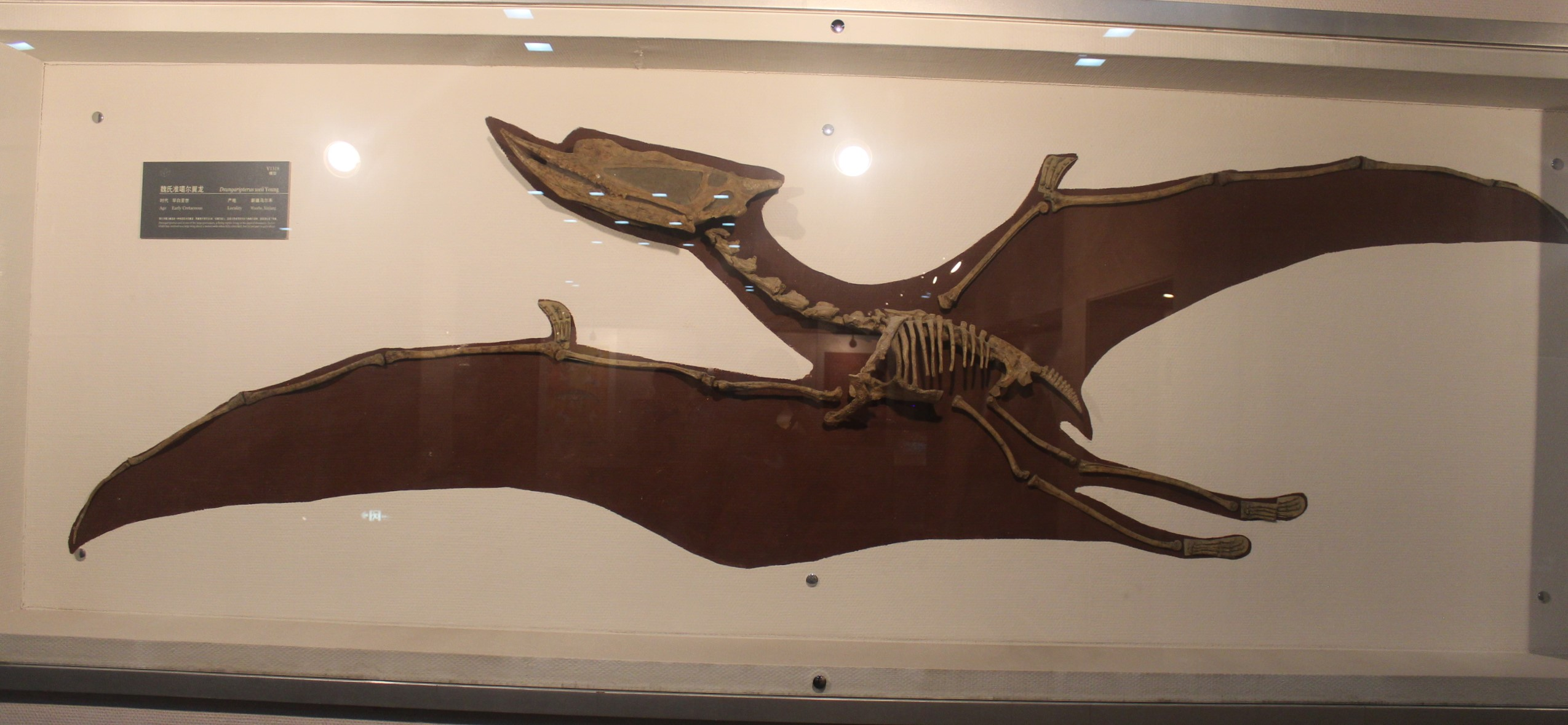
A Dsungaripterus weii skeleton mounted on the wall of the Stratum Paleontology Hall.

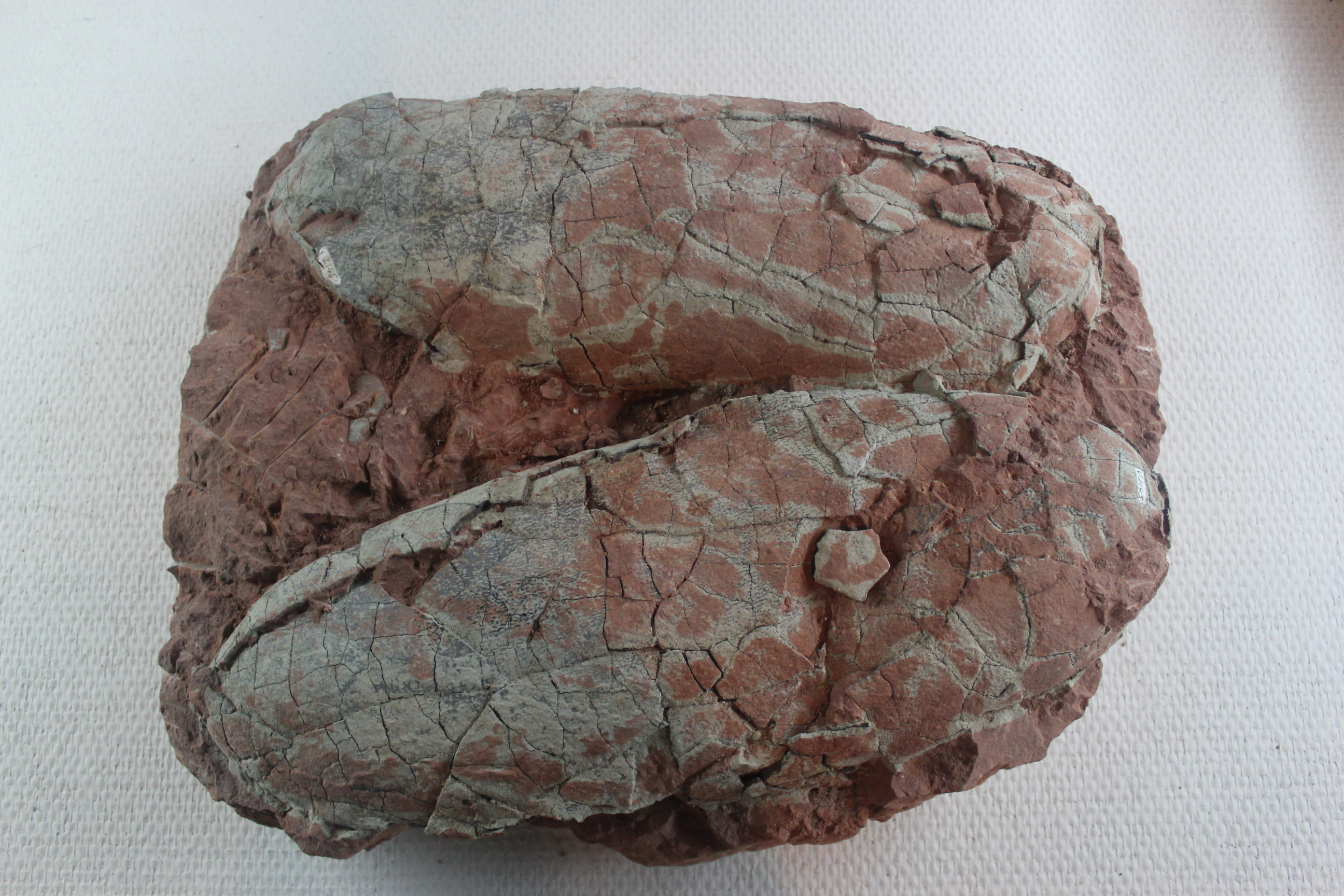
Macroelongatoolithus eggs on display in the museum.

== See also ==
- List of museums in China
- China Geological Survey Bureau
- China University of Geosciences
