= Lingjing =

Lingjing may refer to several places in the People's Republic of China:

== Beijing ==
- Lingjing Hutong (灵境), a hutong in Xidan district
- Lingjing Hutong station (灵境), a subway station located near to the hutong

== Guangxi province ==
- Lingjing, Guangxi (岭景), located in Teng county

== Henan province ==
- Lingjing, Henan (灵井), located in Xuchang, central Henan
