= Xidan station =

Beijing Subway interchange station

Xidan 西单
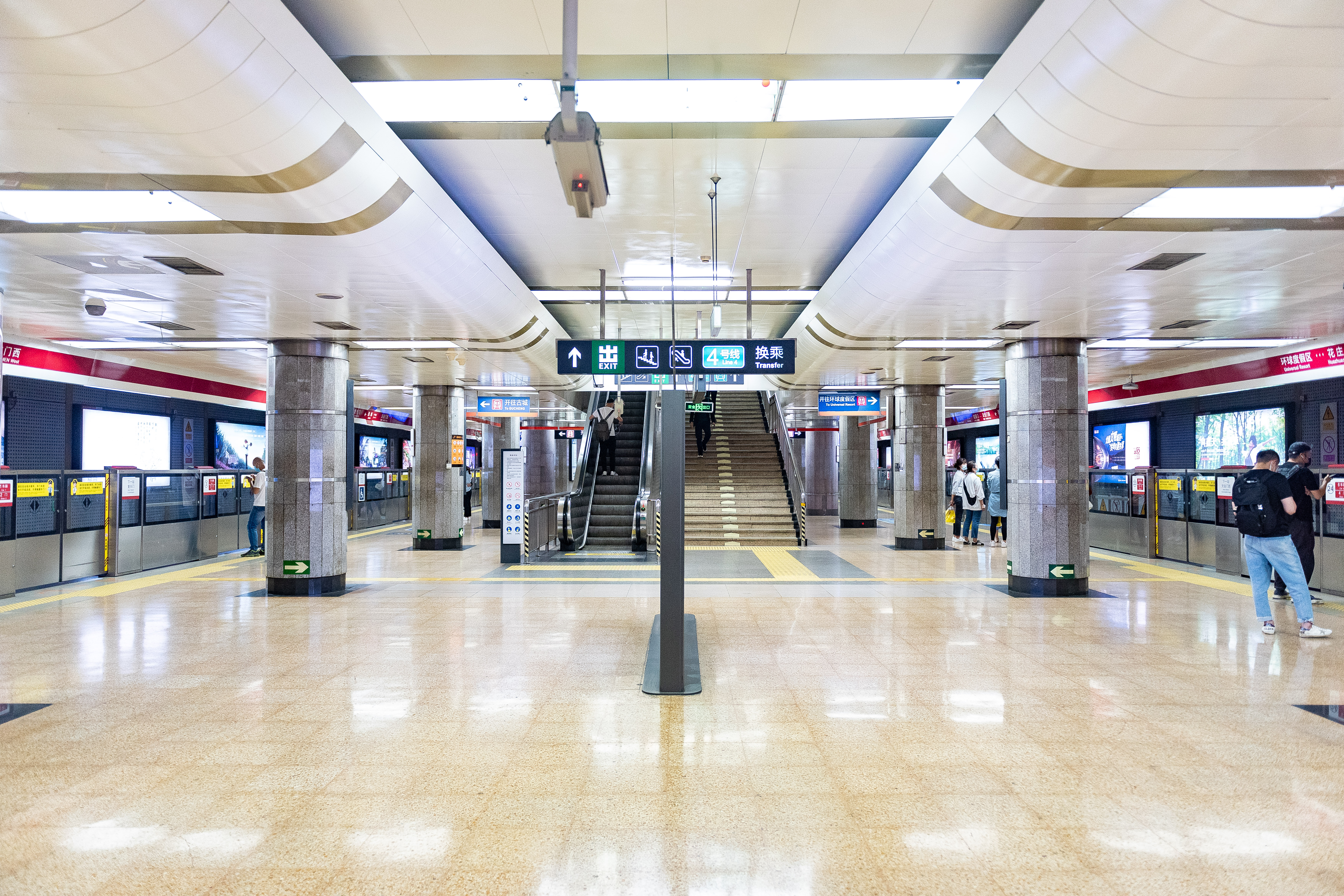
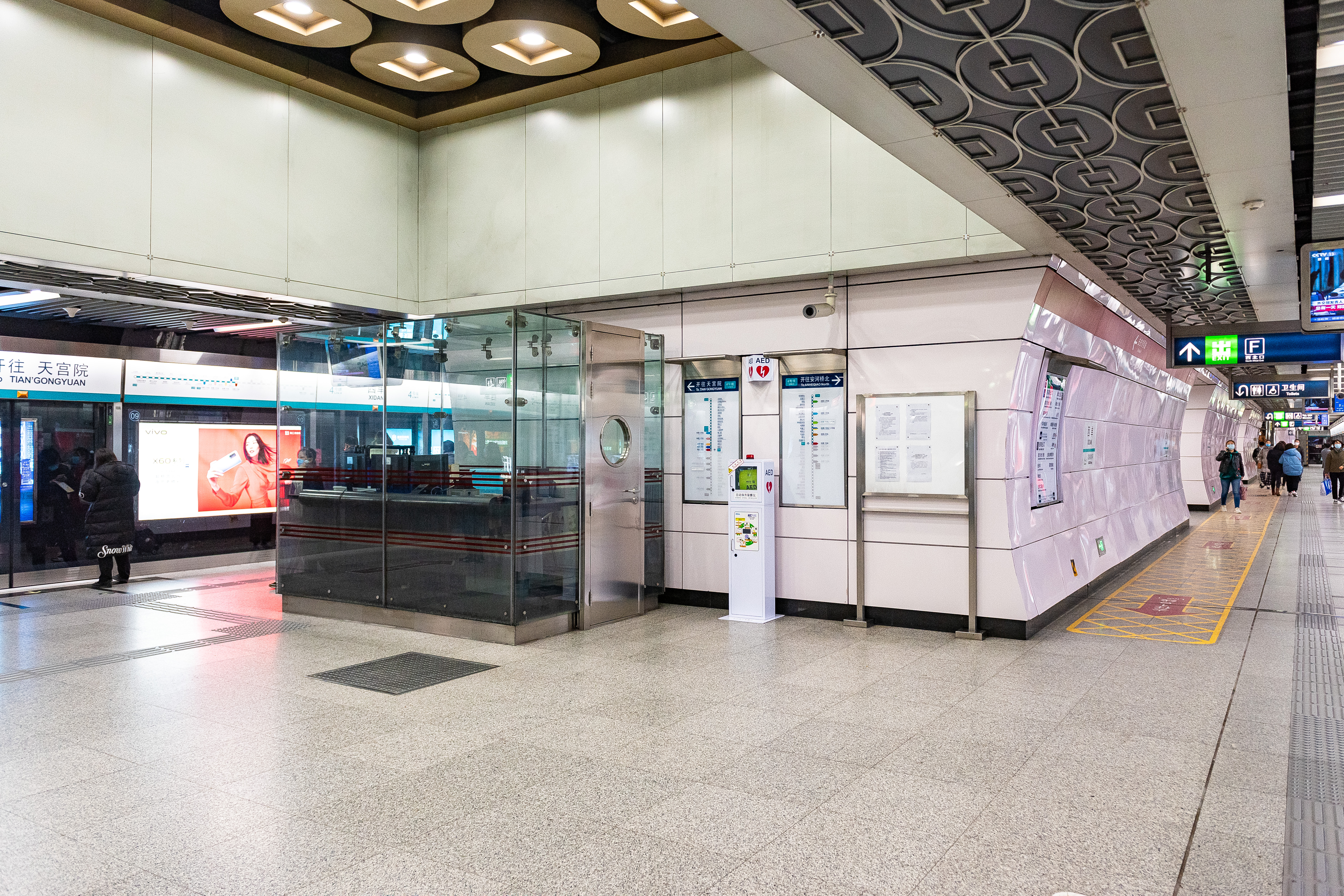
- Line 1 platform Line 4 platform

General information
- Location: Fuxingmen Inner Street / West Chang'an Avenue and Xidan North Street / Xuanwumen Inner Street; Xidan, Xicheng District, Beijing; China
- Coordinates: 39°54′27″N 116°22′27″E
- Operator: Beijing Mass Transit Railway Operation Corporation Limited (line 1); Beijing MTR Corporation Limited (line 4)
- Lines: Line 1; Line 4
- Platforms: 4 (1 island platform and 1 split island platform)
- Tracks: 4

Construction
- Structure type: Underground
- Accessible: Yes

Other information
- Station code: 115 (line 1)

History
- Opened: December 12, 1992; 33 years ago (Line 1); September 28, 2009; 17 years ago (Line 4)

Services
Preceding station	Beijing Subway	Following station
Fuxingmen towards Pingguoyuan	Line 1	Tian'anmenxi towards Universal Resort
Lingjing Hutong towards Anheqiaobei	Line 4	Xuanwu Men towards Tiangong Yuan
Location
- Location within Beijing

Xidan Station (Chinese: 西单站; pinyin: Xīdān Zhàn) is a station on Line 1 and Line 4 of the Beijing Subway located in the Xidan commercial district. The station on average has 60,000 entrances and exits per day. It was the terminus of Line 1 until it was extended eastward to Sihui Dong (E) on September 28, 1999.

== Station layout ==
Both the line 1 and 4 stations have underground island platforms.

== Exits ==
There are 11 exits, numbered A, B, C, D, E, F_{1}, F_{2}, G, H, J_{1}, and J_{2}. Exits C, D, and J_{1} are accessible.

== Gallery ==
Line 1 concoruse

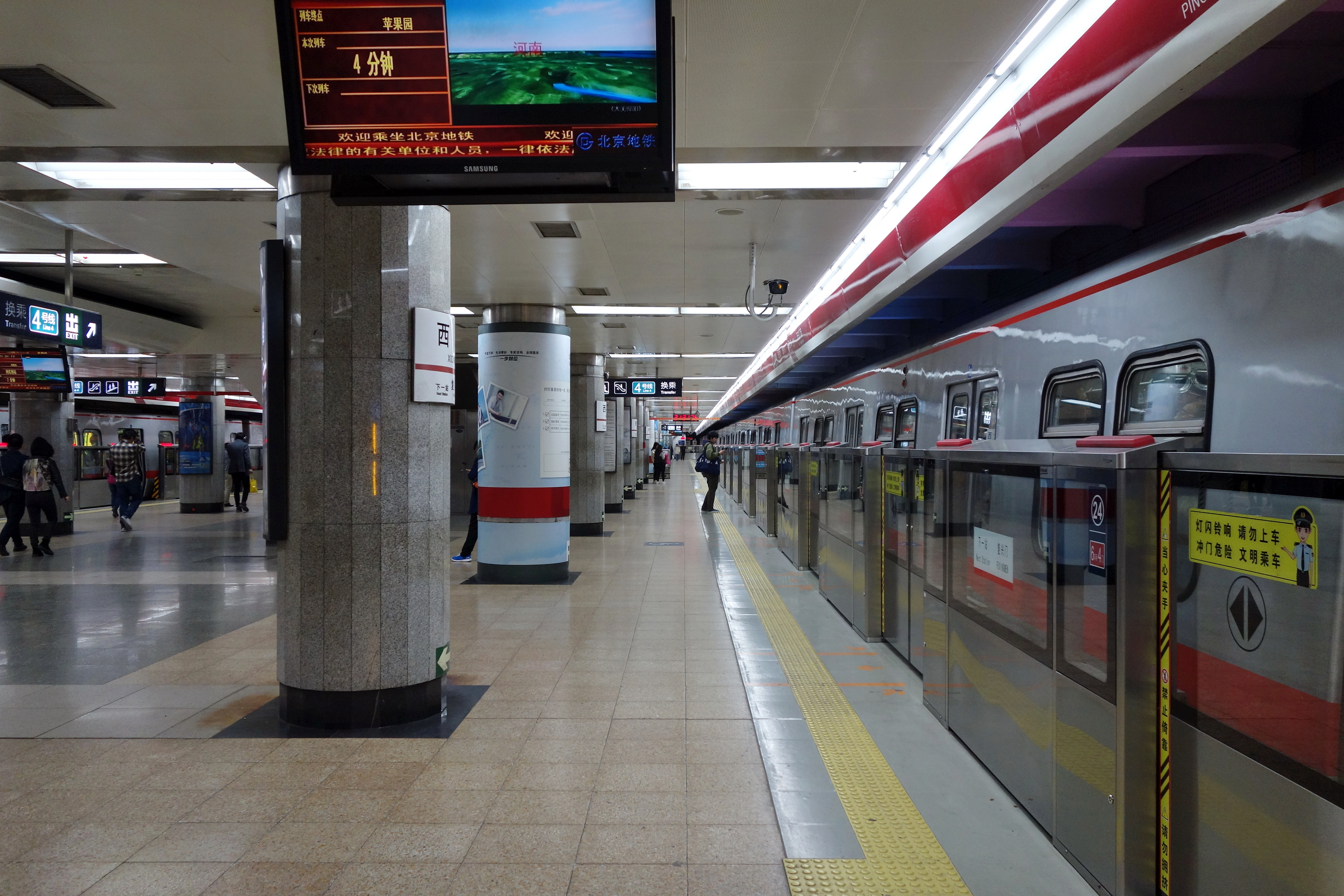
Line 1 platform (October 2018)

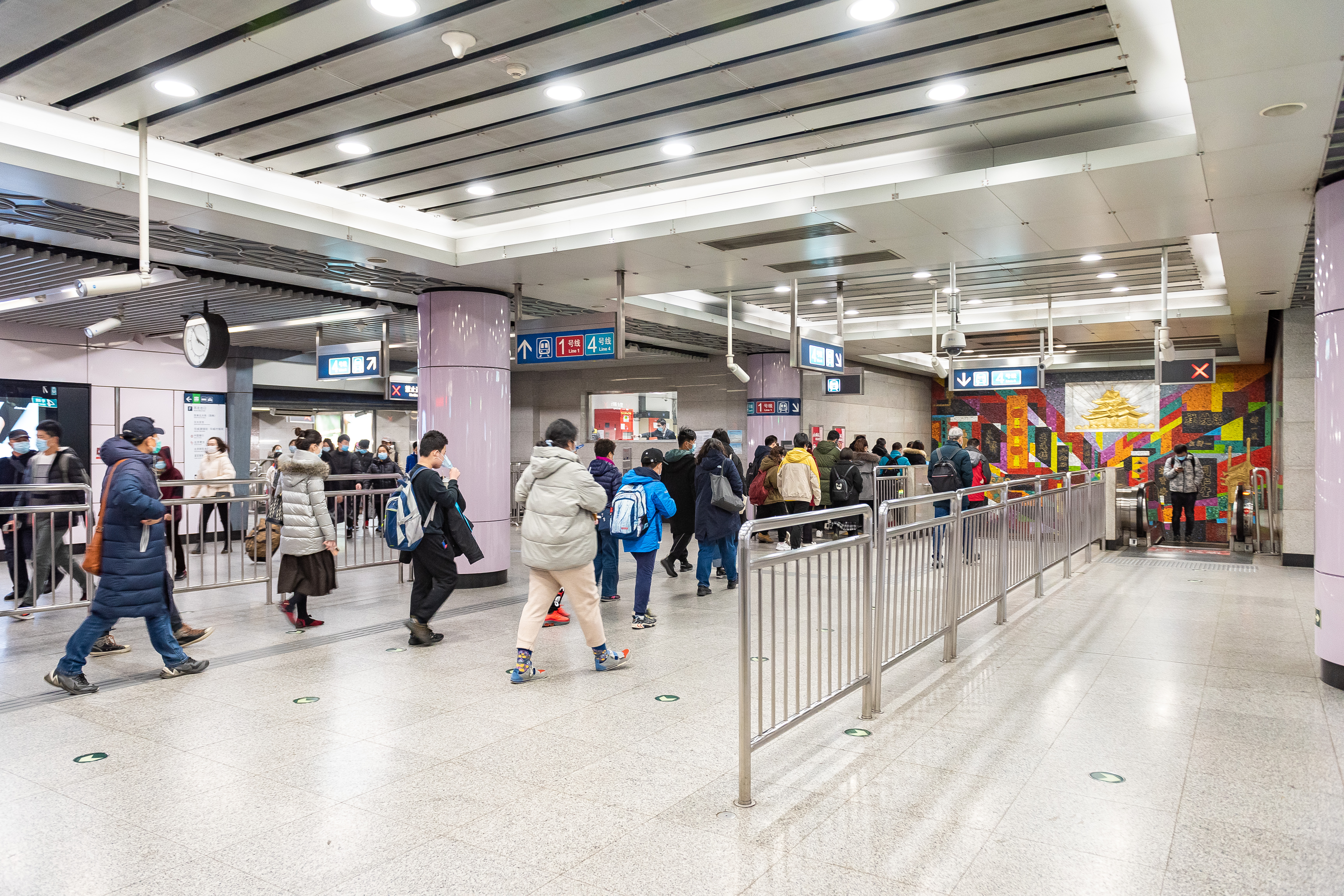
Line 4 north concourse

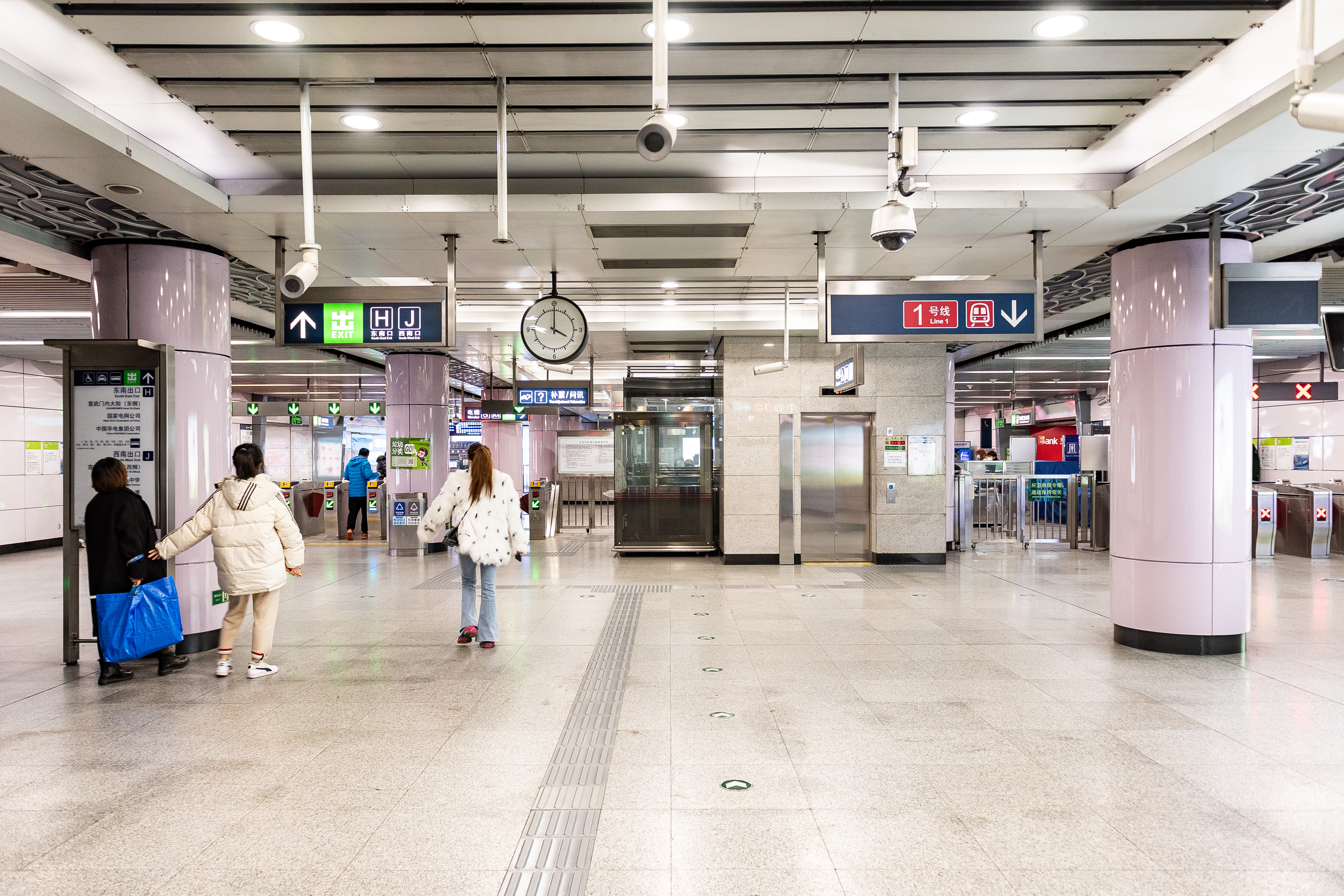
Line 4 south concourse
