= Xisi =

Neighborhood in Beijing, China

Coordinates: 39.9230°N 116.3742°E

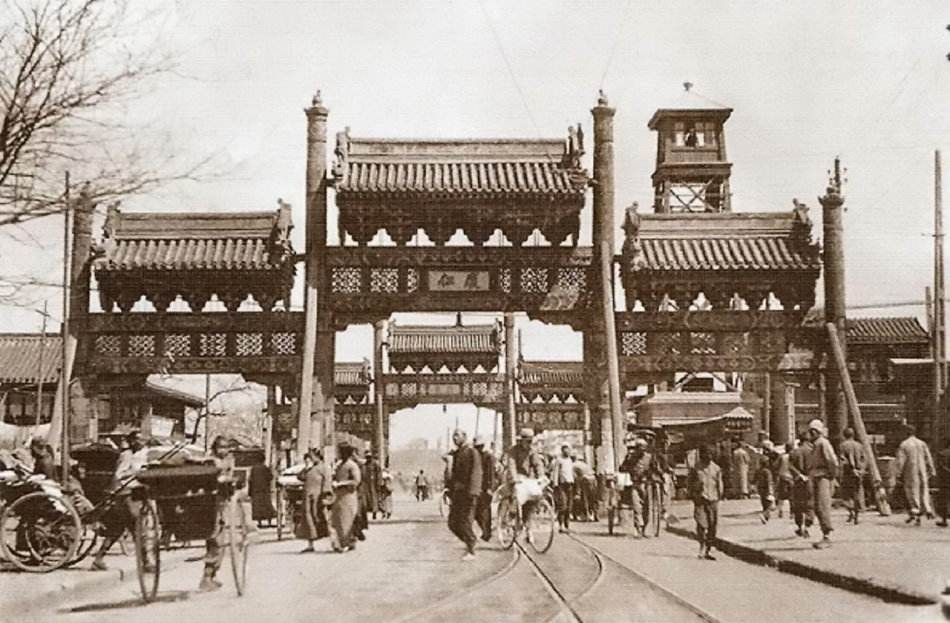
Xisi and its sign gates in 1918.

Xisi (Chinese: 西四; pinyin: Xīsì) literally, the "Western Four" or the "Western Quadrangle", is the name of an intersection and surrounding neighborhood in Xicheng District, Beijing. Xisi, at the intersection of what is now Xisi Avenue and Fuchengmen Inner Avenue, dates to the Yuan Dynasty and was named after the four paifangs, Chinese sign gates, that marked the location. The intersection was known as the Western Four Sign Gates or "Western Four" for short. To the east, in Dongcheng District, there was another intersection with four sign gates called Dongsi or the Eastern Four. The sign gates at Xisi were removed in 1950s but the location name remains. Today, the Xisi Station on Line 4 of the Beijing Subway is located underneath the intersection.

== See also ==
- Dongsi Subdistrict, Beijing
- Xidan
- Dongdan
