= Xidan =

Region in Xicheng, Beijing

Coordinates: 39°54′27.21″N 116°22′4.08″E

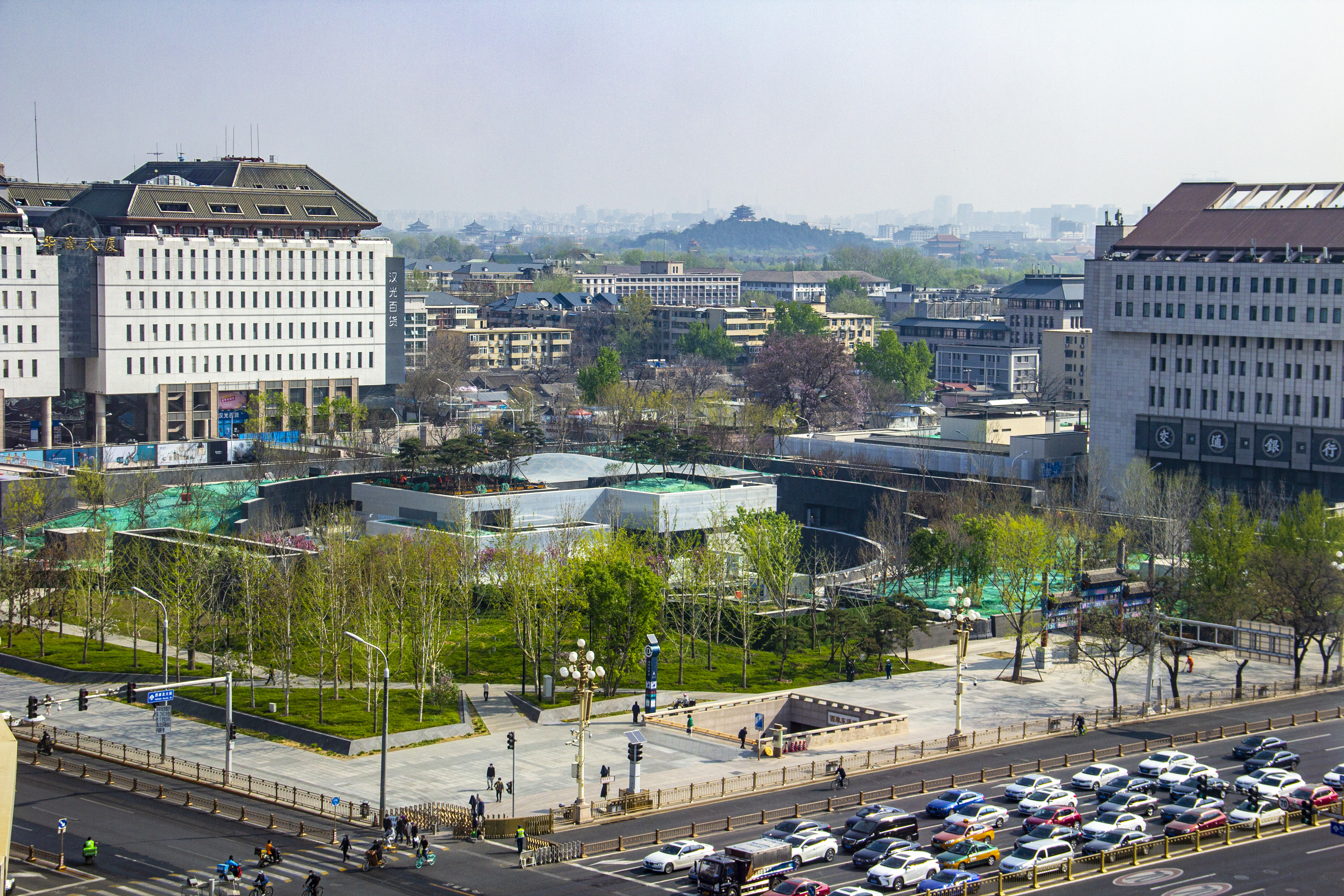
Xidan Culture Square

Xidan (Chinese: 西单; Pinyin: Xīdān) is a major traditional commercial area in Beijing, China. It is located in the Xicheng District.

The Xidan commercial district incorporates the Xidan Culture Square, North Xidan Street, as well as many supermarkets and department stores. The Xidan Cultural Square is the largest venue for cultural events with shopping nearby in downtown Beijing.

== Area ==
Xidan occupies around 80 hectares (197.7 acres) within the Xicheng District.

== Name ==
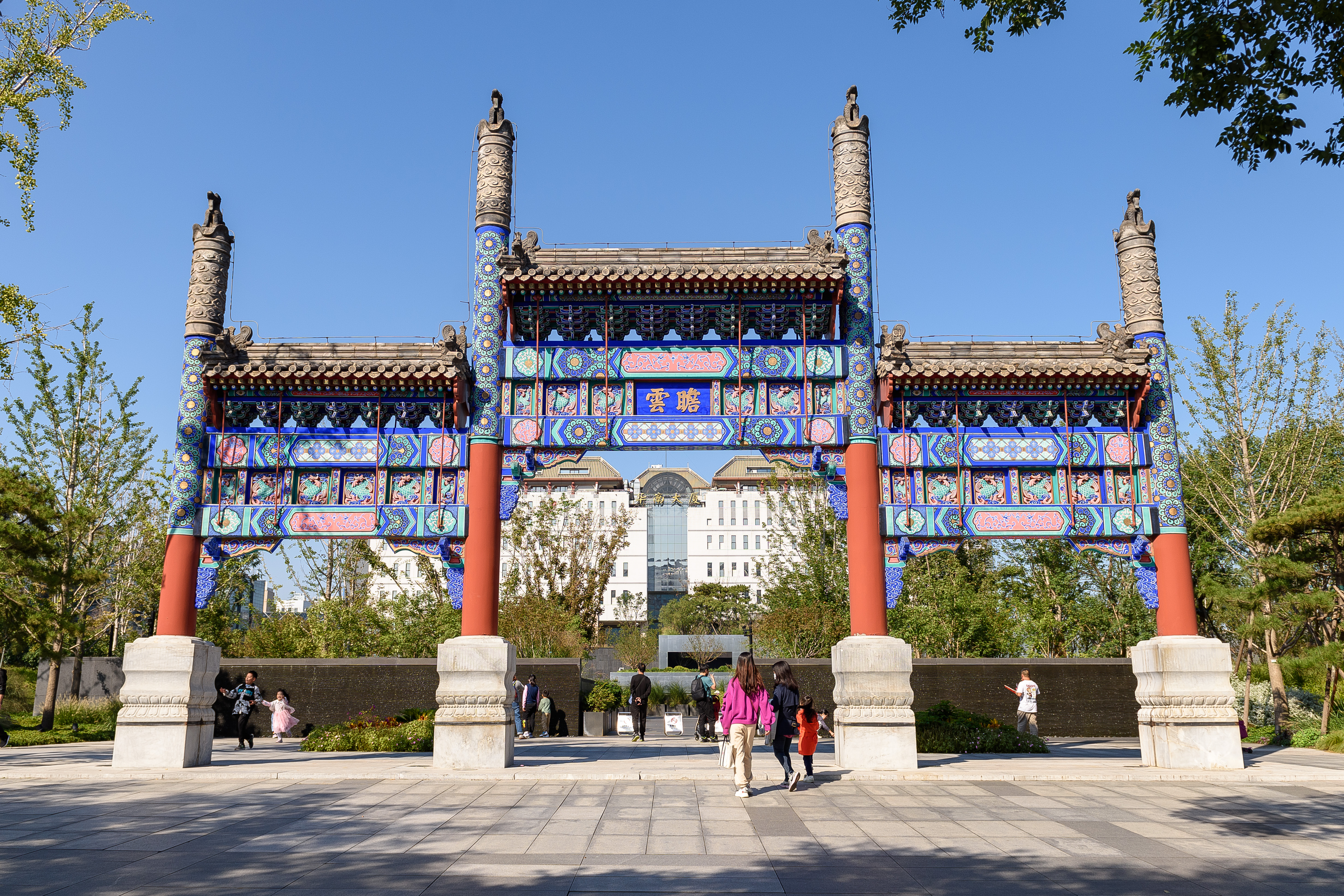
The current "Zhanyun" paifang in Xidan

The name Xidan (literally, "West Single") came from the paifang that existed on one of the streets there. In this context, the name "Xidan" refers to the single (单) paifang that existed on the west side (西) of the city.

The paifang was rebuilt in 2008, and now stands at the Xidan Culture Square.

== History ==
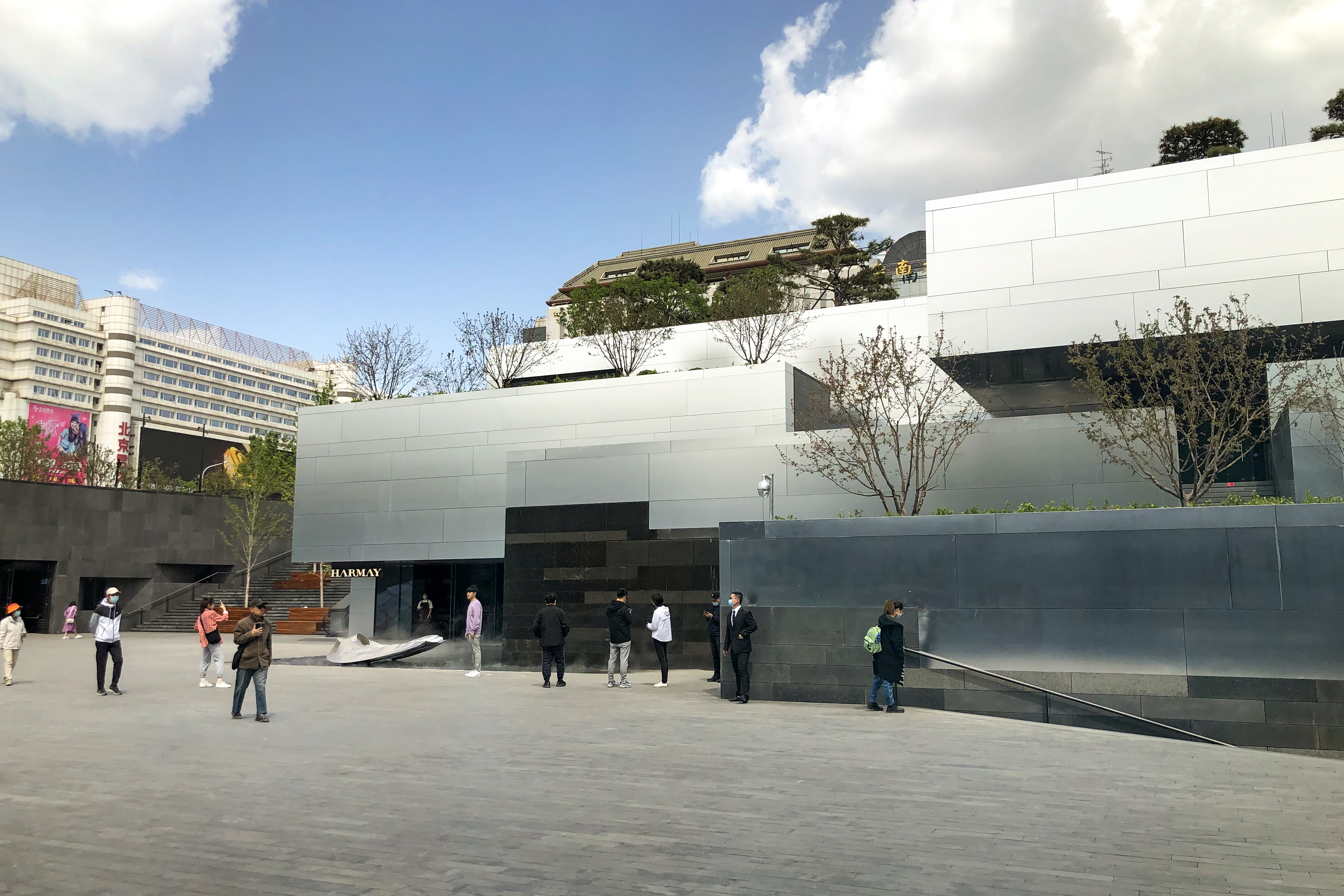
Underground square of The New Xidan

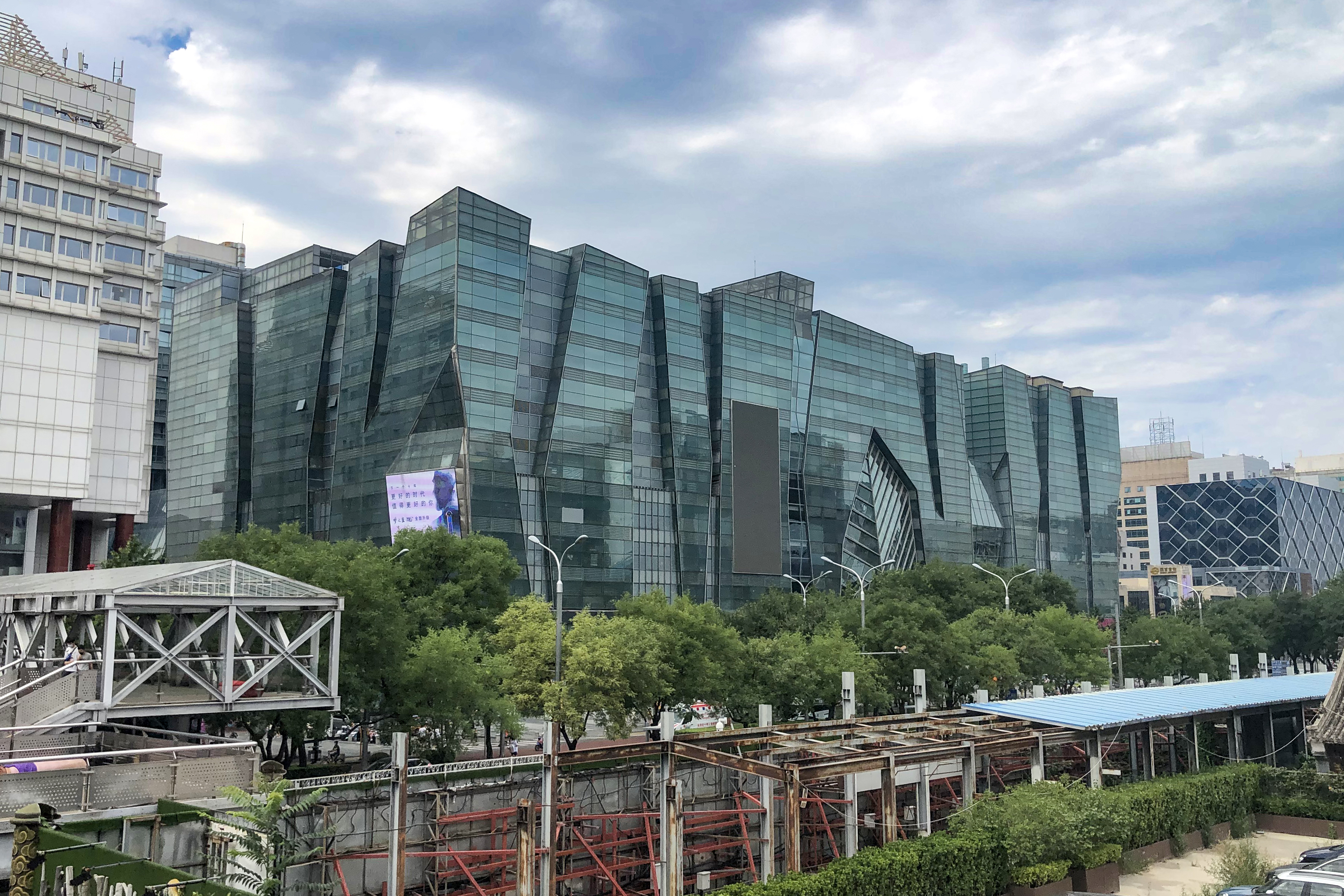
Xidan Joy City

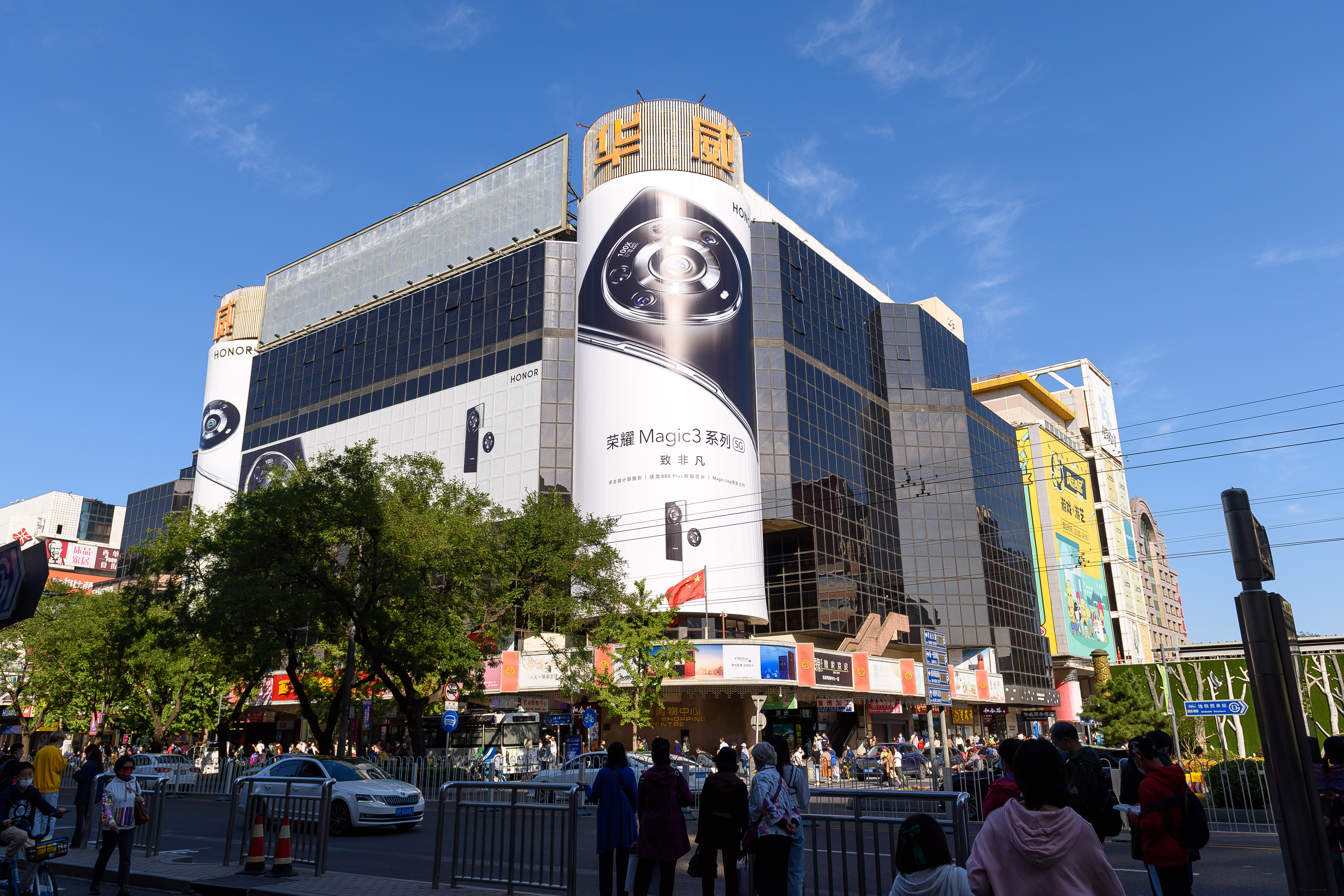
Hua Wei Center

Xidan began to develop in the Ming Dynasty as an area alongside the passage for traders from Southwestern China to enter Beijing. Restaurants and shops were eventually built for these merchants. Eventually, as the Western part of the city became the residential area for officials, Xidan became a commercial area. The location of several government agencies when Beijing was under the administration of the Republic of China also helped Xidan's economic growth.

The area began to experience massive growth in the 1950s, as the population of Beijing began to move westwards. By the 1970s, Xidan, along with Qianmen and Wangfujing, became the three major commercial areas in Beijing.

Currently, the area is known throughout Beijing as a shopping area. Many malls and department stores have stores within the area, the oldest of which is the China branch of the Taiwanese department store Chungyo.

Xidan is also home to Lingjing Alley, which, at 32m (34 yards), is considered to be the broadest hutong in Beijing.

=== Xidan Wall ===
Xidan Wall, also called Democracy Wall, is a long brick wall on Xidan Street. Erected in 1978, the event is generally recognized as the beginning of the Beijing Spring. Xidan Wall played a significant role in the democracy movement in Beijing during the summer of 1979. It was at that time where the wall received a significant number of posters that criticized China's leaders. Even an award-winning Canadian journalist John Fraser put up his own "dazibao," whose notice about a lost gold signet ring that concluded in vague political sentiment bizarrely resulted in his addressing the 1979 summer masses in Tiananmen Square. However, by December 1979, Beijing's municipal government banned the posting of wall posters on Xidan Wall in an attempt to curtail the democracy movement. The municipal government instead allowed allow posters on a site within Yuetan Park, a small park located in Beijing, but required registration with the city and an agreement to be "held responsible for political and legal implications of their messages." Eventually, the most widely regarded poster writer for Xidan Wall, Wei Jingsheng, was sent to prison.

== Transportation ==
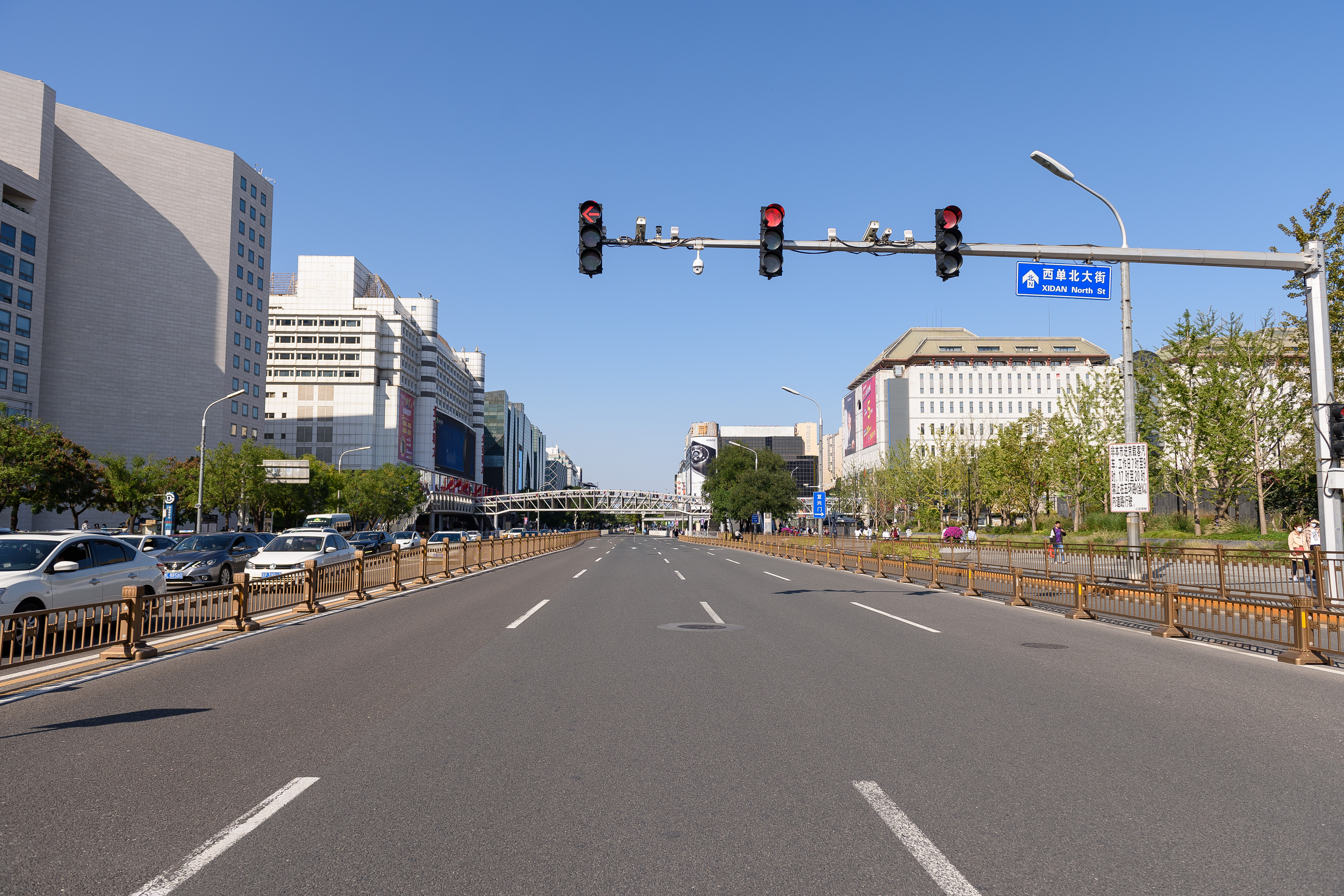
Xidan North Street

The area is served by Xidan station, which is an interchange between Line 1 and Line 4 of the Beijing Subway system. In addition, many Beijing Bus lines serve the area.

== Government and infrastructure ==
The Chinese Ministry of Education is headquartered in Damucang Hutong, Xidan.

== Education ==
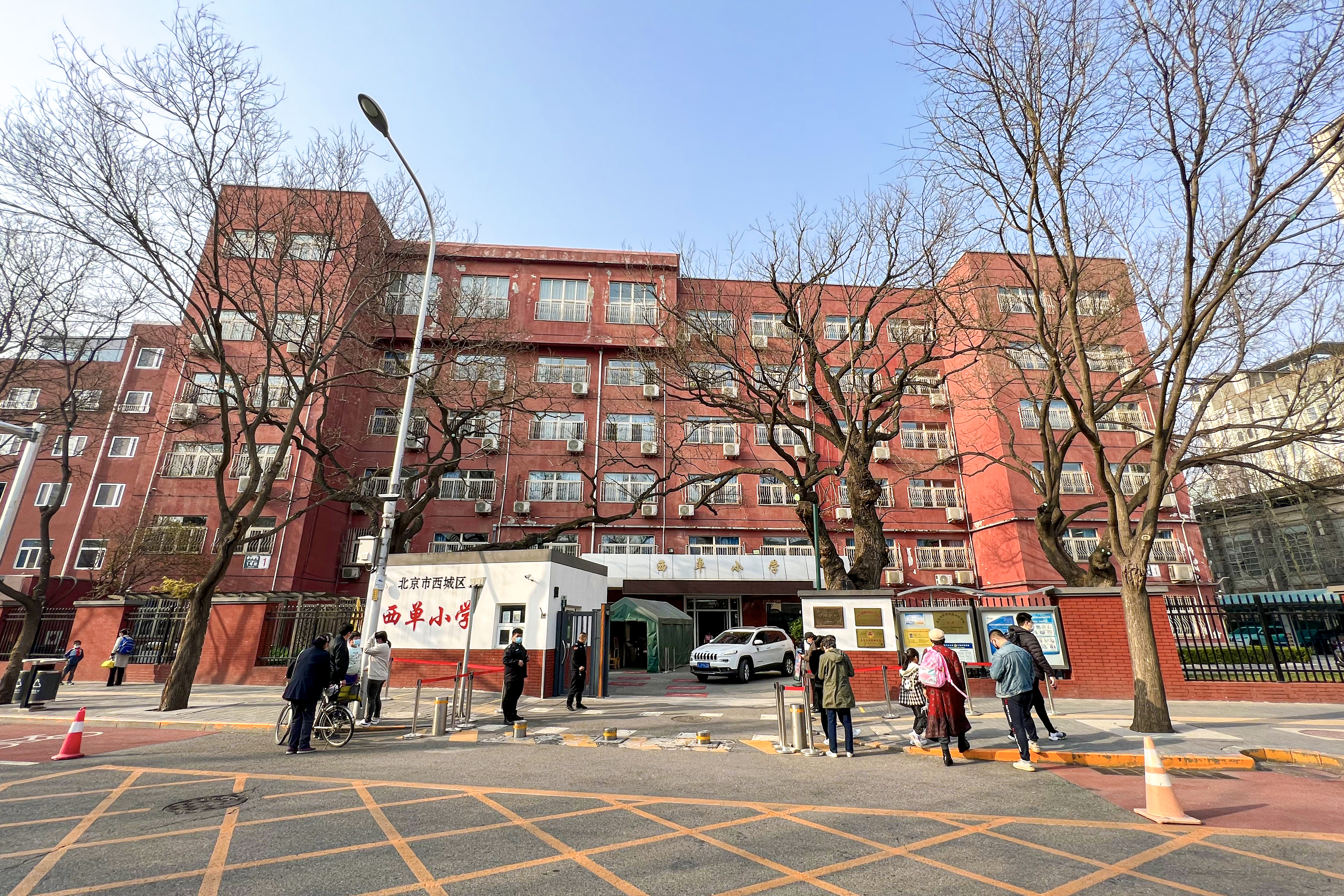
Xidan Primary School

Beijing Xidan Primary School (S: 北京市西单小学, P: Běijīng Shì Xīdān Xiǎoxué) serves Xidan. The school's predecessor was a private school, Jiemin Primary School (洁民小学), established in 1934. The Ministry of Education took control in 1953. In 1958 Jiemin merged with Xidan Toutiao Primary School (西单头条小学) and Baimiao Primary School (白庙小学). The school received its current name in August 2002.

== Future ==
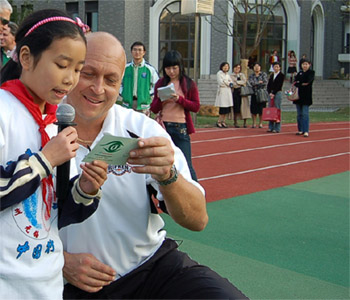
Xidan Elementary School student reading a letter she wrote to American Public Diplomacy Envoy Cal Ripken Jr. during his October 28, 2007 to November 6, 2007 visit to China.

The Chinese Government has targeted Xidan in its 11th Five Year Plan, which is scheduled to conclude by 2010, with a stated mission of improving the area's environment, as well as diversifying the genre of stores that open in the area. Portions of the plan were already completed in the run up to the 2008 Olympic Games.
