= Lingjing Hutong station =

Beijing Subway station

Coordinates: 39.9161°N 116.3737°E

Lingjing Hutong 灵境胡同
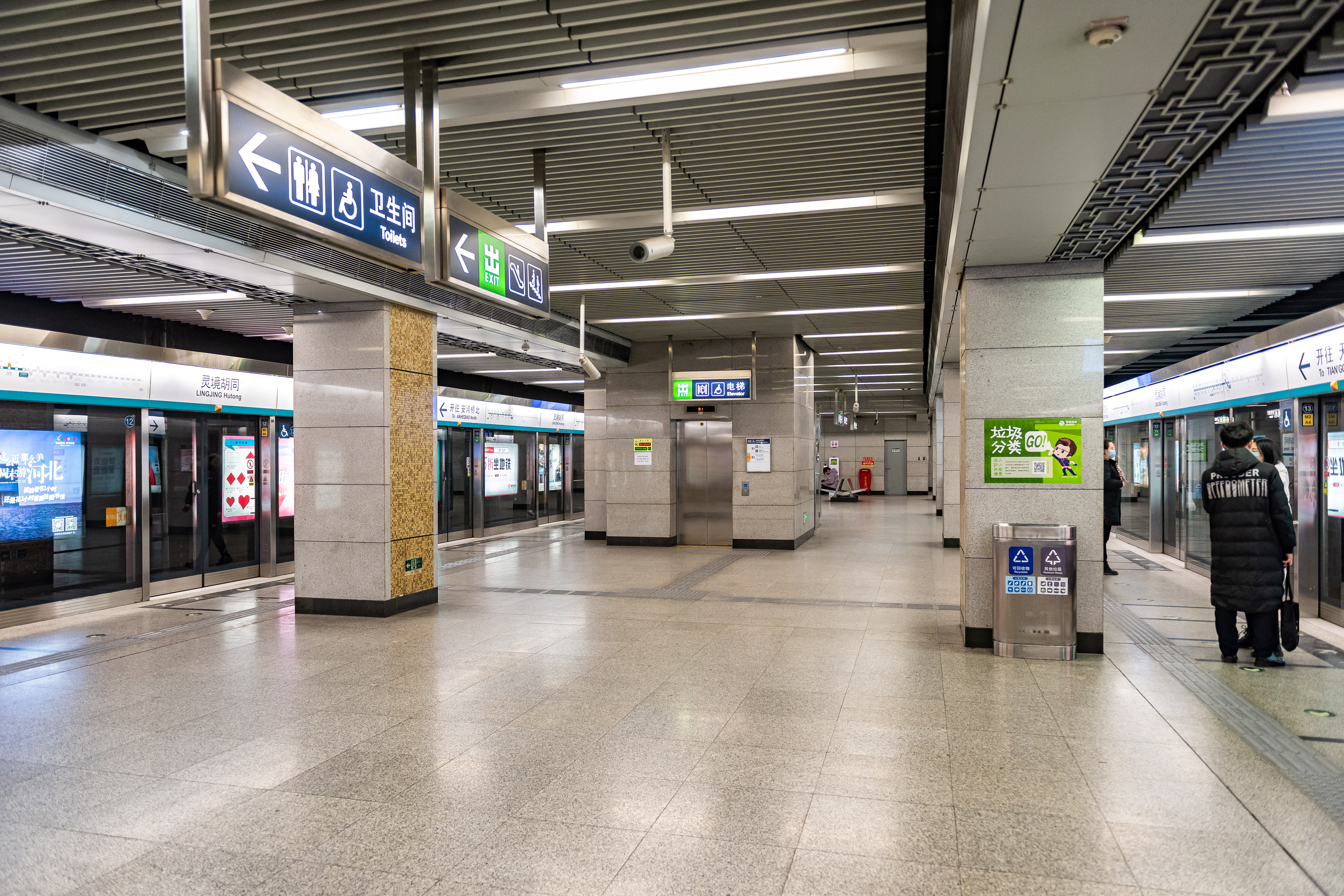
- Platform

General information
- Location: Xidan North Street; Xicheng District, Beijing; China
- Operator: Beijing MTR Corporation Limited
- Line: Line 4
- Platforms: 2 (1 island platform)
- Tracks: 2

Construction
- Structure type: Underground
- Accessible: Yes

History
- Opened: September 28, 2009

Services
Preceding station	Beijing Subway	Following station
Xisi towards Anheqiaobei	Line 4	Xidan towards Tiangong Yuan
Location
- Location within Beijing

Lingjing Hutong station (simplified Chinese: 灵境胡同站; traditional Chinese: 靈境胡同站; pinyin: Língjìng Hútòng zhàn) is a station on Line 4 of the Beijing Subway, located on Xidan North St., about 150 m (490 ft) north of the west entrance of Lingjing hutong, after which it is named.

== Station layout ==
The station has an underground island platform.

== Exits ==
There are 3 exits, lettered B, C, and D. Exit C is accessible.

== Gallery ==
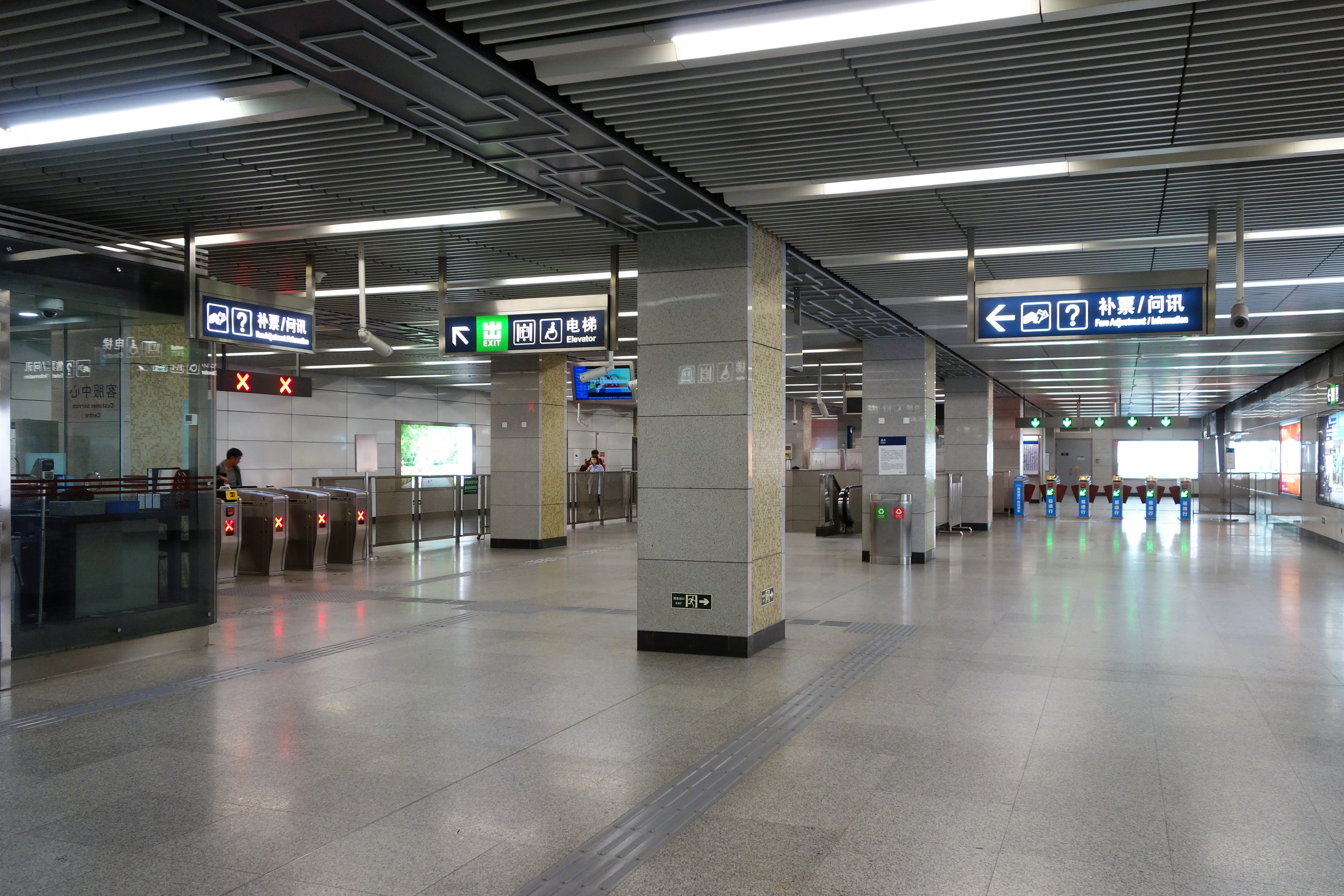
Concourse
