= Lingjing hutong =

Street in Beijing, China

Coordinates: 39.9161°N 116.3737°E

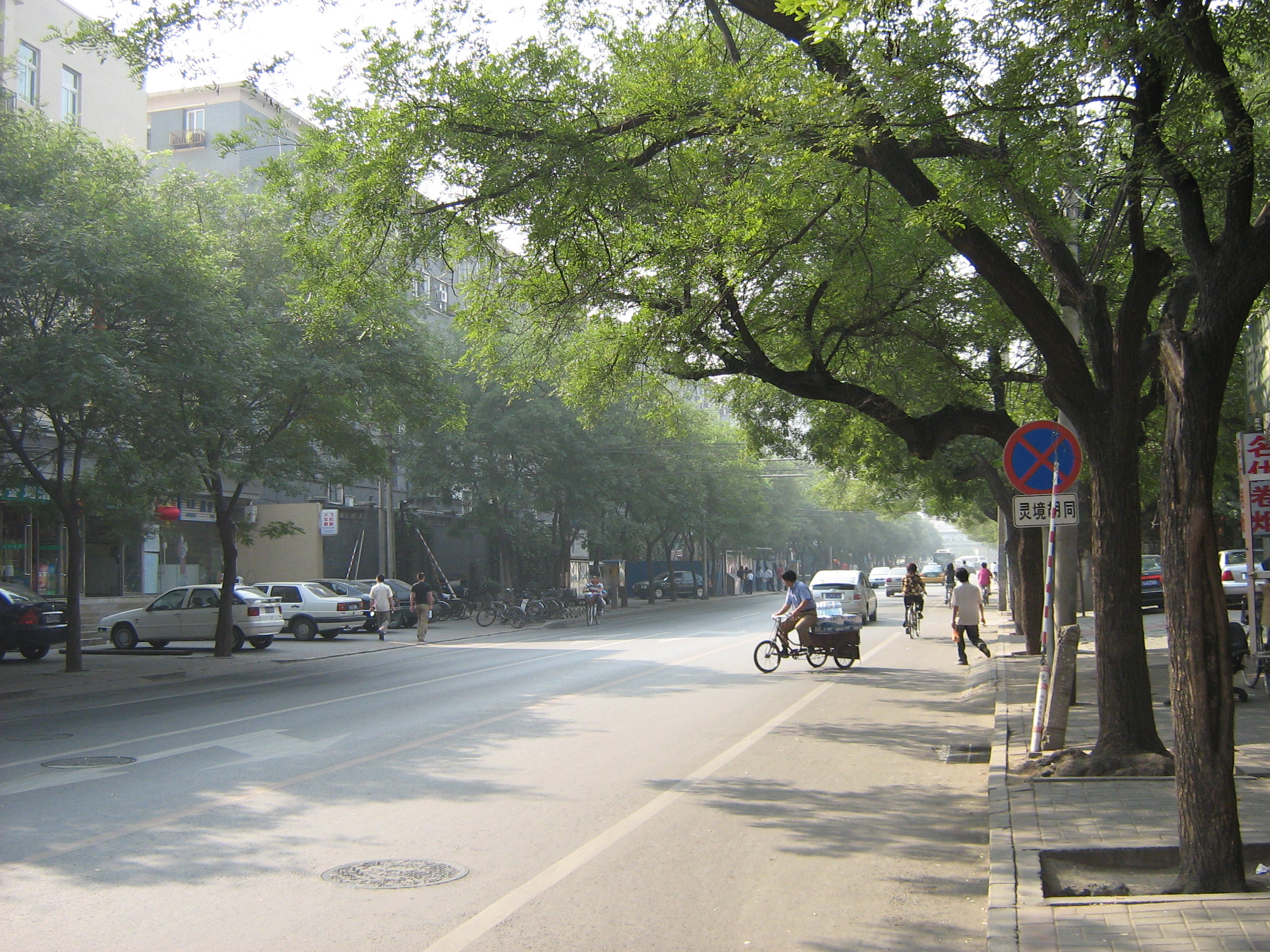
West entrance of the Lingjing hutong

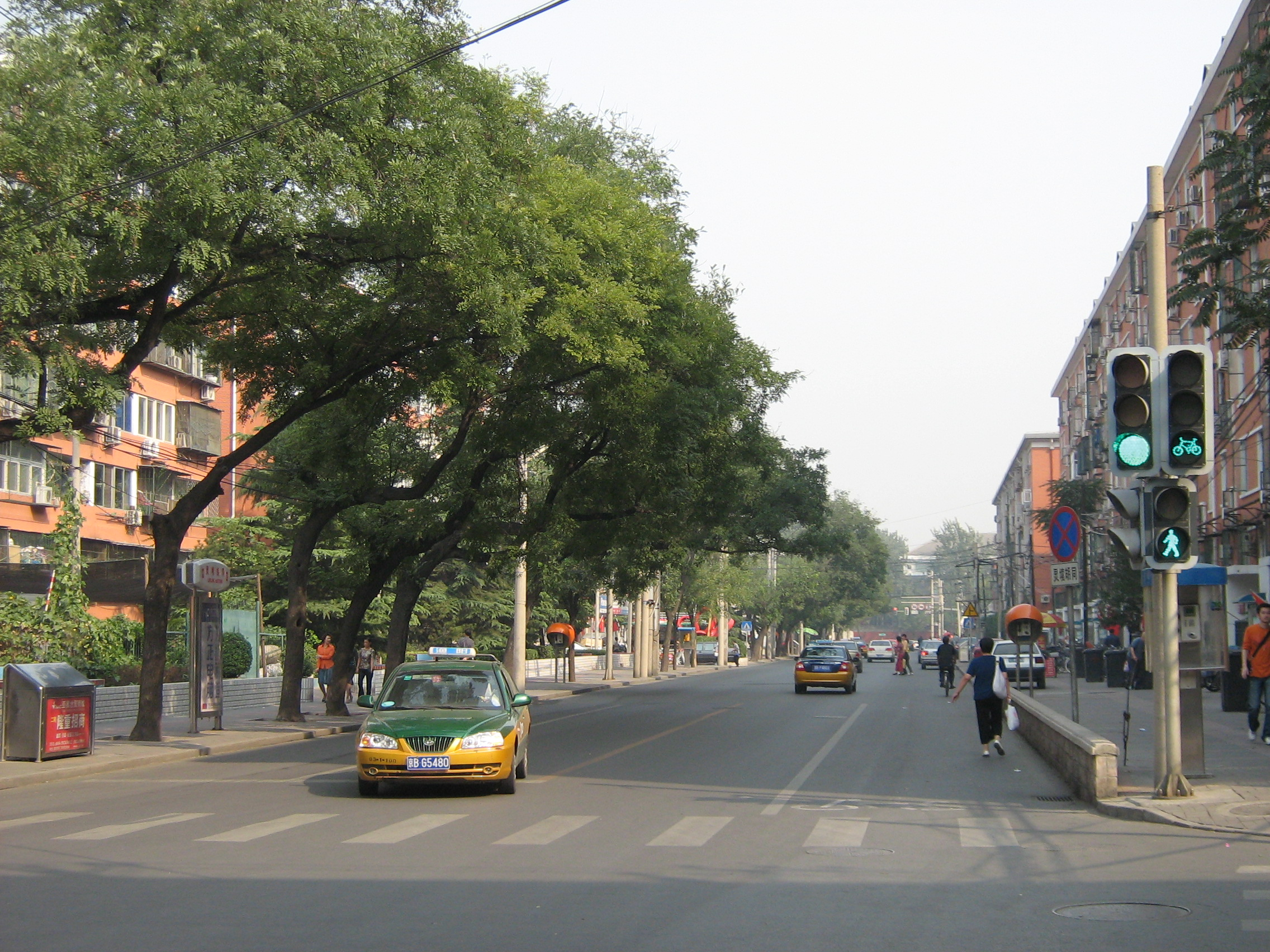
East entrance of the Lingjing hutong

Lingjing hutong (Chinese: 灵境胡同; pinyin: Língjìng hútong) is a hutong in Beijing, located near to Xidan, in the Xicheng District, Beijing. It is approximately 600 metres (2,000 ft) long, running from Xidan North Street to Fuyou Street with a width of 32 metres (105 ft), it is considered the broadest hutong in Beijing.

== History ==
In the Ming Dynasty it was divided into the eastern and western sections, each with very distinct characters. The eastern section was home to the Lingji Palace. It went through many changes in the Qing Dynasty. In 1911, after the Republic of China was established, the eastern section was renamed to Huang Cheng Gen, and the western section is what is now known as the Lingjing hutong. In 1985, the municipal government decided to replace many of the houses with six-story residential buildings. In 1988 there were a total of 13 residential buildings. Around 1992, it was widened. Nowadays, it is 32.18 m wide at the broadest point. In 2009, the Lingjing Hutong station of Beijing Subway opened. The station is located outside of the hutong, on Xidan North Street, about 150 metres north of the west entrance of the hutong.
