= Xisi station =

Beijing Subway station

Coordinates: 39.9249°N 116.3737°E

Xisi 西四
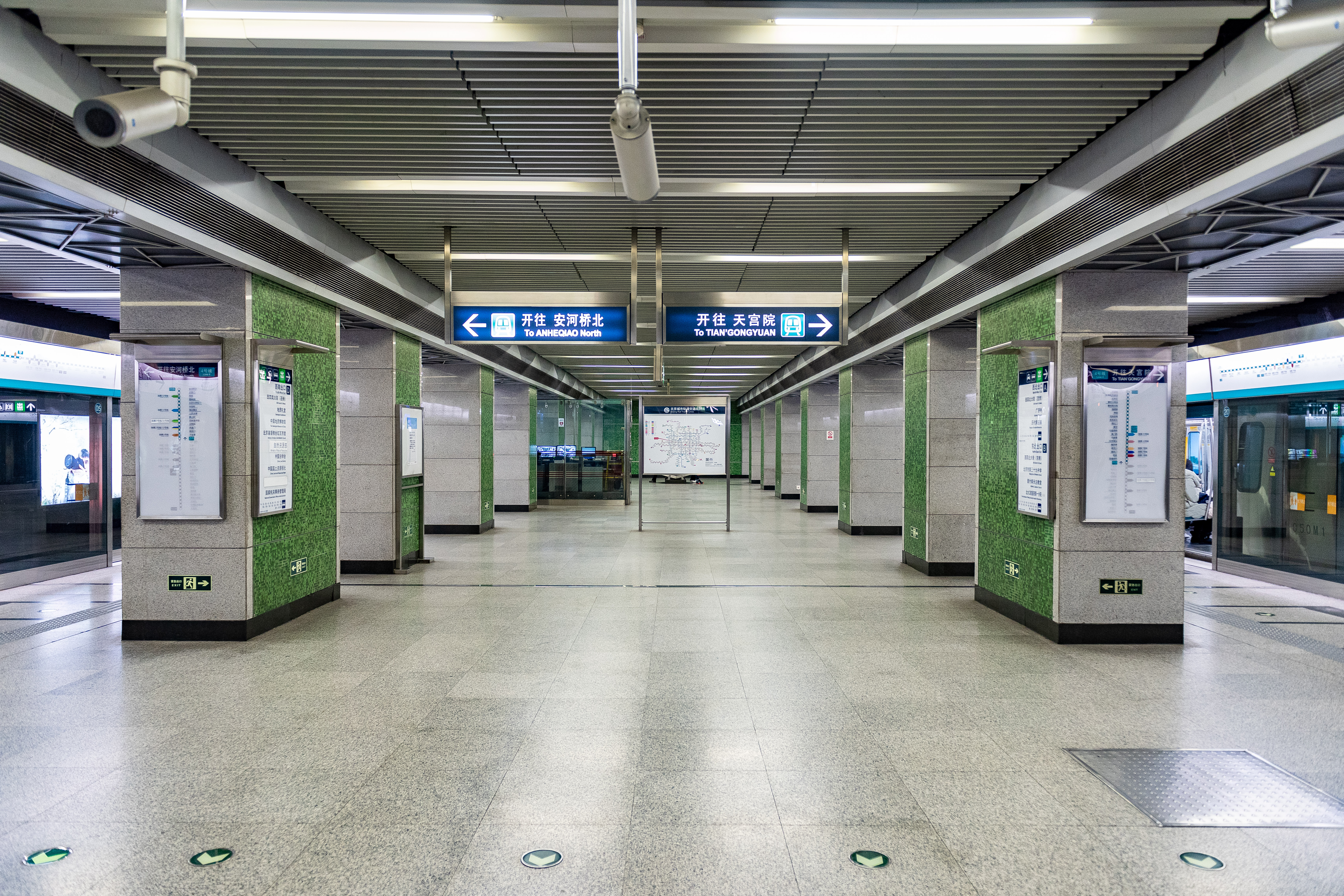
- Platform

General information
- Location: Xisi, Xicheng District, Beijing; China
- Operator: Beijing MTR Corporation Limited
- Line: Line 4
- Platforms: 2 (1 island platform)
- Tracks: 2

Construction
- Structure type: Underground
- Accessible: Yes

History
- Opened: September 28, 2009

Services
Preceding station	Beijing Subway	Following station
Ping'anli towards Anheqiaobei	Line 4	Lingjing Hutong towards Tiangong Yuan
Location
- Location within Beijing

Xisi station (Chinese: 西四站; pinyin: Xīsì zhàn) is a station on Line 4 of the Beijing Subway. The station is located in Xisi, Xicheng District, Beijing.

== Station layout ==
The station has an underground island platform.

== Exits ==
There are 4 exits, lettered A1, A2, B, and D. Exit D is accessible.
