= Jiukeshu station =

Beijing Subway station

Jiukeshu 九棵树
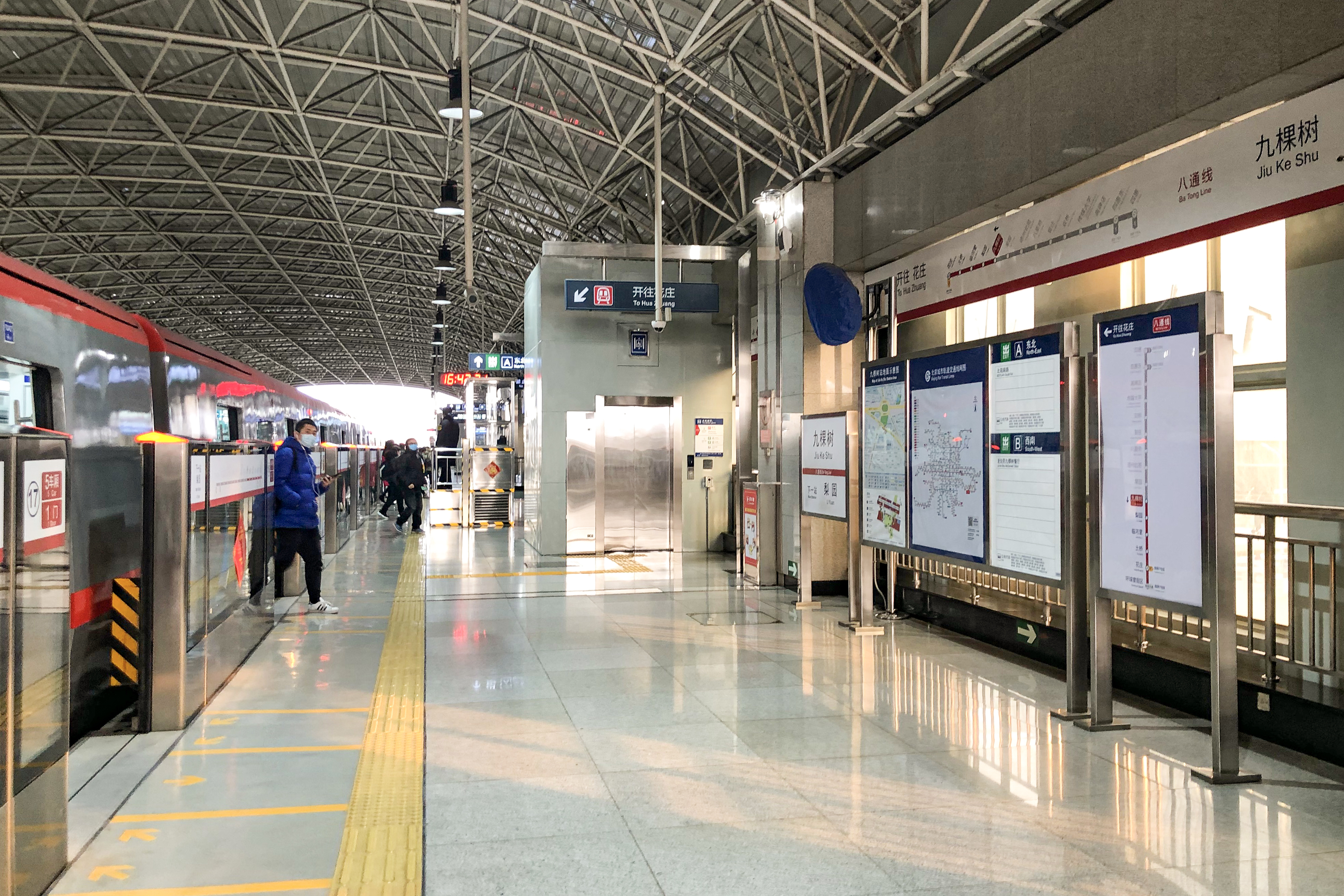
- Platform

General information
- Location: South Beiyuan Road (北苑南路) and West Jiukeshu Road (九棵树西路); Tongzhou District, Beijing; China
- Coordinates: 39.890278°N 116.657533°E
- Operator: Beijing Mass Transit Railway Operation Corporation Limited
- Line: Batong line
- Platforms: 2 (2 side platforms)
- Tracks: 2

Construction
- Structure type: Elevated
- Accessible: Yes

Other information
- Station code: BT10

History
- Opened: December 27, 2003

Services
Preceding station	Beijing Subway	Following station
Guoyuan towards Gucheng	Batong line	Liyuan towards Universal Resort
Location
- Location within Beijing

Jiukeshu Station (simplified Chinese: 九棵树站; traditional Chinese: 九棵樹站; pinyin: Jiǔkēshù Zhàn; lit. 'nine trees') is a station on the Batong line of the Beijing Subway.

== Station layout ==
The station has 2 elevated side platforms.

== Exits ==
There are 2 exits, lettered A and B. Exit B is accessible.
