= Linheli station =

Beijing Subway station

Linheli 临河里
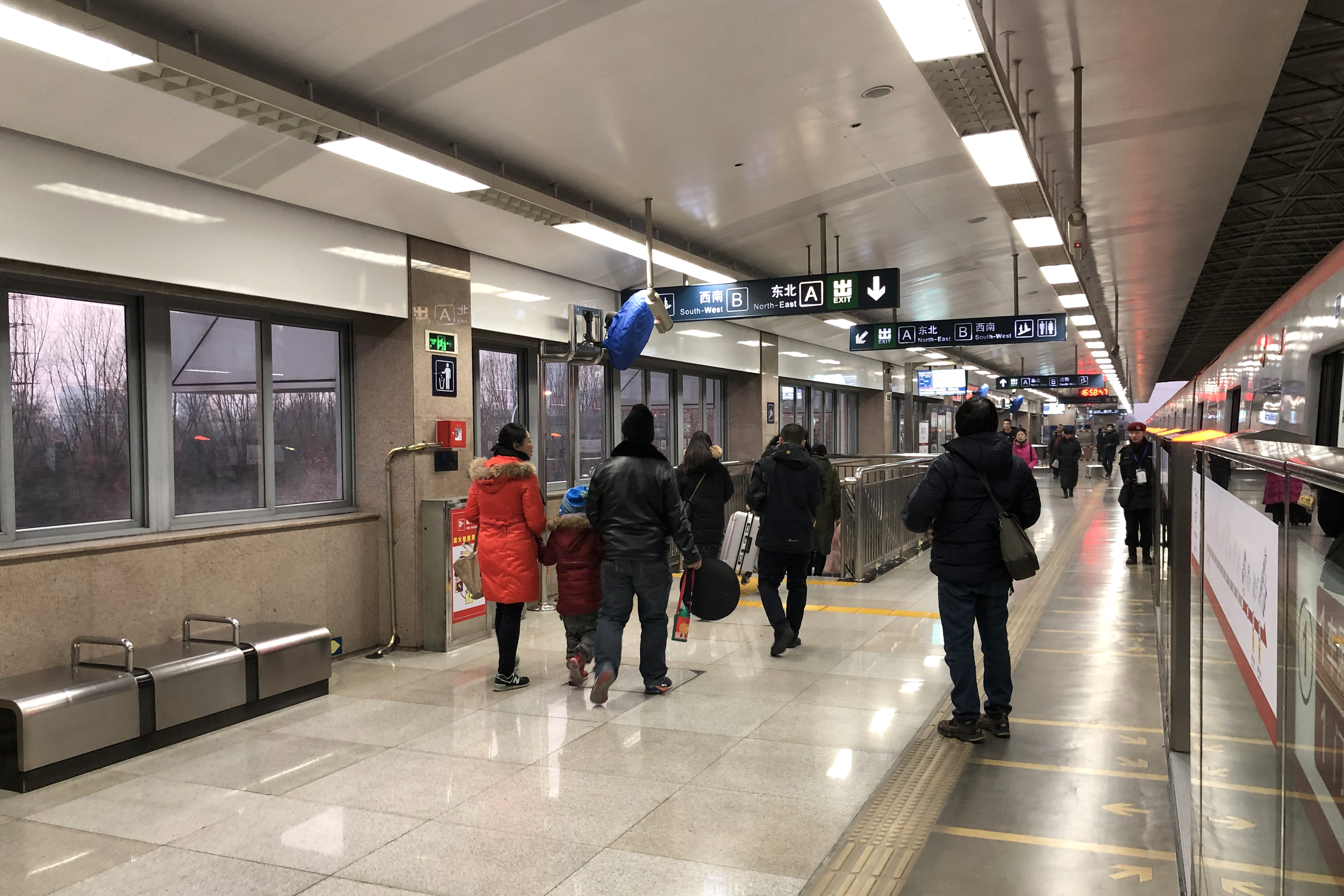
- Platform in December 2019

General information
- Location: East Jiukeshu Road (九棵树东路); Tongzhou District, Beijing; China
- Coordinates: 39.8754°N 116.6787°E
- Operator: Beijing Mass Transit Railway Operation Corporation Limited
- Line: Batong line
- Platforms: 2 (2 side platforms)
- Tracks: 2

Construction
- Structure type: Elevated
- Accessible: Yes

Other information
- Station code: BT12

History
- Opened: December 27, 2003; 22 years ago

Services
Preceding station	Beijing Subway	Following station
Liyuan towards Gucheng	Batong line	Tu Qiao towards Universal Resort
Location
- Location within Beijing

Linheli (simplified Chinese: 临河里站; traditional Chinese: 臨河里站; pinyin: Línhélǐ Zhàn) is a station on the Batong line of the Beijing Subway.

== Station layout ==
The station has 2 elevated side platforms.

== Exits ==
The station has 2 exits, lettered A and B. Exit B is accessible.
