= Changying =

Changying (Chinese: 常营; pinyin: chángyíng) is the name of several places in the People's Republic of China:

- Changying, Beijing, a township in Chaoyang District
- Changying Station, a station on Line 6 of the Beijing Subway
- Changying, Henan, a township in Taikang county
