= Dalianpo station =

Beijing Subway station

Dalianpo 褡裢坡
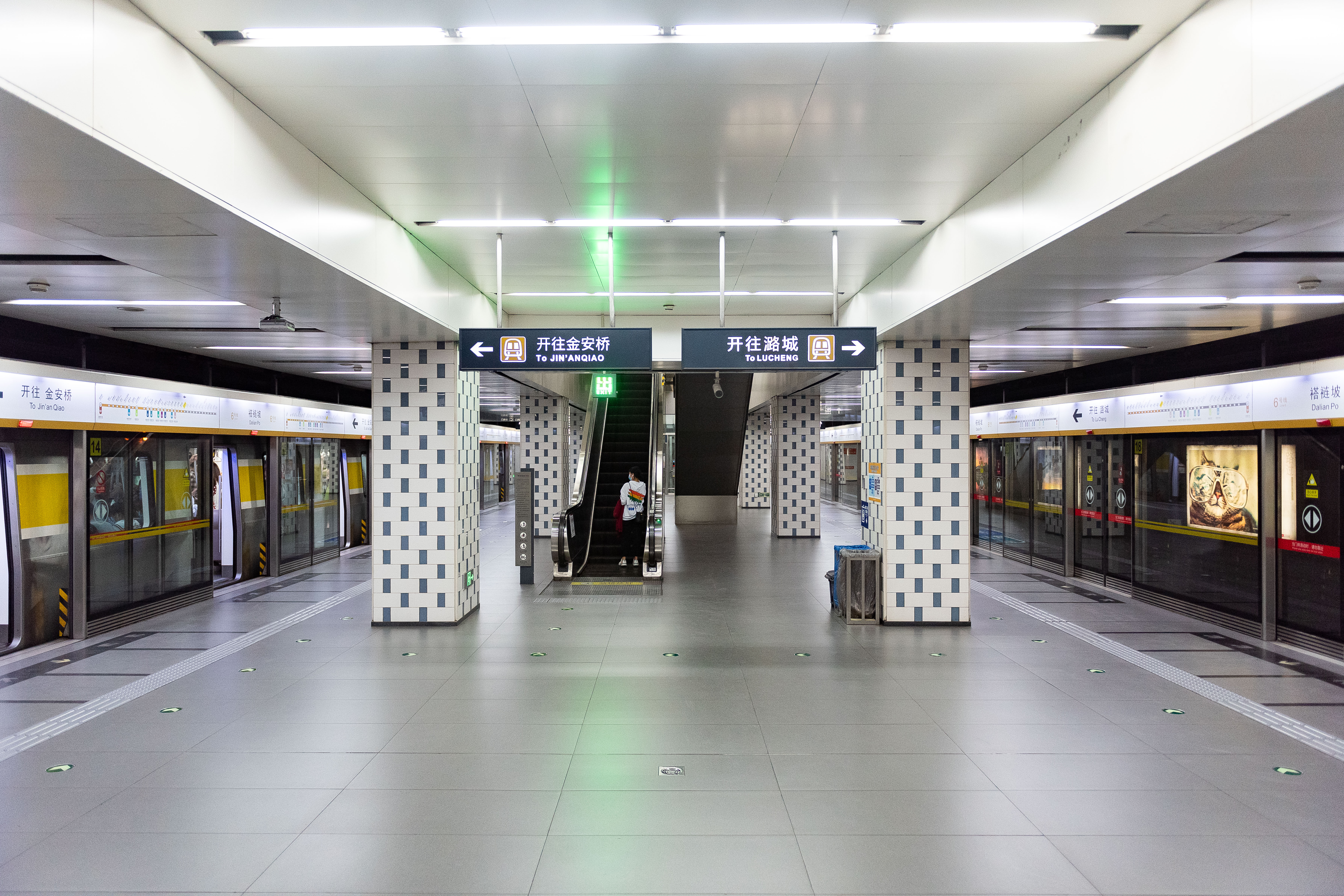
- Platform in June 2021

General information
- Location: Dingfuzhuang Road (定福庄路) and North Chaoyang Road (朝阳北路); Chaoyang District, Beijing; China
- Coordinates: 39.9240°N 116.5640°E
- Operator: Beijing Mass Transit Railway Operation Corporation Limited
- Line: Line 6
- Platforms: 2 (1 island platform)
- Tracks: 2

Construction
- Structure type: Underground
- Accessible: Yes

History
- Opened: December 30, 2012; 13 years ago

Services
Preceding station	Beijing Subway	Following station
Qingnian Lu towards Jin'anqiao	Line 6	Huangqu towards Luyang
Location
- Location within Beijing

Dalianpo (simplified Chinese: 褡裢坡站; traditional Chinese: 褡褳坡站; pinyin: Dālianpō Zhàn) is a station on Line 6 of the Beijing Subway. This station opened on December 30, 2012.

== Station layout ==
The station has an underground island platform.

== Exits ==
There are three exits, lettered B, C, and D. Exits B and D are accessible.
