= Caofang station =

Beijing Subway station

Caofang 草房
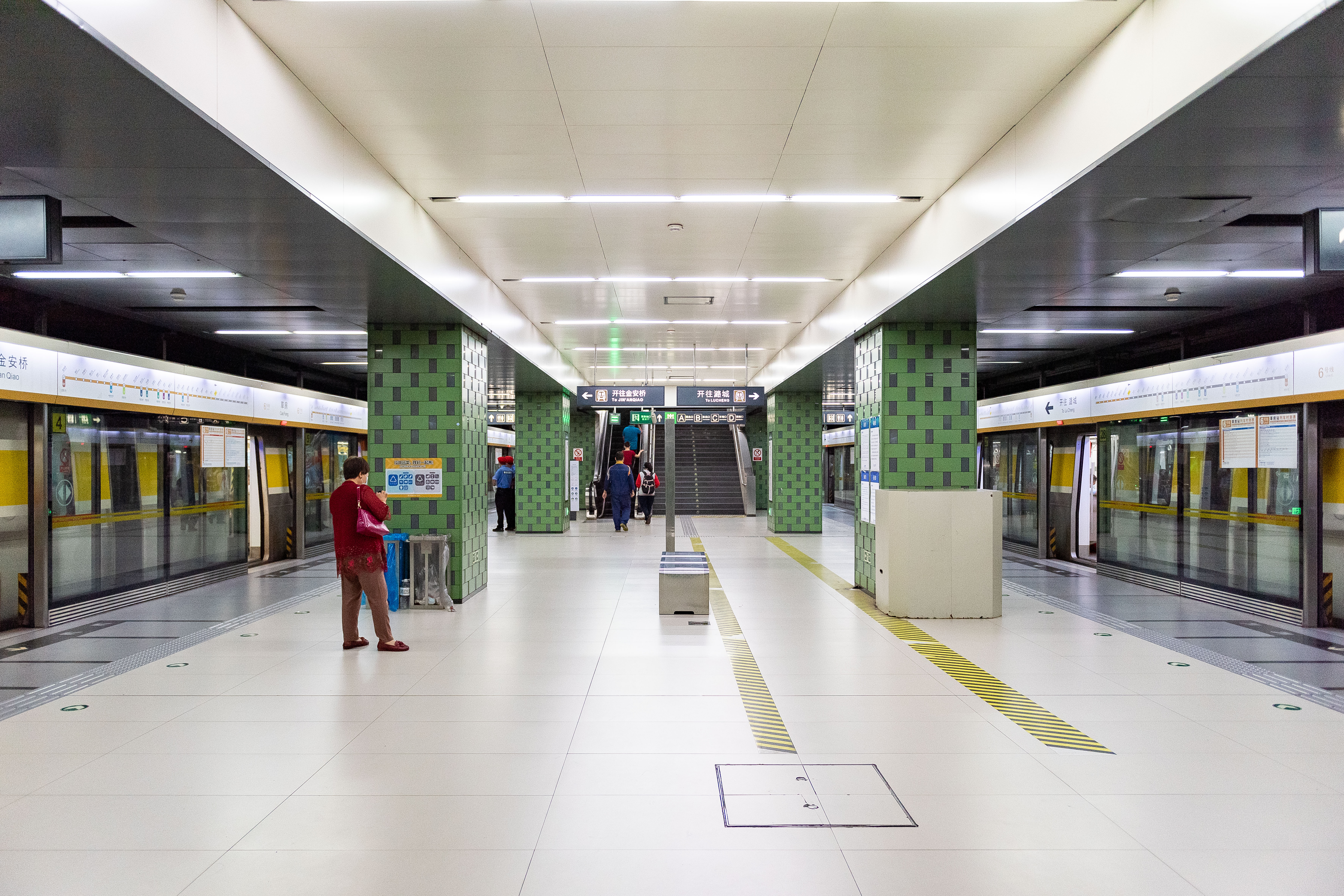
- Platform

General information
- Location: West Caofang Road (草房西路) and North Chaoyang Road (朝阳北路); Chaoyang District, Beijing; China
- Coordinates: 39.924781°N 116.616067°E
- Operator: Beijing Mass Transit Railway Operation Corporation Limited
- Line: Line 6
- Platforms: 2 (1 island platform)
- Tracks: 2

Construction
- Structure type: Underground
- Accessible: Yes

History
- Opened: December 30, 2012; 13 years ago

Services
Preceding station	Beijing Subway	Following station
Changying towards Jin'anqiao	Line 6	Wuzi Xueyuan Lu towards Luyang
Location
- Location within Beijing

Caofang (Chinese: 草房站; pinyin: Cǎofáng Zhàn) is a station on Line 6 of the Beijing Subway. This station opened on December 30, 2012. It was the eastern terminus of Line 6 until the Section II opened on December 28, 2014.

== Station layout ==
The station has an underground island platform.

== Exits ==
There are 4 exits, lettered A, B, C, and D. Exit D is accessible.

== Gallery ==
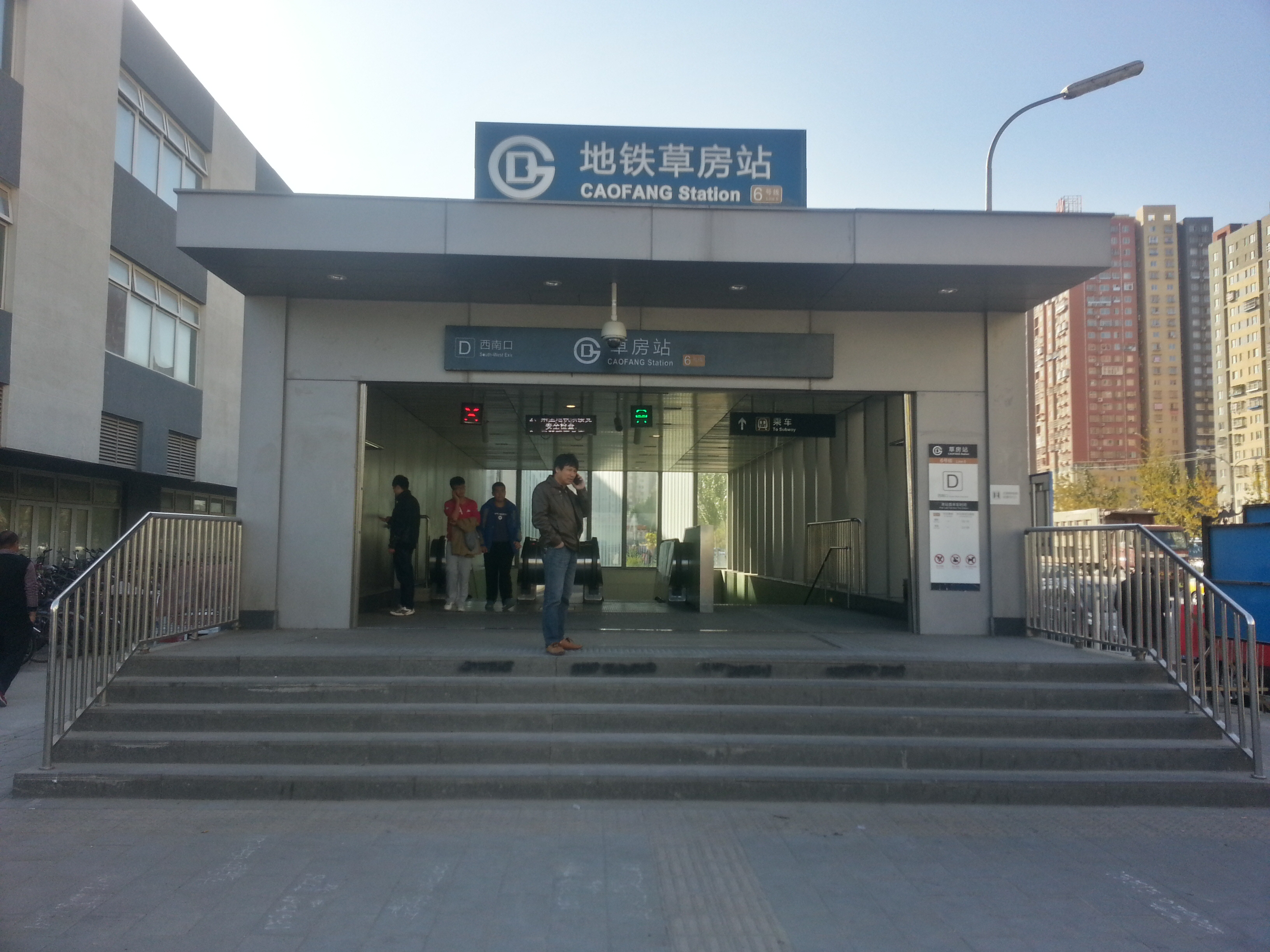
Exit D

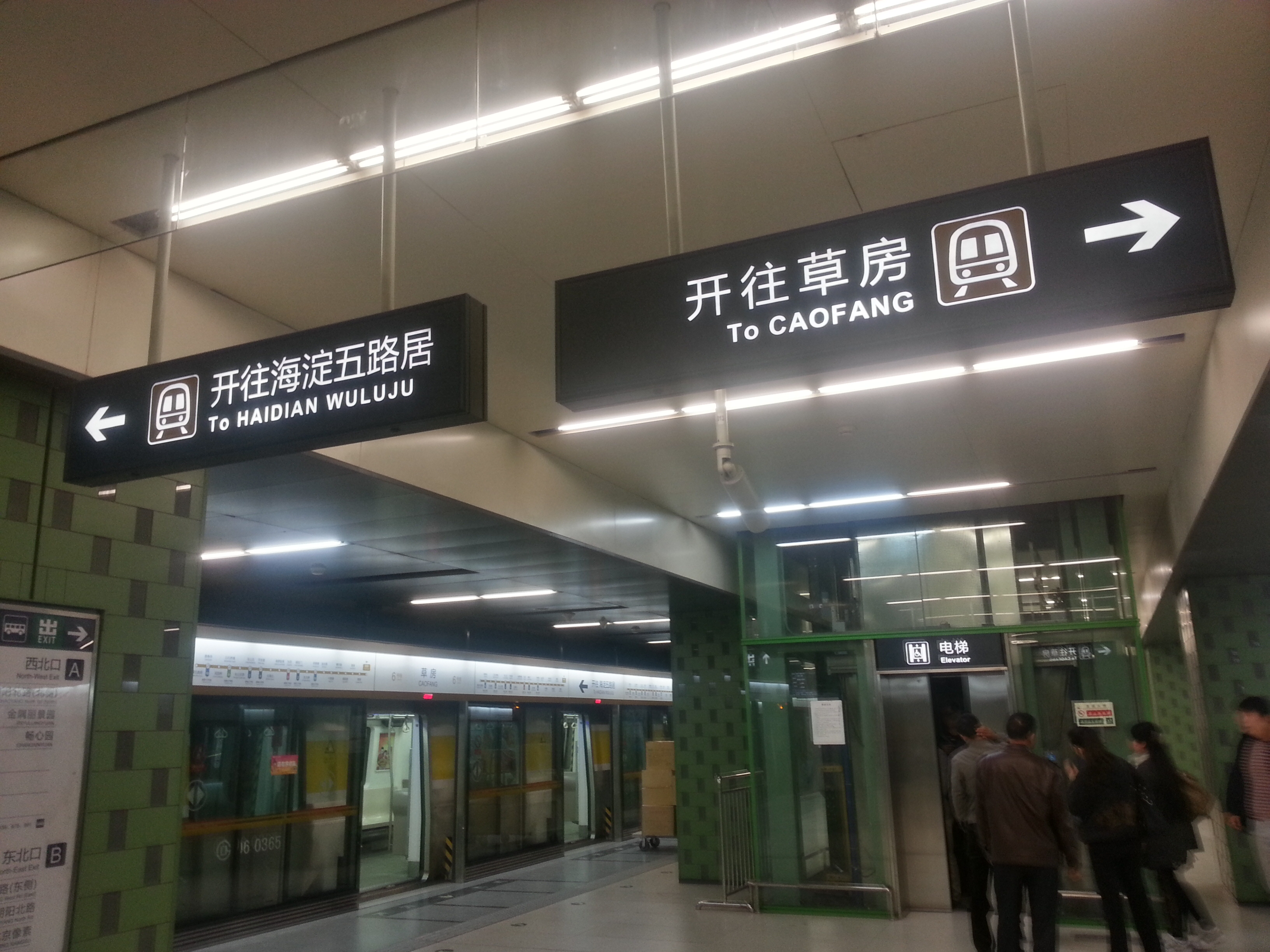
Route direction signs

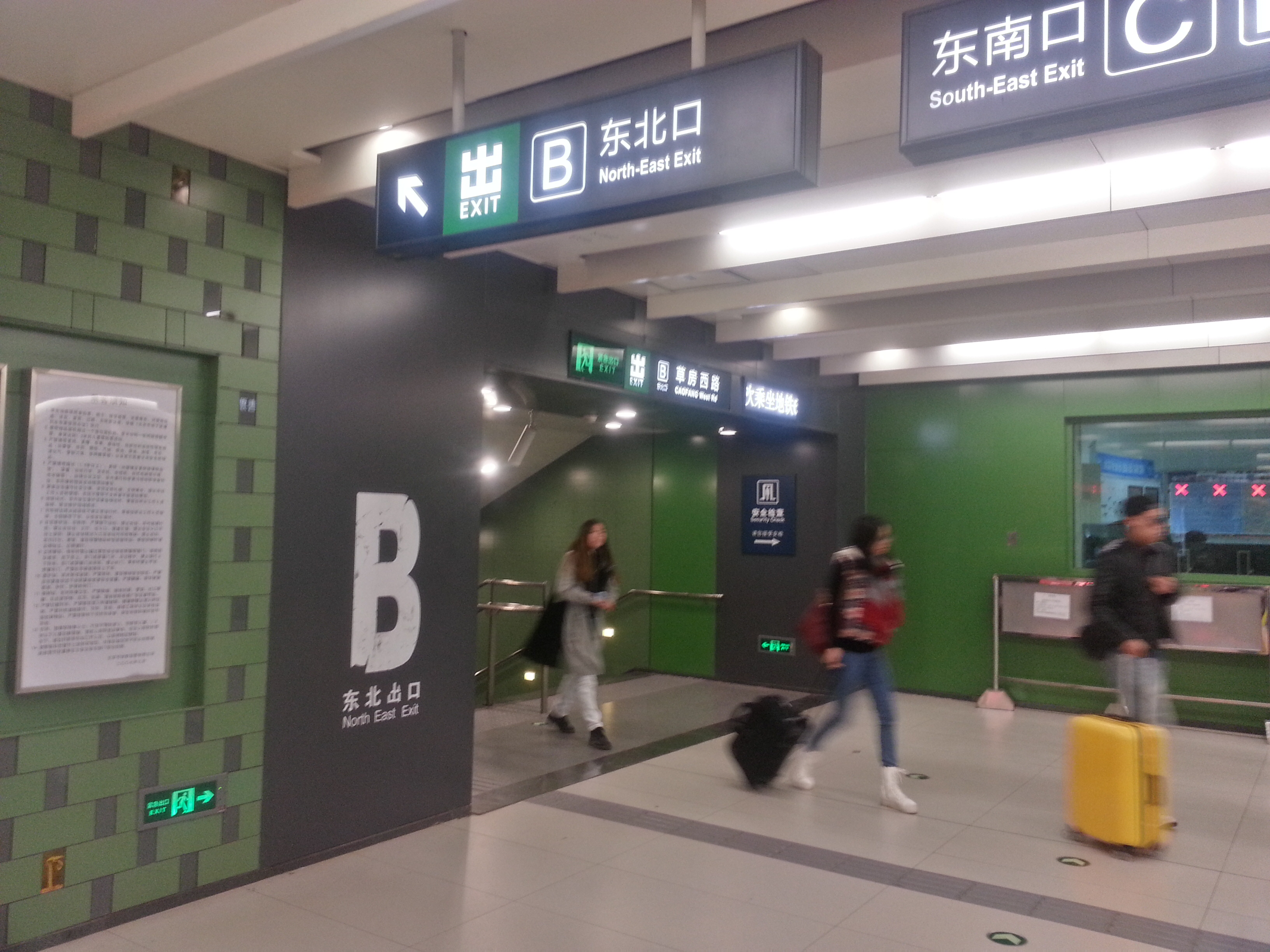
Passage towards Exit B

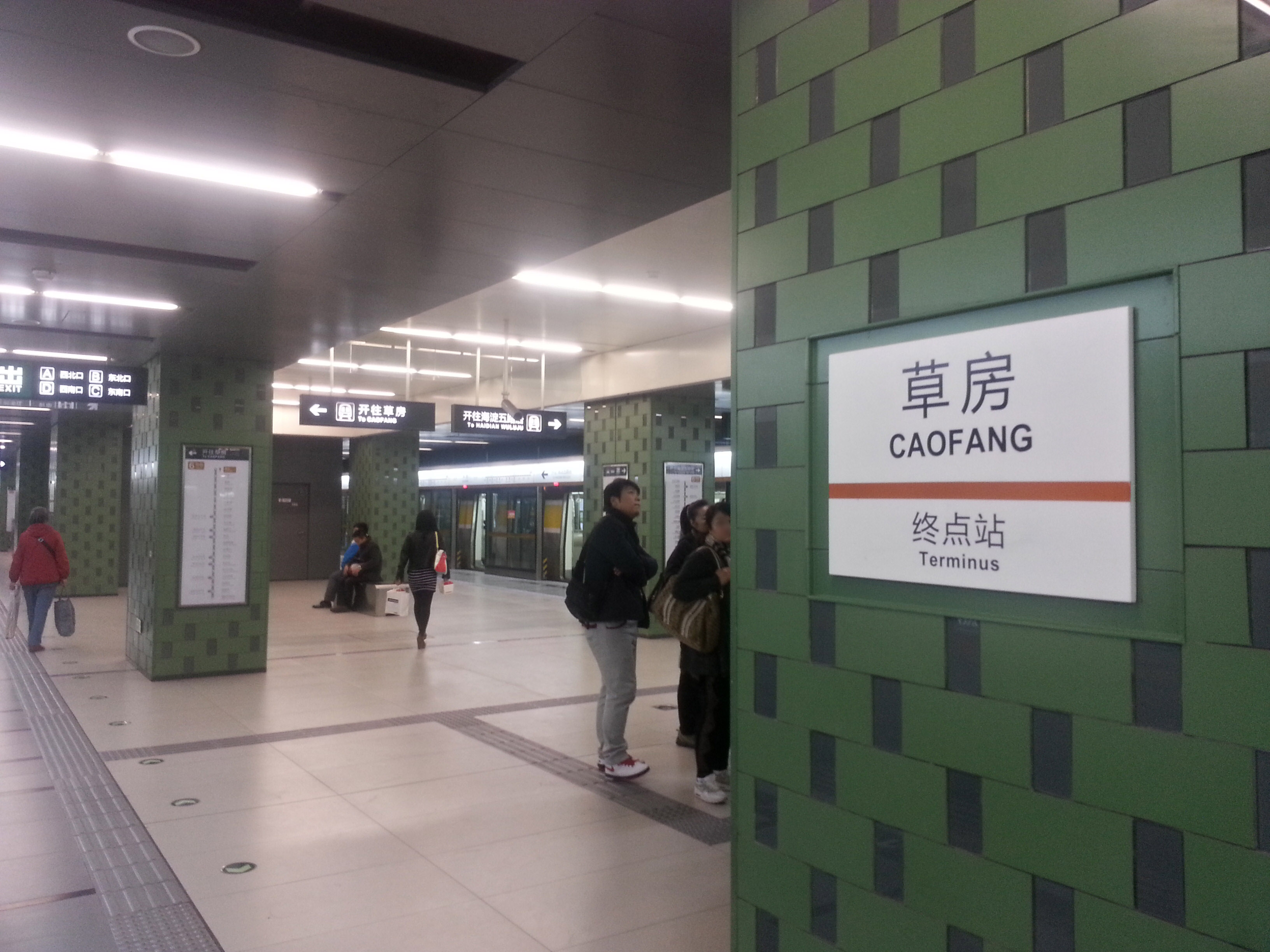
Pillar in the Station platform.

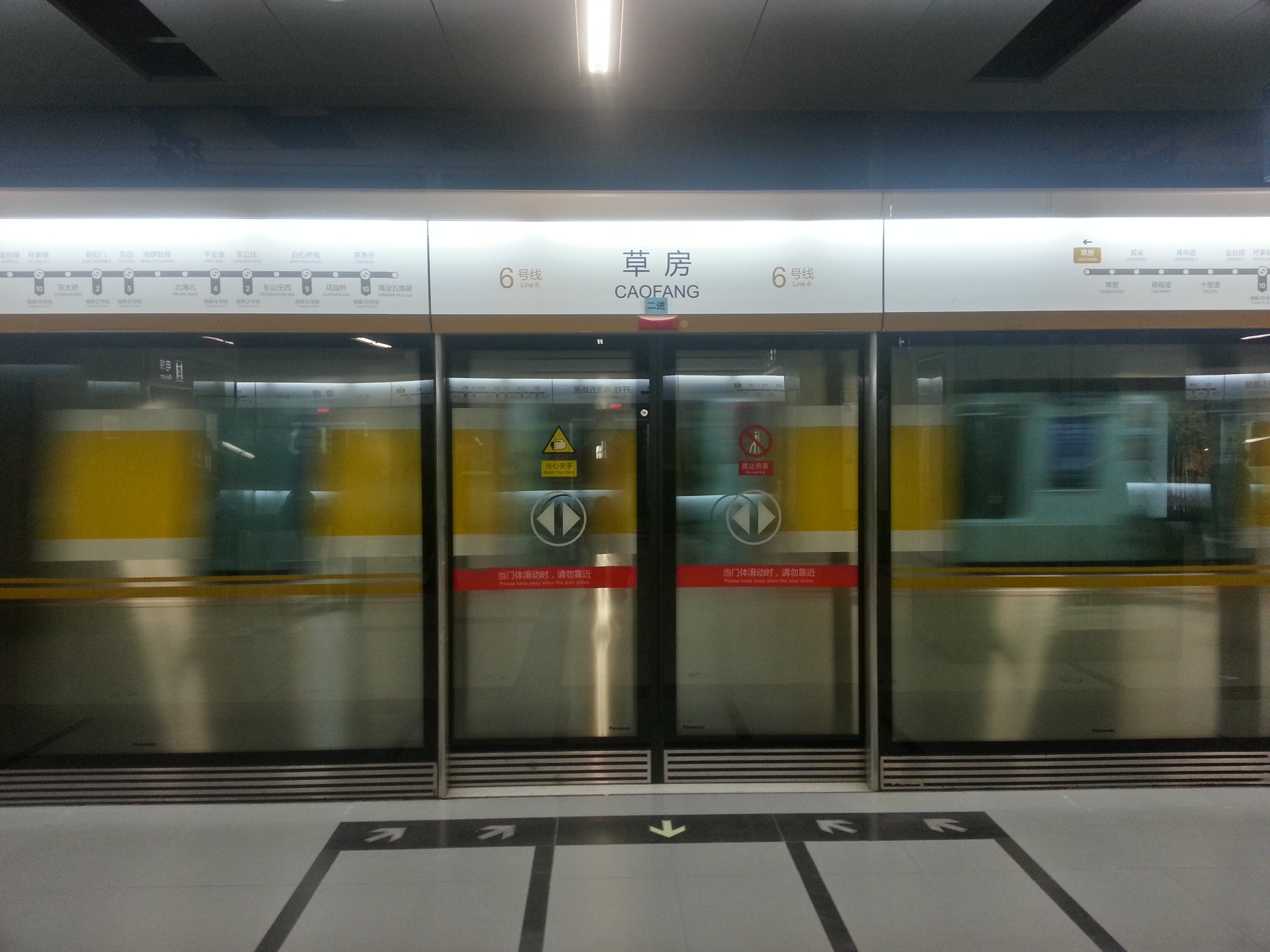
Platform screen doors

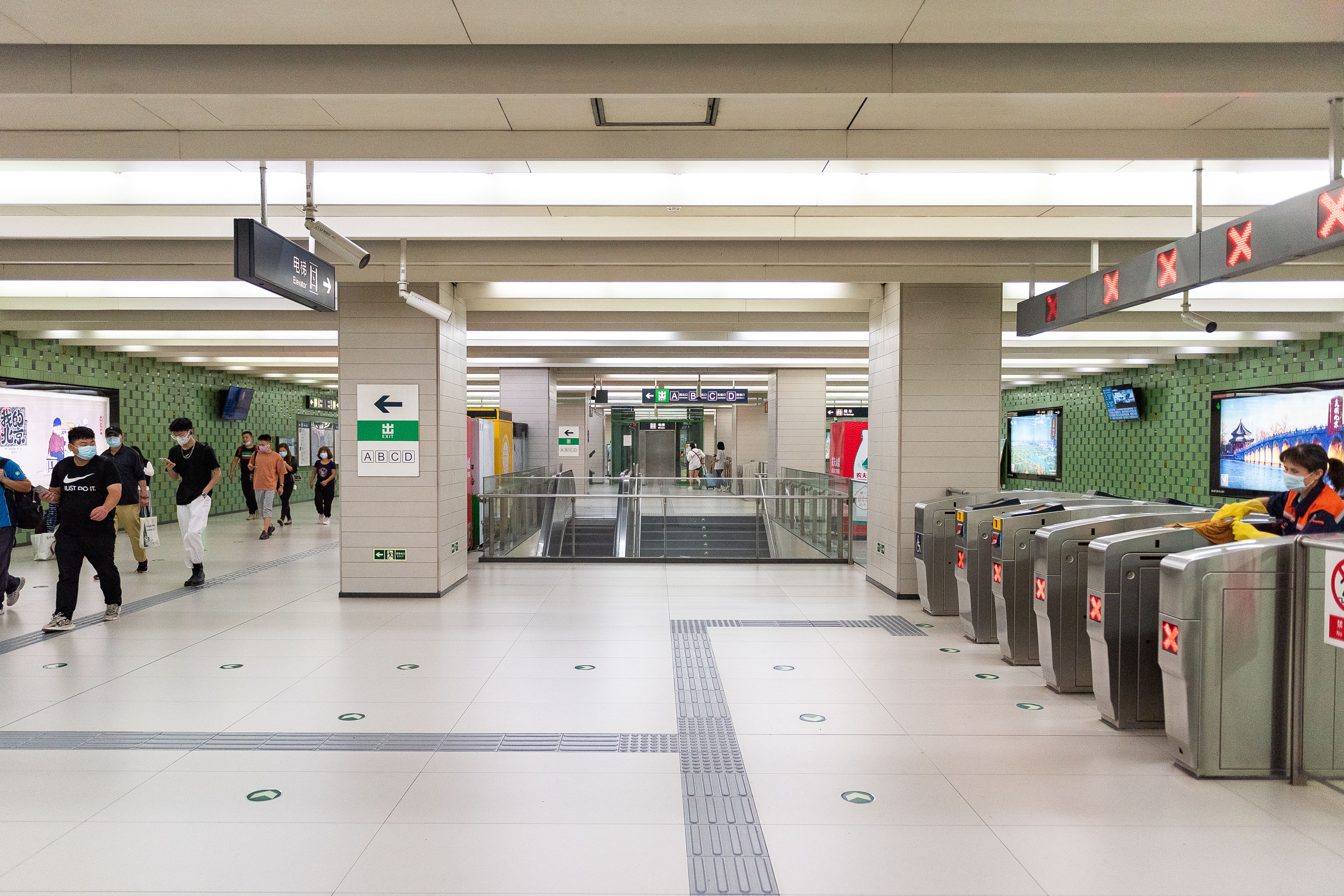
Station concourse

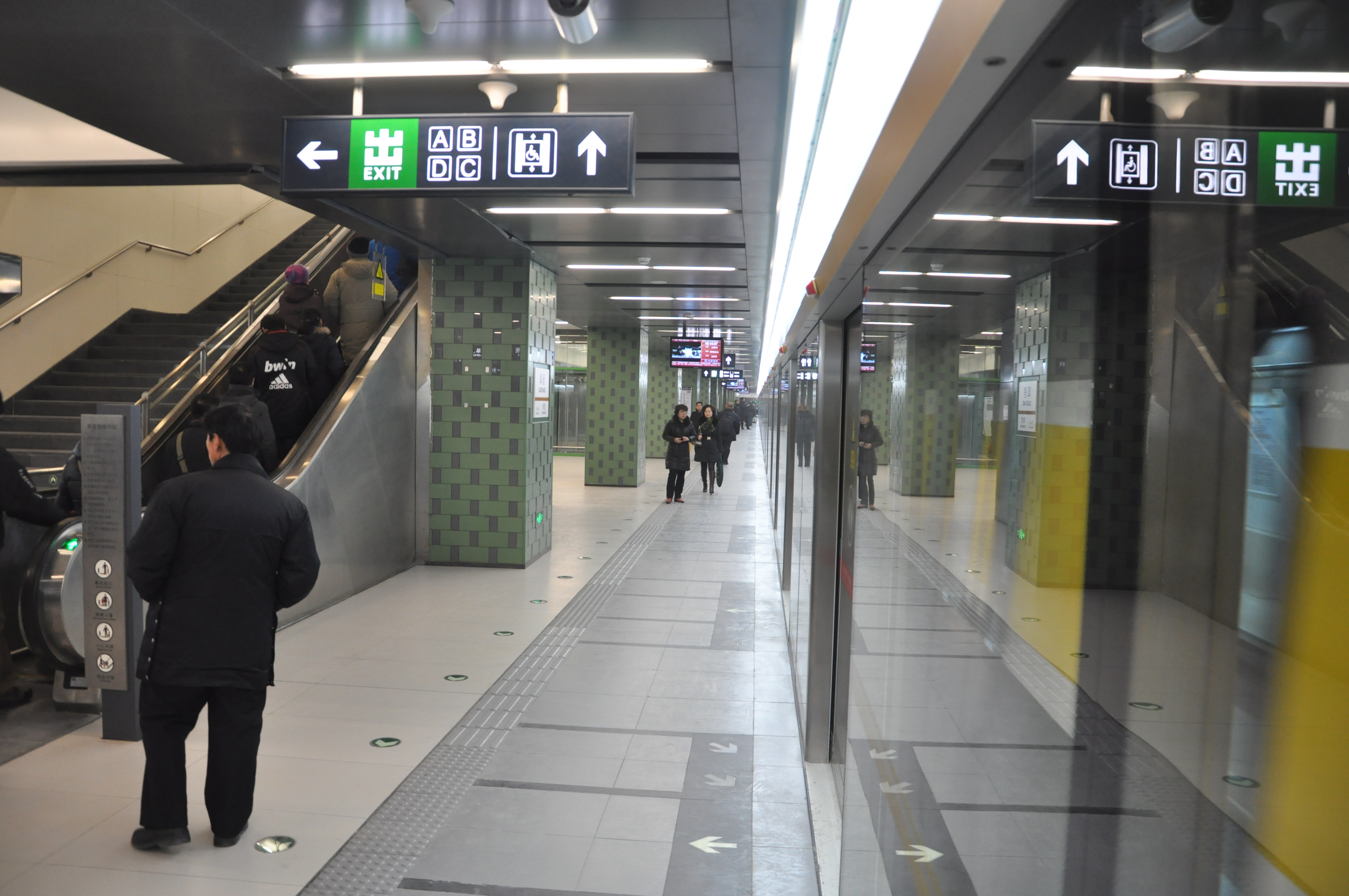
Station platform
