= Huangqu station =

Beijing Subway station

Coordinates: 39.9242°N 116.5782°E

Huangqu 黄渠
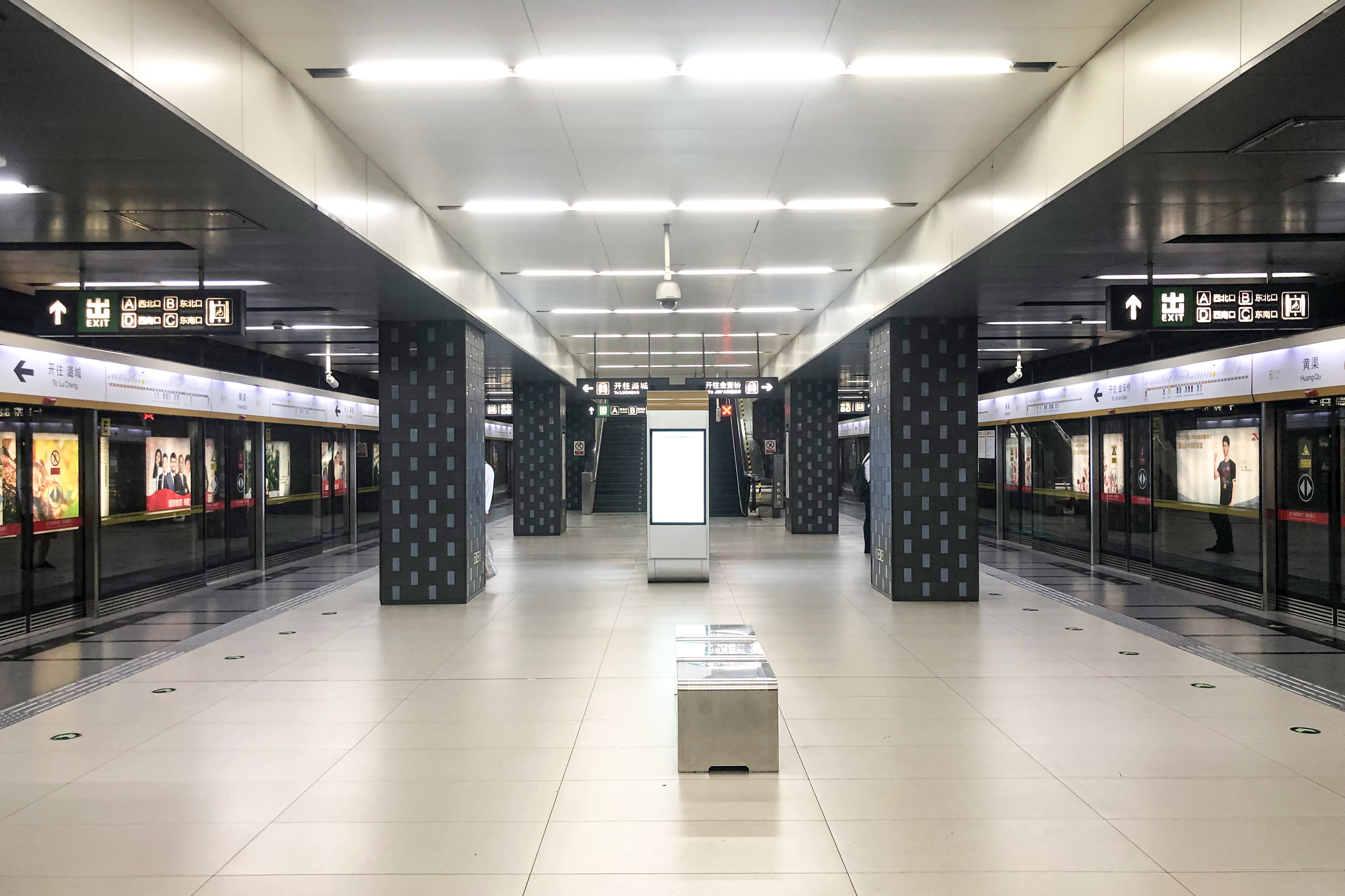
- Platform

General information
- Location: East Huangqu Road (黄渠东路) and North Chaoyang Road (朝阳北路); Chaoyang District, Beijing; China
- Operator: Beijing Mass Transit Railway Operation Corporation Limited
- Line: Line 6
- Platforms: 2 (1 island platform)
- Tracks: 2

Construction
- Structure type: Underground
- Accessible: Yes

History
- Opened: December 30, 2012; 13 years ago

Services
Preceding station	Beijing Subway	Following station
Dalianpo towards Jin'anqiao	Line 6	Changying towards Luyang
Location
- Location within Beijing

Huangqu (simplified Chinese: 黄渠站; traditional Chinese: 黃渠站; pinyin: Huángqú Zhàn) is a station on Line 6 of the Beijing Subway. This station opened on December 30, 2012.

== Station layout ==
The station has an underground island platform.

== Exits ==
There are 4 exits, lettered A, B, C, and D. Exit D is accessible.
