= Shilipu station (Beijing Subway) =

Beijing Subway station

Shilipu 十里堡
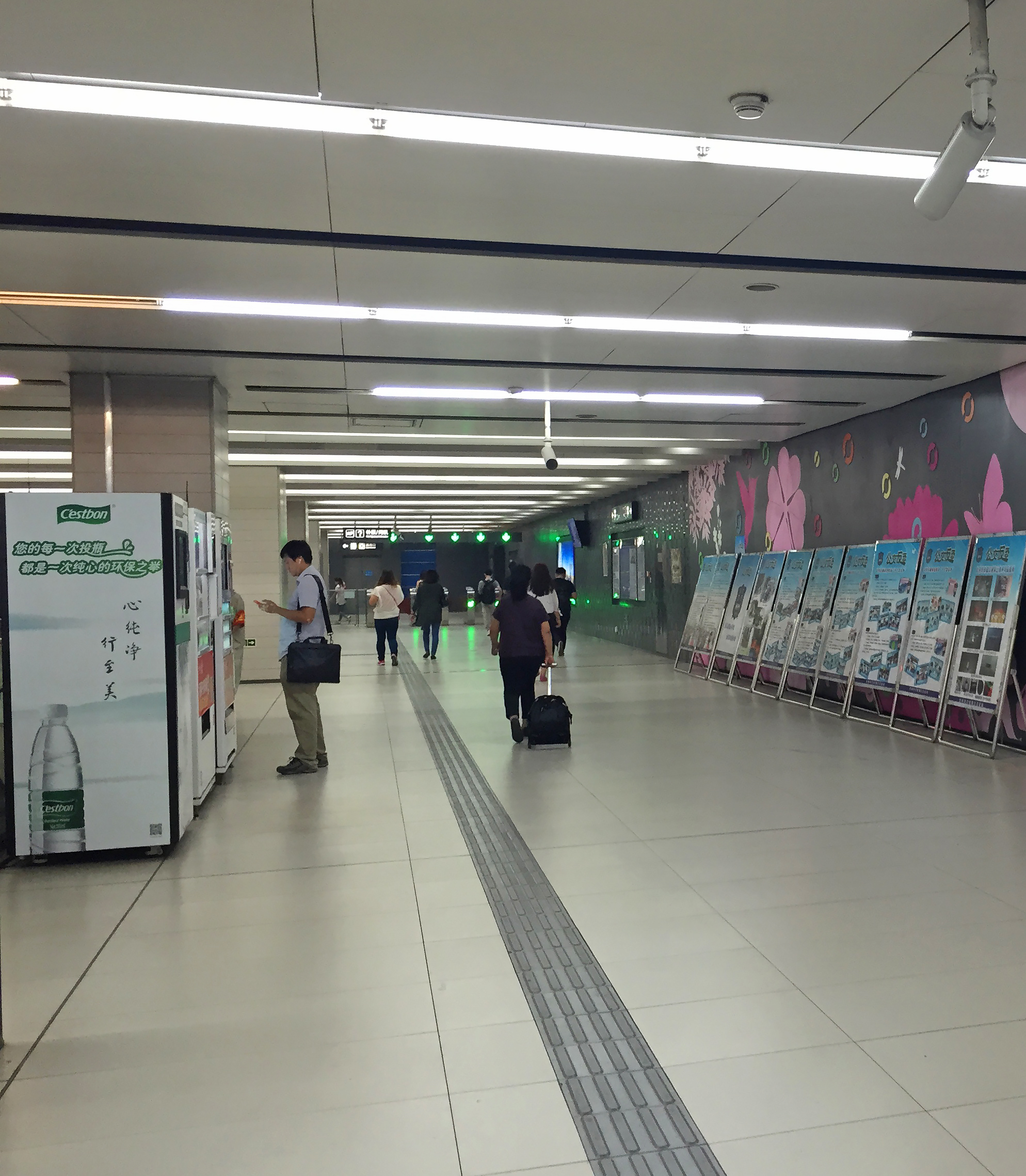
- Concourse

General information
- Location: Shifoying Road (石佛营路) / Shilipu Road (十里堡路) and North Chaoyang Road (朝阳北路); Chaoyang District, Beijing; China
- Coordinates: 39.921597°N 116.496192°E
- Operator: Beijing Mass Transit Railway Operation Corporation Limited
- Line: Line 6
- Platforms: 2 (1 island platform)
- Tracks: 2

Construction
- Structure type: Underground
- Accessible: Yes

History
- Opened: December 30, 2012; 13 years ago

Services
Preceding station	Beijing Subway	Following station
Jintai Lu towards Jin'anqiao	Line 6	Qingnian Lu towards Luyang
Location
- Location within Beijing

Shilipu (Chinese: 十里堡站; pinyin: Shílǐpù Zhàn) is a station on Line 6 of the Beijing Subway. This station opened on December 30, 2012.

== Station layout ==
The station has an underground island platform.

== Exits ==
There are 3 exits, lettered B, C, and D. Exits B and C are accessible.
