= Line 6 (Beijing Subway) =

Railway line in Beijing, China

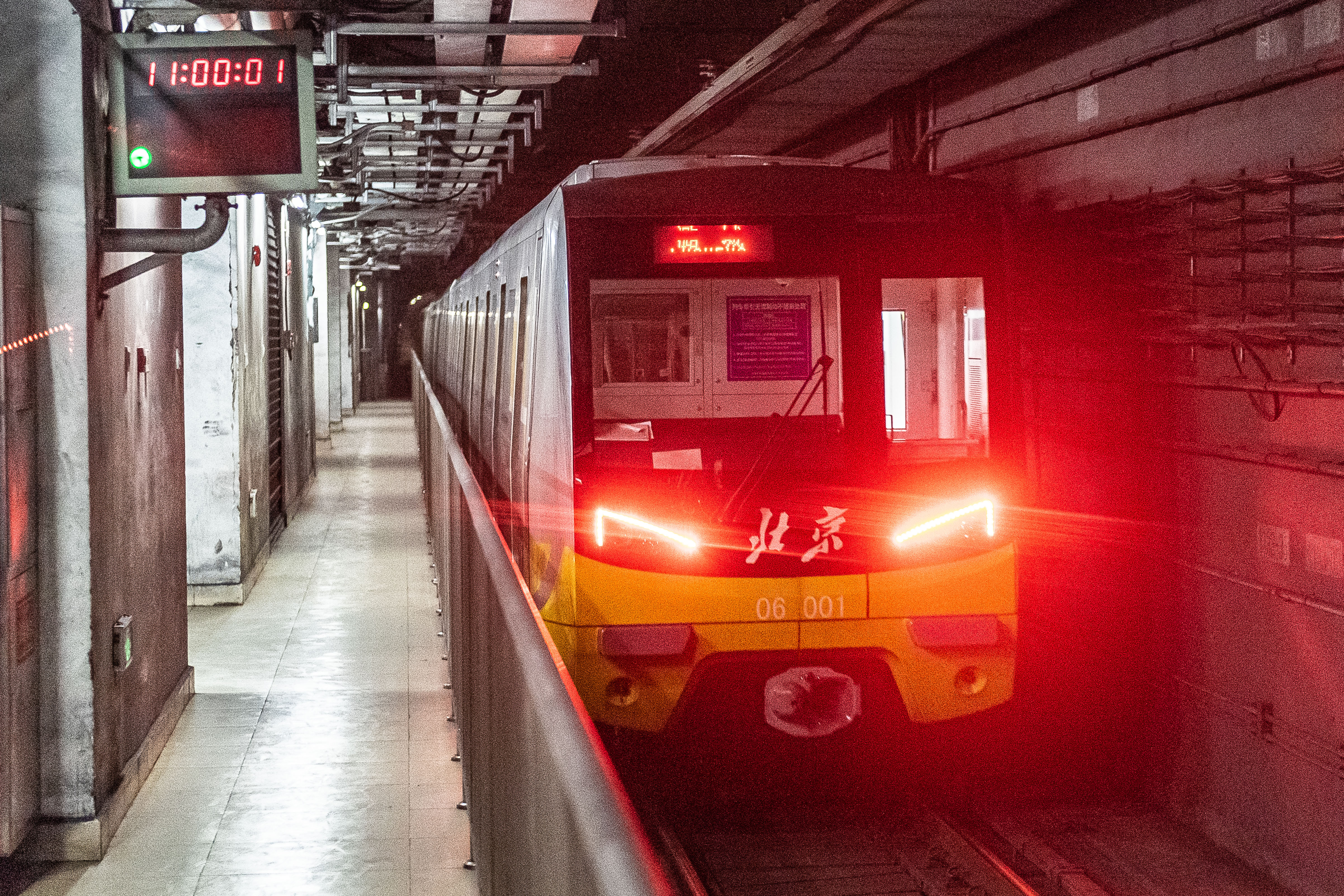
- A Line 6 train leaving Dalianpo station

Overview
- Other name: M6 (planned name)
- Status: Operational
- Locale: Tongzhou, Chaoyang, Dongcheng, Xicheng, Haidian and Shijingshan districts Beijing
- Termini: Jin'anqiao; Luyang
- Stations: 36 (in operation)

Service
- Type: Rapid transit
- System: Beijing Subway
- Operator: Beijing Mass Transit Railway Operation Corp., Ltd
- Depot(s): Wulu yard, Wuliqiao, Dongxiaoying
- Rolling stock: 8-car Type B (DKZ47)
- Daily ridership: 857,800 (2024 Avg.); 1.07 million (2018 peak)

History
- Opened: December 30, 2012; 13 years ago

Technical
- Line length: 55.0 km (34.2 mi)
- Character: Underground
- Track gauge: 1,435 mm (4 ft 8 1/2 in) standard gauge
- Electrification: 1,500 V DC from overhead catenary
- Operating speed: 100 km/h (62 mph)

Line 6 of the Beijing Subway (Chinese: 北京地铁6号线; pinyin: běijīng dìtiě liùhào xiàn) is a rapid transit line in Beijing. The line runs from Jin'anqiao in Shijingshan District to Luyang in Tongzhou District. It serves important residential areas such as Changying, Chaoqing, and Dingfuzhuang, in addition to important commercial and business areas such as Financial Street, Beijing CBD and the sub-administrative center in Tongzhou District. Like Line 7, Line 6 provides relief to the parallel Line 1, which is the second most used subway line in Beijing, after Line 10. Line 6 is the second longest subway line in Beijing (only Line 10 is longer). A complete journey from end to end takes about an hour and 25 minutes on a local train and express trains reducing end to end travel time by 7 minutes.

Line 6 uses 8-car Type B train sets accommodating 1,960 people. Such trains are only found on lines 6 and 7. The trains are capable of reaching the speed of 100 km/h (62 mph). Stations to the east of the 3rd Ring Road to Tongzhou are more widely spaced, the furthest being 4 km (2.5 mi) apart. Line 6 also has the deepest station in the network, Dongsi station, which is 34 metres (112 ft) underground. The line is the first line to 1500 V overhead catenary as opposed to 750 V third rail used on all earlier lines. Some of the station arrangements were the first of their kind in Beijing. Beijing's first split platform station, Nanluoguxiang station, and stations equipped with passing tracks, opened on Line 6. Line 6's color is ocher.

== Ridership ==
Line 6 was projected to have a short term volume of 700,000 passengers per day and a long term daily passenger traffic of 1.4 million passengers. Though due to its alignment through some of Beijing's densest residential neighborhoods and paralleling the overcapacity and busy Line 1, some industry leaders believed that the average daily passenger flow of the line may reach 1.4 million passengers per day sooner than expected. Within the first few months of operation, weekday ridership was at 320,000 passengers. However, by 2014, daily ridership had risen to 700,000 with sections operating at 100% capacity during rush hour. Authorities responded by adding more trains and shortening headway to reduce crowding on the line. By 2019, daily average weekday ridership on Line 6 exceeds 1 million riders.

== Stations ==
Stations from west to east:

Service Route		Station name		Connections	Nearby bus stops	Distance km		Location
L	Ex	English	Chinese	Connections	Nearby bus stops	Distance km		Location
●	●	Jin'anqiao	金安桥	S1 11	325 336 337 358 370 396 472 489 502 892 920 921 929 931 932 941 941快 948 959 961 977 977快 981 BRT4(快速公交4) 快速直达专线135 快速直达专线142 快速直达专线150 M3 M4 M5 M6 M7 M11 M16 M20 M22 专61 专110 专148 专198	0.000	0.000	Shijingshan
●	●	Pingguoyuan	苹果园	1 S1	325 336 358 370 396 399 472 527 597 892 920 929 931 932 941快 948 961 972 977 977快 981 M3 M4 M5 M6 M7 M11 M16 M20 M22	1.438	1.438	Shijingshan
●	●	Yangzhuang	杨庄		325 336 358 370 396 399 472 527 597 663 921 932 941快 958 961 972 977 977快 981 BRT4(快速公交4) 快速直达专线111 专108 专152 专210	0.839	2.277	Shijingshan
●	●	Xihuangcun	西黄村		336 370 389 875 941快 977 981	1.792	4.069	Shijingshan
●	●	Liaogongzhuang	廖公庄		336 370 373 389 688 875 914 941快 977 981	1.794	5.863	
●	●	Tiancun	田村		336 389 568 610 688 941快 977 981 BRT4(快速公交4) 专109 专129 专147	2.276	8.139	
●	●	Haidian Wuluju	海淀五路居		61 73 92 121 334 335 336 400 400快 414 450 469 505 507 611 644 653 658 683 688 698 952 981 982 夜3 夜13 专98	2.140	10.279	Haidian
●	●	Cishou Si	慈寿寺	10	33 40 61 73 85 481 507 632 夜3 专98	1.508	11.787	Haidian
●	●	Huayuan Qiao	花园桥		4 27 61 73 74 77 86 118 300 323 368 394 437 603 634 645 653 693 967 夜3 夜30	1.431	13.218	Haidian
●	●	Baishiqiaonan	白石桥南	9	4 27 61 86 92 114 118 320 653 693 夜3	1.166	14.384	Haidian
●	●	Erligou	二里沟	16	4 102 103 114 118 320 693 夜3	0.777	15.161	Haidian / Xicheng
●	●	Chegongzhuangxi	车公庄西		4 15 19 26 56 94 107 118 129 693 夜3	0.888	16.048	Xicheng
●	●	Chegongzhuang	车公庄	2	4 19 21 44 69 80 107 118 200 332 387 618 632 686 693 夜3 夜8 夜20 专216	0.887	16.935	Xicheng
●	●	Ping'anli	平安里	4 19	4 7 13 22 38 47 88 105 107 111 118 143 409 夜3 夜4 夜36	1.443	18.378	Xicheng
●	●	Beihaibei	北海北		3 4 13 107 111 118 612 观光3 夜3	1.321	19.699	Xicheng
●	●	Nanluogu Xiang	南锣鼓巷	8	3 4 13 60 82 118 612 夜2 夜3	1.349	21.048	Dongcheng
●	●	Dongsi	东四	5	58 84 101 106 109 110 128 夜13	1.937	22.985	Dongcheng
●	●	Chaoyang Men	朝阳门	2	44 58 75 101 109 110 139 142 200 BRT2(快速公交2) 通医专线3 夜13 夜20	1.399	24.384	Dongcheng / Chaoyang
●	●	Dongdaqiao	东大桥	17	28 39 75 98 101 109 110 118 120 126 139 350 403 412 515 615 BRT2(快速公交2) 夜13 夜24 专5 专114	1.668	26.052	Chaoyang
●	●	Hujialou	呼家楼	10	75 113 115 126 140 350 368 405 412 650 671 687 BRT2(快速公交2) 夜30 夜34 专5 专114	0.845	26.897	Chaoyang
●	●	Jintai Lu	金台路	14	9 31 75 117 126 135 140 412 419 486 640 682 973 985 988	1.450	28.347	Chaoyang
●	●	Shilipu	十里堡		75 126 138 140 486 640 675 682 991 夜3	2.036	30.383	Chaoyang
●	●	Qingnian Lu	青年路		75 126 363 419 451 468 499 553 605 675 682 911 991 夜3 夜13 专50 专72 专194	1.282	31.665	Chaoyang
●	｜	Dalianpo	褡裢坡		499 517 675 911	3.999	35.664	Chaoyang
●	｜	Huangqu	黄渠		499 517 583 675 911	1.238	36.902	Chaoyang
●	｜	Changying	常营		411 488 586 587 639 675 911 专39	1.854	38.756	Chaoyang
●	｜	Caofang	草房		306 435 488 499 517 587 639 675 824 911 快速直达专线30 快速直达专线105 专39 专175	1.405	40.161	Chaoyang
●	｜	Wuzi Xueyuan Lu	物资学院路		435 587 675 813 824 911 快速直达专线185 T6 T8 T111 专158	2.115	42.276	Tongzhou
●	｜	Tongzhou Beiguan	通州北关		316 342 435 582 587 911 924 快速直达专线43 T37 T48 T70 T79 T114 通医专线15 专64 专77 专88 专157	2.557	44.833	Tongzhou
●	｜	Tongyun Men	通运门		322 435 589 666 667 804 806 T6 T19 T41 T48 T62 T71 夜27	1.468	46.301	Tongzhou
●	｜	Beiyunhexi	北运河西		317 552 809 913 T18 T44 T45 T60 T71 T107 T112 专208 专221	1.543	47.844	Tongzhou
●	｜	Beiyunhedong	北运河东		312 442 587 649 666 T45 T109 T115 夜29 专203	1.599	49.443	Tongzhou
●	●	Haojia Fu	郝家府		312 442 587 649 666 803 T58 T88 快速直达专线19 夜29 专203 专206	0.929	50.372	Tongzhou
●	●	Dongxia Yuan	东夏园		312 442 649 803 804 816 819 822 893 894 T41 T45 T58 T88 T116 T120 快速直达专线19 通医专线12 夜29 专82 专118 专203 专206	1.346	51.718	Tongzhou
●	●	Lucheng	潞城		312 442 804 816 816快 819 822 893 894 T20 T41 T45 T116 T120 T122 通医专线12 夜29 专82 专118 专203	1.194	52.912	Tongzhou
●	●	Luyang	潞阳		专205	2.057	54.969	Tongzhou

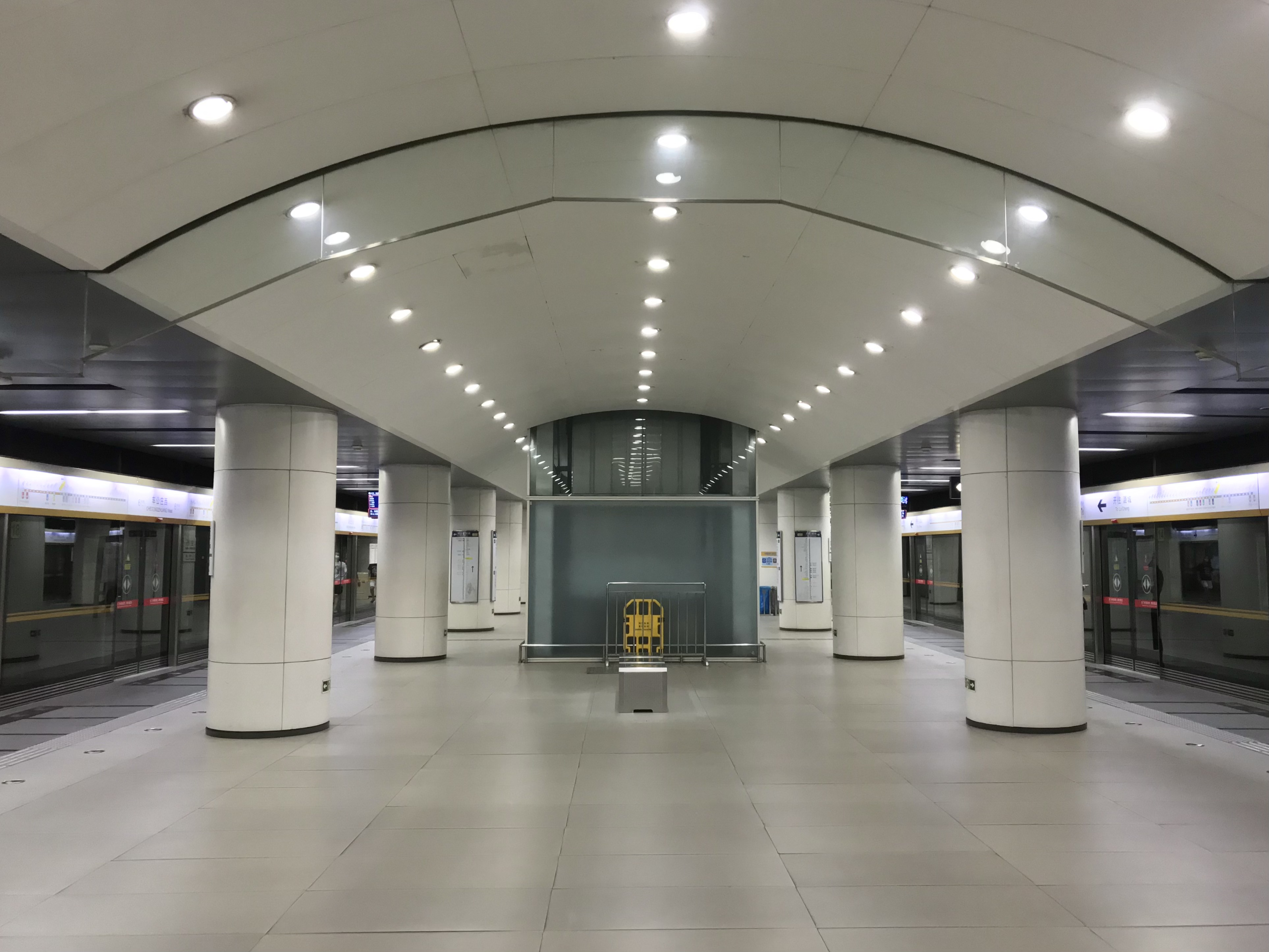
Chegongzhuangxi station

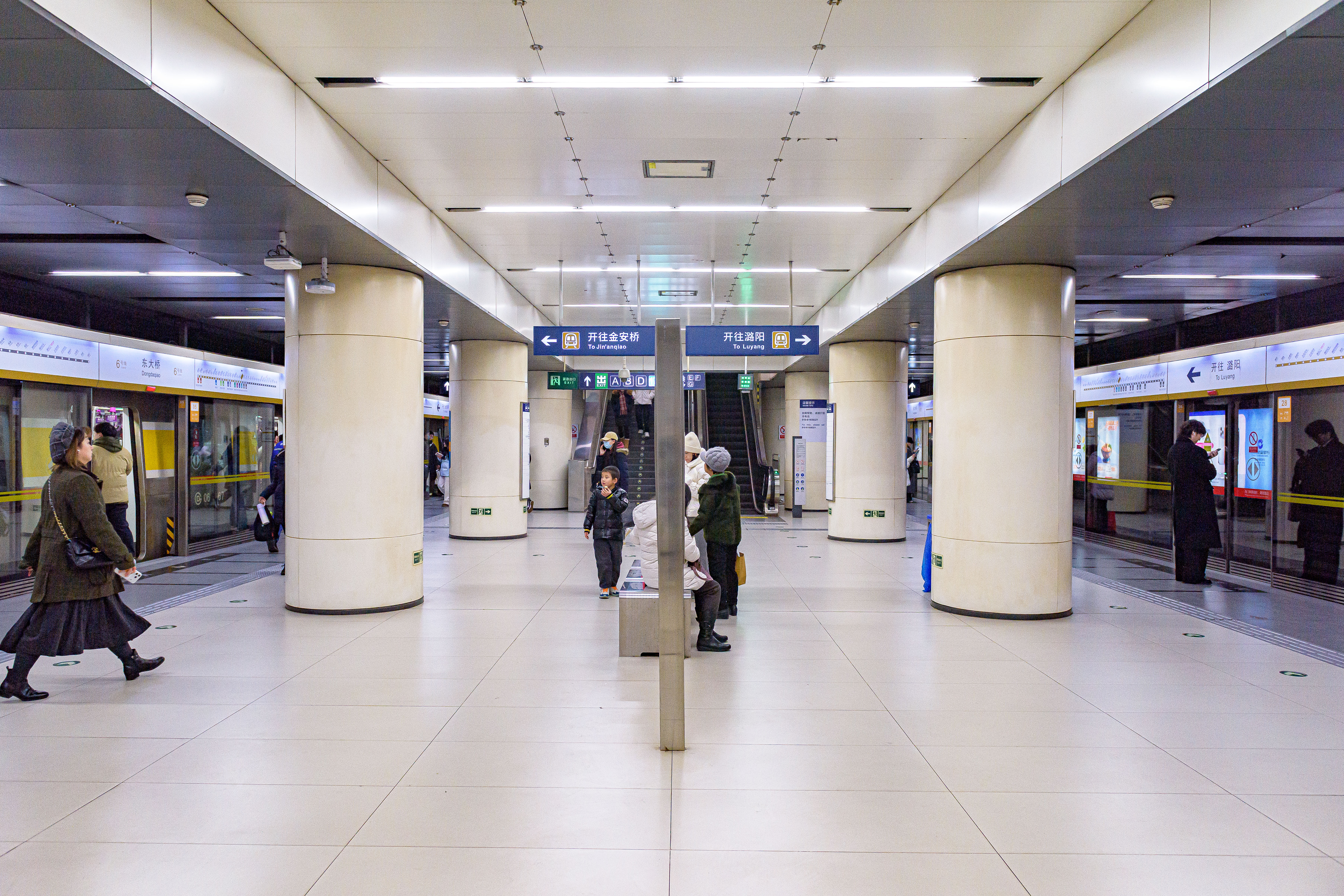
Dongdaqiao station

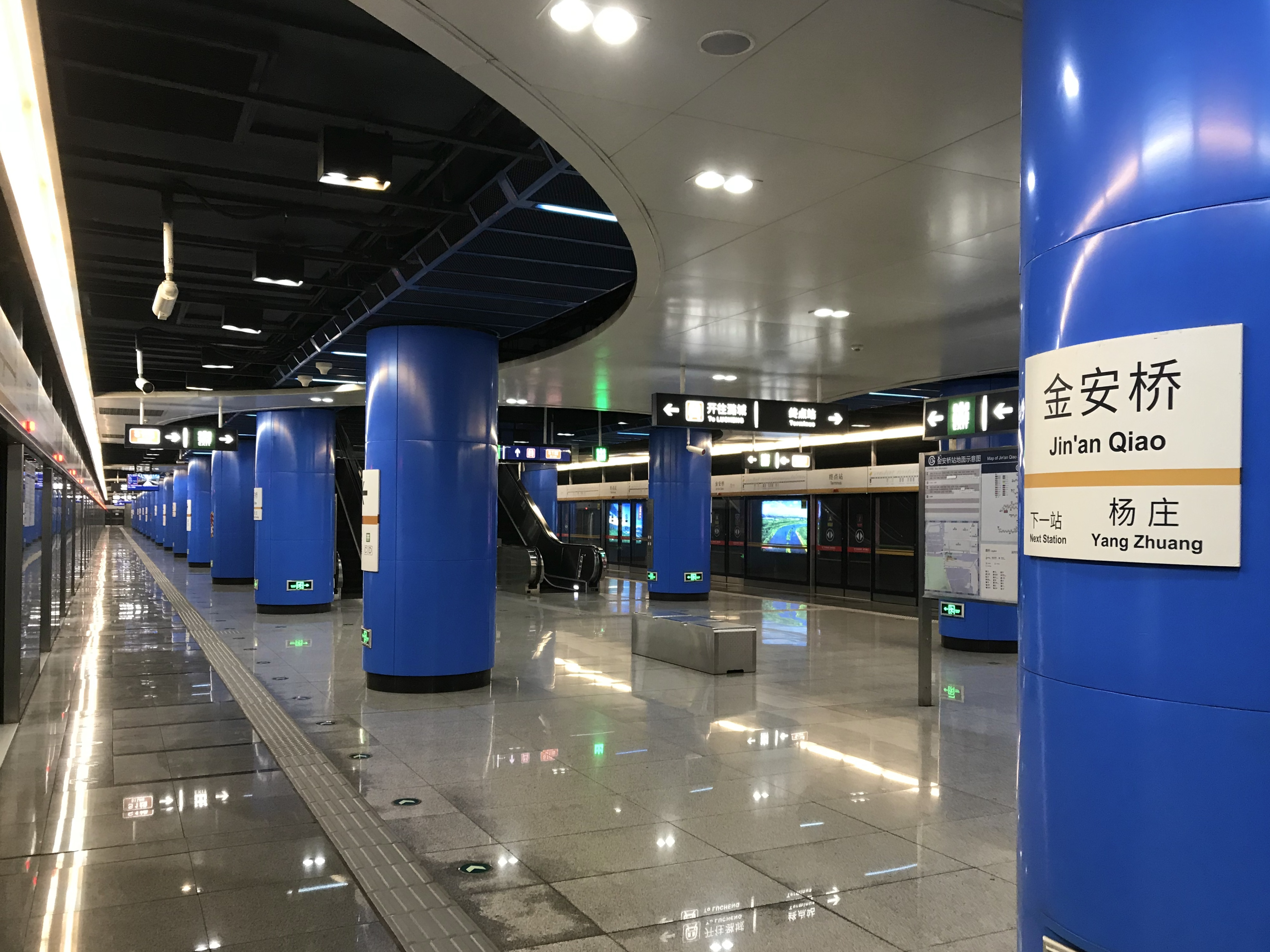
Jin'anqiao station

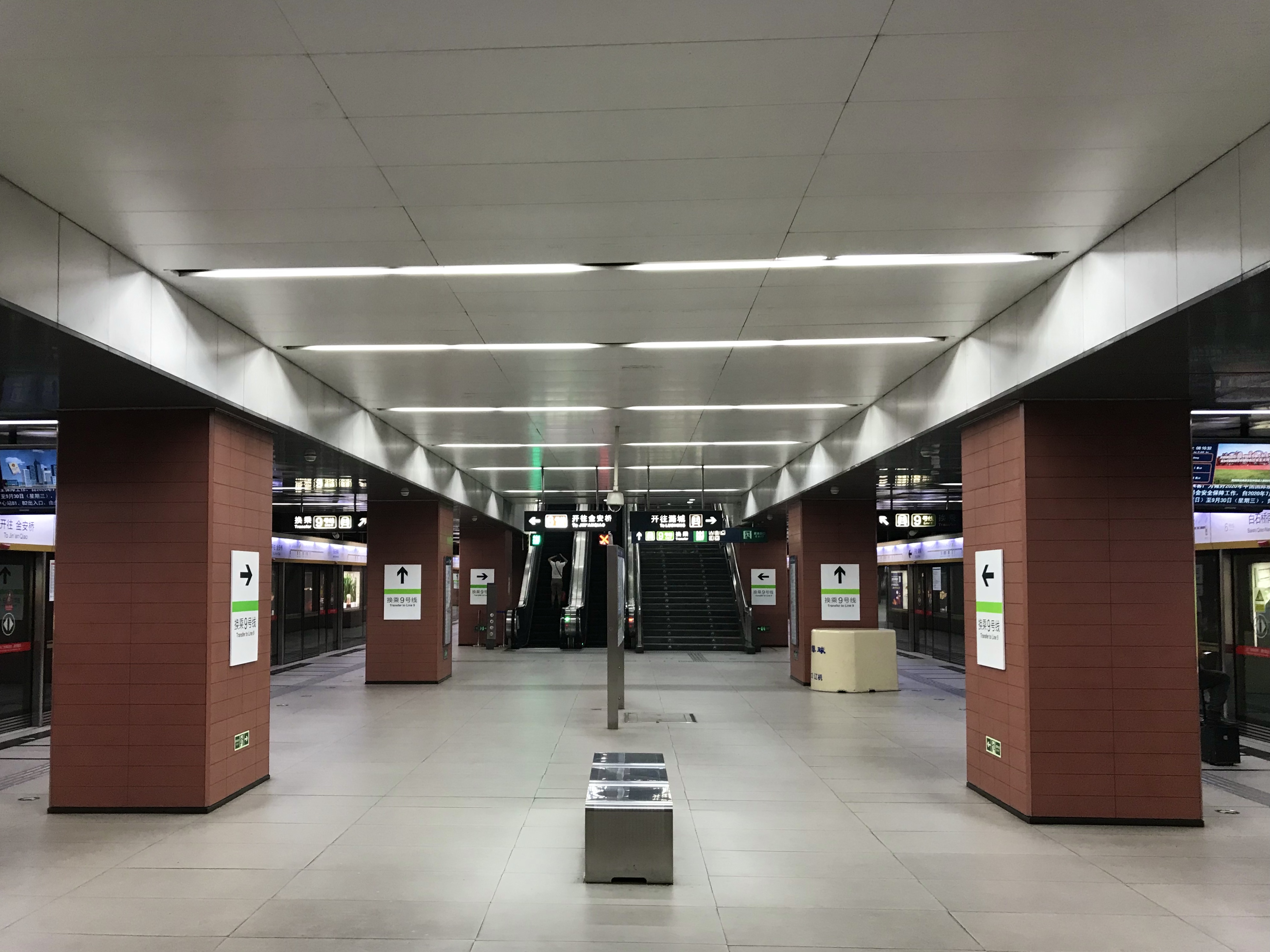
Baishiqiaonan station

== History ==
=== Planning ===
Line 6 was originally planned to be an east–west line passing under Chaoyang Avenue continuing straight westward. However, this alignment would make the central section of Line 6 tunnel extremely close to the Forbidden City. Issues of historic conservation and protection were raised against the proposed alignment. To avoid damaging cultural relics in the area, the entire western and middle section of line 6 was shifted 1.5 km (0.93 mi) northward to Ping'an Avenue, forming the route of Line 6 today. As of October 2007, Line 6 was planned to feature both express and local stations, but those plans have not been incorporated into the construction of Phase I. Line 6 started construction on December 8, 2007, as one of the "horizontal" east–west lines of the "three-ring, four horizontal and five vertical and seven radial" Beijing Subway masterplan. Construction is planned in three phases, the first phase in central Beijing, followed by extensions into the eastern and western suburbs.

=== Phase I ===
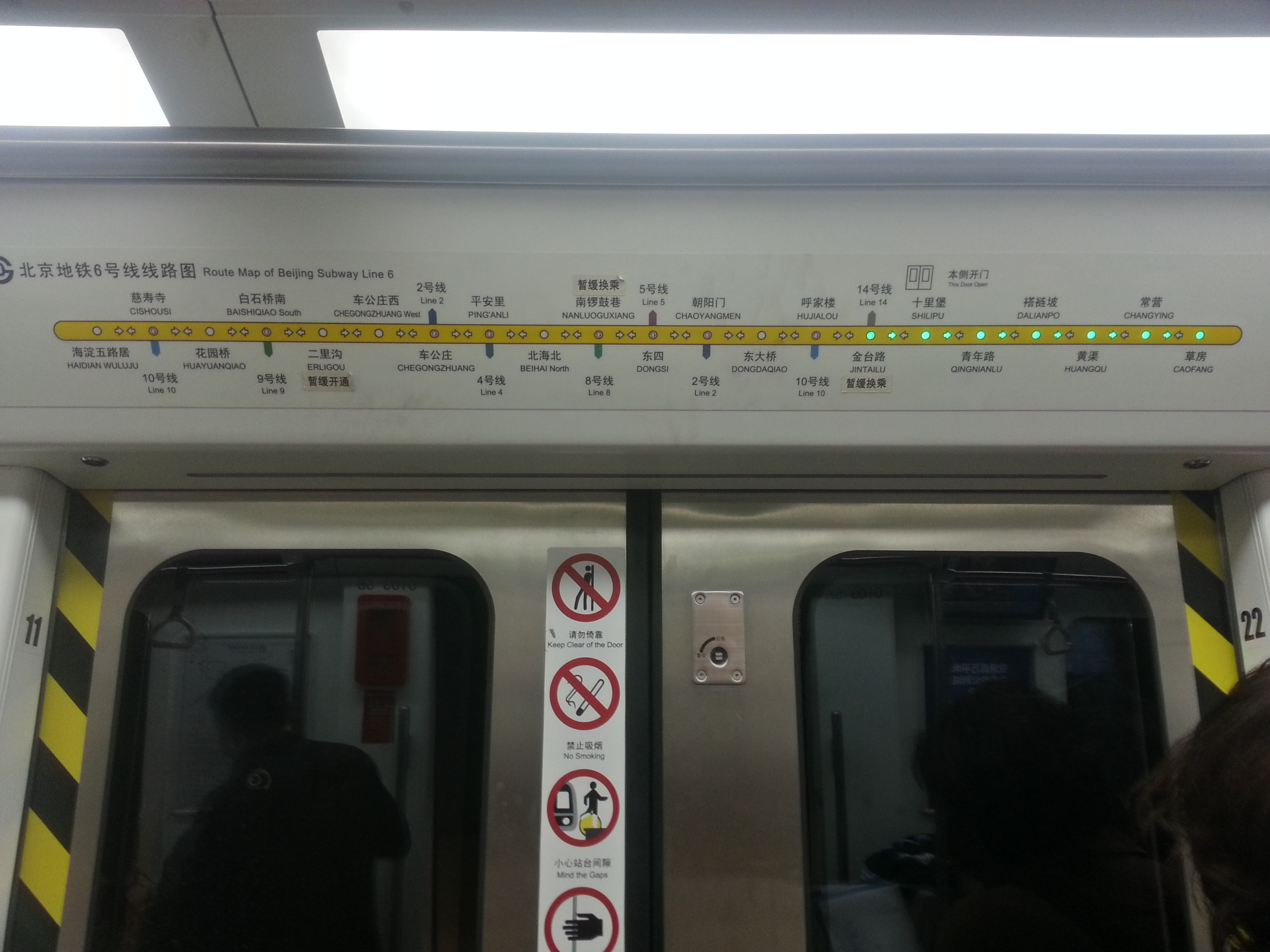
Route map of Line 6 Phase I

In Phase I, Line 6 runs 30 km (19 mi) from Haidian Wuluju in Haidian District to Caofang in Chaoyang District following Linglong Road, Sanlihe Road, Chaoyang North Road, the west bank of the Grand Canal, and Yunhe East Road. In Phase I, there were 21 stations, including Erligou station, which opened on 18 March 2023.

Construction began in December 2007 and was completed in 2012. On March 22, 2010, the tunneling work on Line 6 commenced near Shilipu in Chaoyang District. Total investment for Phase I was estimated at ¥19.7 billion.

Line 6 in Phase I was originally slated to have elevated tracks for 7 km (4.3 mi), east of the 5th Ring Road, from Dingfuzhuang and Changying. After residents along the route raised concerns about train noise, planners reconsidered and ultimately decided to keep all of Phase I underground. This made the first phase of Line 6 completely underground.

=== Phase II (eastern extension) ===
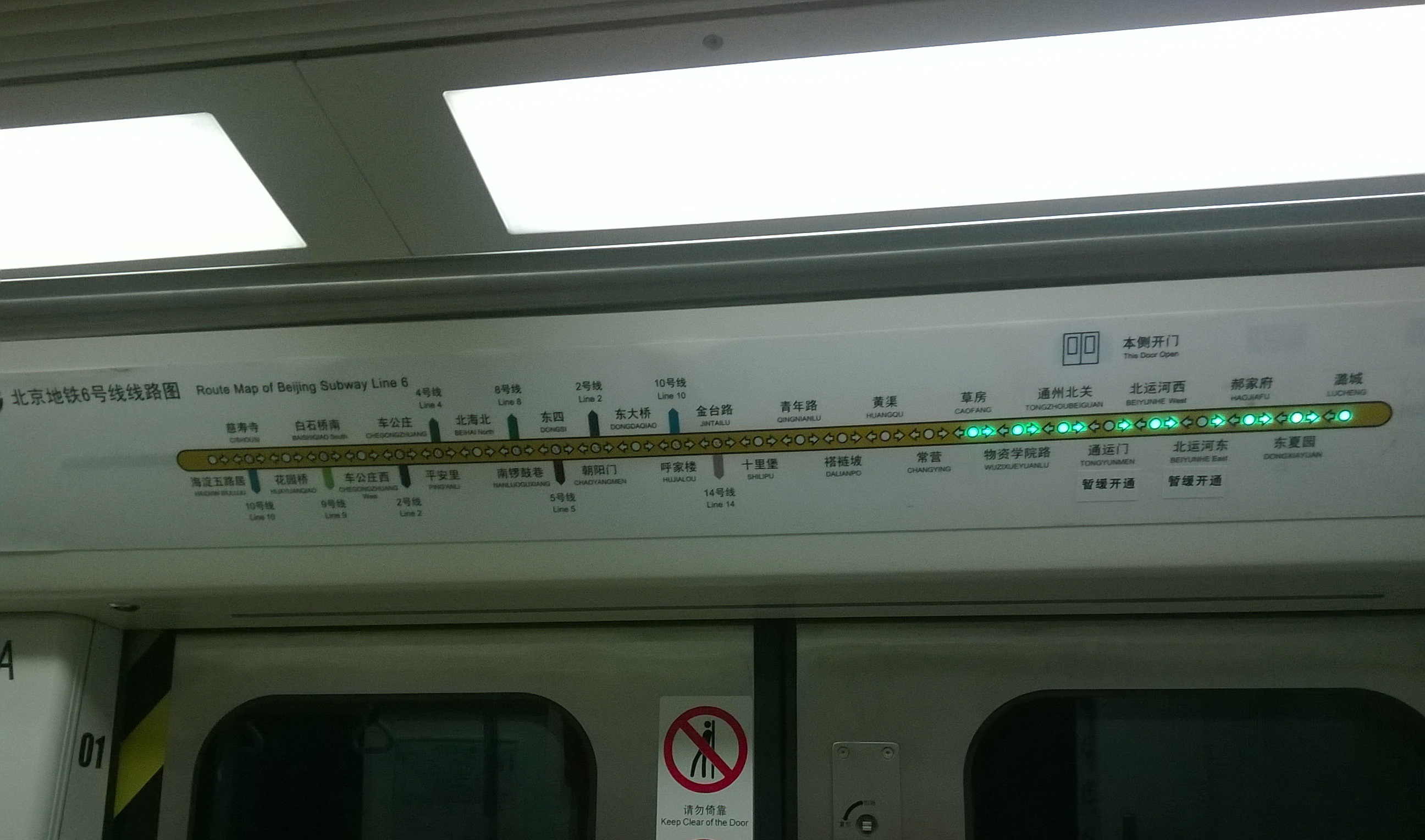
Route map of Line 6 Phase I & Phase II

As of November 2010, plans for Phase II contained plans for distinct express and local stations. In Phase II, which opened in 2014, Line 6 was extended further east by about 12.8 km (8.0 mi) through six stations from Caofang to Lucheng in Tongzhou District. Beiyunhedong station opened on 30 December 2018. Like Phase I, the Phase II track is entirely underground.

The extension was designed to have express and local services using passing tracks at select stations. However, due to a shortage of rolling stock, express services have yet to be implemented when the Phase II opens in 2014. In 2018, the government announced that sufficient rolling stock had arrived to begin implementing an express service. Express services started operating on March 31, 2020.

=== Phase III (western extension) ===
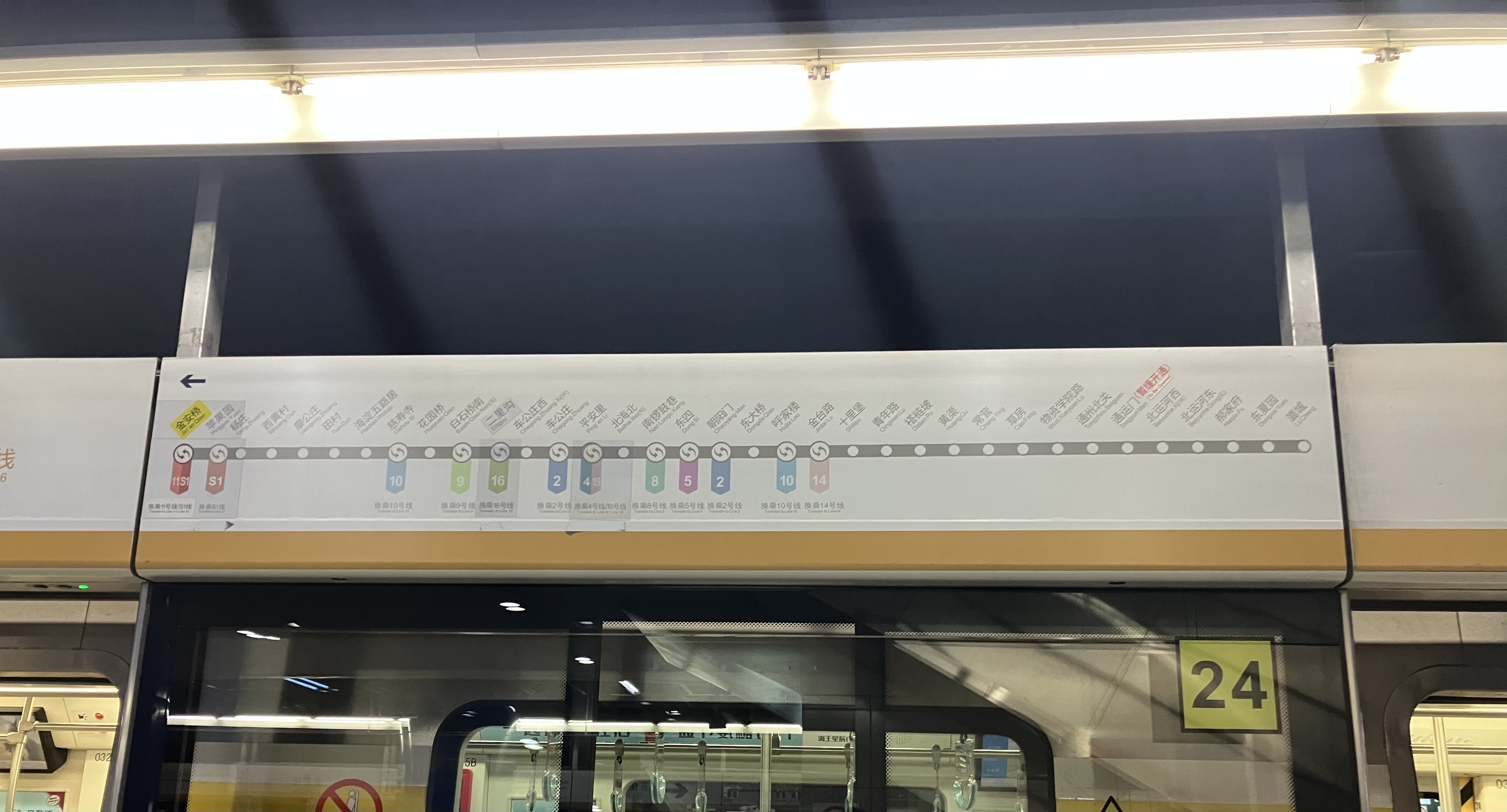
Route map of Line 6 Phase I & Phase II & Phase III

Line 6 was originally planned to terminate at Cishousi station with Line S1 continuing the line westward. In 2011, because of issues of low capacity and electromagnetic radiation concerns of Maglev technology, city planning authorities proposed to detach several stations from Line S1. This would extend Line 6 for 10.556 km (6.559 mi) west with six stations from Jin'anqiao to Haidian Wuluju (the western terminus of Phase I). All stations are underground. This replaced the Line S1 section between Cishousi and Pingguoyuan station. Later the plan was revised with Line 6 being further extended westward beyond Pingguoyuan to Jin'anqiao station, paralleling Line S1. The revision was formalized and submitted to the National Development and Reform Commission for review in March 2012. Phase III opened in 2018, along with Beiyunhedong station, a Phase II station.

When Line 6 Phase III first entered operation, Pingguoyuan station was not opened. In December 2021, the station was opened as an interchange between Line 6 and Line S1. Plans for an interchange with Line 1 at Pingguoyuan were delayed by a renovation of the station, which began in April 2020 and was due to be completed by the end of 2023. However, due to construction delays, it did not reopen until May 16, 2026, when interchange was finally available with Line 1.

=== South extension of Phase II ===
The one-station Southern extension of Phase II from Lucheng to Luyang is 2.057 km in length and fully underground. Construction started on August 30, 2022. It opened on December 27, 2025.

=== Opening timeline ===
Segment	Commencement	Length	Station(s)	Name
Haidian Wuluju — Caofang	30 December 2012	29.882 km (18.57 mi)	20	Phase 1
Caofang — Lucheng	28 December 2014	12.751 km (7.92 mi)	6	Phase 2
Beiyunhedong	30 December 2018	Infill station	1	
Jin'anqiao — Haidian Wuluju	30 December 2018	10.556 km (6.56 mi)	5	Phase 3
Pingguoyuan	31 December 2021	Infill station	1	
Erligou	18 March 2023	Infill station	1	
Lucheng — Luyang	27 December 2025	2.1 km (1.30 mi)	1	Phase 2 south extension
Tongyun Men	30 June 2026	Infill station	1	

== Future development ==
=== Southern extension to Tongzhou Dagantang ===
A southern extension from Luyang to Tongzhou Dagantang (near Dagantang in Lucheng, Tongzhou District, Beijing) is under planning. Tongzhou Dagantang station is also known as Hulang Lu station (Chinese: 胡郎路站; pinyin: Húláng Lù zhàn; lit. 'Hulang Road station'). The road called "Hulang Road" is located closer to Luyang than Tongzhou Dagantang, so in recent official replies, the station use the name "Tongzhou Dagantang".

== Rolling stock ==
Model	Image	Manufacturer	Year built	Amount in Service	Fleet numbers	Depot
DKZ47		CRRC Changchun Railway Vehicles	2011; 2013; 2018	99	06 001–06 099	Wulu; Wuliqiao; Dongxiaoying
