= Chegongzhuangxi station =

Beijing Subway station

Coordinates: 39.931098°N 116.337992°E

Chegongzhuangxi 车公庄西
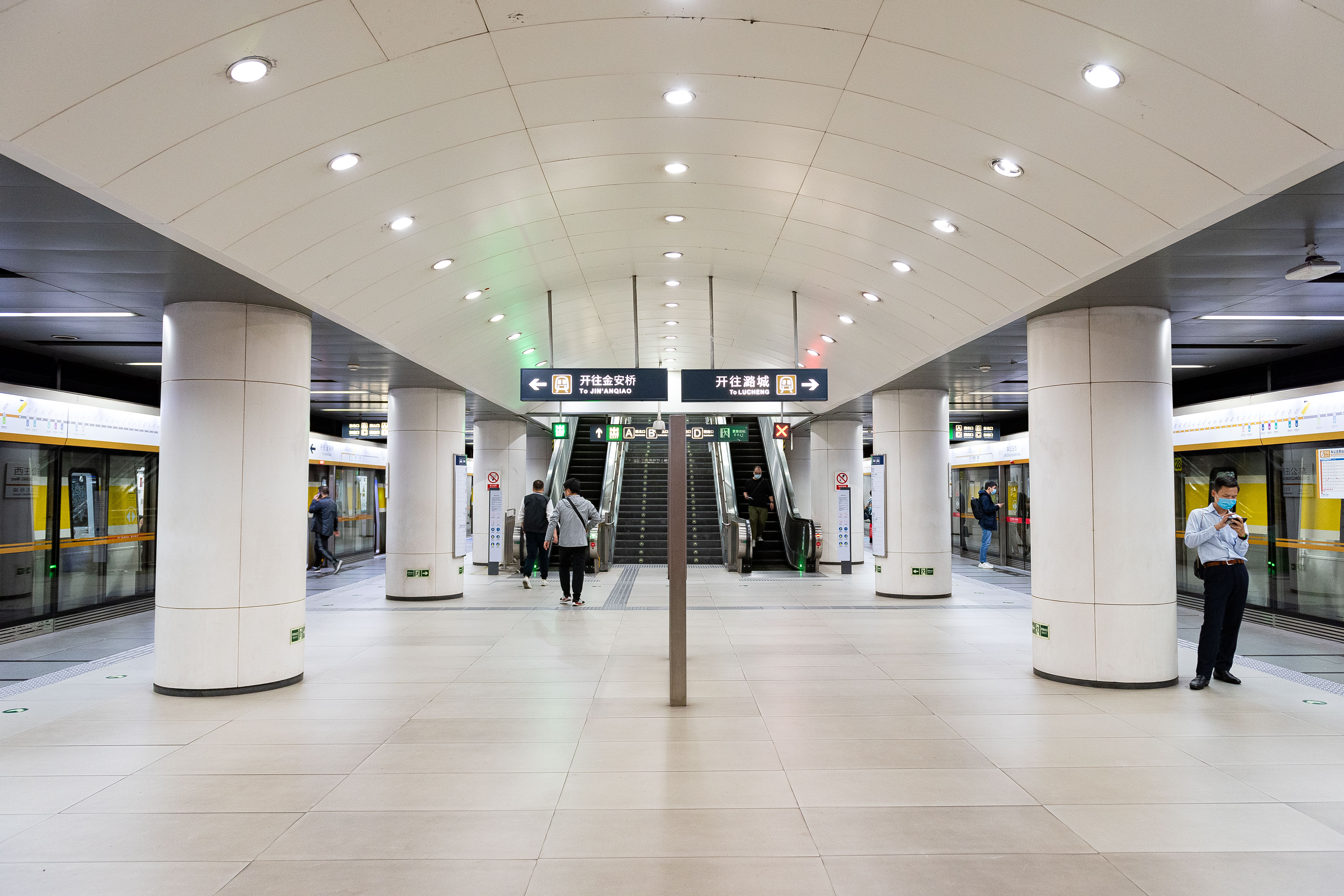
- Platform

General information
- Location: Chegongzhuang Street (车公庄大街) and Zhanlanguan Road; Xicheng District, Beijing; China
- Operator: Beijing Mass Transit Railway Operation Corporation Limited
- Line: Line 6
- Platforms: 2 (1 island platform)
- Tracks: 2

Construction
- Structure type: Underground
- Accessible: Yes

History
- Opened: December 30, 2012; 13 years ago

Services
Preceding station	Beijing Subway	Following station
Erligou towards Jin'anqiao	Line 6	Chegongzhuang towards Luyang
Location
- Location within Beijing

Chegongzhuangxi (simplified Chinese: 车公庄西站; traditional Chinese: 車公莊西站; pinyin: Chēgōngzhuāng Xī Zhàn) is a station on Line 6 of the Beijing Subway. This station opened on December 30, 2012.

== Station layout ==
The station has an underground island platform.

== Exits ==
There are 4 exits, lettered A, B, C, and D. Exits A and C are accessible.

== Gallery ==
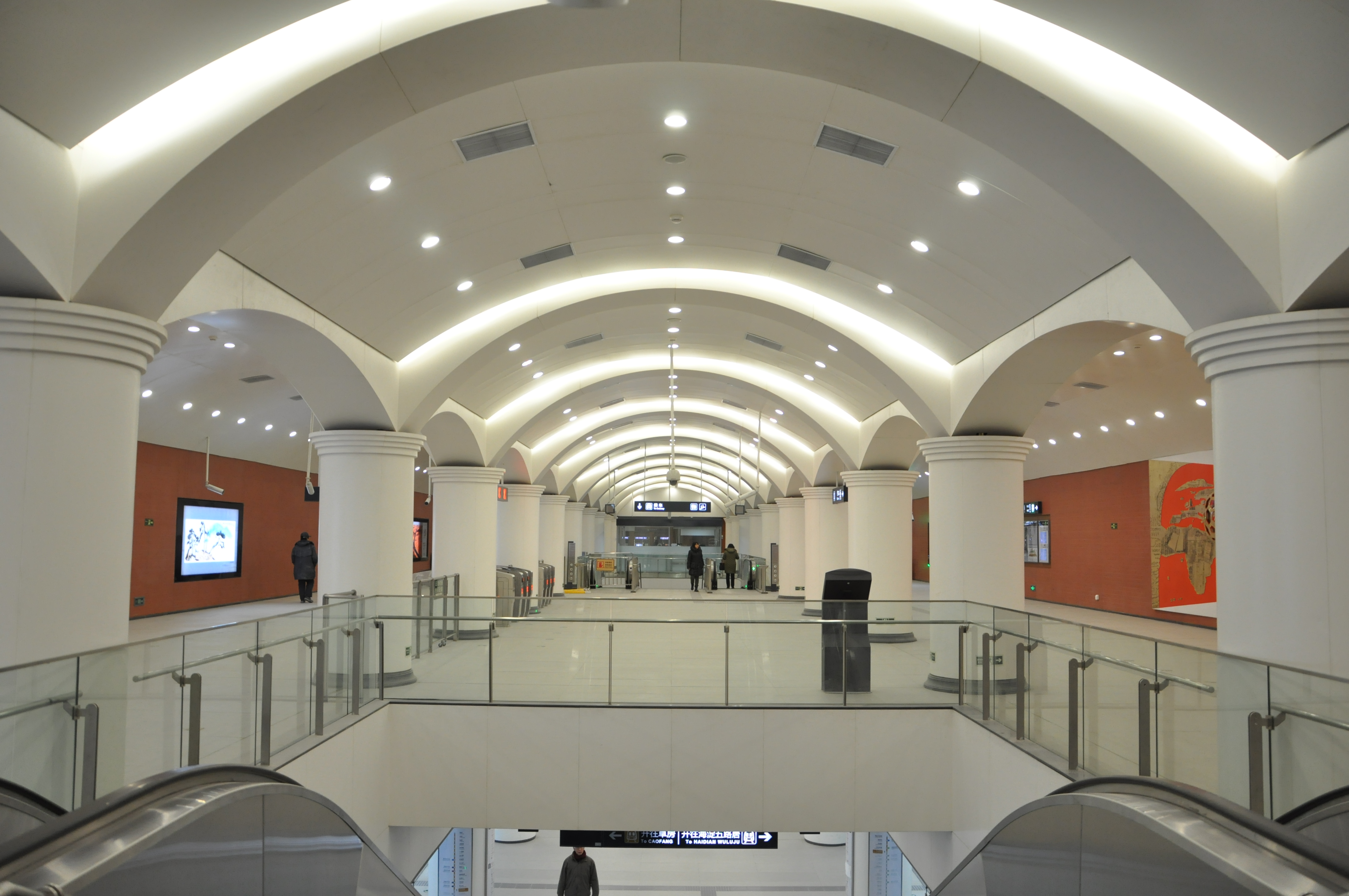
Concourse
