= Qingnian Lu station =

Beijing Subway station

Qingnian Lu 青年路
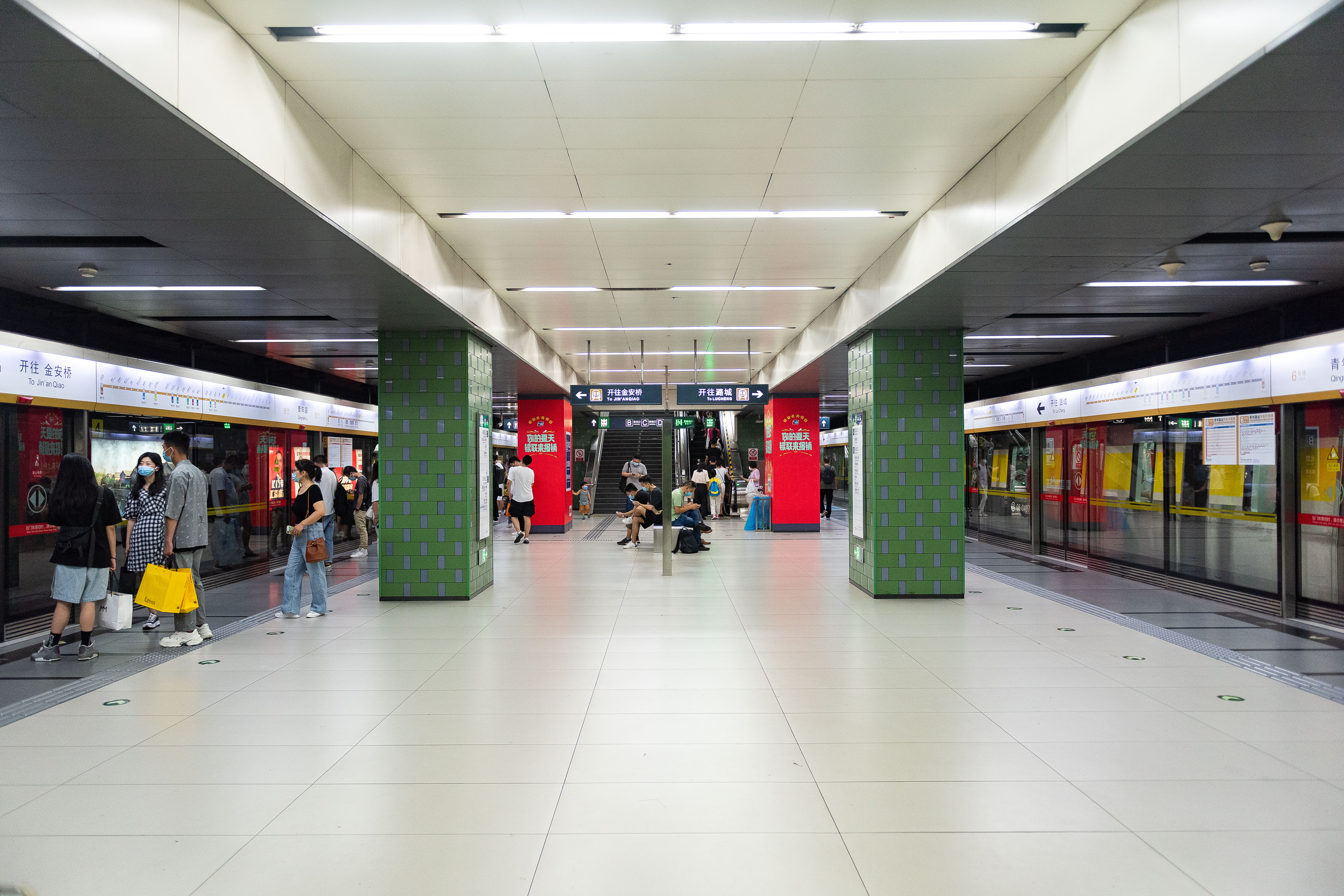
- Platform

General information
- Location: Qingnian Road (青年路) and North Chaoyang Road (朝阳北路); Chaoyang District, Beijing; China
- Coordinates: 39.923168°N 116.517429°E
- Operator: Beijing Mass Transit Railway Operation Corporation Limited
- Line: Line 6
- Platforms: 2 (1 island platform)
- Tracks: 2

Construction
- Structure type: Underground
- Accessible: Yes

History
- Opened: December 30, 2012; 13 years ago

Services
Preceding station	Beijing Subway	Following station
Shilipu towards Jin'anqiao	Line 6	Dalianpo towards Luyang
Shilipu towards Jin'anqiao	Line 6 Express	Haojia Fu towards Luyang
Location
- Location within Beijing

Qingnian Lu (Chinese: 青年路站; pinyin: Qīngnián Lù Zhàn) is a station on Line 6 of the Beijing Subway. This station opened on December 30, 2012.

== Station layout ==
The station has an underground island platform.

== Exits ==
There are 3 exits, lettered B, C, and D. Exit C is accessible.
