= Changying station =

Beijing Subway station

Coordinates: 39.925696°N 116.599722°E

Changying 常营
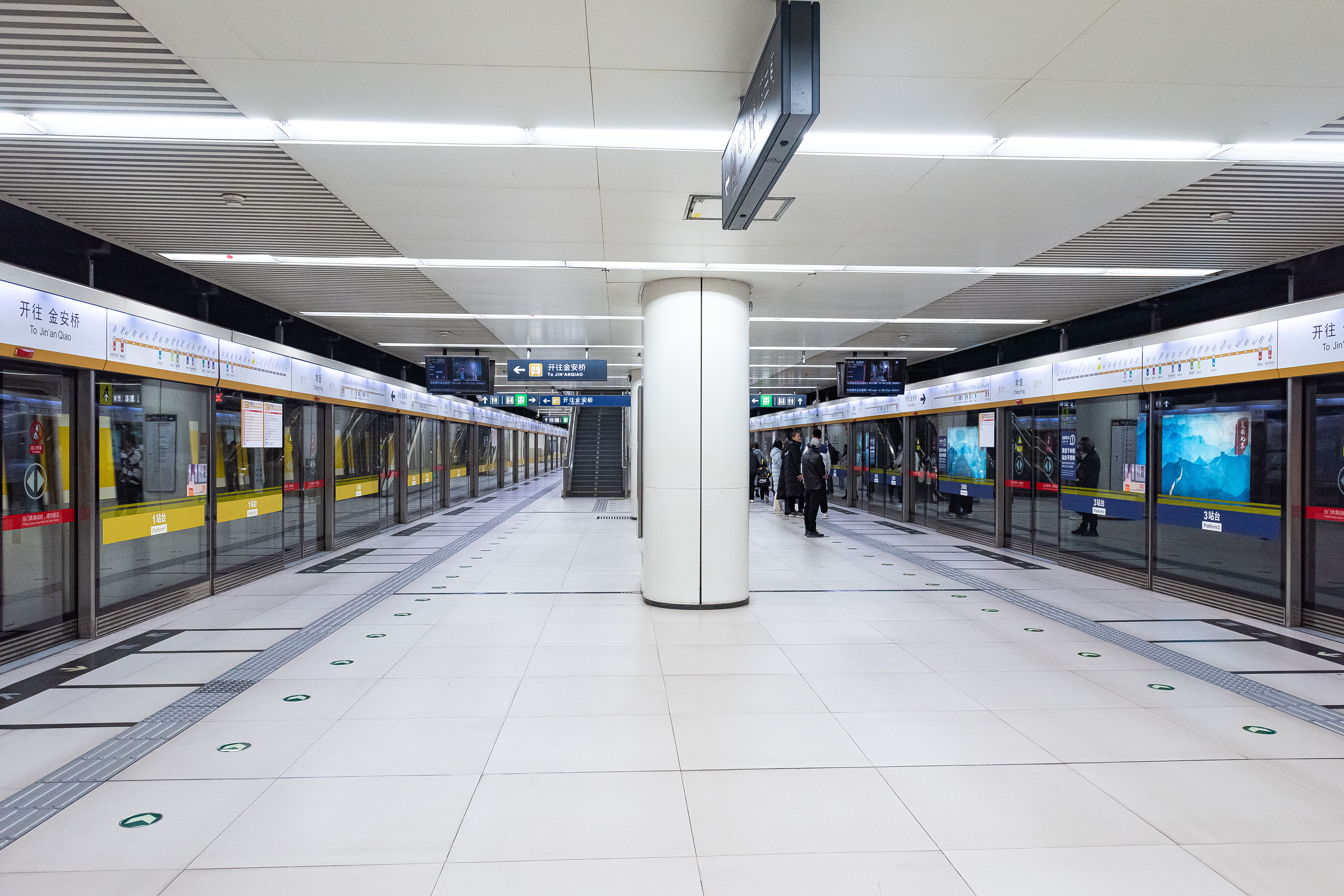
- Westbound platform

General information
- Location: Changtong Road (常通路) and North Chaoyang Road (朝阳北路); Changying, Chaoyang District, Beijing; China
- Operator: Beijing Mass Transit Railway Operation Corporation Limited
- Line: Line 6
- Platforms: 4 (2 island platforms)
- Tracks: 4

Construction
- Structure type: Underground
- Accessible: Yes

History
- Opened: December 30, 2012; 13 years ago

Services
Preceding station	Beijing Subway	Following station
Huangqu towards Jin'anqiao	Line 6	Caofang towards Luyang
Location
- Location within Beijing

Changying (simplified Chinese: 常营站; traditional Chinese: 常營站; pinyin: Chángyíng Zhàn) is a station on Line 6 of the Beijing Subway. This station opened on December 30, 2012.

== Station layout ==
The station has underground dual-island platforms.

== Exits ==
There are 4 exits, lettered B, C, E, and F. Exits B, E and F are accessible.

== Gallery ==
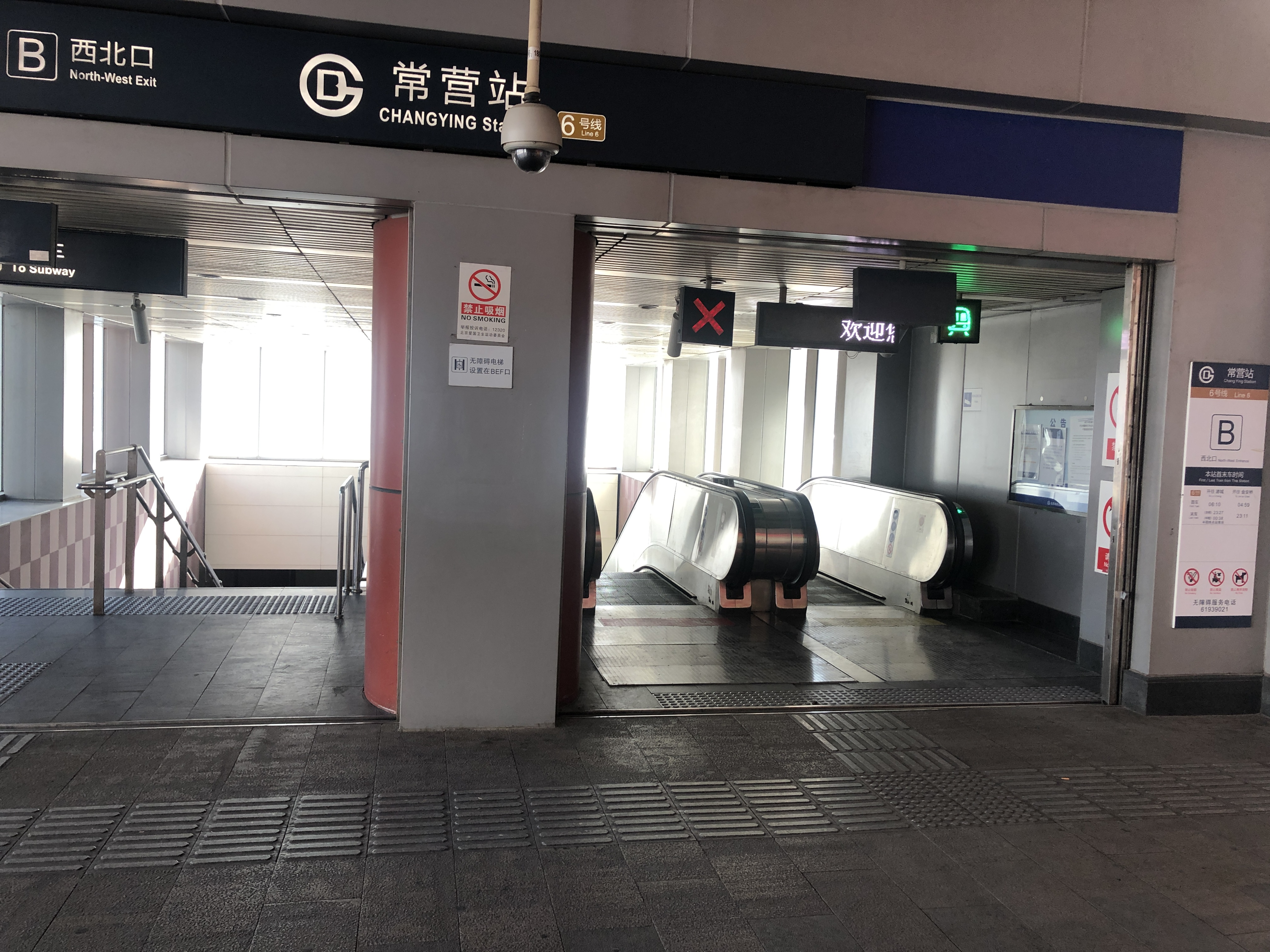
Exit B up close

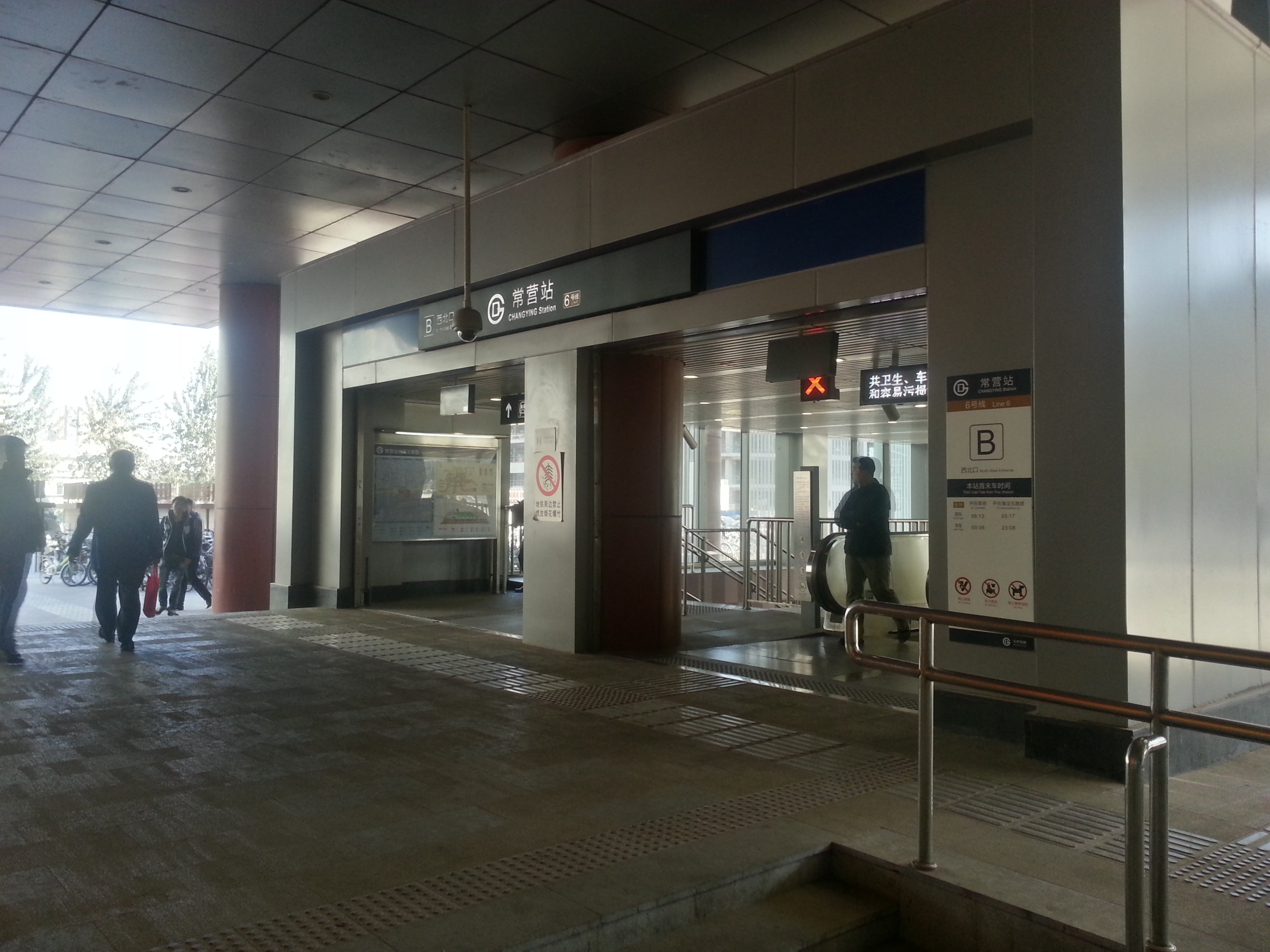
Exit B

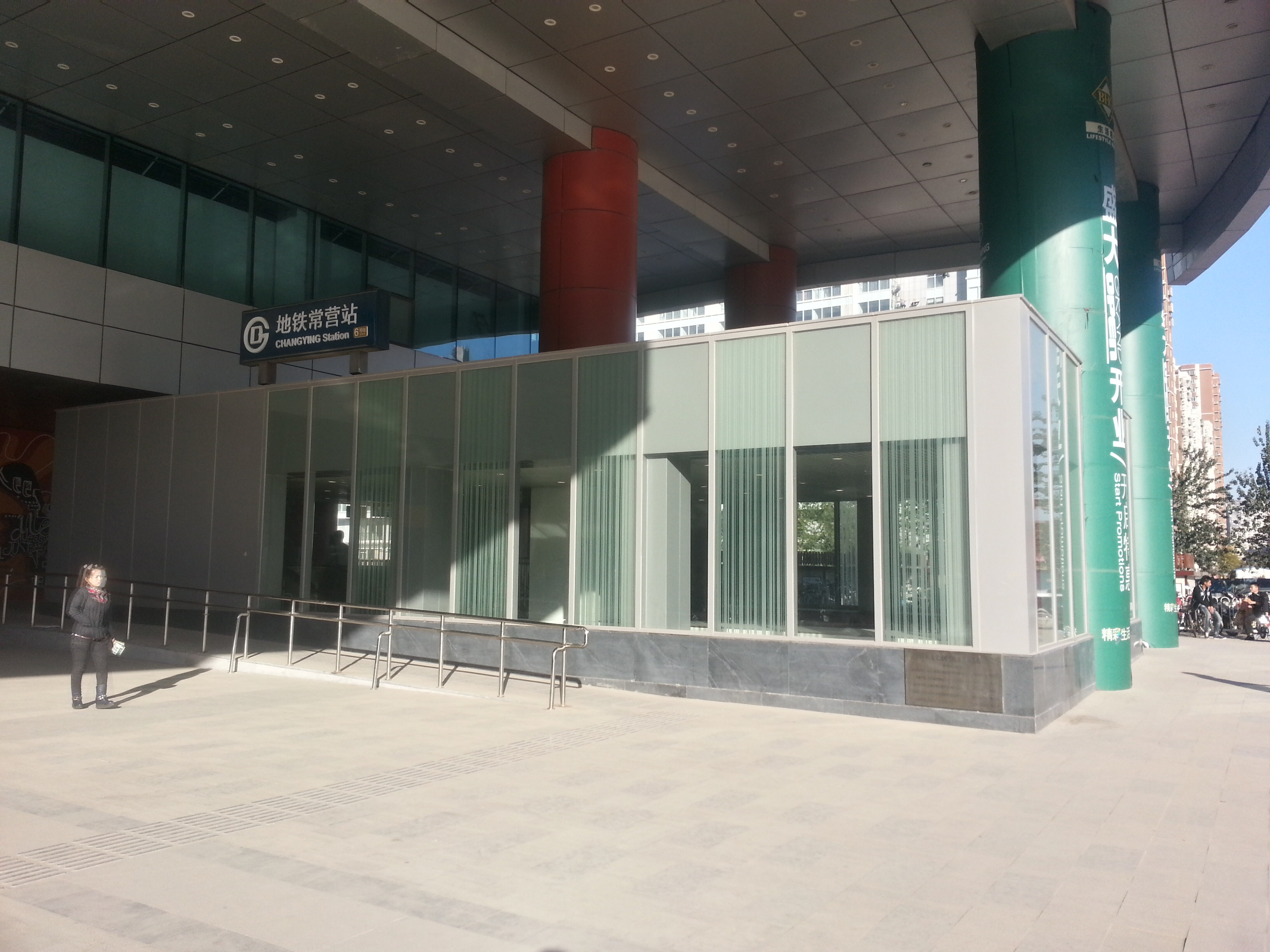
Exit B structure

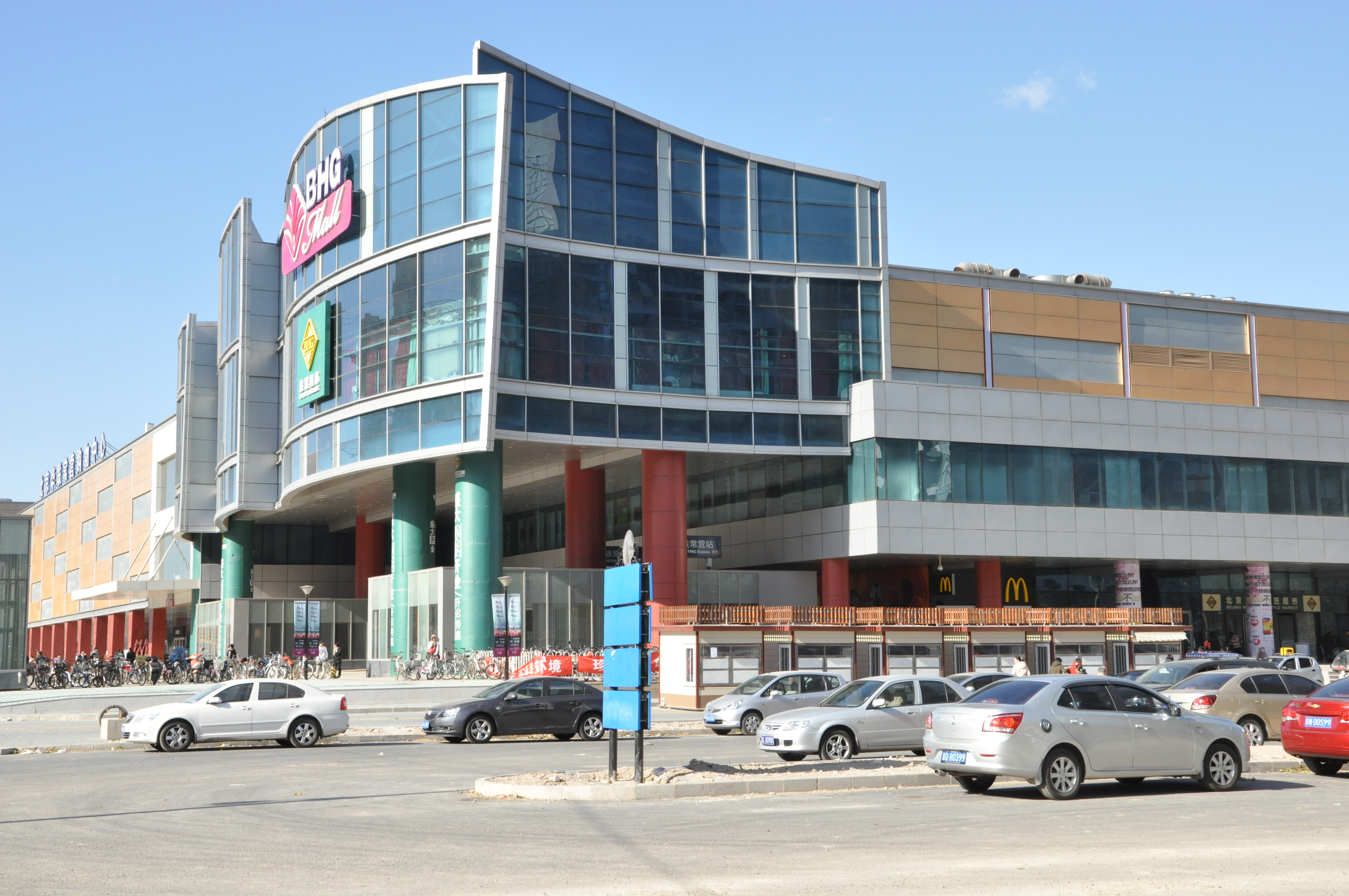
Exit B is embedded in a commercial building.

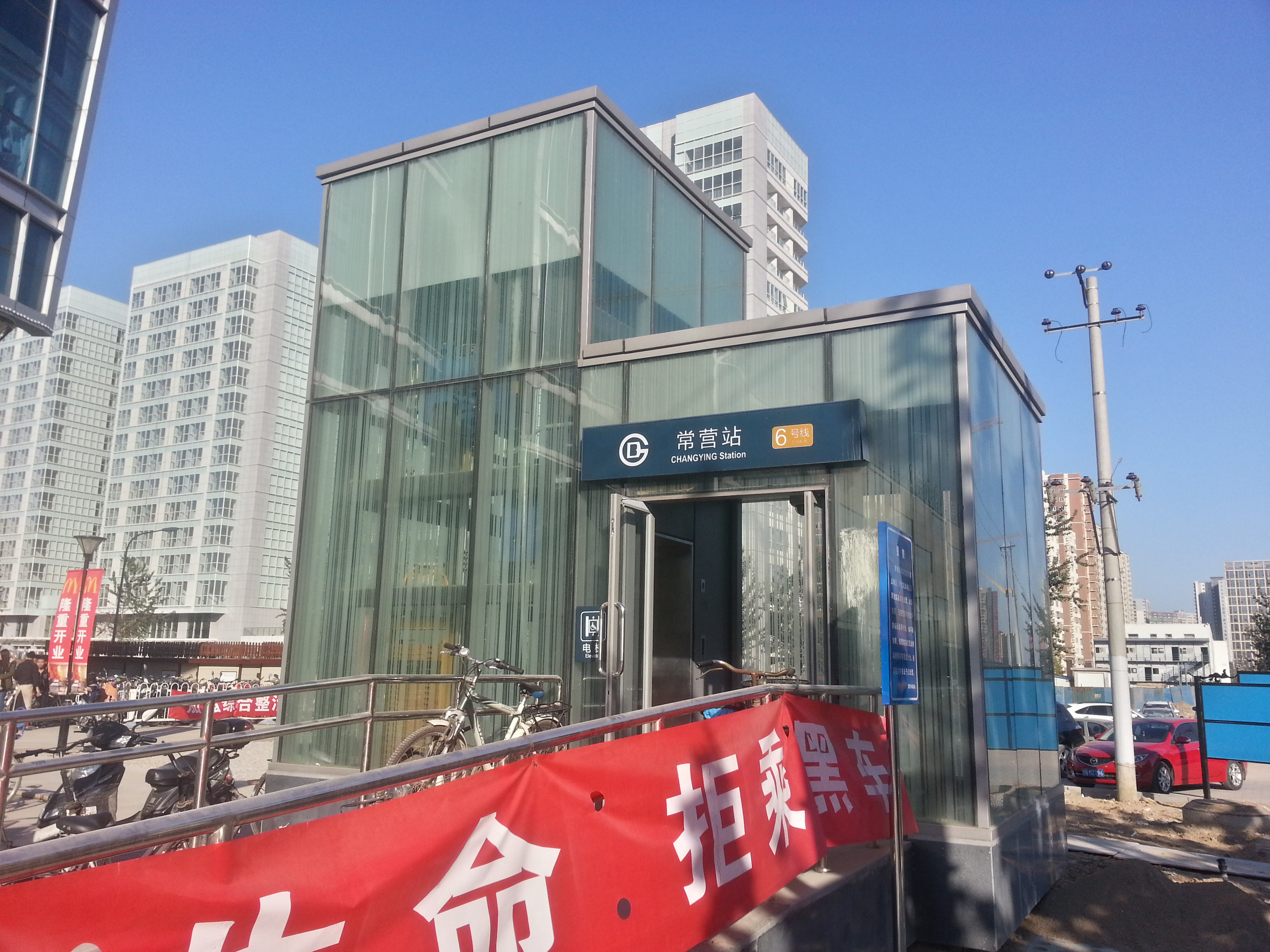
Elevator serving exit B

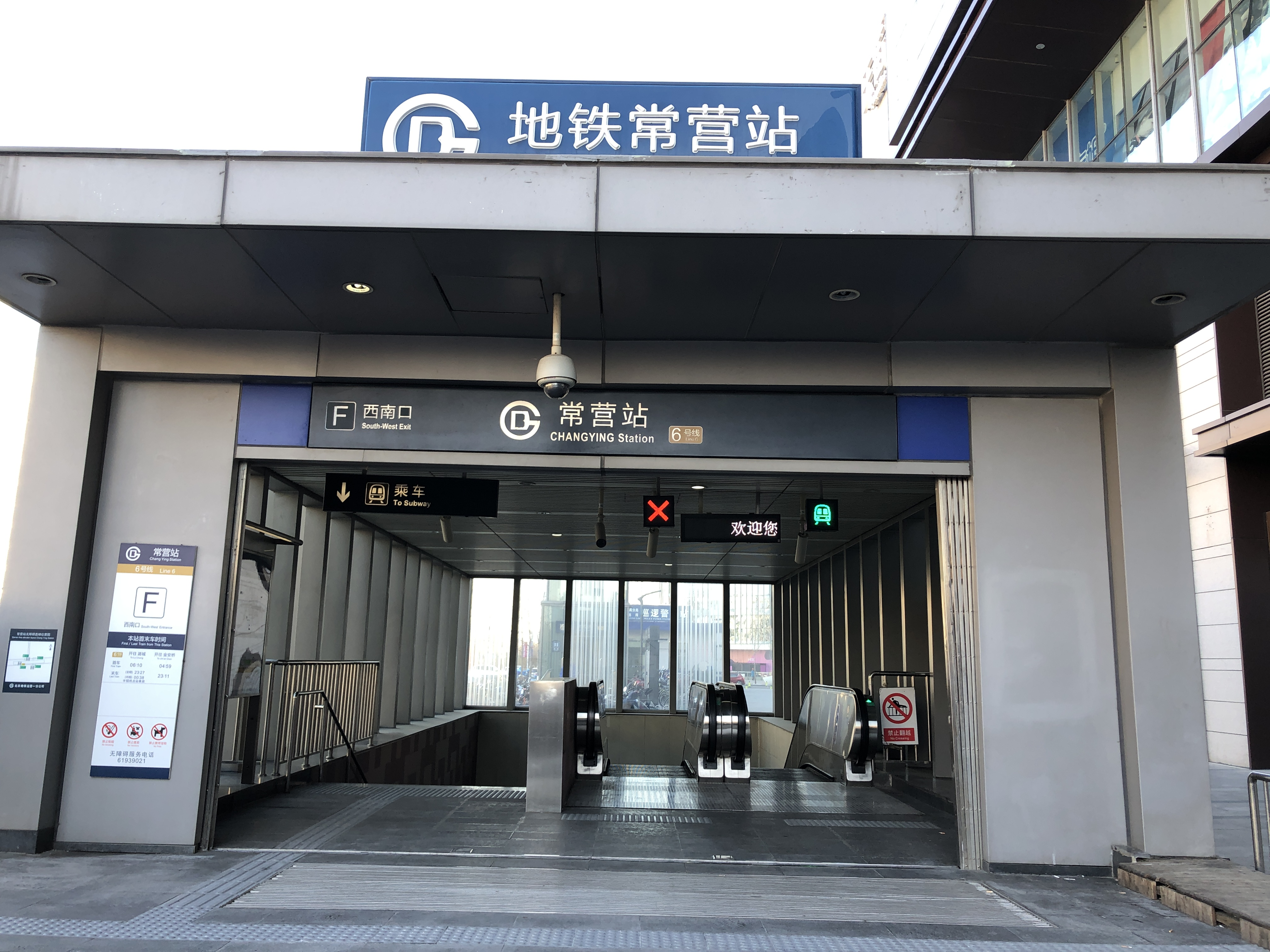
Exit F

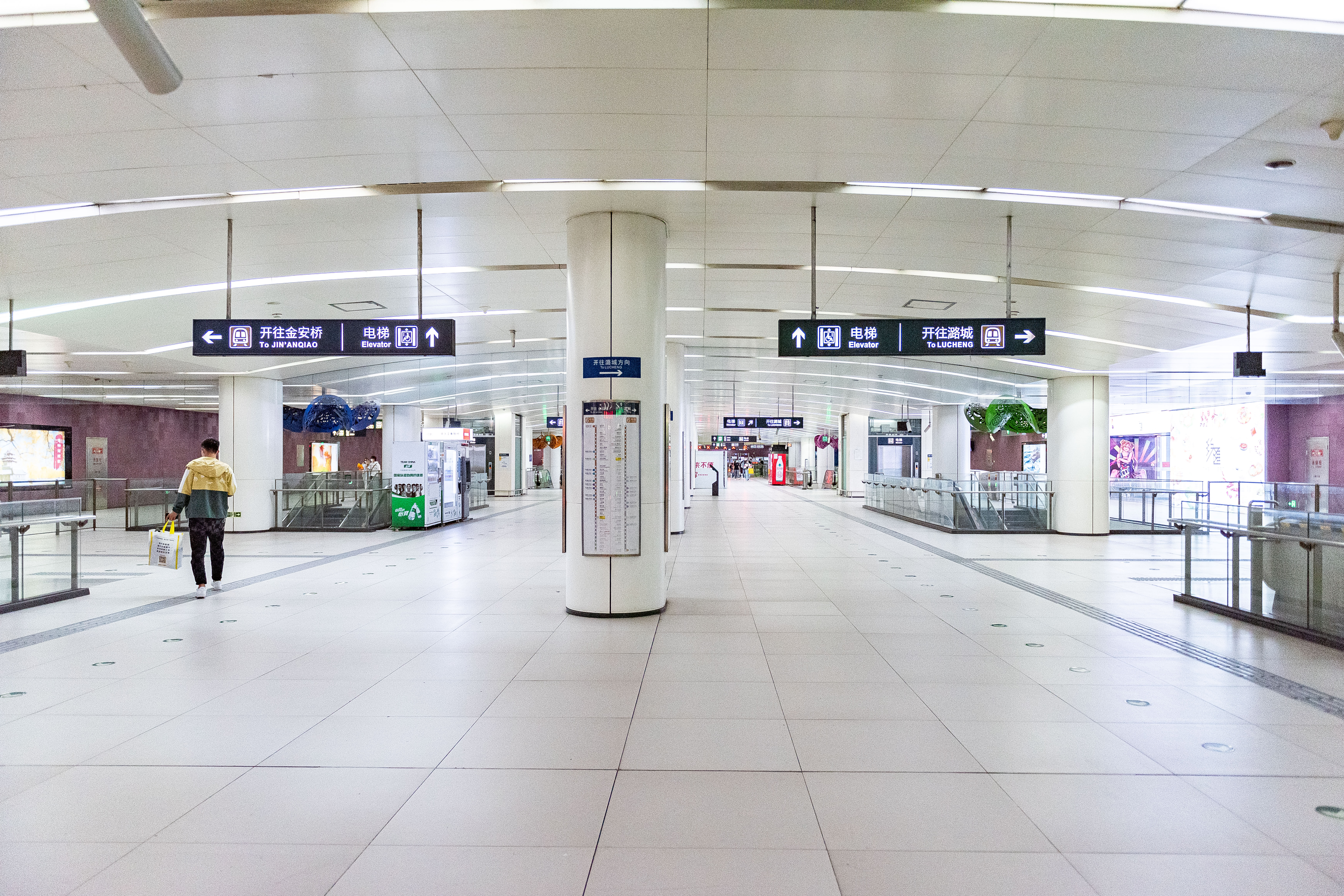
Concourse

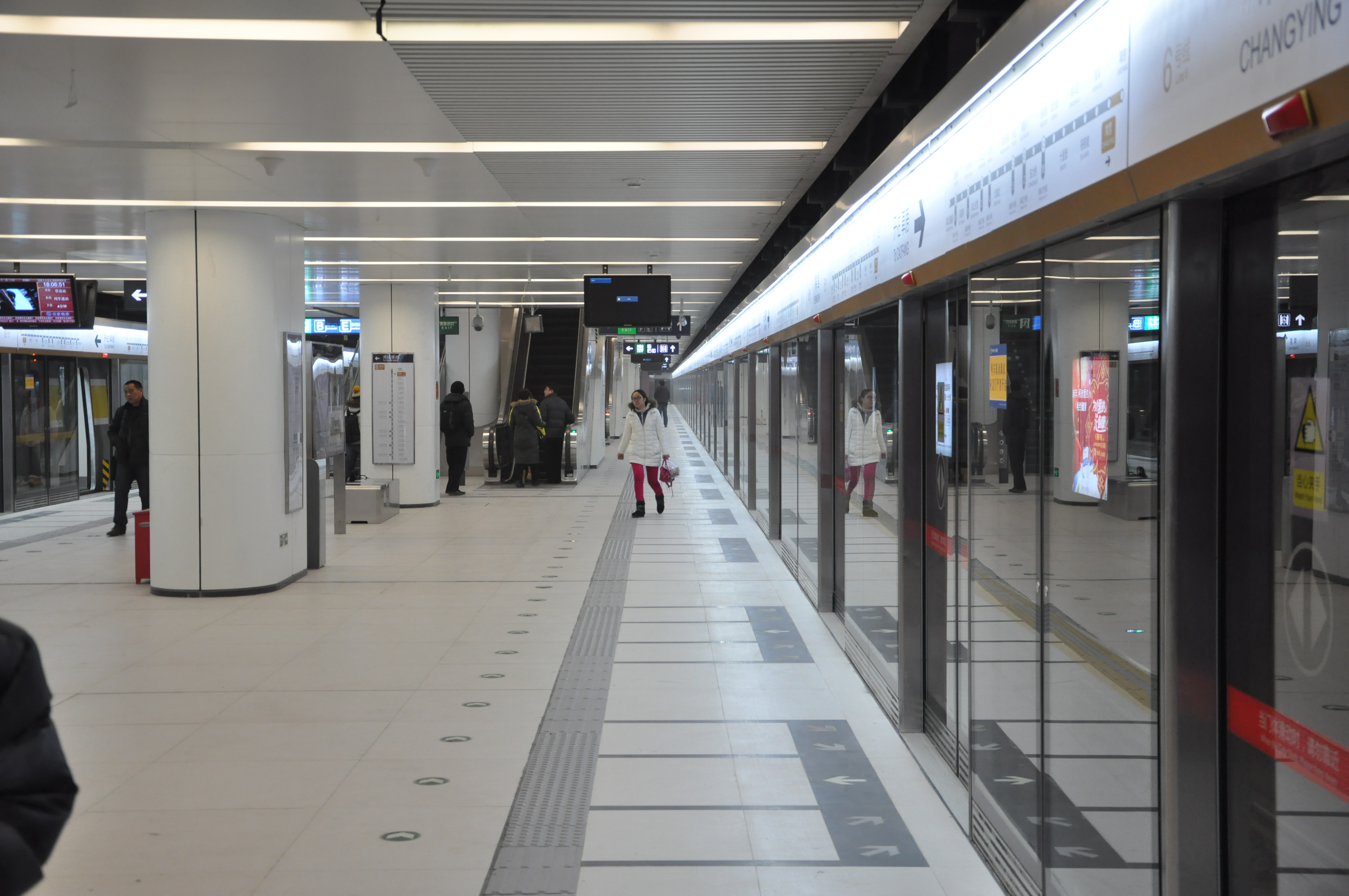
Eastbound Platform

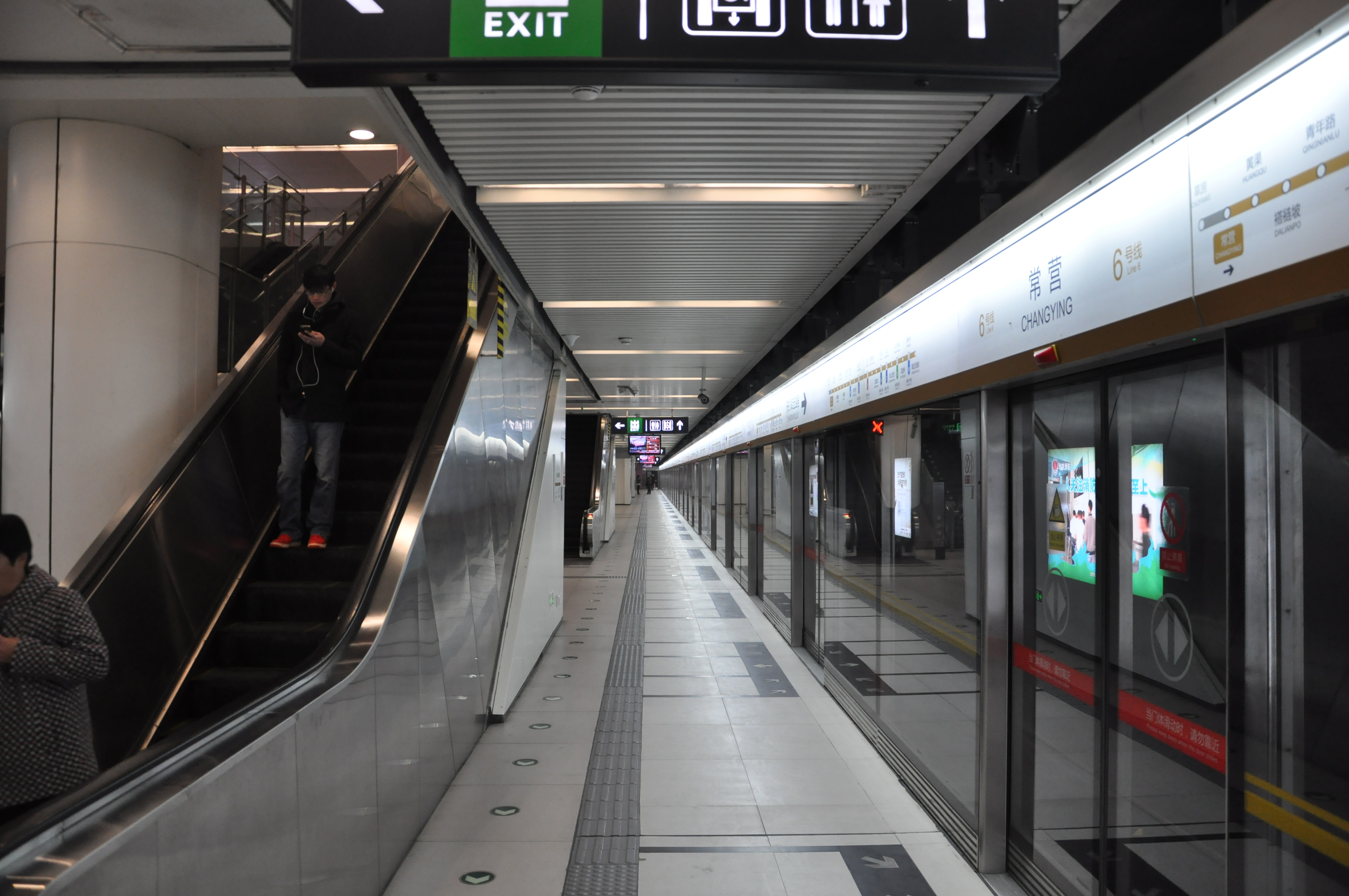
Platform with escalator to the left

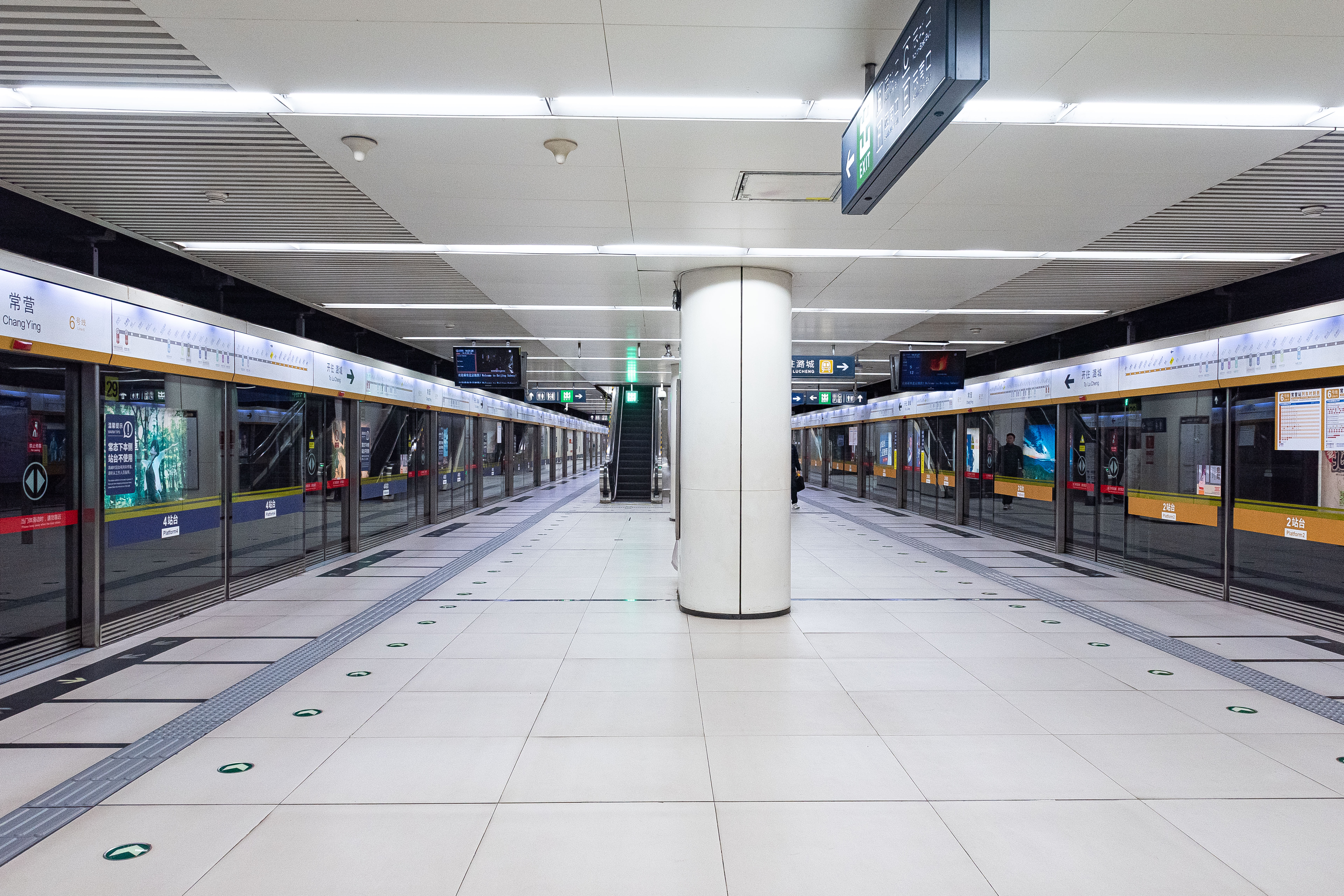
Eastbound Platform

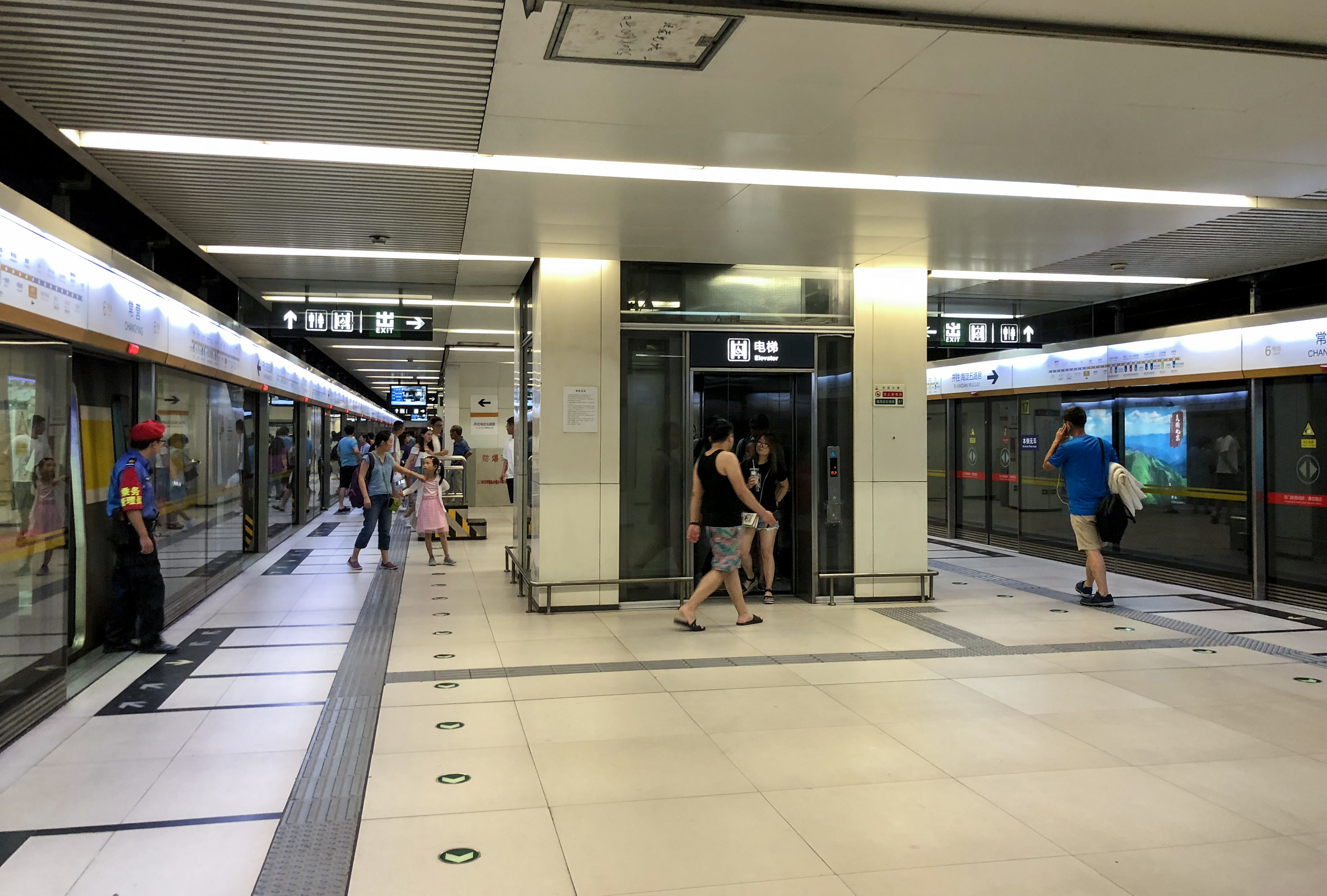
Westbound platform

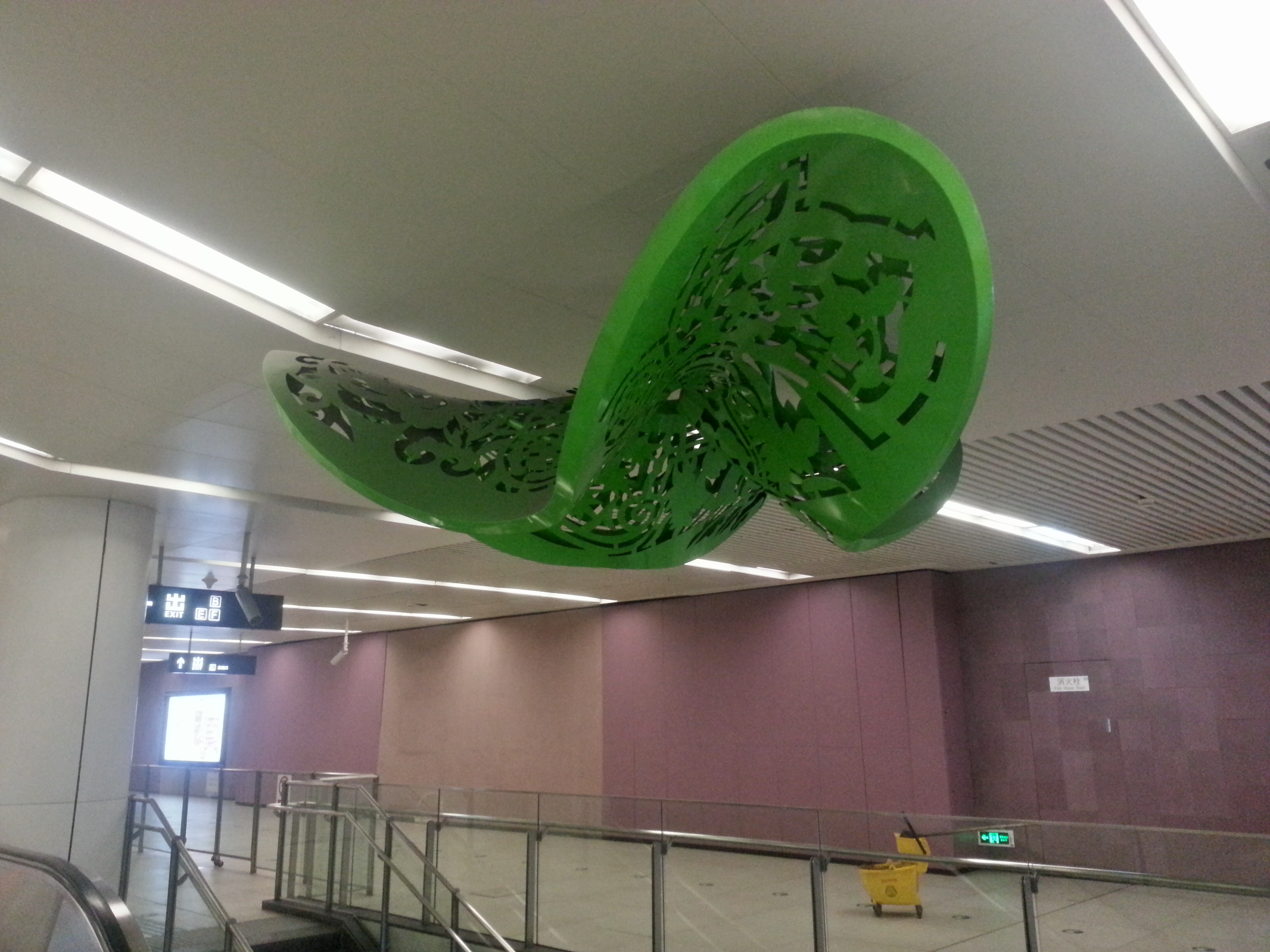
Station art
