= Hongmiao station =

Future Beijing subway station

Hongmiao 红庙
- Construction site in November 2026

General information
- Location: Intersection of Jintai Road and Chaoyang Road; Chaoyang District, Beijing; China
- Coordinates: 39°54′53″N 116°28′20″E
- Operator: Beijing MTR Corporation Limited
- Lines: Line 14 (not opened); Line 22 (opening 2026)
- Platforms: 4 (1 island platform and 2 side platforms)
- Tracks: 4

Construction
- Structure type: Underground
- Accessible: Yes

History
- Opened: Late-2026

Services
Preceding station	Beijing Subway	Following station
Future services (2026)
Dawang Lu towards Zhangguozhuang	Line 14	Jintai Lu towards Shangezhuang
Jintai Xizhao towards Dongdaqiao	Line 22	Ciyunsi Qiao towards Pinggu
Location
- Location within Beijing

Hongmiao station (Chinese: 红庙站; pinyin: Hóngmiào zhàn) is a station under construction on Line 14 and Pinggu line (Line 22) of the Beijing Subway. It is expected to open in late 2026.

== Description ==
Hongmiao station will be an interchange station between Line 14 and Pinggu line (Line 22). It will open in late 2026. There will be 2 exits for Line 14.

== Station layout ==
This station will have side platforms for Line 14 and an island platform for Pinggu line.
