= Pinggu (disambiguation) =

Pinggu is a district of Beijing, China.

Pinggu may also refer to:

- Pinggu Town, or Yuyang Area, within Pinggu District, Beijing
- Pinggu station, an under construction station of Line 22, Beijing Subway
