= Line 28 =

Line 28 may refer to:

- Line 28 (Beijing Subway), an under construction railway line in Beijing, China, formerly known as the CBD Line.
- Line 28 (Guangzhou Metro), an under construction railway line in Guangzhou, China
- Line 28 (IndyGo), a route operated by the public transit operator in Indianapolis, Indiana, U.S.
