= Tongzhou Beiguan station =

Beijing Subway station

Tongzhou Beiguan 通州北关
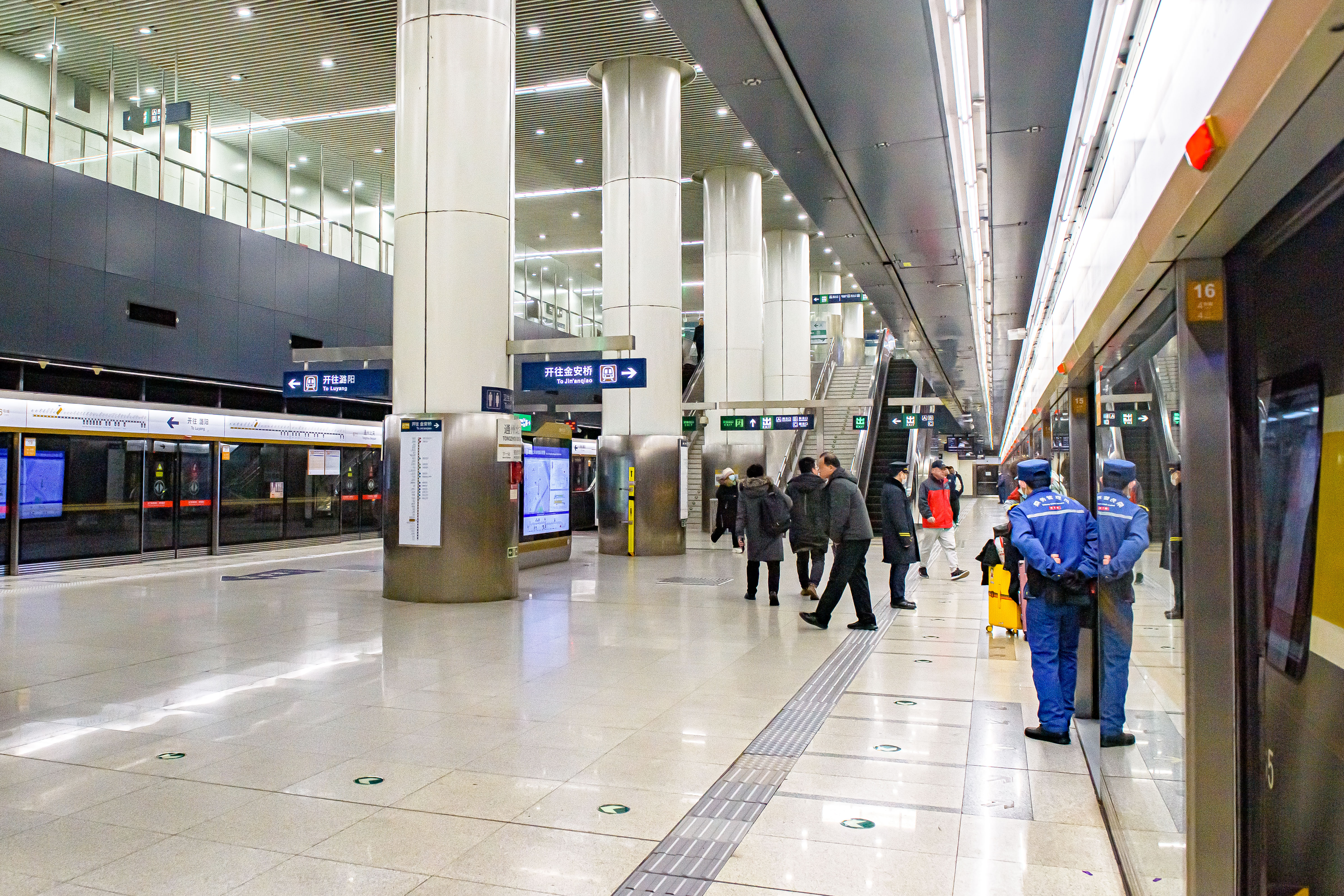
- Platform

General information
- Location: Yantan Road (盐滩路) & Guanyin'an Street (观音庵街); Canal Business District, Xinhua Subdistrict, Tongzhou District, Beijing; China
- Coordinates: 39.917374°N 116.655515°E
- Operator: Beijing Mass Transit Railway Operation Corporation Limited
- Lines: Line 6; Line 22 (opening 2026)
- Platforms: 2 (1 island platform)
- Tracks: 2

Construction
- Structure type: Underground
- Accessible: Yes

History
- Opened: December 28, 2014; 11 years ago (Line 6); December 2026 (Line 22)

Services
| Preceding station | Beijing Subway | Following station |
|---|---|---|
| Wuzi Xueyuan Lu towards Jin'anqiao | Line 6 | Tongyun Men towards Luyang |
Location
- Location within Beijing

Tongzhou Beiguan station (Chinese: 通州北关站; pinyin: Tōngzhōu Běiguān zhàn) is a station on Line 6 of the Beijing Subway. The station opened on December 28, 2014.

This station is located in Canal Business District, Xinhua Subdistrict, Tongzhou District, Beijing.

== Name ==
Tongzhou Beiguan station will be renamed to Yunhe Shangwuqu station (Chinese: 运河商务区站; pinyin: Yùnhé Shāngwùqū zhàn; lit. 'Canal Business District station') in December 2026, as the interchange station between Lines 6 and 22. On 11 November 2026, the rename plan was officially approved by Beijing Municipal Commission of Planning and Natural Resources.

== Station layout ==
The station has an underground island platform.

== Exits ==
There are 3 exits in operation, lettered A, B and C. Exit A is accessible.
