= Guomao station (Beijing Subway) =

Beijing Subway interchange station

Coordinates: 39°54′33″N 116°27′43″E

Guomao 国贸
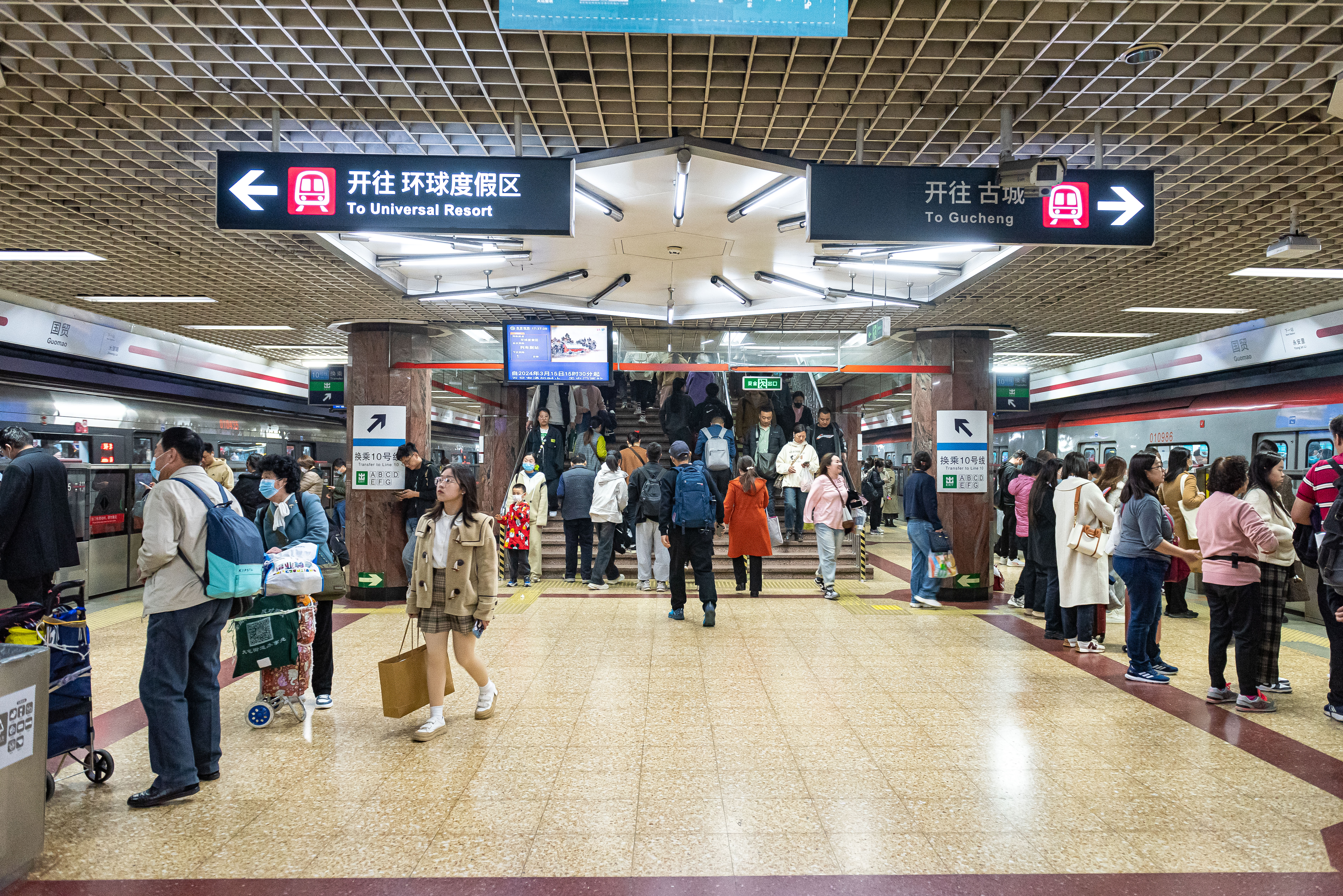
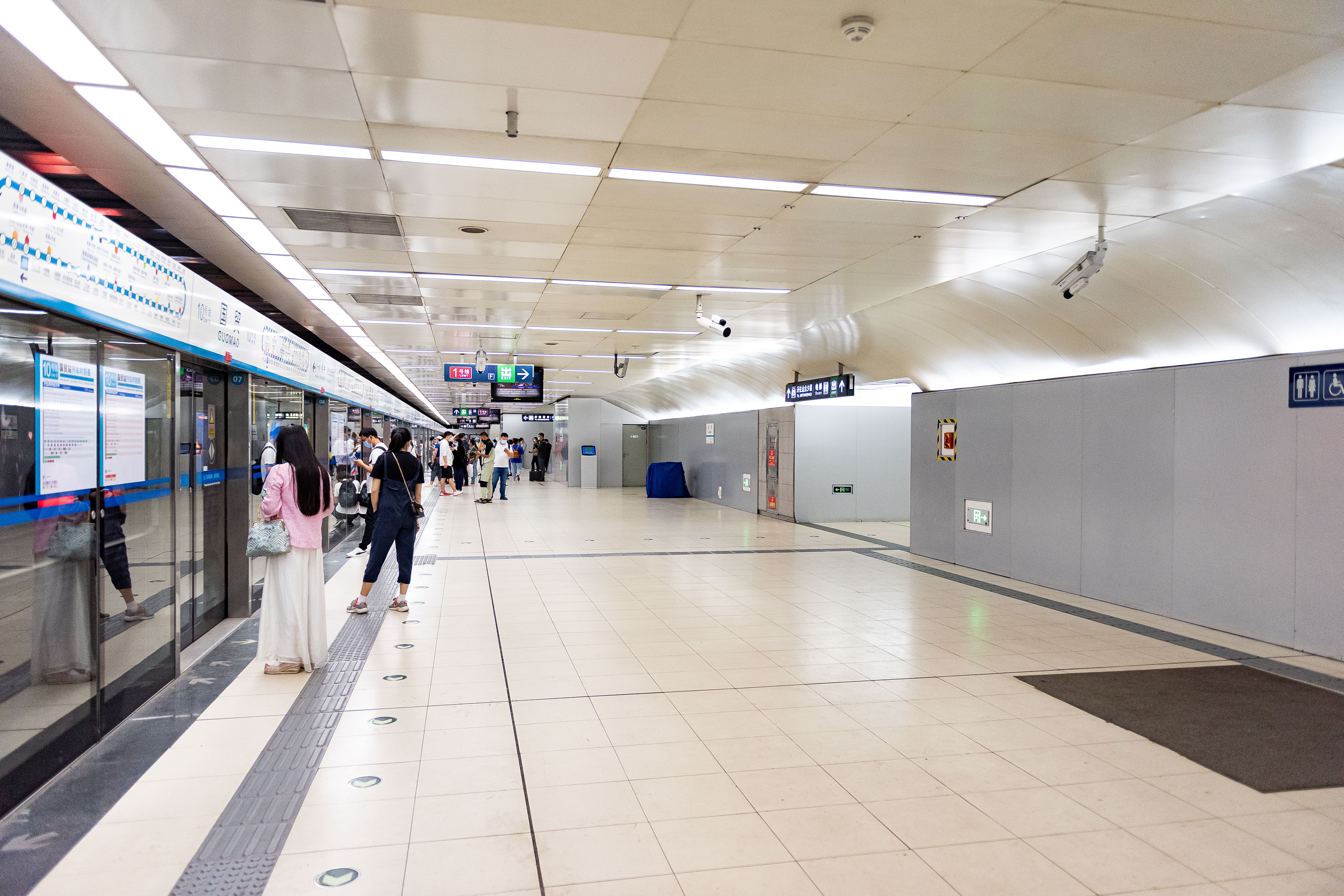
- Line 1 platform Line 10 clockwise platform

General information
- Location: Guomao Overpass; Jianwai Subdistrict, Chaoyang District, Beijing; China
- Operator: Beijing Mass Transit Railway Operation Corporation Limited
- Lines: Line 1; Line 10
- Platforms: 4 (1 split island platform and 1 island platform)
- Tracks: 4

Construction
- Structure type: Underground
- Accessible: Yes

Other information
- Station code: 122 (Line 1)

History
- Opened: September 28, 1999; 26 years ago (Line 1); July 19, 2008; 18 years ago (Line 10)
- Former names: Dabeiyao (大北窑, construction name)

Services
Preceding station	Beijing Subway	Following station
Yong'an Li towards Pingguoyuan	Line 1	Dawang Lu towards Universal Resort
Jintai Xizhao outer loop / anticlockwise	Line 10	Shuangjing inner loop / clockwise
Location
- Location within Beijing

Guomao Station (Chinese: 国贸站; pinyin: Guómào Zhàn) is an interchange station on Line 1 and Line 10 of the Beijing Subway at the China World Trade Center. Guomao is the Chinese abbreviation for China World Trade Center. It is located in Chaoyang District. The station handled a peak passenger traffic of 359,800 people on May 5, 2013.

== Station layout ==
Both the line 1 and line 10 stations have underground island platforms. Line 10 has a split island platform, whilst line 1 has a normal island platform. The existing 8.5 meter wide transfer channel connecting the two platforms is insufficient to handle the large interchange volumes between the two busy lines. Daily transfer volumes typically reach 140,000 every weekday, peaking at 32,000 transfers in the AM peak period. During rush hours about 10,000 passengers per hour transfer between the two lines in each direction. The Beijing government is proposing the transfer channel be rebuilt into a large transfer hall to improve passenger circulation.

== Exits ==
There are eight exits, lettered A, B, C, D, E1, E2, F, and G. Exits D, E1, and E2 are accessible.

== Gallery ==
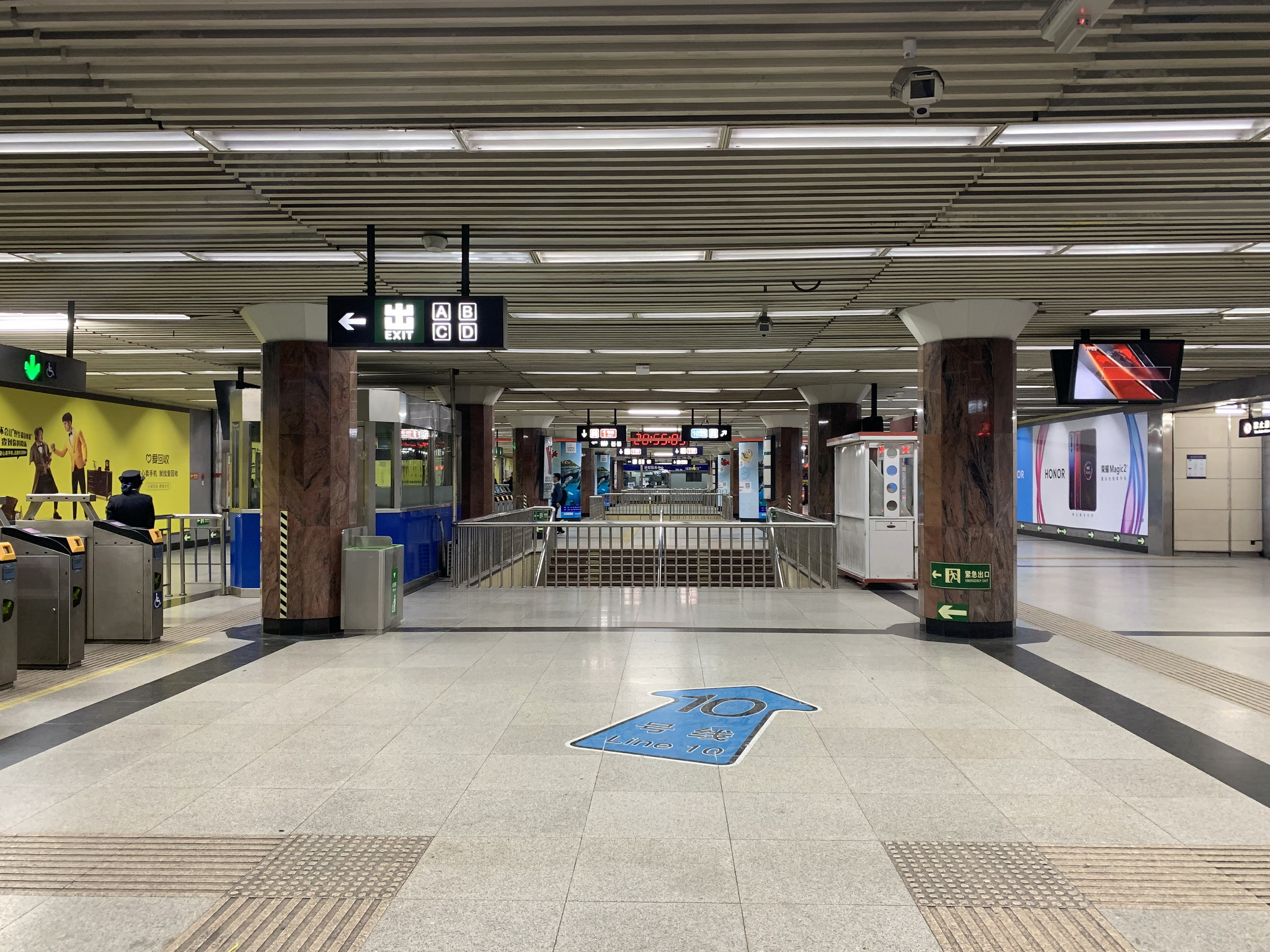
Station Hall of Line 1 (November 2018)

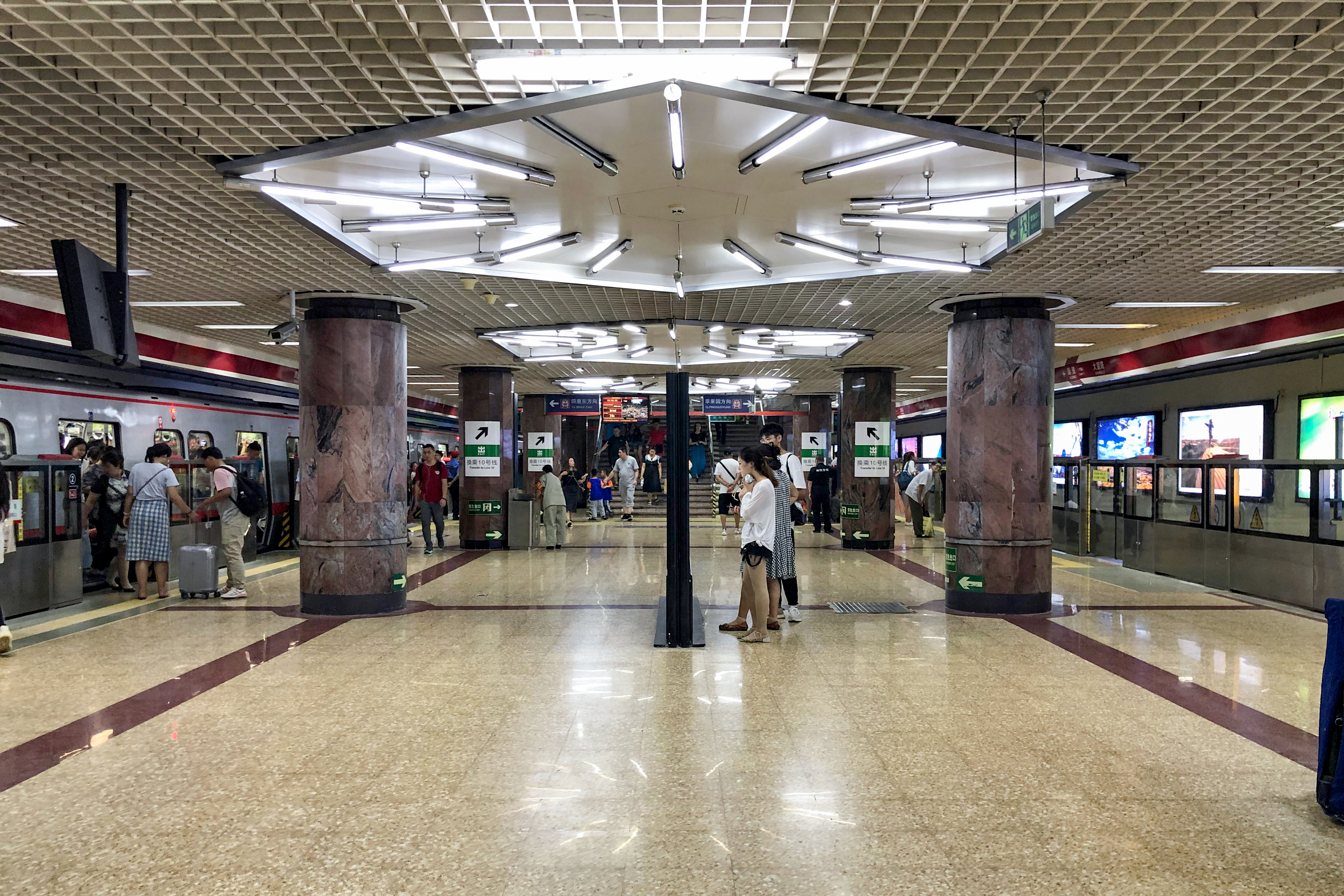
Line 1 platform (July 2019)

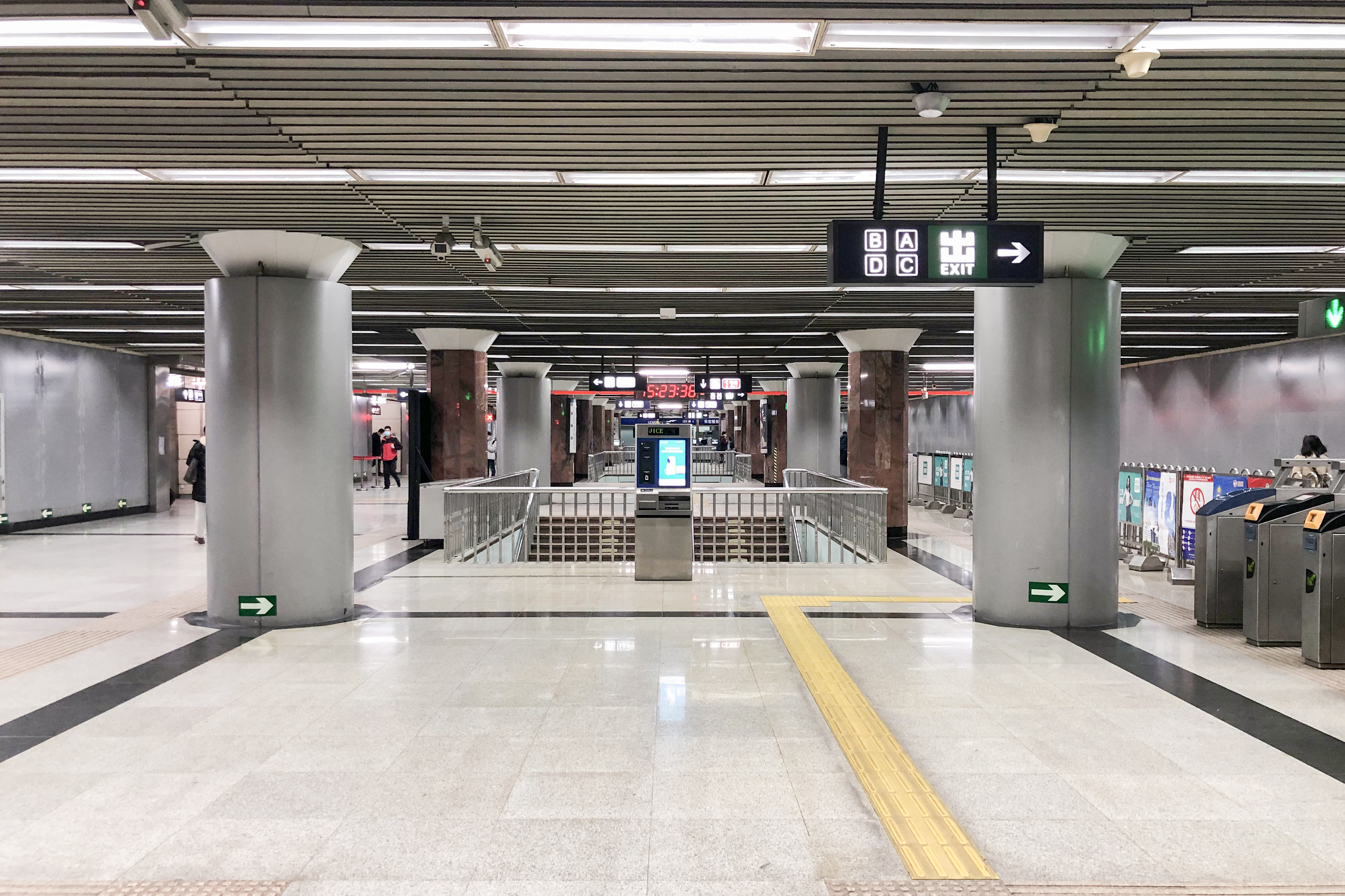
Line 1 concourse (March 2021)

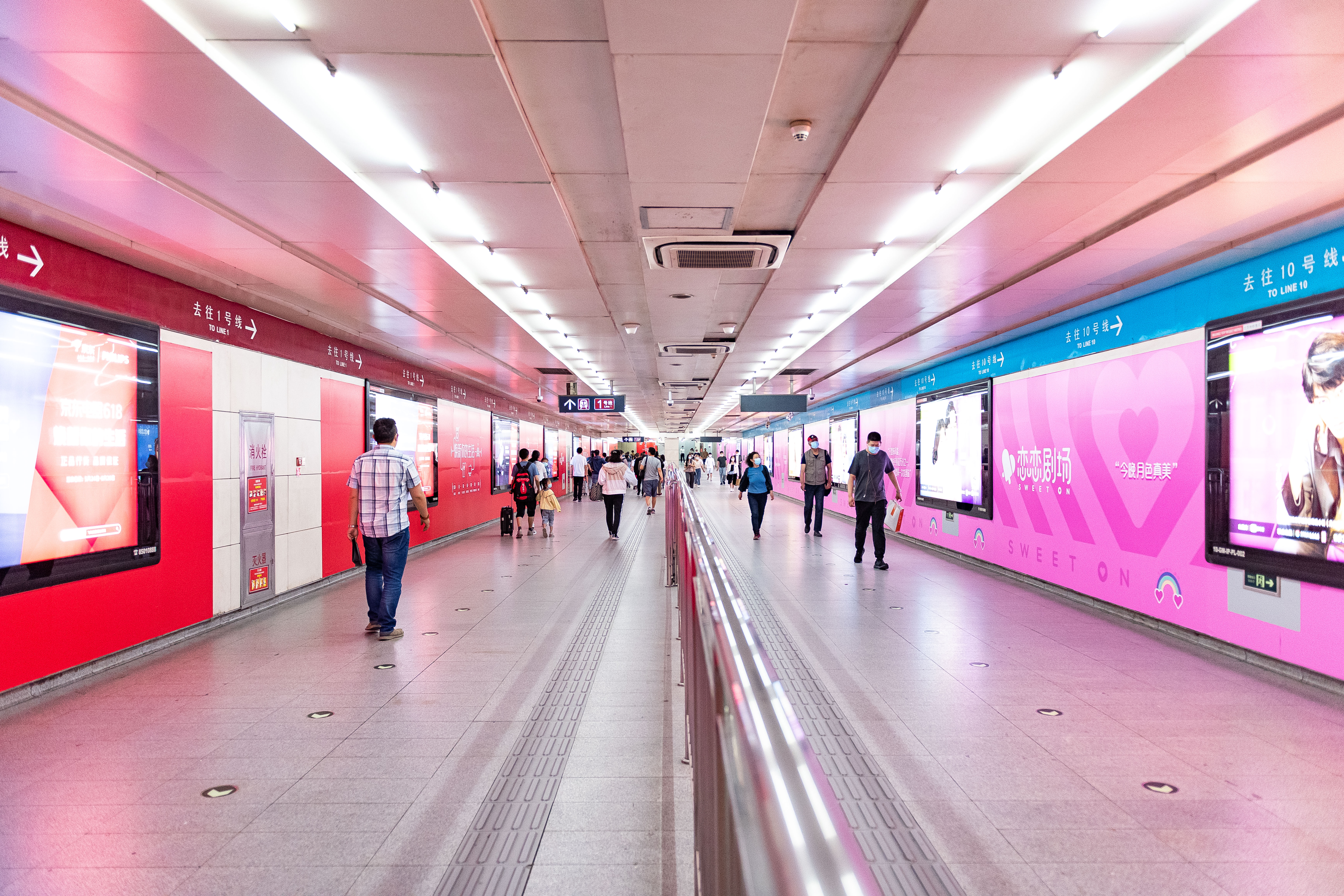
Interchange corridor

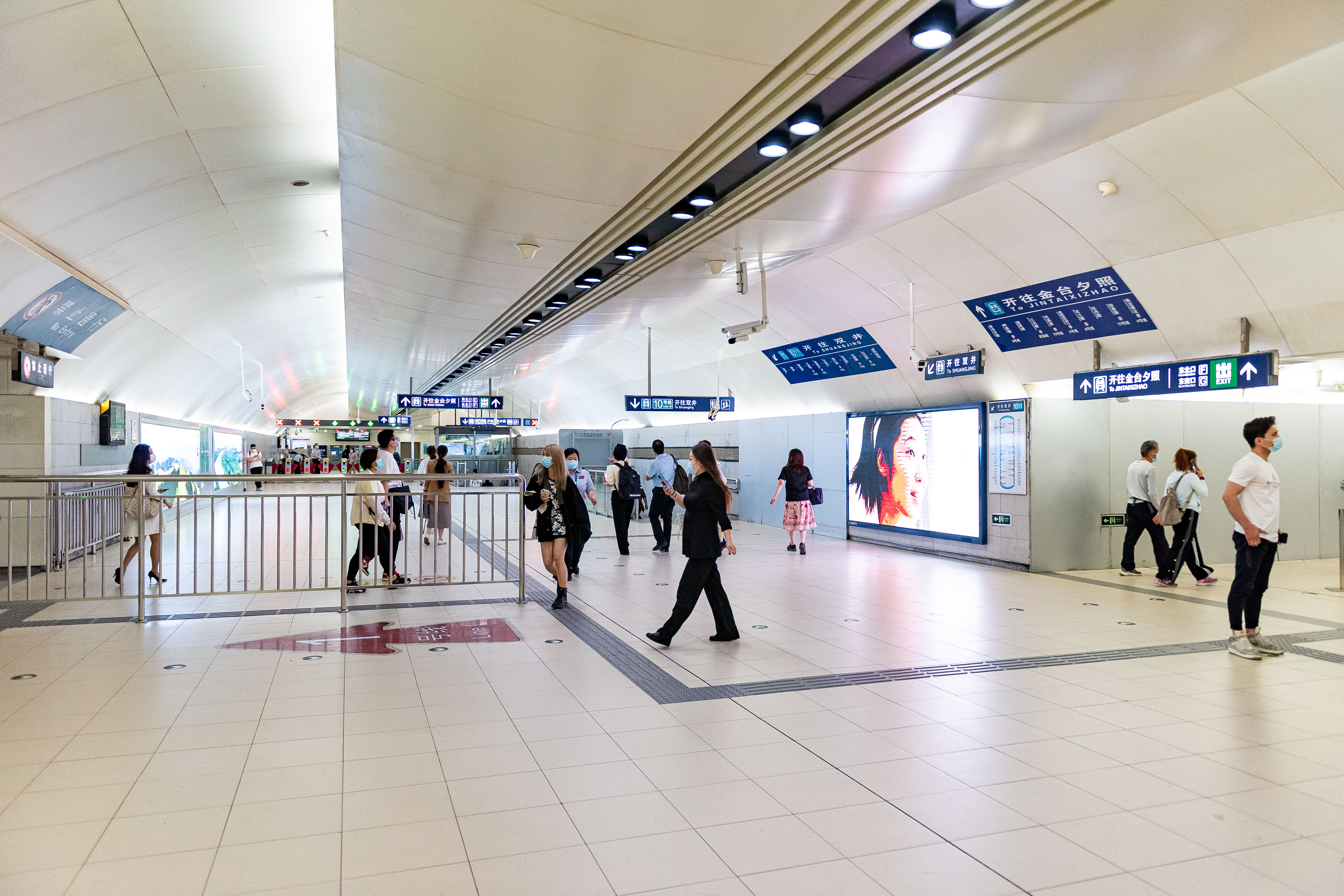
Line 10 west concourse (May 2021)

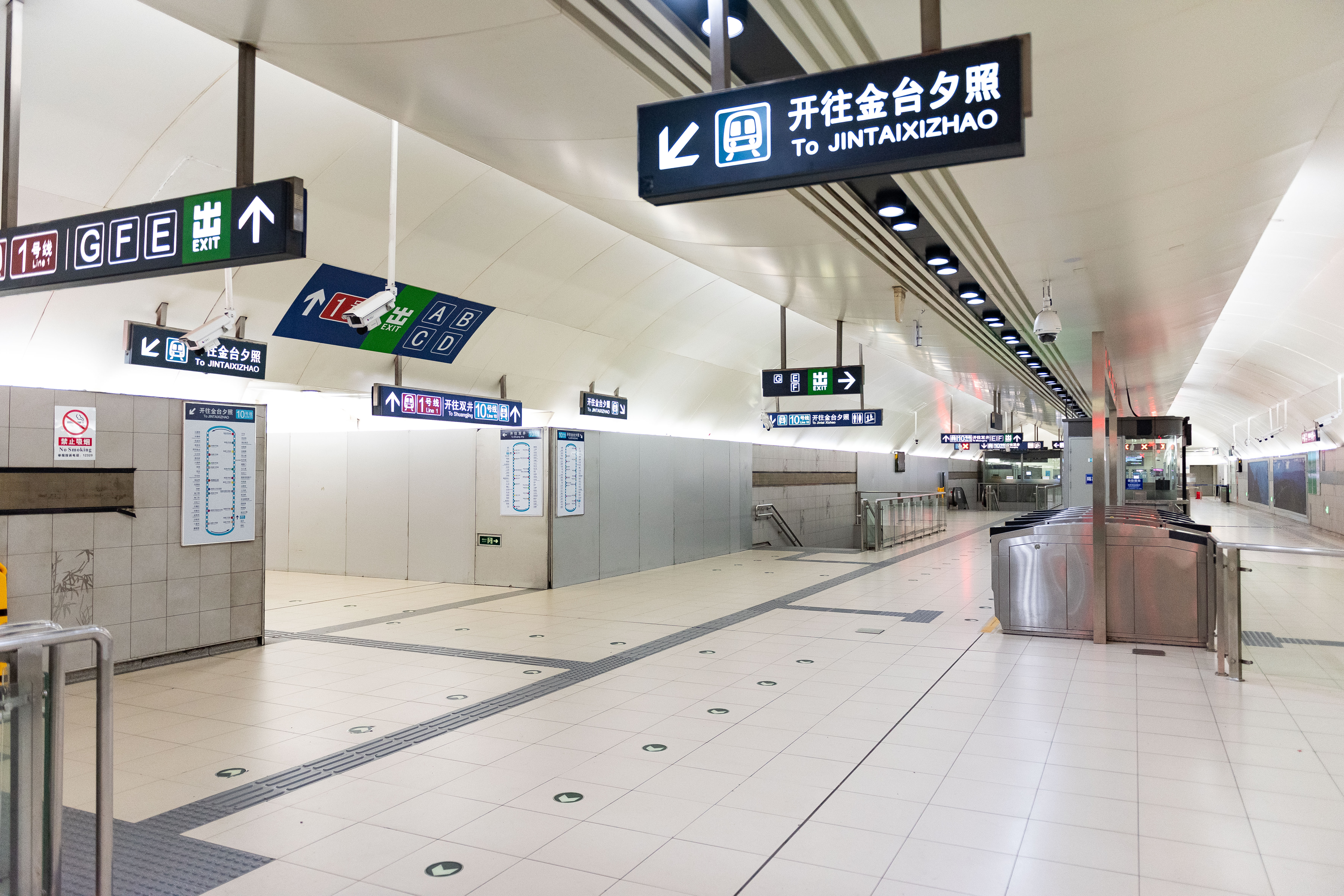
Line 10 east concourse (May 2021)

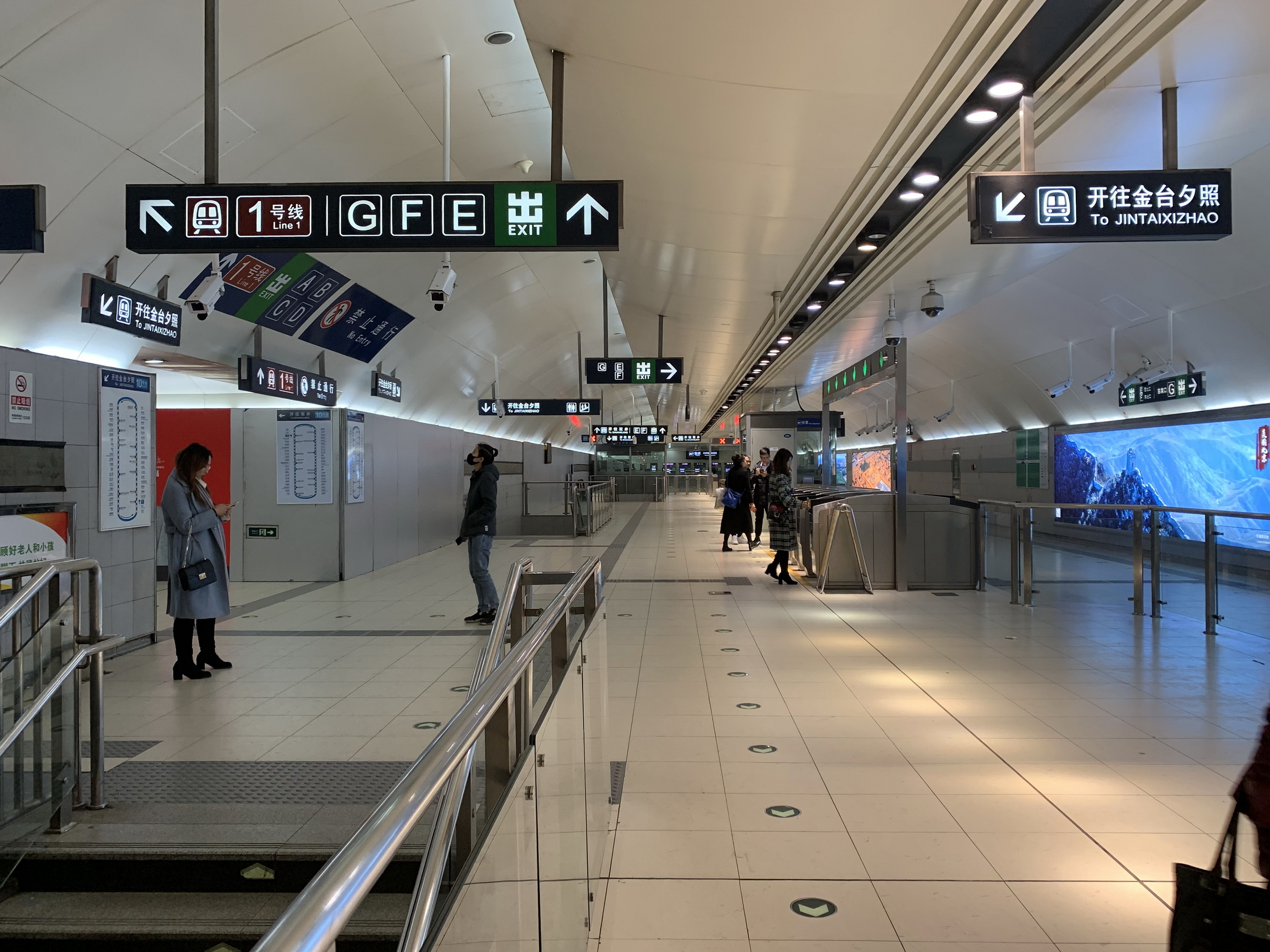
Line 10 concourse (November 2018)

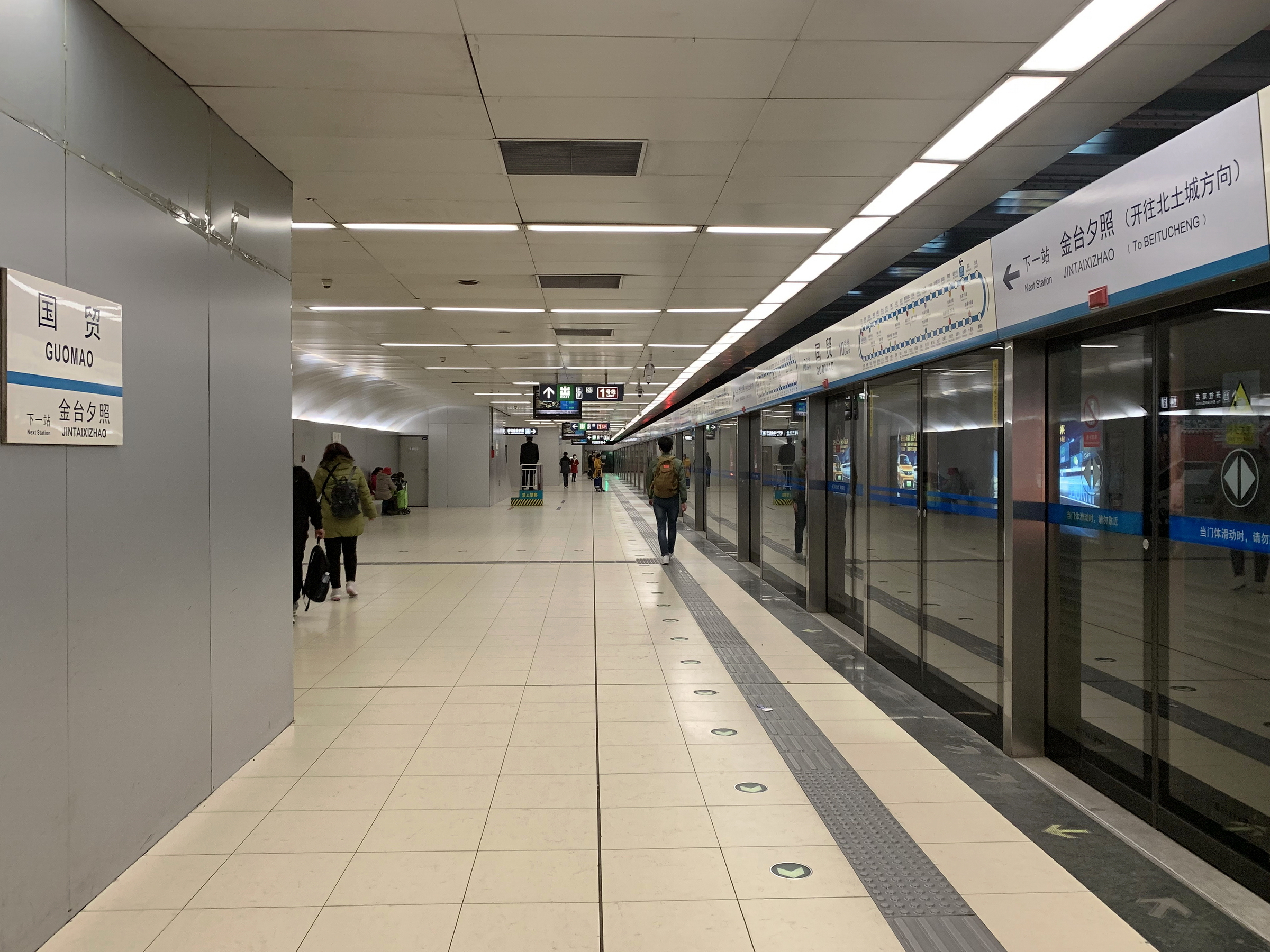
Line 10 platform (November 2018)
