= Wuzi Xueyuan Lu station =

Beijing Subway station

Wuzi Xueyuan Lu 物资学院路
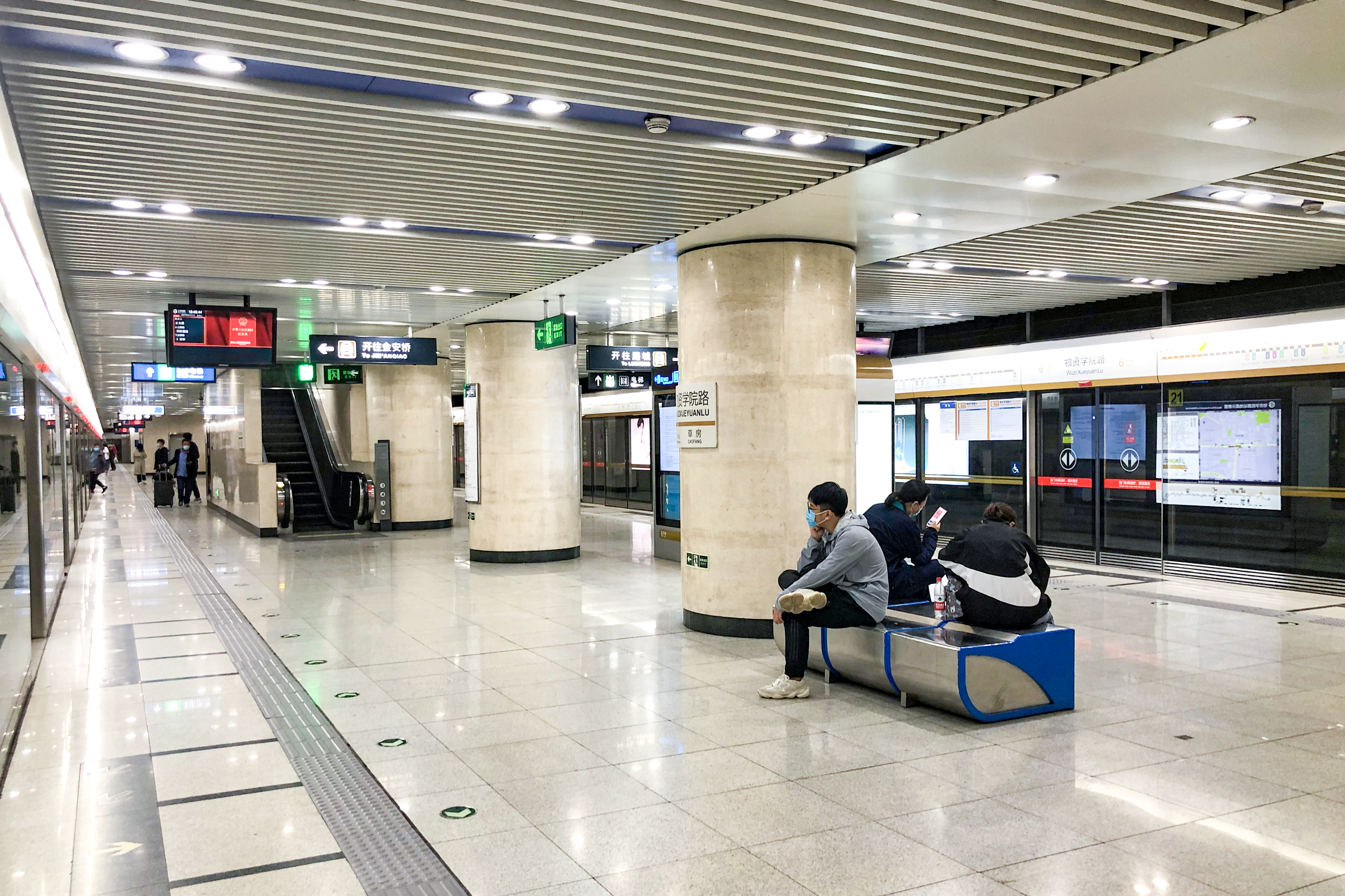
- Platform

General information
- Location: Wuzixueyuan Road (物资学院路) and Fuhe Street (富河大街); Tongzhou District, Beijing; China
- Coordinates: 39.9269°N 116.6393°E
- Operator: Beijing Mass Transit Railway Operation Corporation Limited
- Line: Line 6
- Platforms: 2 (1 island platform)
- Tracks: 2

Construction
- Structure type: Underground
- Accessible: Yes

History
- Opened: December 28, 2014; 11 years ago

Services
| Preceding station | Beijing Subway | Following station |
|---|---|---|
| Caofang towards Jin'anqiao | Line 6 | Tongzhou Beiguan towards Luyang |
Location
- Location within Beijing

Wuzi Xueyuan Lu station (simplified Chinese: 物资学院路站; traditional Chinese: 物資學院路站; pinyin: Wùzī Xuéyuàn Lù Zhàn) is a station on Line 6 of the Beijing Subway. The construction of this station began on September 20, 2012, and was completed in 2014. It is the first station in Tongzhou District when travelling eastbound on Line 6.

== Station layout ==
The station has an underground island platform.

== Exits ==
There are 3 exits, lettered A, B, and D. Exits A and D are accessible.
