= Line 28 (Beijing Subway) =

Proposed railway line in Beijing, China

- 28
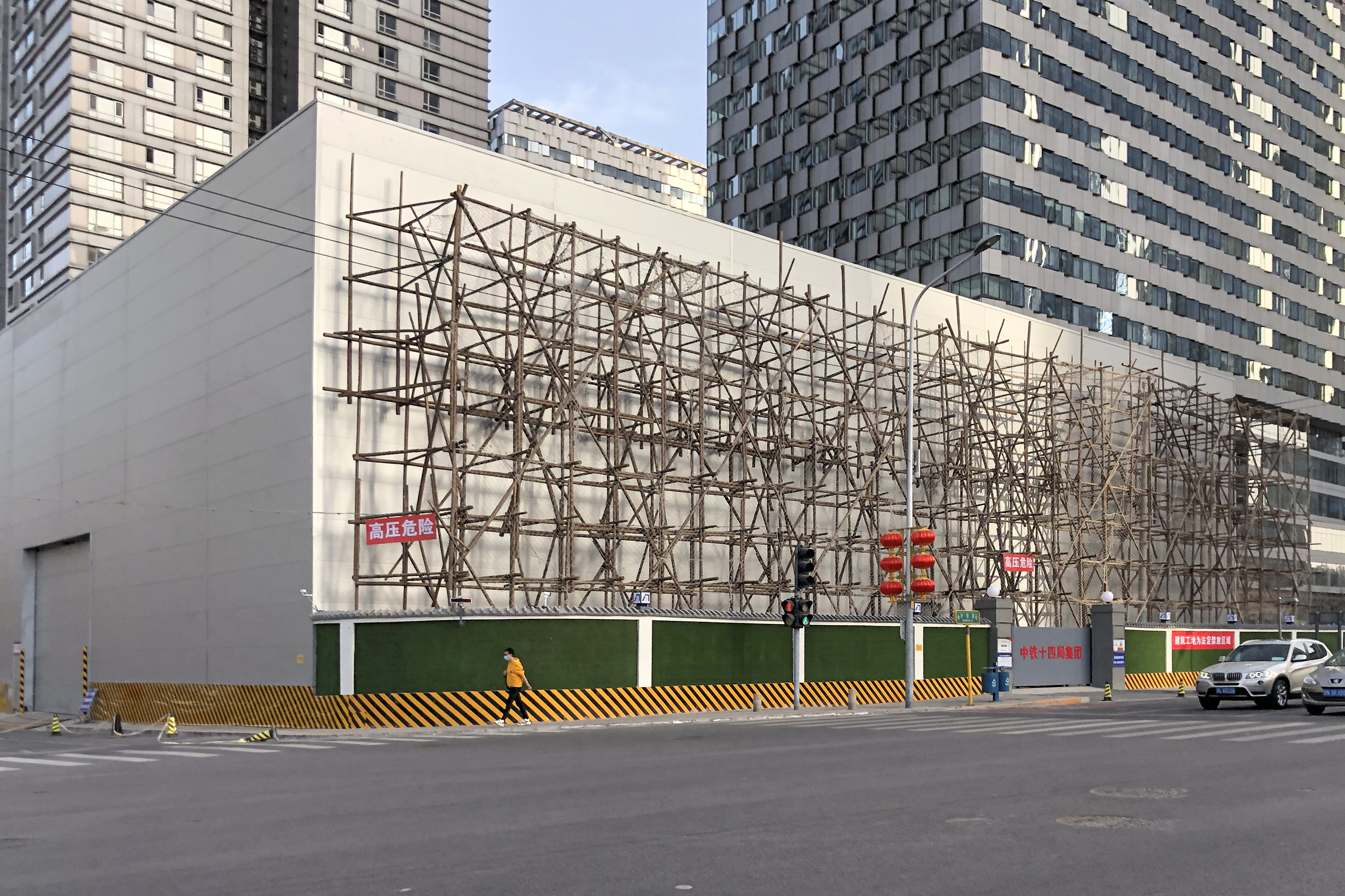
- Construction site in February 2021

Overview
- Other name(s): M28 (planned name); CBD line
- Status: Under construction
- Locale: Chaoyang district Beijing
- Termini: Dongdaqiao; Guangqudonglu
- Stations: 9

Service
- Type: Rapid Transit
- System: Beijing Subway
- Rolling stock: 6-car Type L_{B}

History
- Planned opening: 2029; 4 years' time (planned)

Technical
- Line length: 8.877 km (5.516 mi) (Phase 1)
- Character: Underground
- Operating speed: 80 km/h (50 mph)

Line 28 of the Beijing Subway (Chinese: 北京地铁28号线; pinyin: běijīng dìtiě èrshíbā hàoxiàn) is a rapid transit line under construction in Beijing. It was formerly known as CBD line.

Construction started in July 2021. It is planned to open in 2029.

== List of stations ==
Station Name		Connections	Distance km	Location
English	Chinese	Connections	Distance km	Location
Dongdaqiao	东大桥	6 17 Pinggu		Chaoyang
Jintai Xizhao	金台夕照	10 Pinggu		Chaoyang
Guanghualu	光华路			Chaoyang
Hexinqu	核心区			Chaoyang
Dawang Lu	大望路	1 14		Chaoyang
Beijing East railway station	北京东站	Sub-Central BOP		Chaoyang
Dajiaoting	大郊亭	7		Chaoyang
Guangqulu	广渠路			Chaoyang
Guangqudonglu	广渠东路			Chaoyang

== History ==
In August 2015, planning authorities proposed an underground automatic people mover (APM) line through the Central Business District (CBD).

According to the most recent plan announced in August 2019, the line will run 8.877 km (5.516 mi), have 9 stations from Dongdaqiao to Guangqudonglu. The line was redesigned into a higher capacity light metro line, not an automatic people mover (APM).

A feasibility study for the line was approved in October 2020.

Construction started in July 2021.

== Rolling stock ==
It will use 6-car Type L_{B} linear motor rolling stock, similar to the Capital Airport Express of Beijing Subway, and Guangzhou Metro's Line 4, Line 5 and Line 6.
