= Line 22 (Beijing Subway) =

Rapid transit line under construction in Beijing and Sanhe

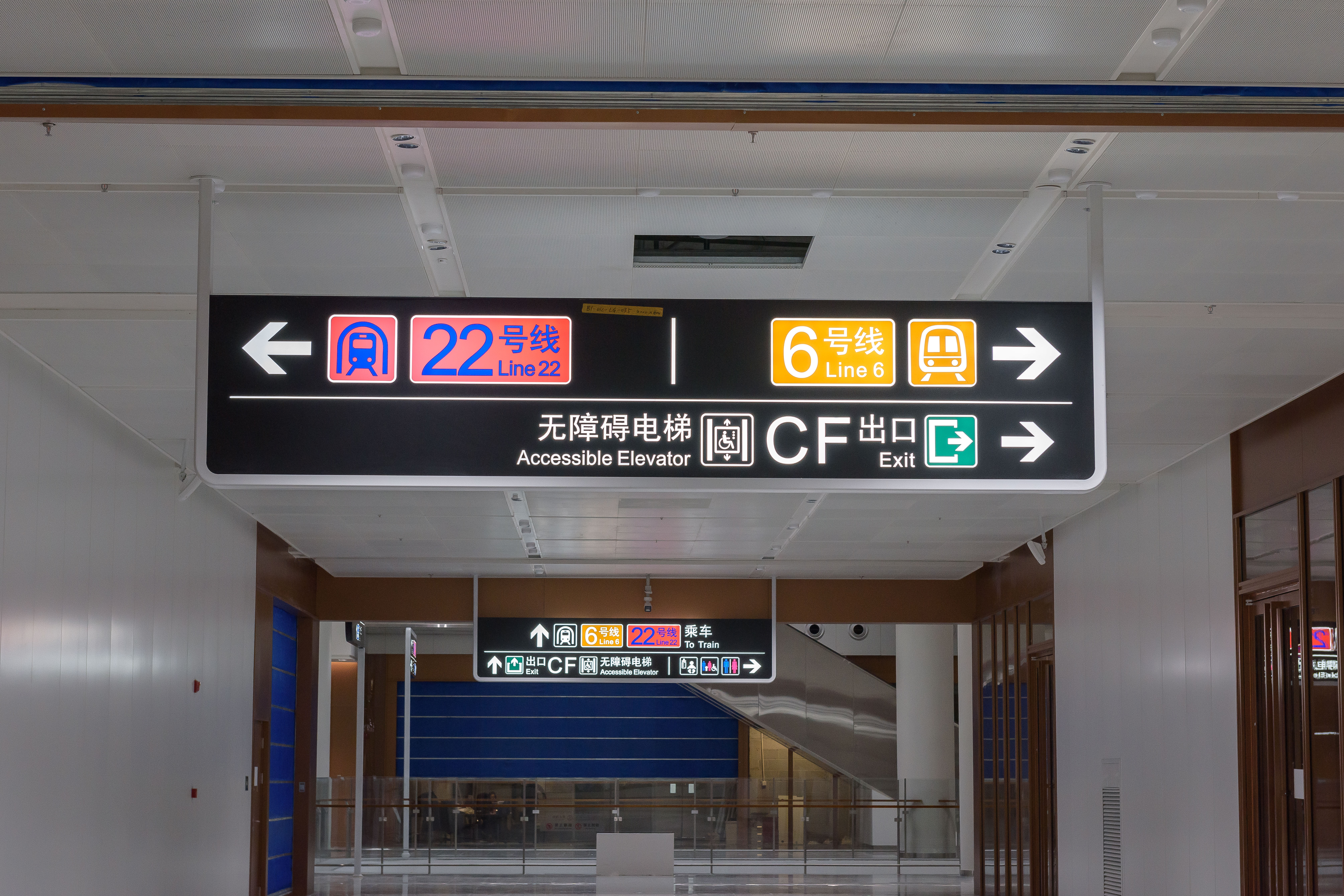
- When Beijing Tongzhou railway station was opened, the sign for Line 22 was already hung

Overview
- Other name(s): M22 (planned name); Pinggu line (construction name)
- Status: Under construction
- Locale: Chaoyang, Tongzhou and Pinggu districts (Beijing) & Sanhe (Langfang, Hebei Province)
- Termini: Dongdaqiao; Pinggu
- Stations: 22

Service
- Type: Rapid Transit
- System: Beijing Subway
- Rolling stock: 8-car Type D

History
- Planned opening: 2026 (planned)

Technical
- Track gauge: 1,435 mm (4 ft 8 1/2 in) standard gauge
- Electrification: Dual voltage 25 kV 50 Hz AC and 1,500 V DC overhead wire
- Operating speed: 160 km/h (99 mph) (Maximum speed); 120 km/h (75 mph) (Underground section)

Line 22
- Simplified Chinese: 北京地铁22号线
Transcriptions
Standard Mandarin
- Hanyu Pinyin: Běijīng Dìtiě Èrshí'èr Hào Xiàn

Line 22 of the Beijing Subway is a rapid transit line under construction in Beijing and Hebei Province. It will run from Dongdaqiao station in Chaoyang District to Pinggu station in Pinggu District with 22 stations, including 19 underground stations and 3 elevated stations (Qixinzhuang, Mafang Wuliugang, and Nongyezhongguancun). The length of the line is 81.82 km (50.84 mi), and 53.8 km (33.4 mi) will be underground. The line will use 8-car Type D rolling stock and will open between Hongmiao and Pinggu in late 2026, with Jintai Xizhao and Dongdaqiao stations opening in 2029.

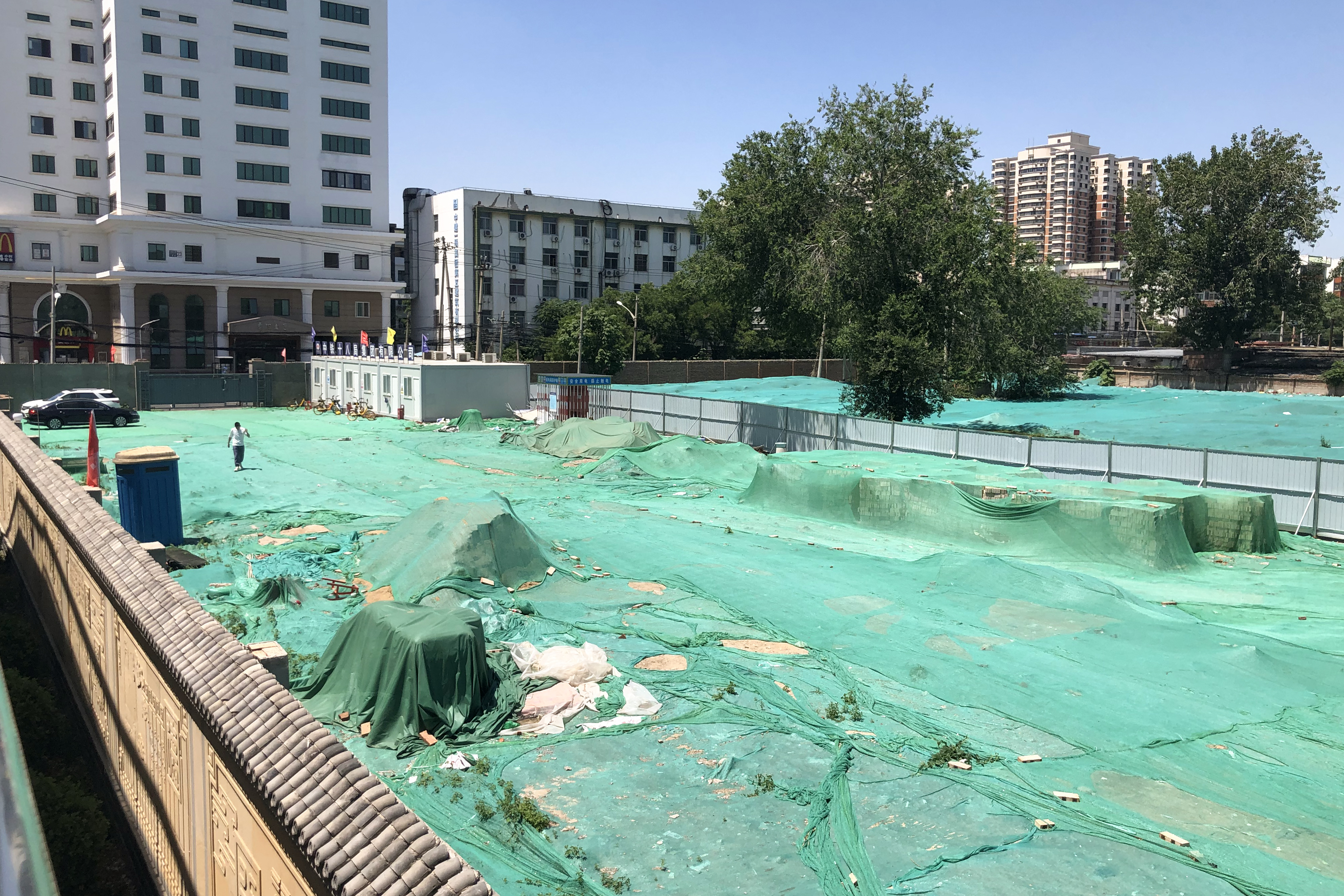
Dingfuzhuang station construction site undertaken by China Railway 18th Bureau (June 2021)

== Stations ==
Station Name		Connections	Distance km	Location	
English	Chinese	Connections	Distance km	Location	
Dongdaqiao	东大桥	6 17 28		Chaoyang	Beijing
Jintai Xizhao	金台夕照	10 28		Chaoyang	Beijing
Hongmiao	红庙	14		Chaoyang	Beijing
Ciyunsi Qiao	慈云寺桥			Chaoyang	Beijing
Ganluyuan	甘露园			Chaoyang	Beijing
Dingfuzhuang	定福庄			Chaoyang	Beijing
Guaanzhuang	管庄	Batong		Chaoyang	Beijing
Yongshun	永顺			Tongzhou	Beijing
Tongzhou Beiguan	通州北关	6		Tongzhou	Beijing
Furong Xilu	芙蓉西路			Tongzhou	Beijing
Beijing Tongzhou Railway Station	北京通州站	M101 6 (via Beiyunhedong)		Tongzhou	Beijing
Luyuan	潞源			Tongzhou	Beijing
Luyuandong	潞源东			Tongzhou	Beijing
Yanjiaonan	燕郊南			Sanhe	Langfang, Hebei Province
Shenwei Dajie	神威大街			Sanhe	Langfang, Hebei Province
Chaobai Dajie	潮白大街			Sanhe	Langfang, Hebei Province
Gaolou	高楼			Sanhe	Langfang, Hebei Province
Qixinzhuang	齐心庄			Sanhe	Langfang, Hebei Province
Mafang Wuliugang	马坊物流港			Pinggu	Beijing
Nongye Zhongguancun	农业中关村			Pinggu	Beijing
Guononggang	国农港			Pinggu	Beijing
Pinggu	平谷			Pinggu	Beijing

== History ==
The line was originally planned to begin at Dongfeng Beiqiao station and will end at Juhewan station in Pinggu District.

However, in 2019, it was announced that the line will run in a different route. The line will still start in the urban center of Pinggu District. However, when reaching Yanjiao the line will instead head south through Tongzhou District and run under Chaoyang Road between Line 6 and the Batong Line towards Beijing central business district (Beijing CBD). The original plan to terminate the line at Dongfeng Beiqiao station is now reserved as long-term planning. This was done to serve more populated areas of the city and enhance integration between Beijing's city center and its new sub-center in Tongzhou District.

On 25 August 2026, the section from Hongmiao to Pinggu entered the trial operation without passengers.
