= Dawang Lu station =

Beijing Subway interchange station

Dawang Lu 大望路
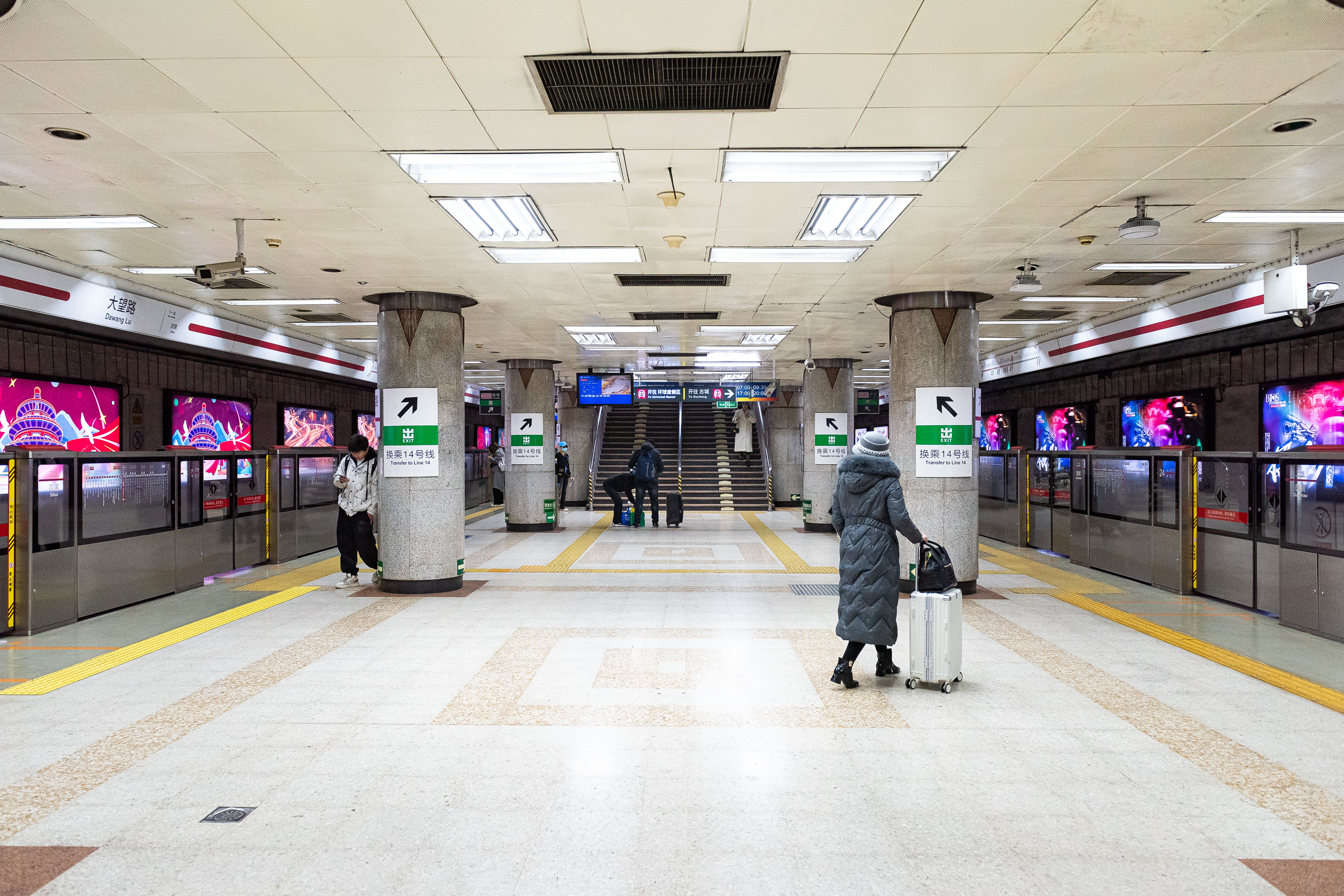
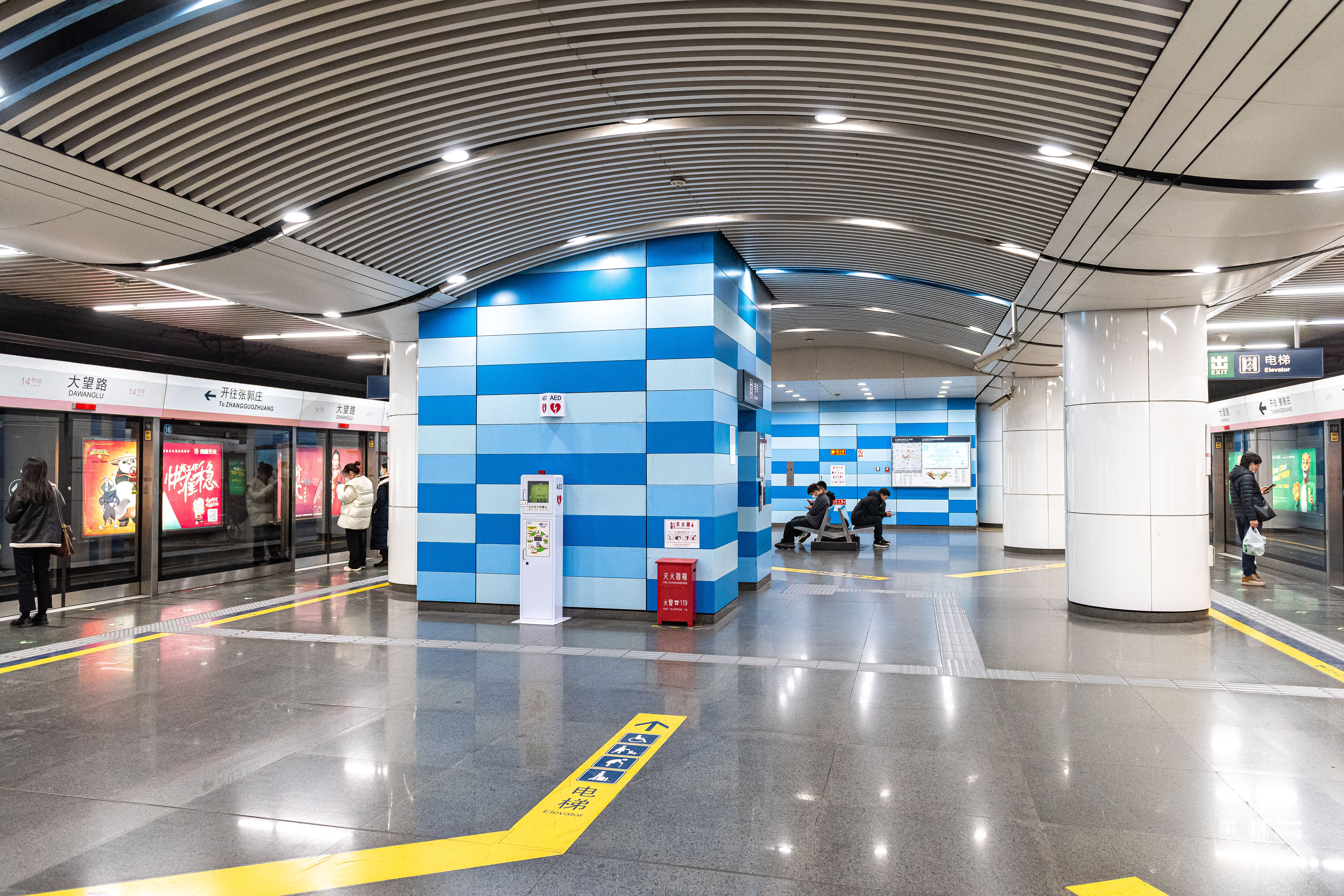
- Line 1 platform Line 14 platform

General information
- Location: Dawang Bridge (大望桥), intersection of Jianguo Road (建国路) and West Dawang Road (西大望路); Chaoyang District, Beijing; China
- Coordinates: 39°54′30″N 116°28′40″E
- Operator: Beijing Mass Transit Railway Operation Corporation Limited (line 1); Beijing MTR Corporation Limited (line 14)
- Lines: Line 1; Line 14
- Platforms: 4 (2 island platforms)
- Tracks: 4

Construction
- Structure type: Underground
- Accessible: Yes

Other information
- Station code: 123 (Line 1)

History
- Opened: September 28, 1999; 26 years ago (Line 1); December 26, 2015; 10 years ago (Line 14)

Services
Preceding station	Beijing Subway	Following station
Guomao towards Pingguoyuan	Line 1	Sihui towards Universal Resort
Jiulongshan towards Zhangguozhuang	Line 14	Jintai Lu towards Shangezhuang
Location
- Location within Beijing

Dawang Lu station (Chinese: 大望路站; pinyin: Dàwàng Lù zhàn) is an interchange station between Line 1 and Line 14 of the Beijing Subway. As of 2013, Dawang Lu station was the most used entrance/exit point to the Beijing Subway, with about 160,000 entrances and exits per day. Line 14 station was opened on December 26, 2015.

== Station layout ==
Both the line 1 and line 14 stations have underground island platforms.

== Exits ==
There are seven exits, lettered A, B, C, D, E, F, and H. Exits D and E are accessible.

== Future plan ==
Once complete, the station will also transfer to Line 28.

== Gallery ==
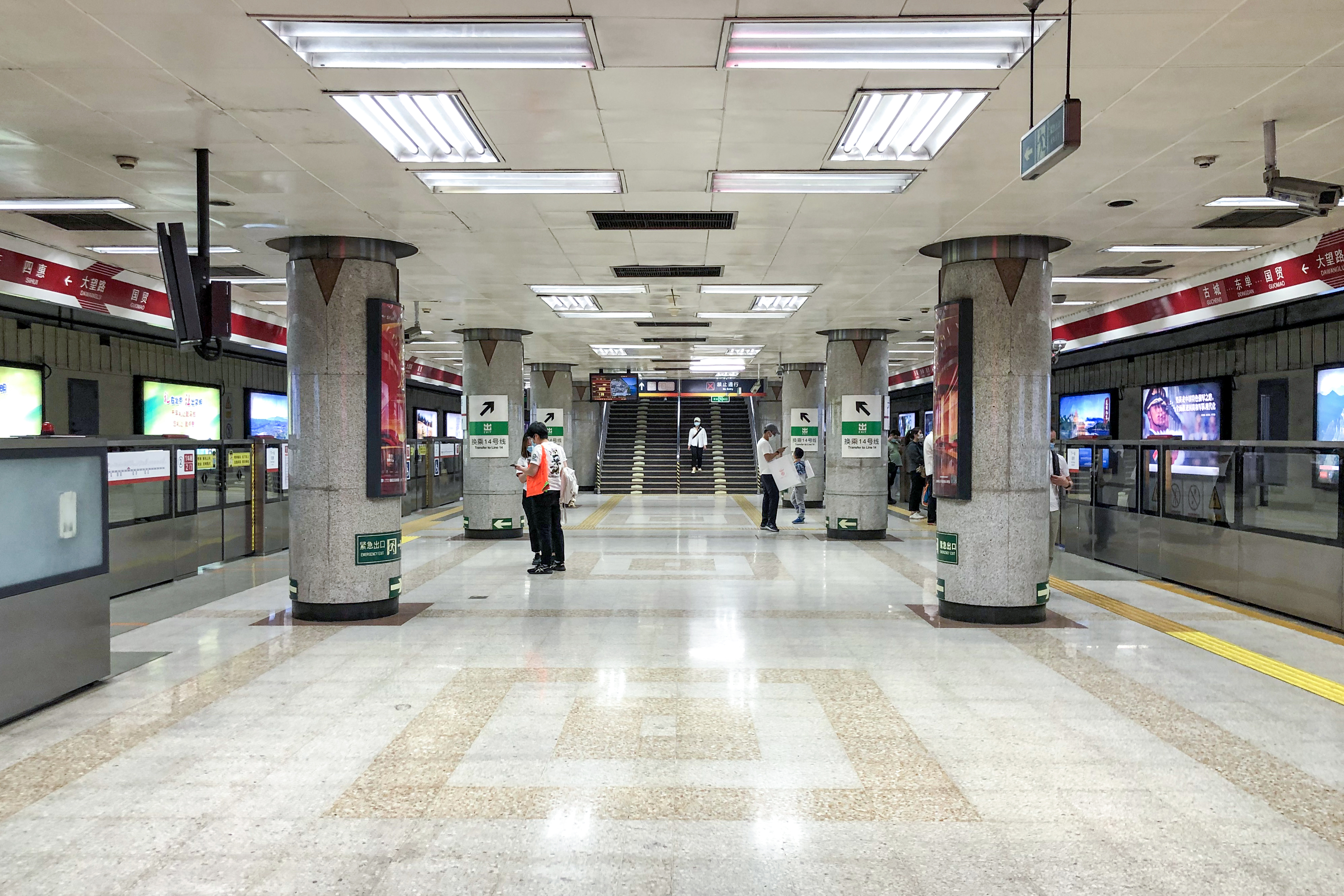
Line 1 platform (September 2020)

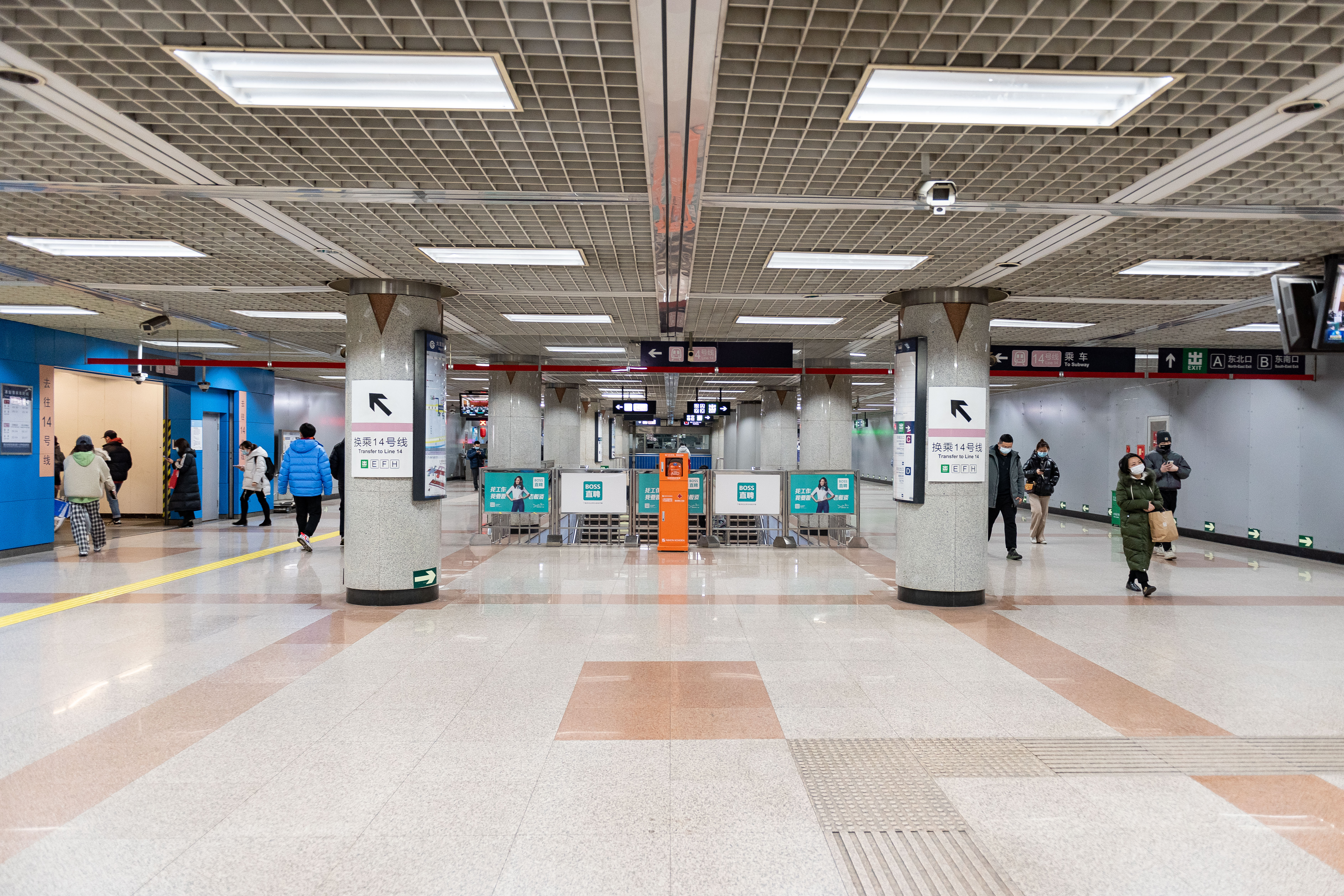
Line 1 concourse

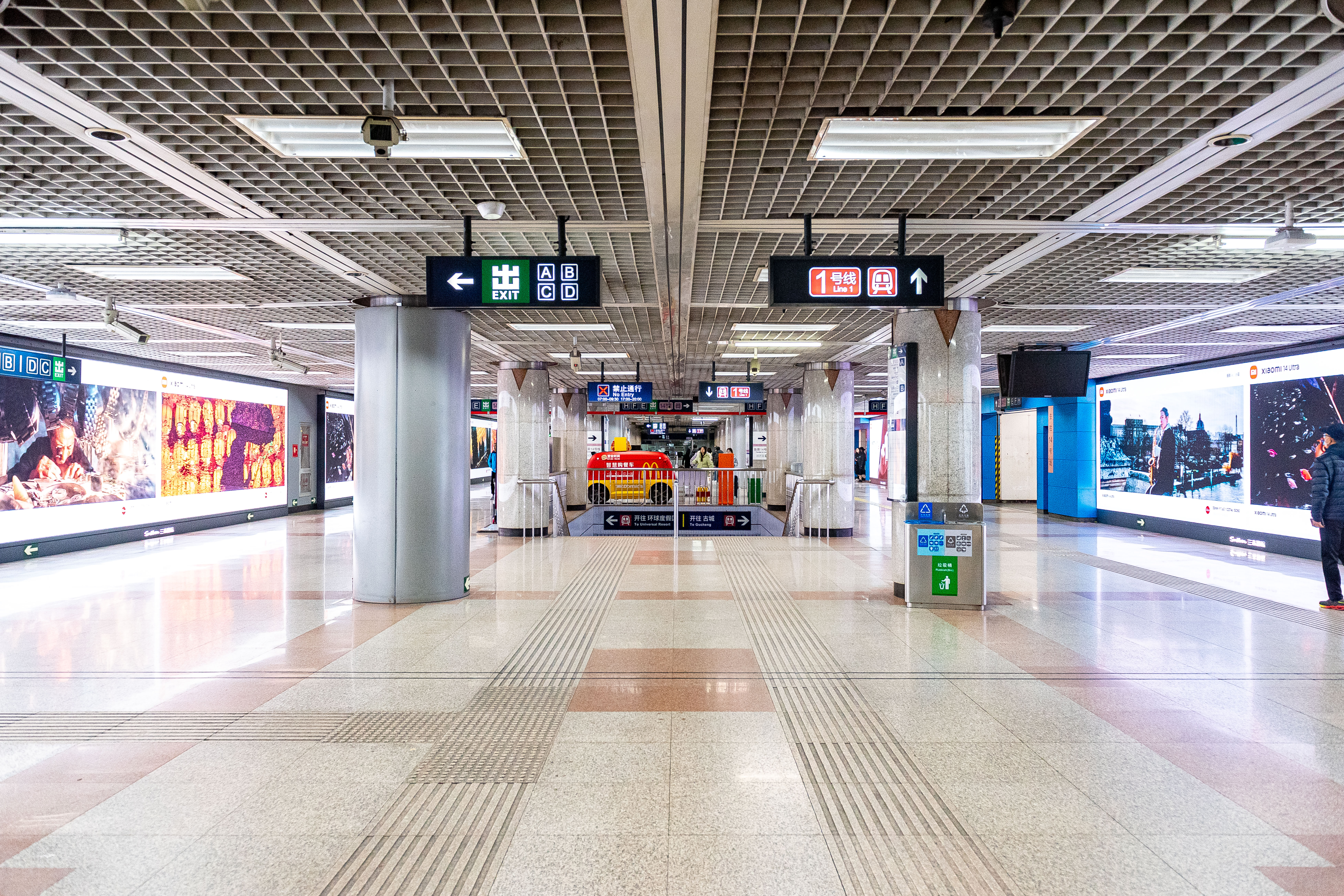
Line 1 concourse

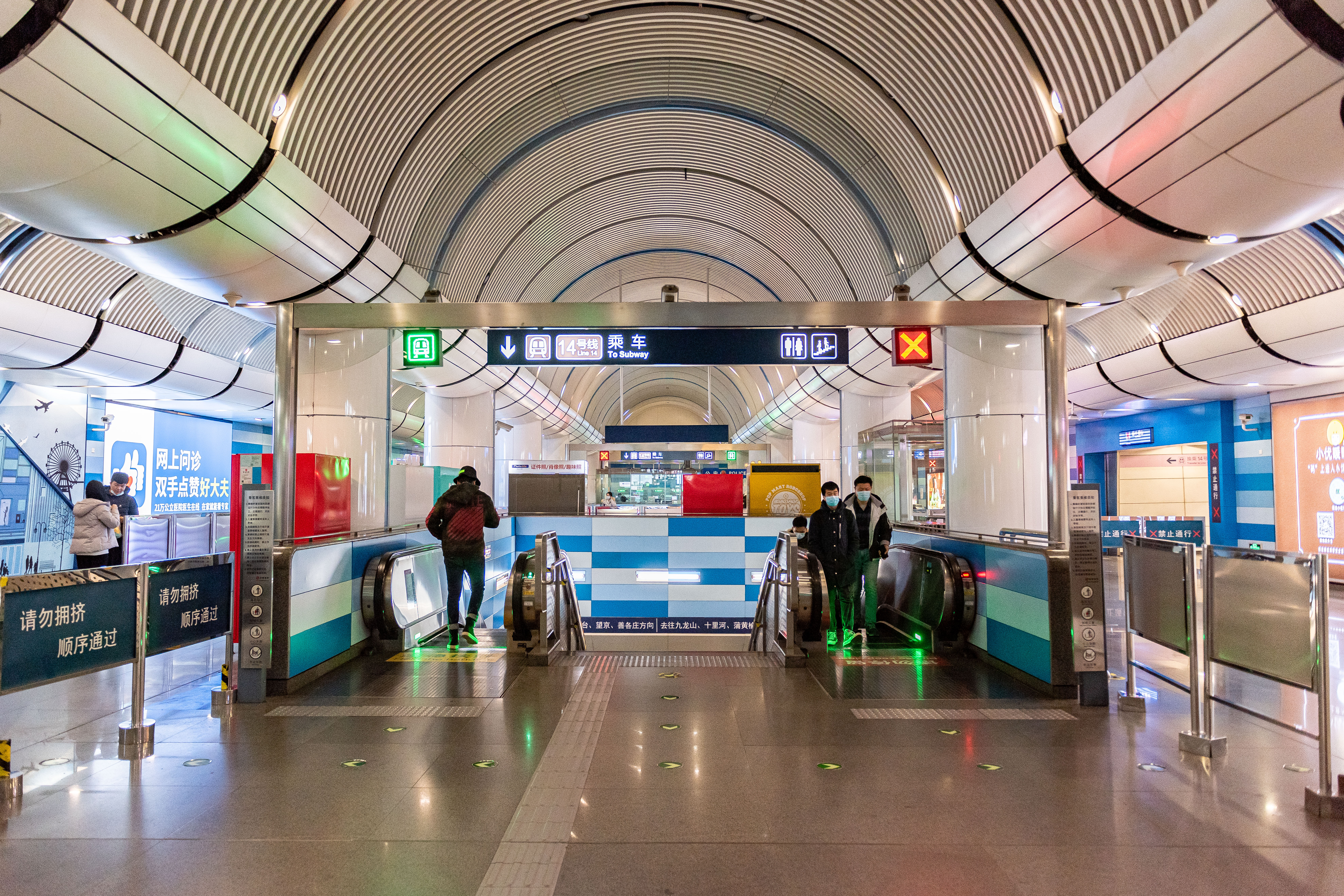
Line 14 concourse
