= Jintai Xizhao station =

Beijing Subway station

Jintai Xizhao 金台夕照
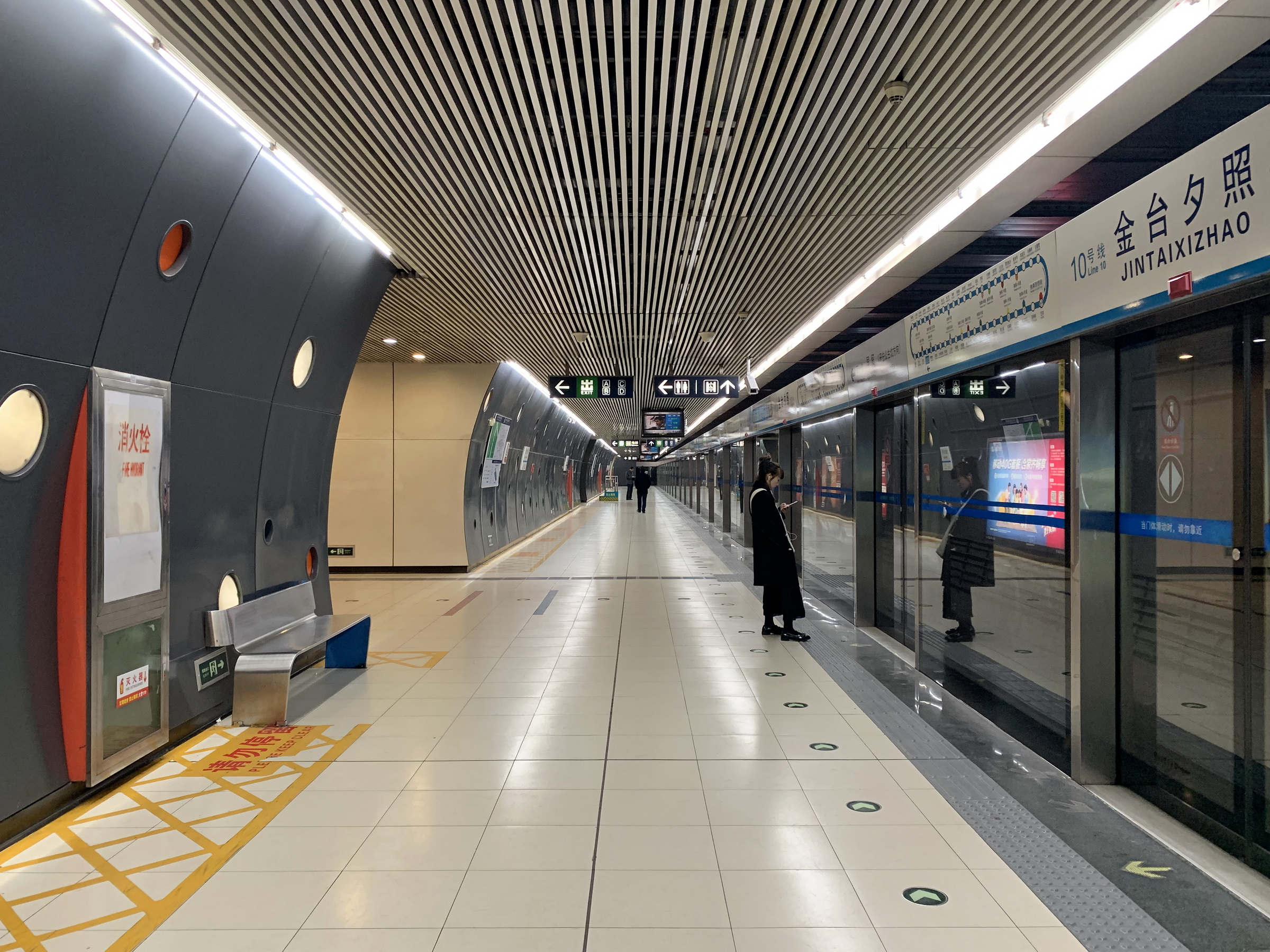
- Clockwise platform

General information
- Location: East 3rd Ring Road Middle; Chaoyang District, Beijing; China
- Coordinates: 39°55′01″N 116°27′42″E
- Operator: Beijing Mass Transit Railway Operation Corporation Limited
- Lines: Line 10; Line 22 (opening 2029)
- Platforms: 2 (1 split island platform)
- Tracks: 2

Construction
- Structure type: Underground
- Accessible: Yes

History
- Opened: July 19, 2008; 18 years ago

Services
Preceding station	Beijing Subway	Following station
Hujialou outer loop / anticlockwise	Line 10	Guomao inner loop / clockwise
Future services
Dongdaqiao Terminus	Line 22 Opening 2029	Hongmiao towards Pinggu
Location
- Location within Beijing

Jintai Xizhao station (Chinese: 金台夕照站; pinyin: Jīntái Xīzhào Zhàn; lit. 'The Golden Terrace in the Glow of the Setting Sun') is a subway station on Line 10 of the Beijing Subway. It is located along East 3rd Ring Road Middle between China National Highway 102, known as Chaoyangmen Outer Street to the west of the 3rd Ring Road and Chaoyang Road to the east, and Guanghua Road.

== Name ==
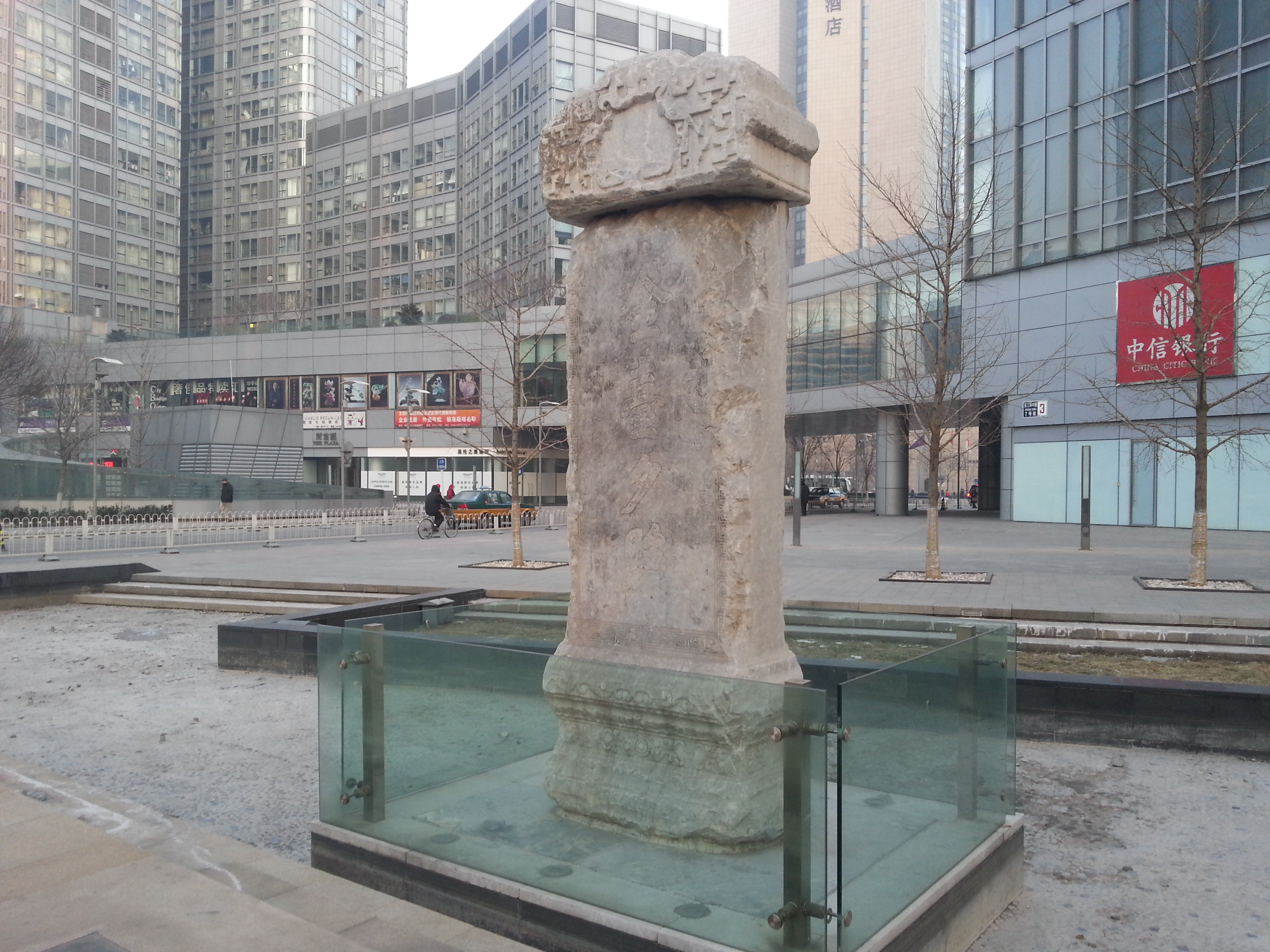
Jintai Xizhao stone tablet

The name originated from one of the Eight Sights of Yanjing. Jintai Xizhao literally means The Golden Terrace in the Glow of the Setting Sun. In 2002, a stone tablet of Jintai Xizhao written by Qianlong Emperor was unearthed under the Jingguang Building the stone tablet was placed near the building after its discovery. The Beijing Subway station was named after the stone tablet when the first phase of Line 10 was opened in 2008.

== Station layout ==
The station has an underground island platform.

== Exits ==
There are 4 exits, lettered A, B, C, and D. Exits A and B are accessible.
