= Dongdaqiao station =

Beijing Subway Line 6 and Line 17 station

Dongdaqiao 东大桥
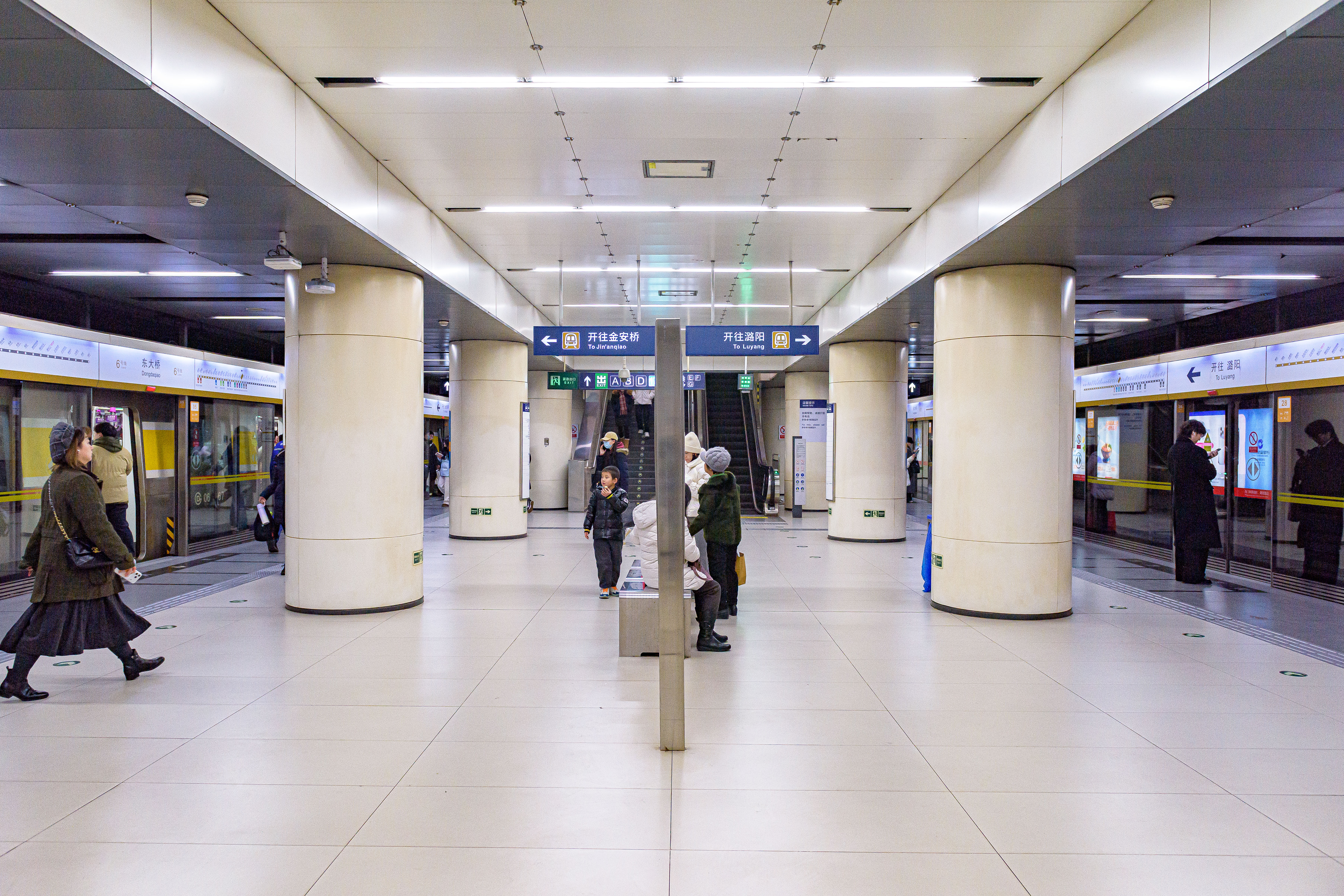
- Line 6 platform

Chinese name
- Simplified Chinese: 东大桥站
- Traditional Chinese: 東大橋站
- Literal meaning: East Big Bridge Station
Transcriptions
Standard Mandarin
- Hanyu Pinyin: Dōng Dà Qiáo Zhàn

General information
- Location: East Workers' Stadium Road (工人体育场东路) / Dongdaqiao Road (东大桥路) and Chaoyangmen Outer Street / North Chaoyang Road (朝阳北路); Chaoyang District, Beijing; China
- Coordinates: 39.923054°N 116.451657°E
- Operator: Beijing Mass Transit Railway Operation Corporation Limited (Lines 6, 22 and 28); Beijing MTR (Line 17)
- Lines: Line 6; Line 17; Line 22 (opening 2029); Line 28 (opening 2029)
- Platforms: 4 (2 island platforms)
- Tracks: 4

Construction
- Structure type: Underground
- Accessible: Yes

History
- Opened: Line 6: December 30, 2012; 13 years ago; Line 17: December 27, 2025; 7 months ago

Services
Preceding station	Beijing Subway	Following station
Chaoyang Men towards Jin'anqiao	Line 6	Hujialou towards Luyang
Workers' Stadium towards Weilaikexuechengbei (Future Science City North)	Line 17	Yong'an Li towards Jiahuihu
Future services
Terminus	Line 22 Opening 2029	Jintai Xizhao towards Pinggu
Terminus	Line 28 Opening 2029	Jintai Xizhao towards Guangqudonglu
Location
- Location within Beijing

Dongdaqiao (simplified Chinese: 东大桥站; traditional Chinese: 東大橋站; pinyin: Dōngdàqiáo Zhàn) is an interchange station between Line 6 and Line 17 of the Beijing Subway. The Line 6 station opened on December 30, 2012, and the Line 17 station opened on December 27, 2025.

== Station features ==
The station has underground island platforms for both Line 6 and Line 17.

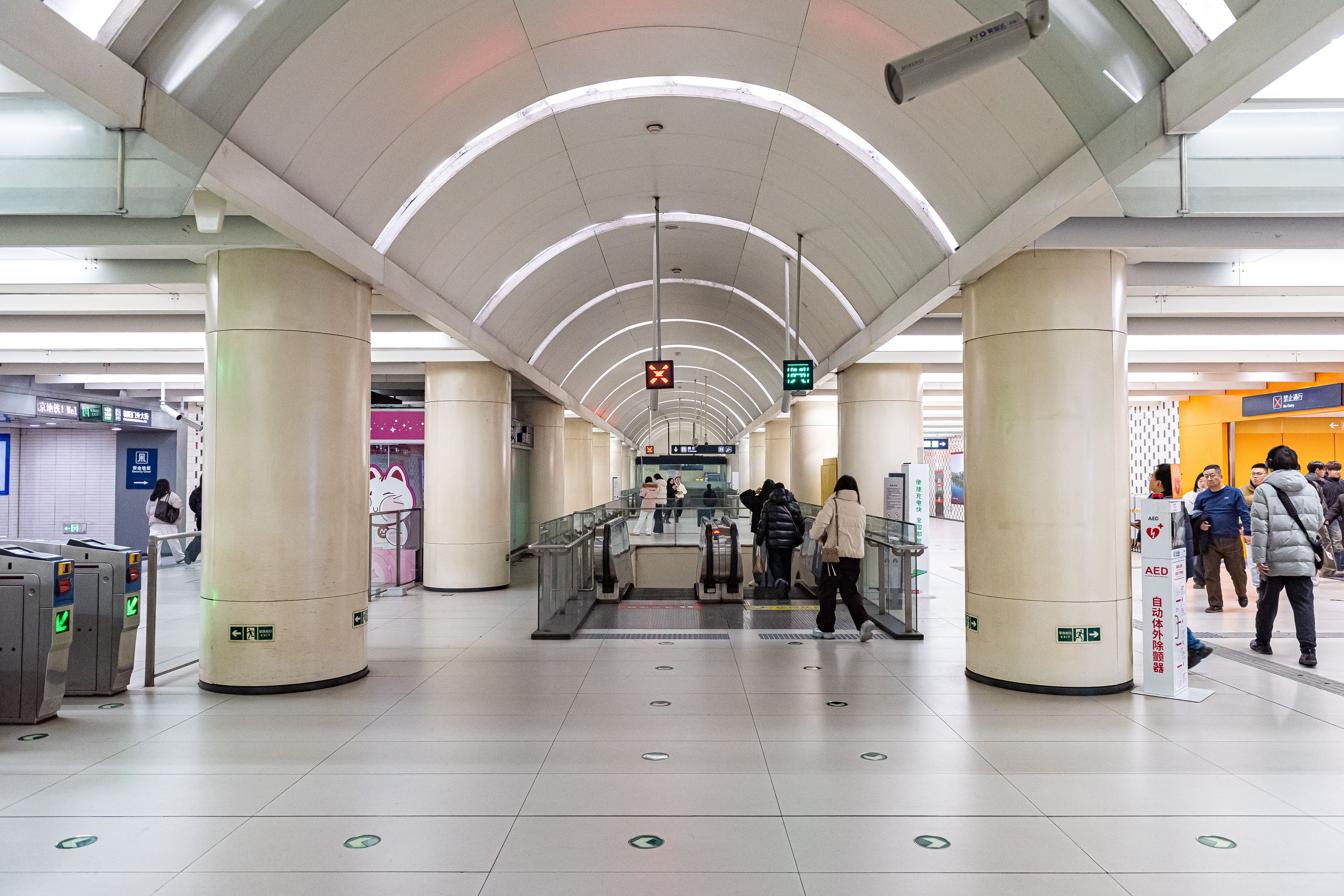
Line 6 concourse

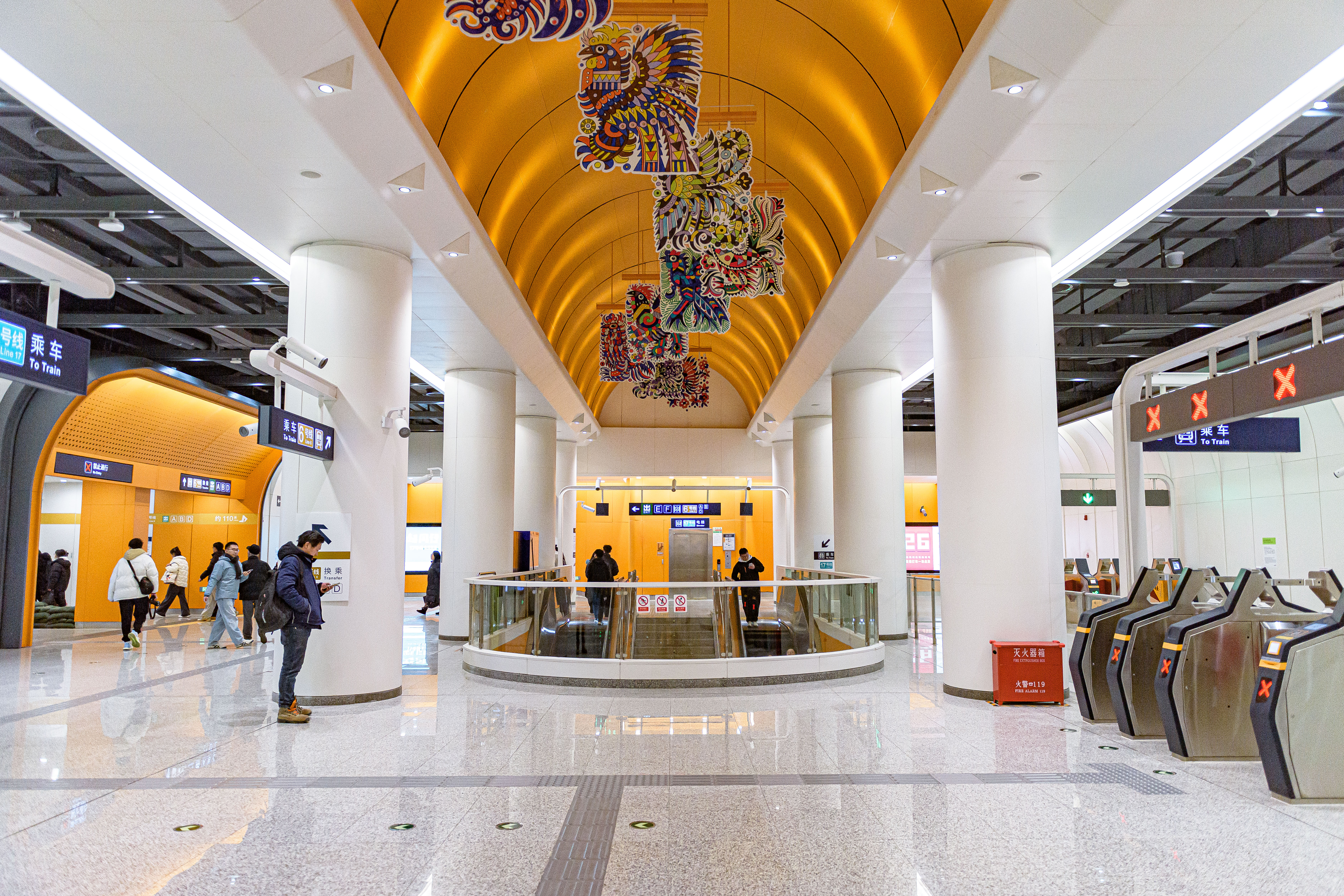
Line 17 north concourse

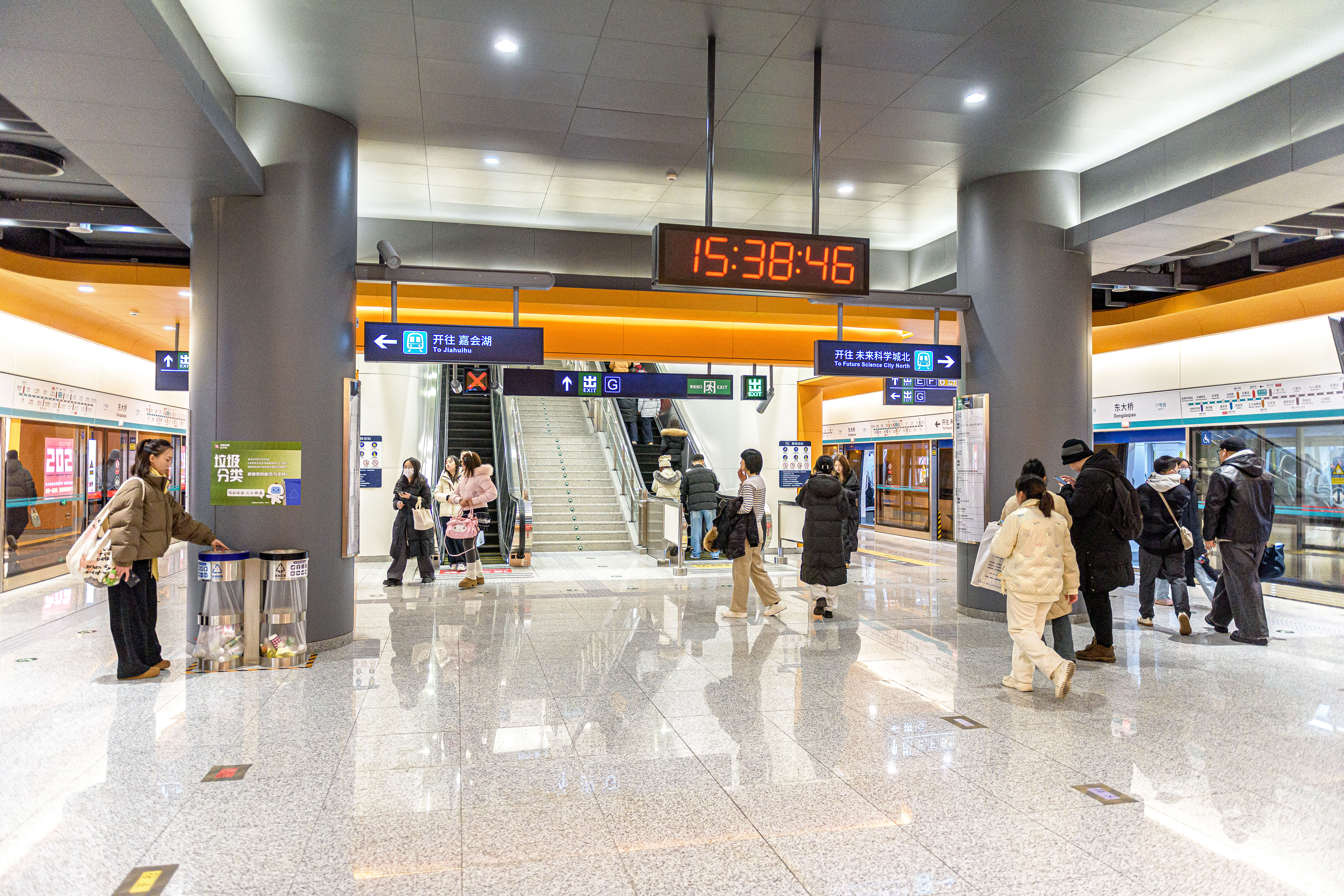
Line 17 platform

=== Exits ===
There are 6 exits, lettered A, B, D1, E, F and G. Exits A, B and D1 are situated on the Line 6 concourse, Exits E and F are situated on the Line 17 north concourse and Exit G is situated on the Line 17 south concourse. Exits D1, E and G are accessible via elevators.

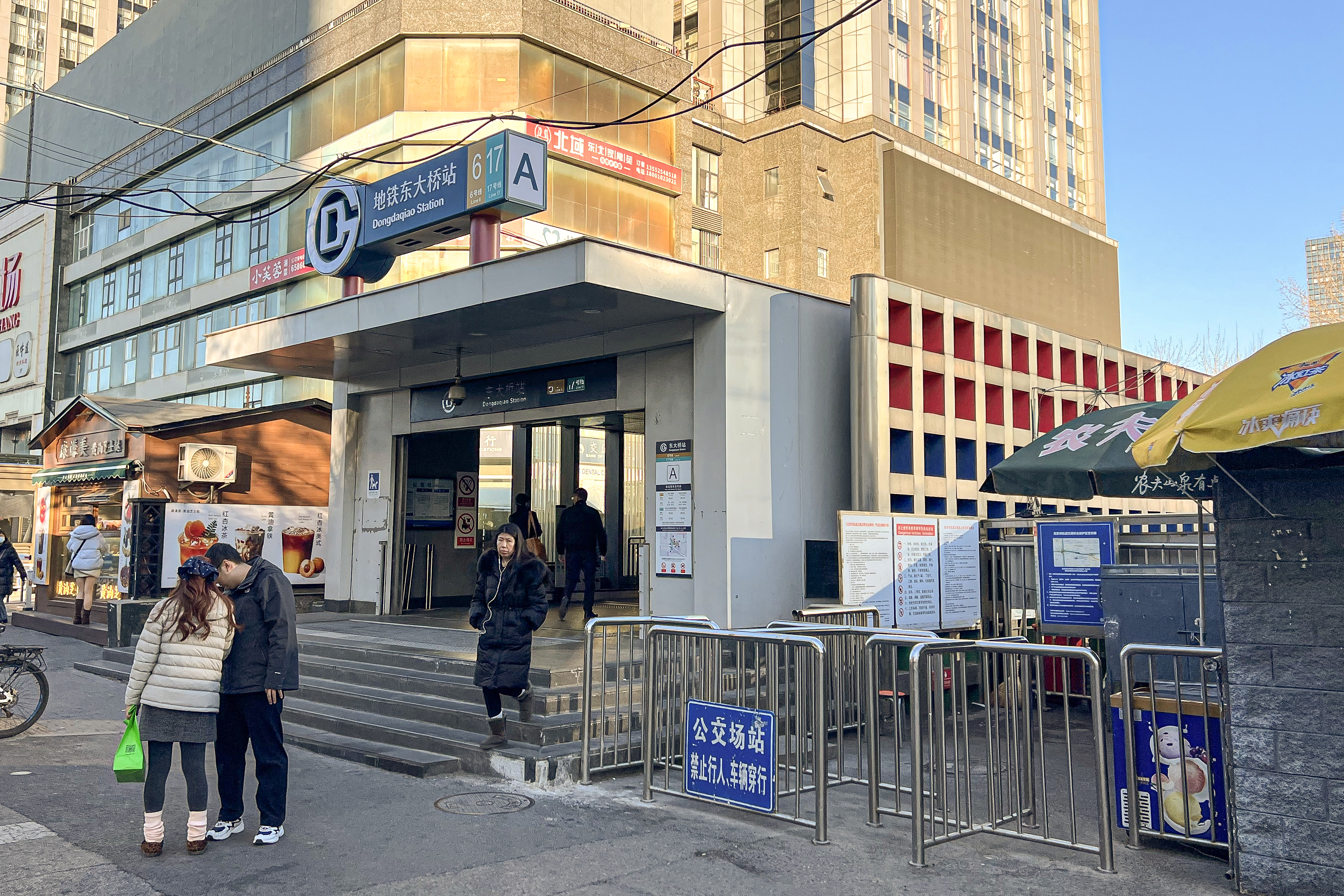
Exit A, Line 6

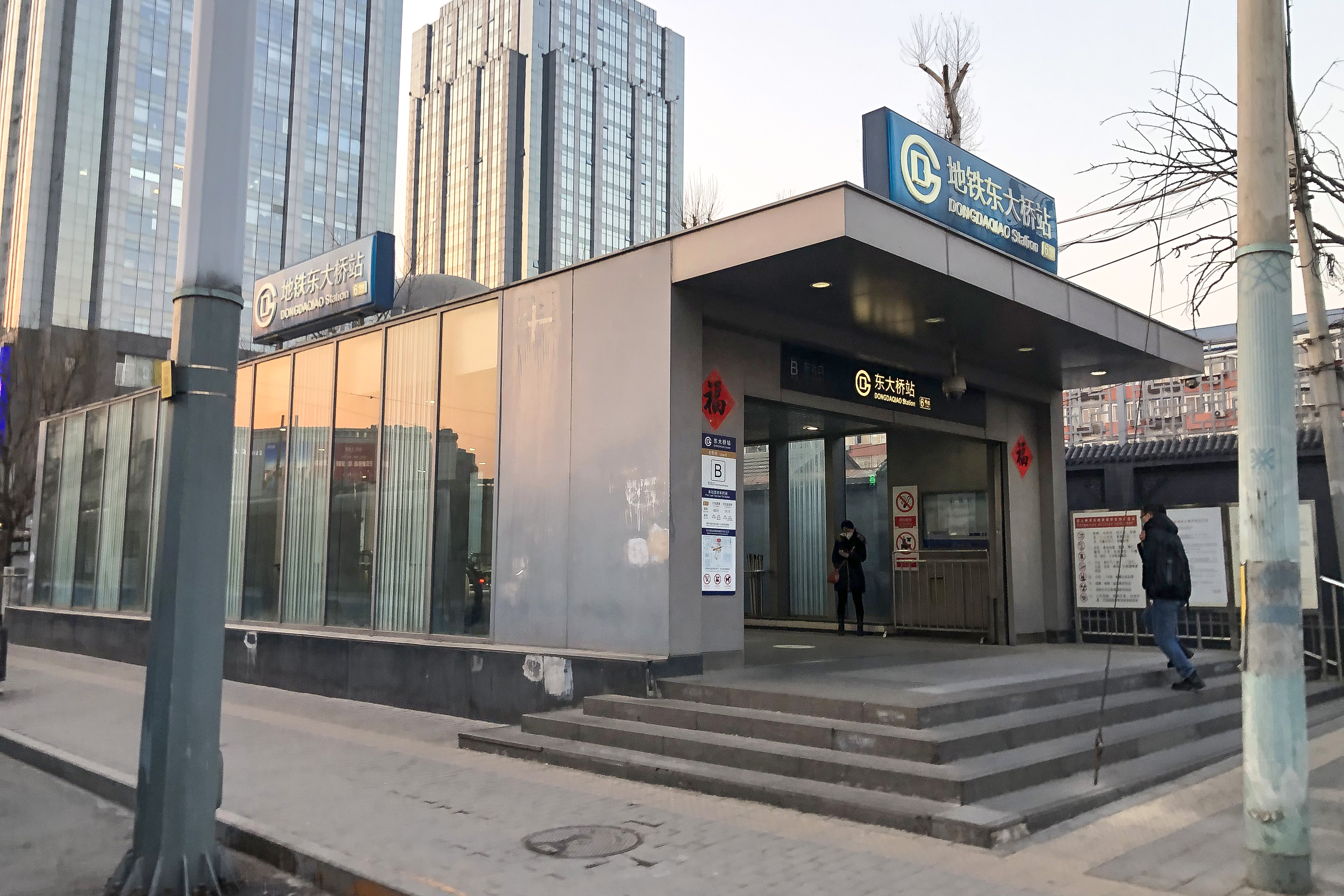
Exit B, Line 6

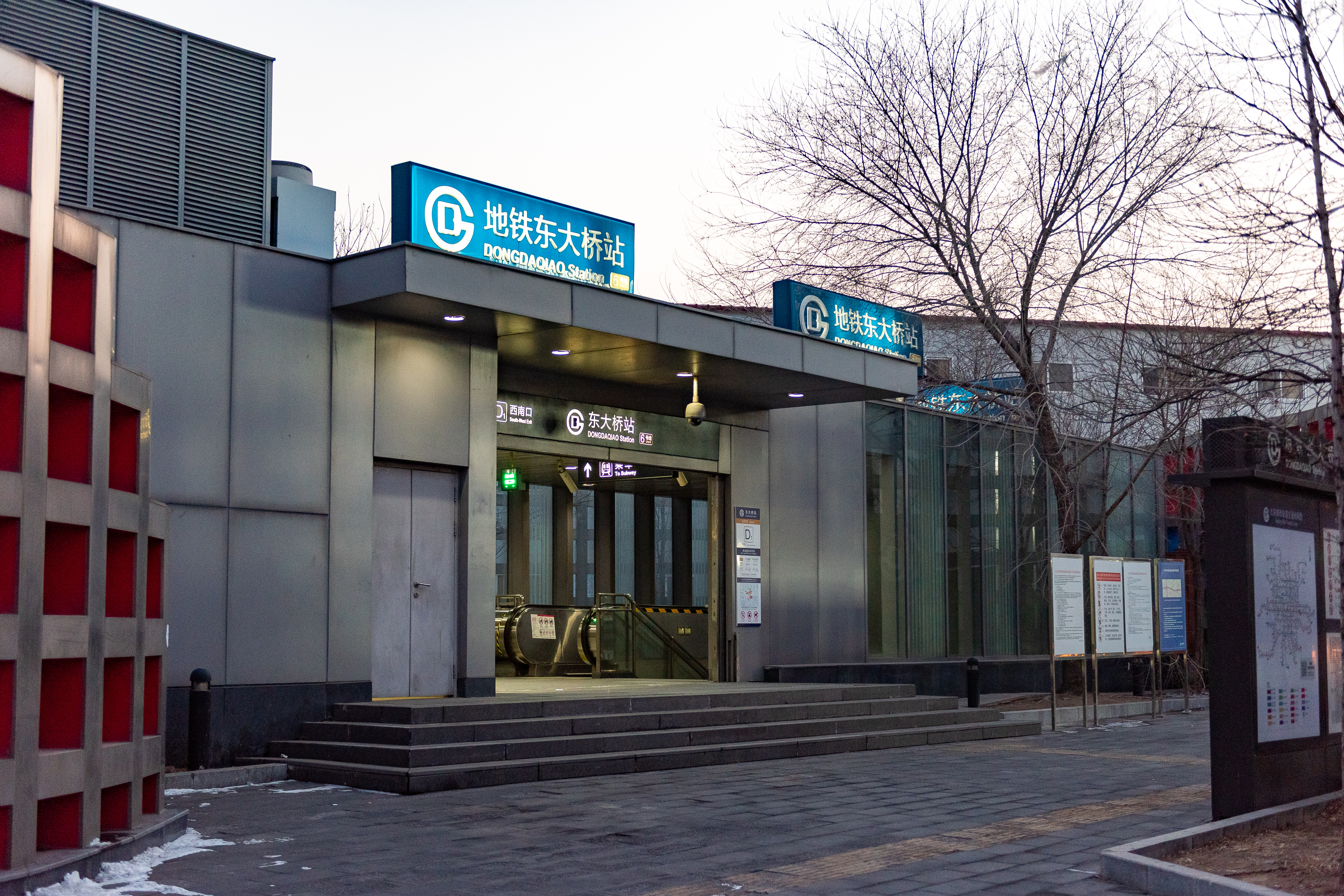
Exit D1, Line 6

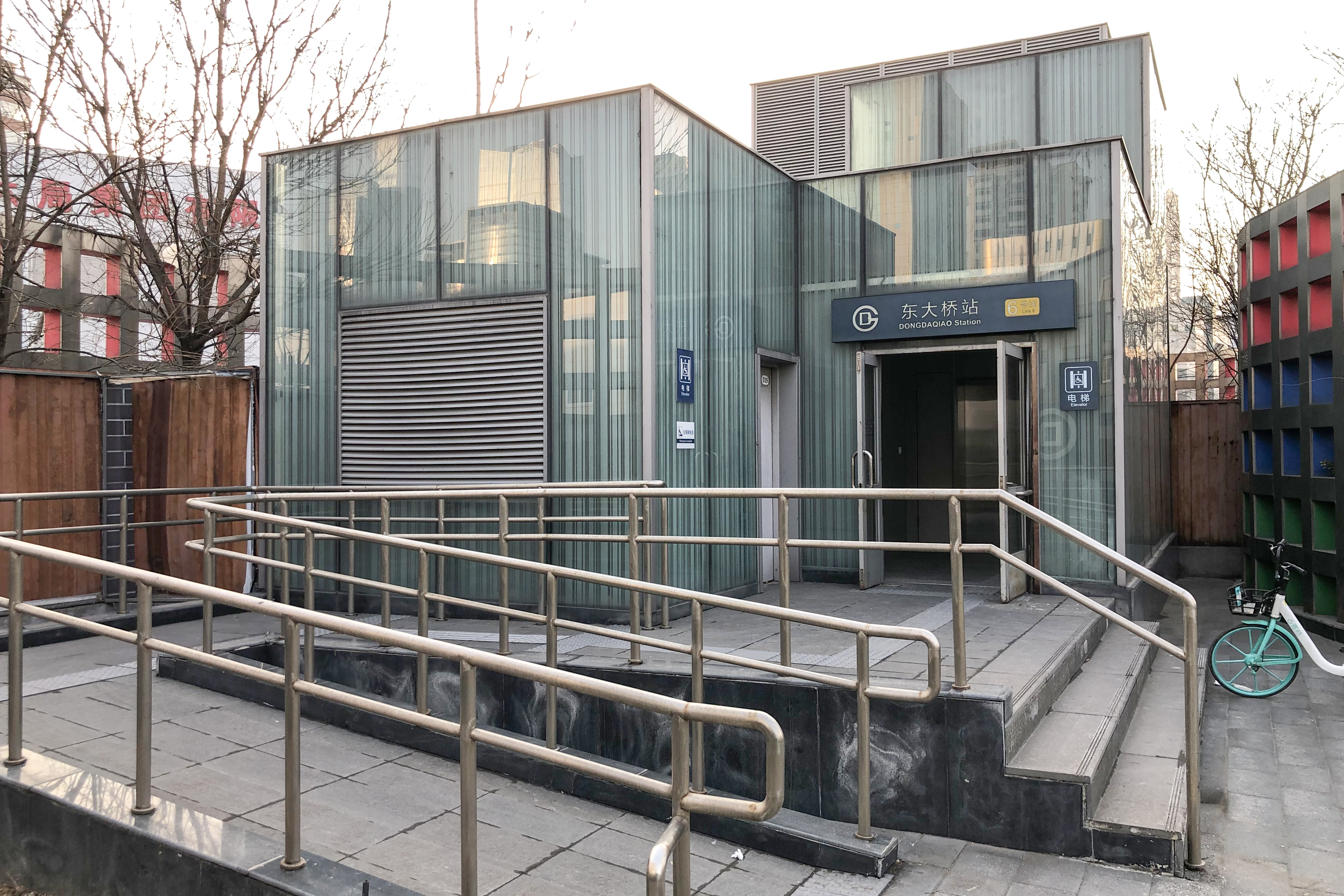
Elevator of Exit D1

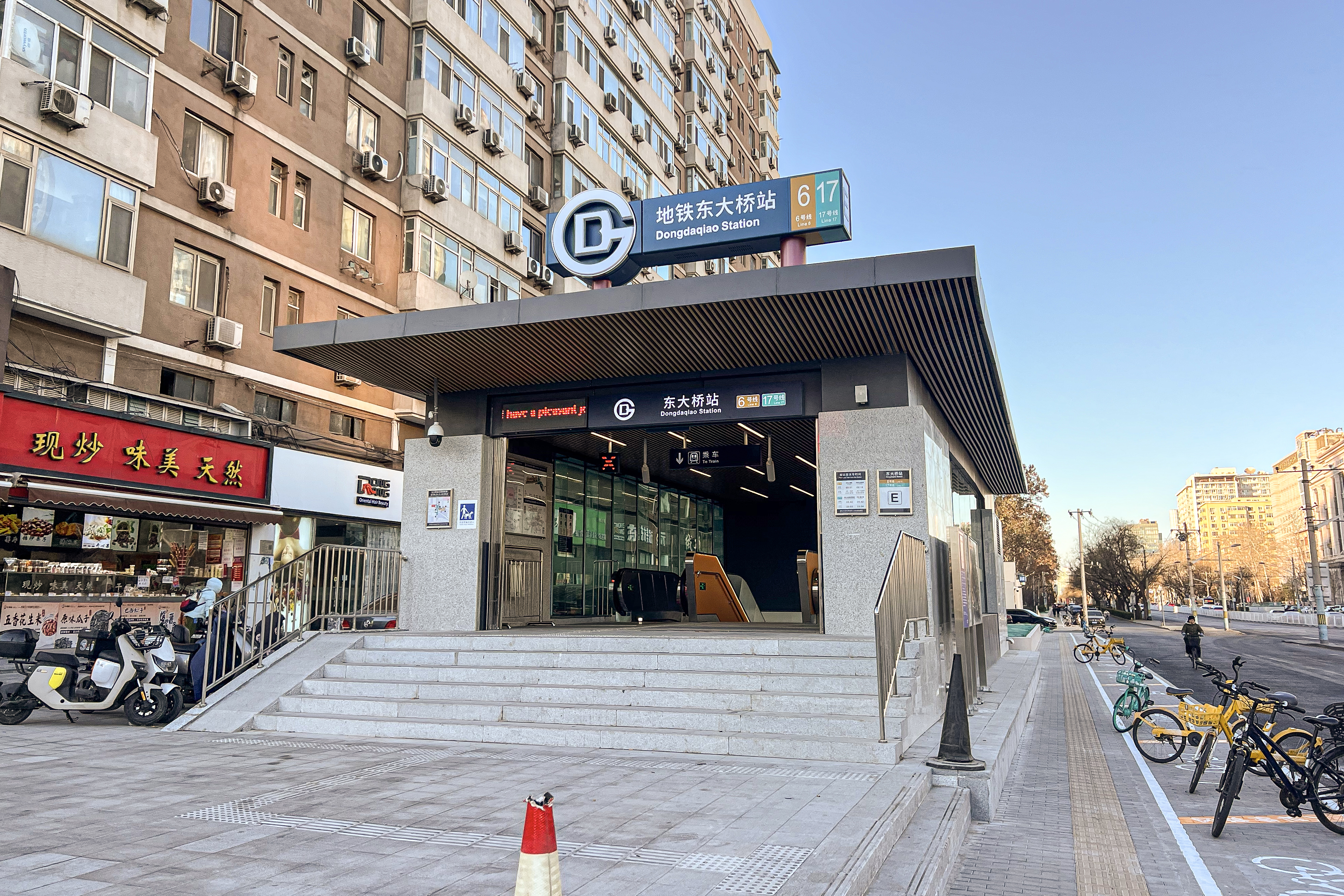
Exit E, Line 17

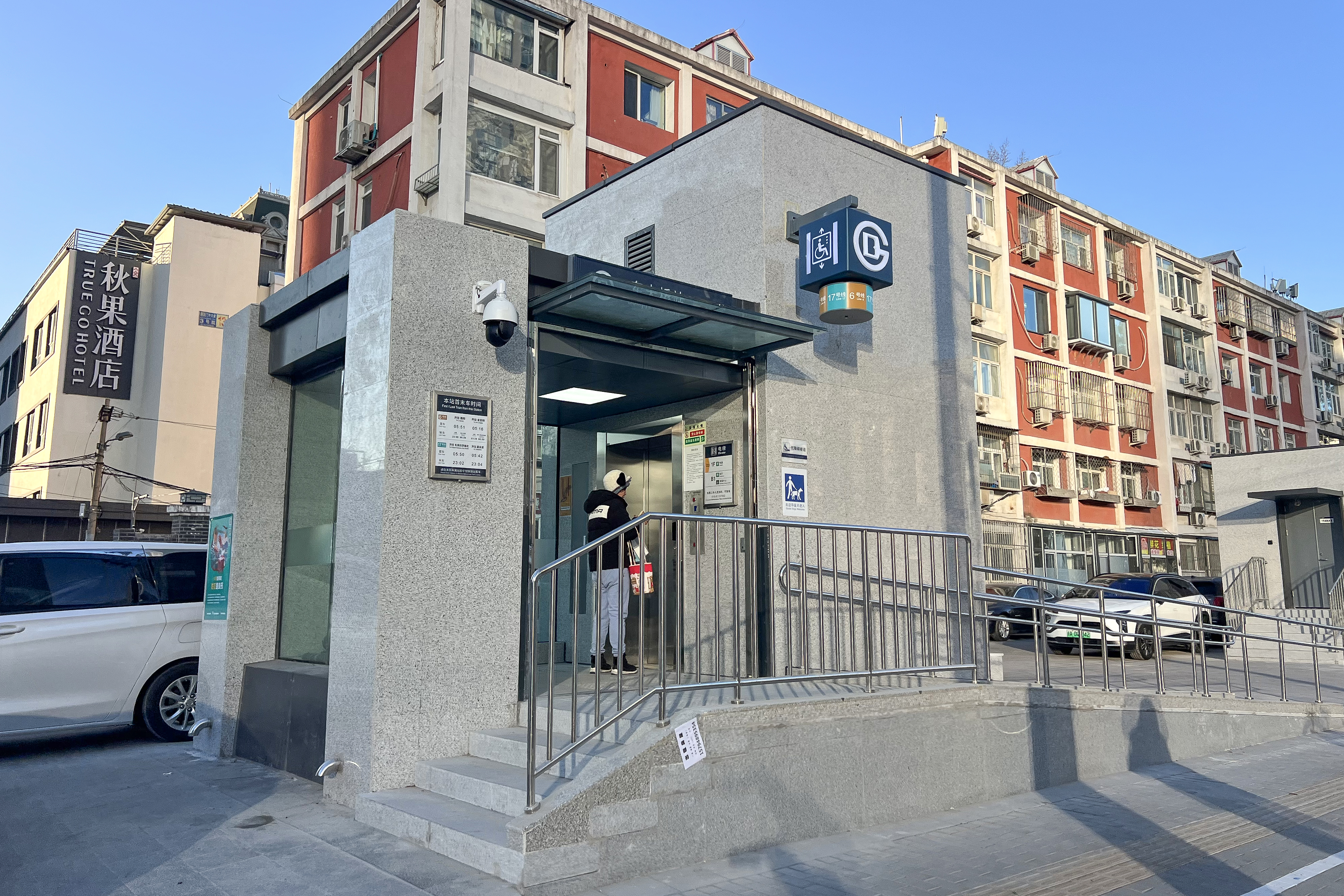
Elevator of Exit E

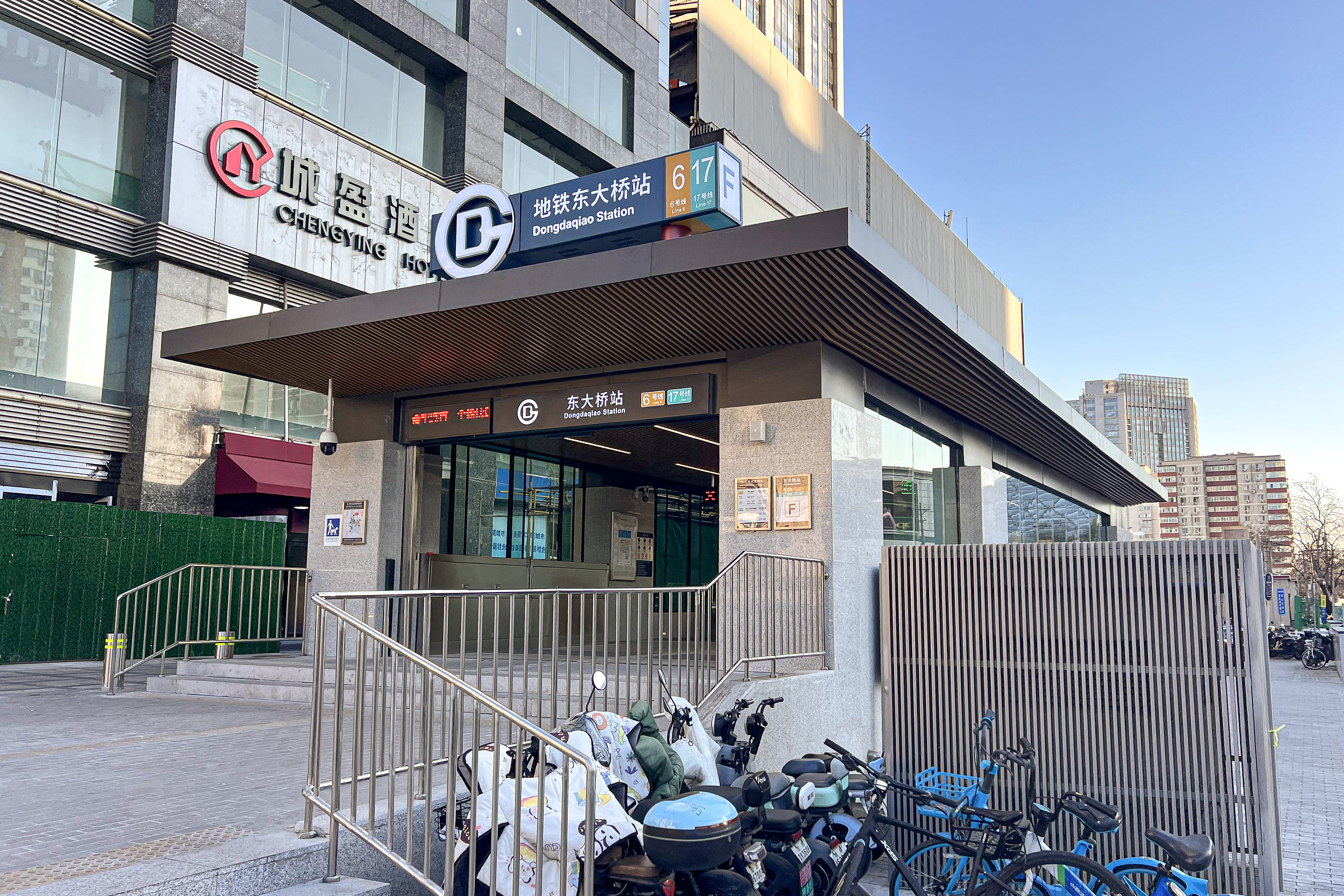
Exit F, Line 17

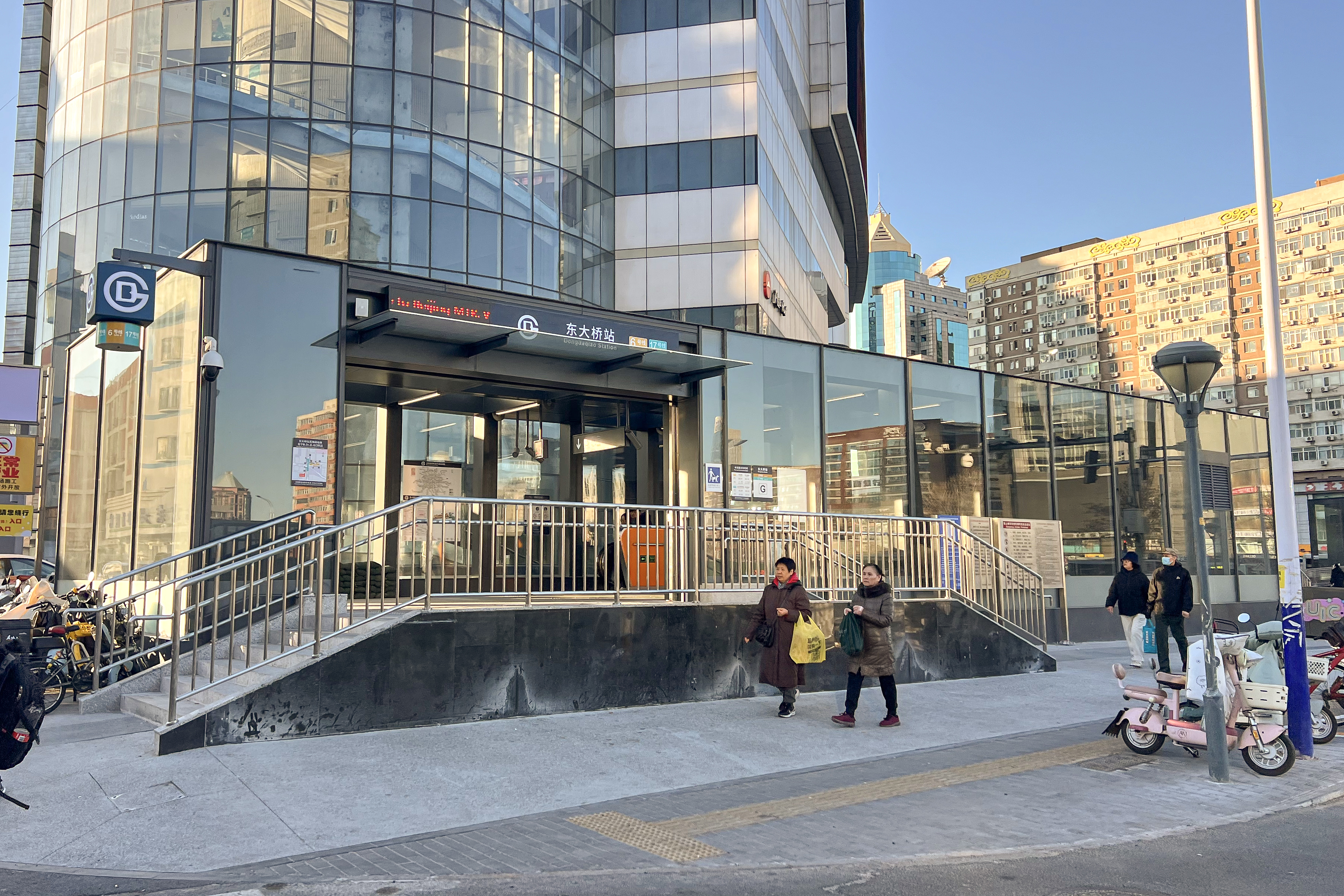
Exit G, Line 17

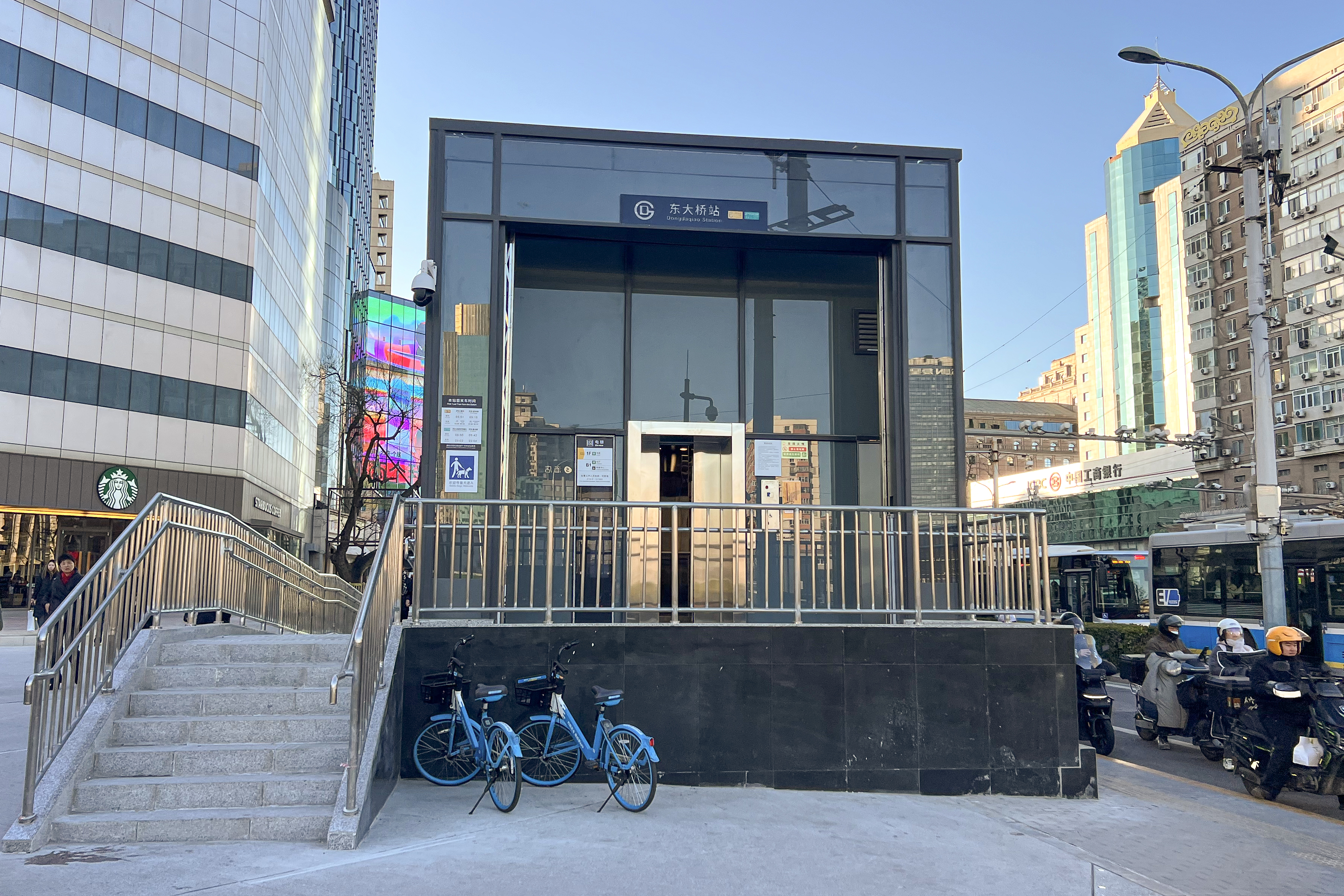
Elevator of Exit G
