= Tanghai South railway station =

Railway station in Hebei, China

Tanghai South 唐海南

General information
- Location: Caofeidian District, Tangshan, Hebei; China
- Coordinates: 39°13′1.88″N 118°35′4.28″E
- Operated by: China Railway
- Line: Tangshan–Caofeidian railway

History
- Opened: 28 December 2018
Location

Tanghai South railway station is a railway station in Caofeidian District, Tangshan, Hebei, China.

Passenger services to Tangshan and Caofeidian East started on 28 December 2018.
