= Beijing Tongzhou railway station =

Railway station in Beijing, China

Beijing Tongzhou 北京通州
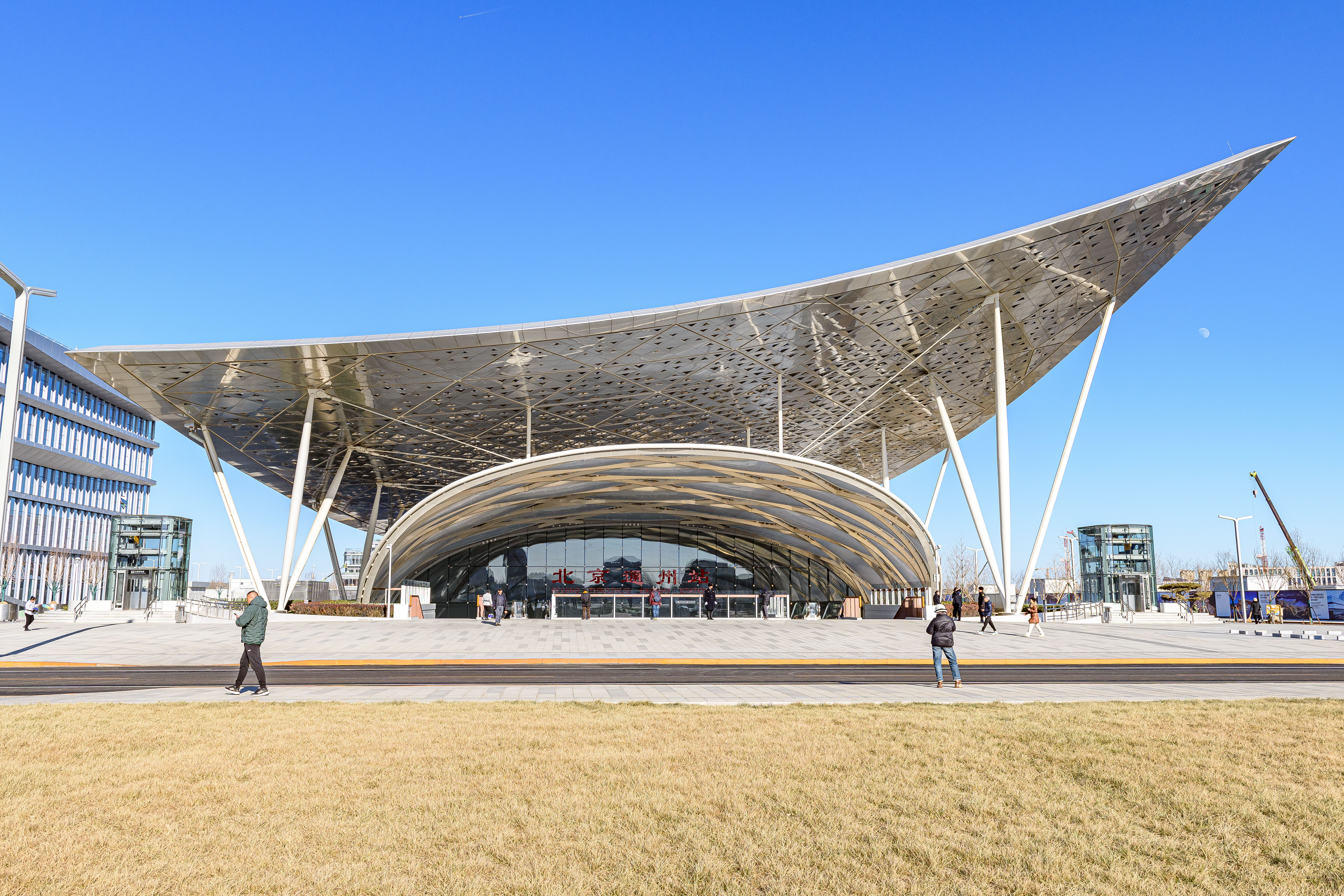
- West entrance

General information
- Other names: Beijing Municipal Administrative Center railway station Beijing Sub-Center railway station
- Location: Tongyun Subdistrict, Tongzhou District, Beijing
- Coordinates: 39.9021°N 116.7021°E
- Owner: Beijing-Tianjin-Hebei Intercity Railway Investment Co., Ltd.
- Operator: China Railway Beijing Group
- Lines: China Railway: Beijing–Tangshan intercity railway; Beijing–Binhai intercity railway; Beijing Suburban Railway: Sub-Central (extension under planning); Beijing Subway: Line 6 (via Beiyunhedong); Line 22 (under construction); Line M101 (under planning)
- Platforms: 6 island, 2 side
- Connections: Beiyunhedong station

Construction
- Structure type: underground
- Depth: 32 metres (105 ft)

History
- Opened: 30 Dec 2025

Services
Transfer at Beiyunhedong station
Preceding station	Beijing Subway	Following station
Beiyunhexi towards Jin'anqiao	Line 6 transfer at Beiyunhedong	Haojiafu towards Luyang

Future services
Preceding station	Beijing Subway	Following station
Yunhe Shangwuqu towards Dongdaqiao	Line 22 Opening 2026	Zhengwuzhongxin towards Pinggu
Location
- Location within Beijing

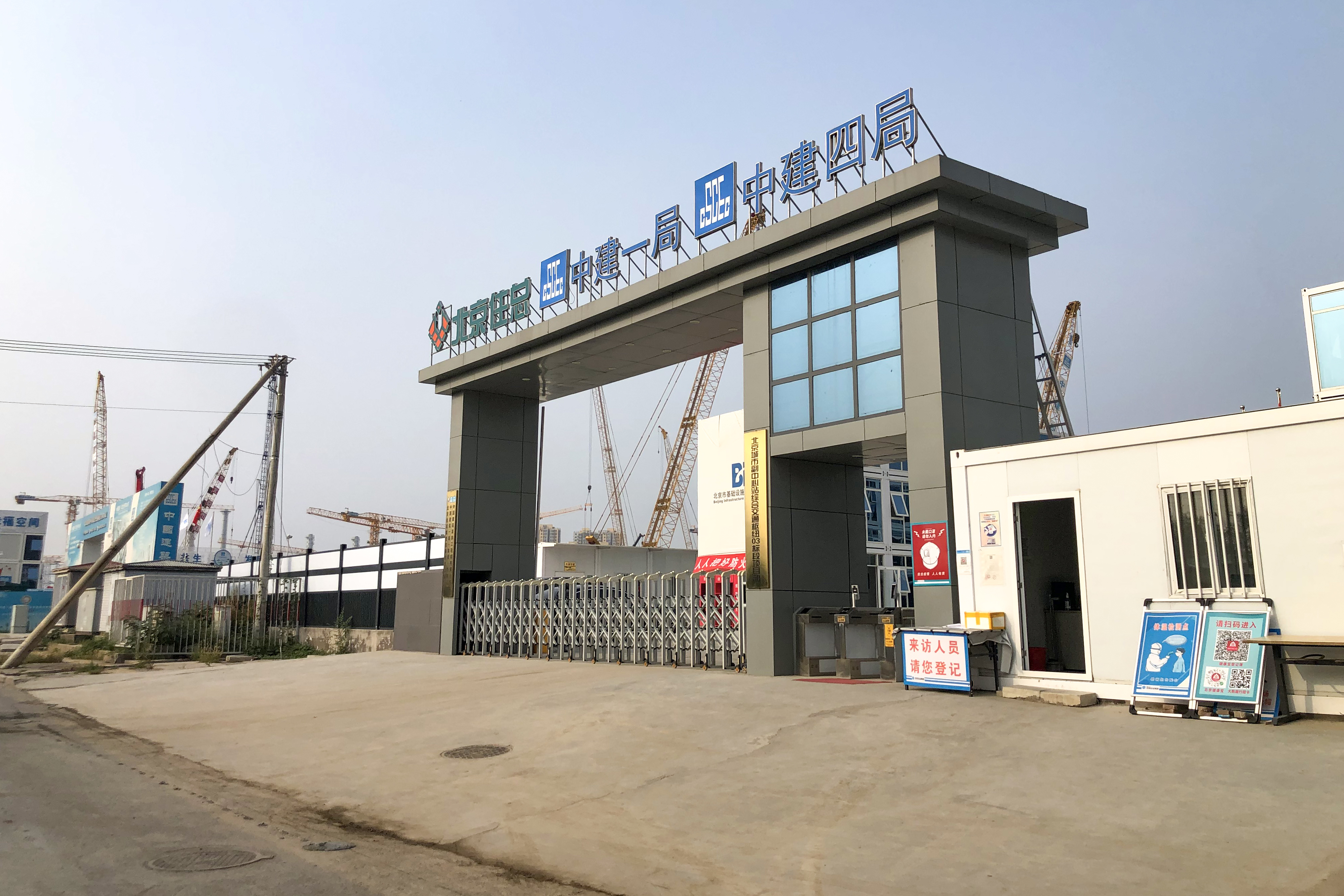
Construction site of Beijing MAC railway station

Beijing Tongzhou railway station (Chinese: 北京通州站; pinyin: Běijīng tōngzhōu zhàn), also known as Beijing Municipal Administrative Center railway station and Beijing Sub-Center railway station, is a railway station in Tongyun Subdistrict, Tongzhou District, Beijing. Construction of the Integrated Transportation Hub (ITH) started construction on 30 November 2019. It opened on 30 December 2025. It is the largest underground railway station in Asia.

The total site area of the Integrated Transport Hub is 70 hectares (170 acres), with a floorage of 2,230,000 square metres (24,000,000 sq ft) overground. The total investment of the Integrated Transport Hub is approximately 42.1 billion Renminbi.

This station and the ITH are designed by AREP, Beijing General Municipal Engineering Design & Research Institute, China Railway Design Corporation, and China Architecture Design Group.

== Future development ==
The Pinggu line of the Beijing Subway is currently under construction and is expected to open in late 2026.

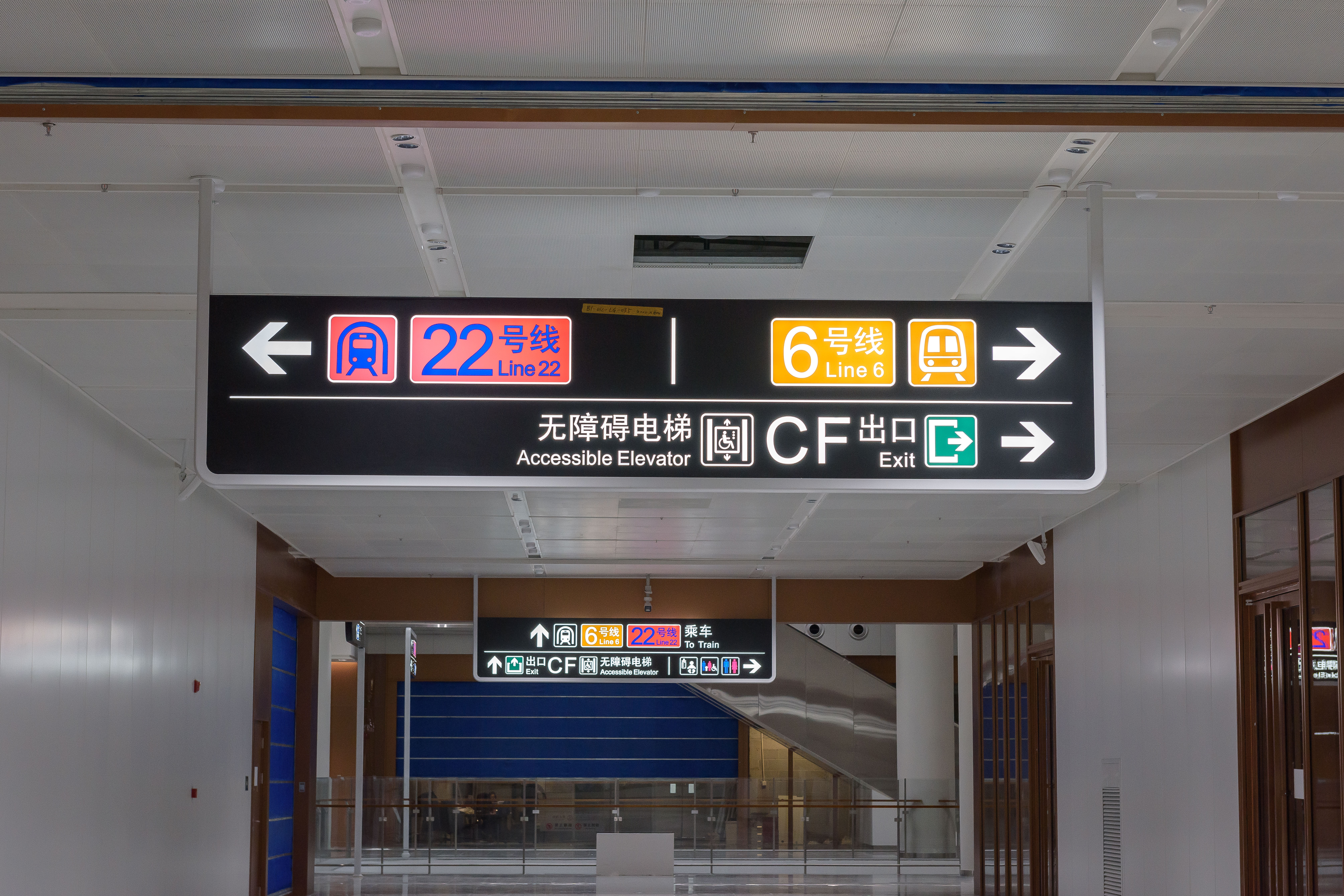
When Beijing Tongzhou railway station was opened, the sign for the Pinggu Line (Line 22) was already hung

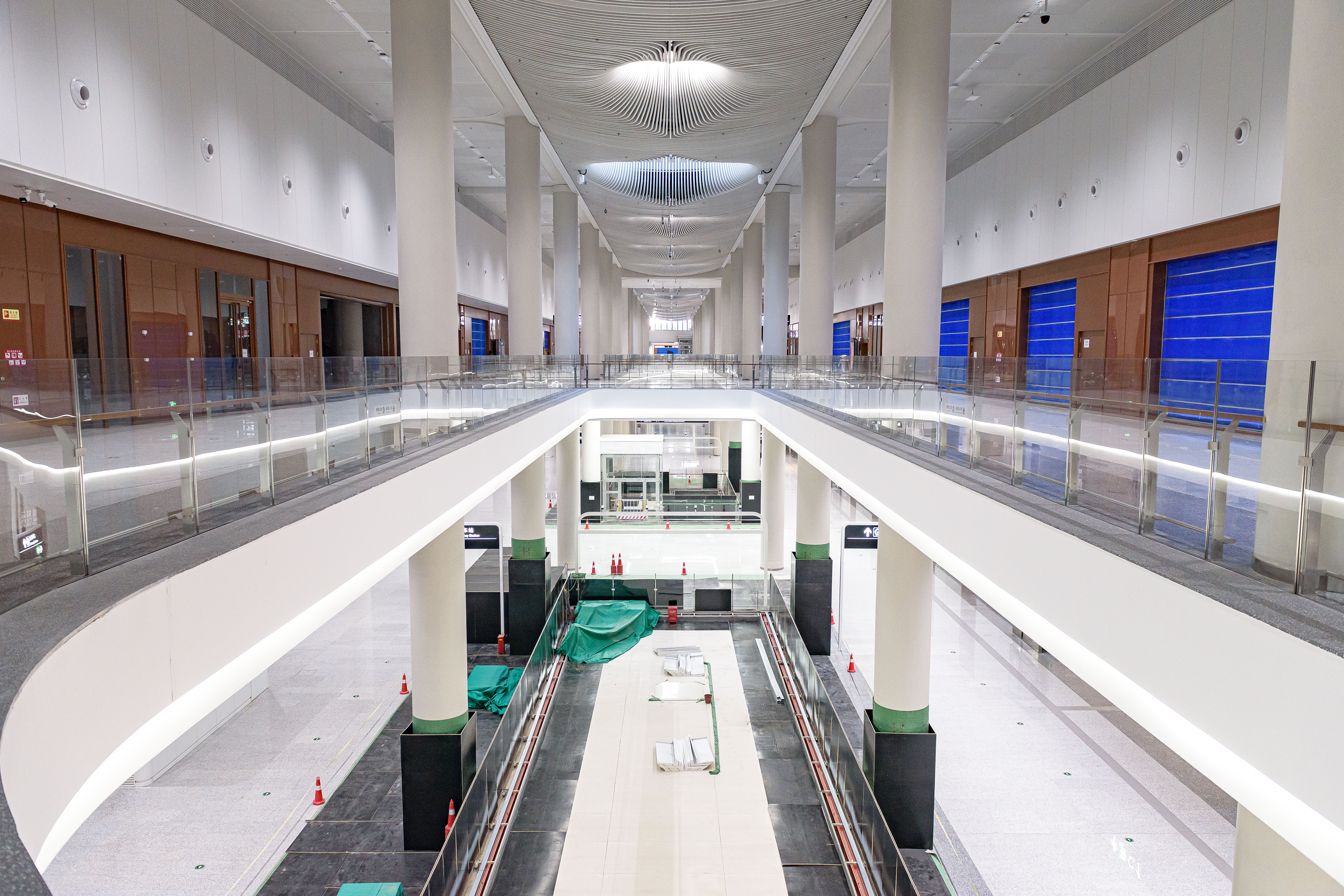
Pinggu Line station concourse

== See also ==
- Beijing–Tangshan intercity railway
- Beijing–Binhai intercity railway
