= Baodi railway station =

Railway station in Tianjin

Baodi 宝坻
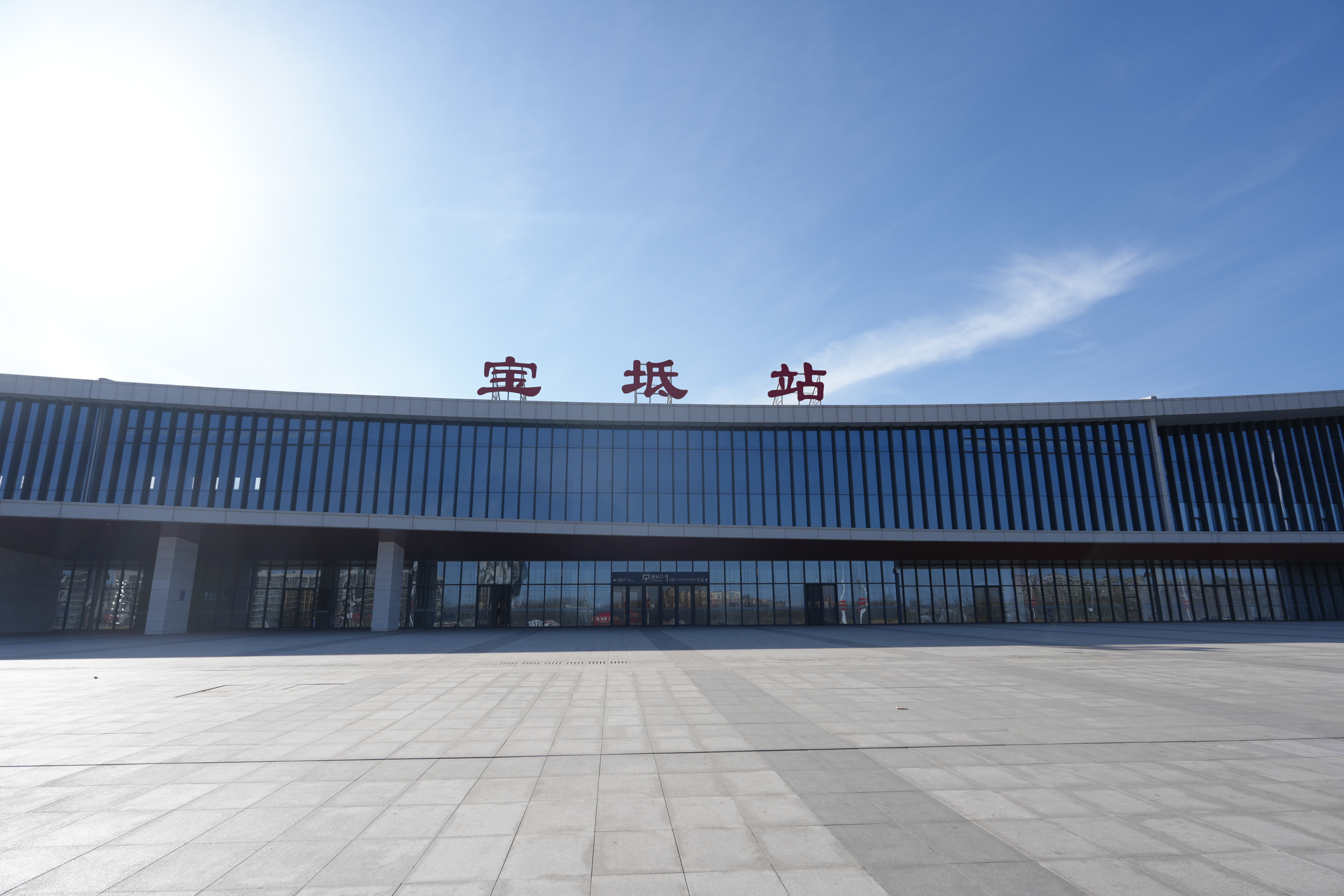

General information
- Location: Chaoyang Subdistrict, Baodi District, Tianjin; China
- Coordinates: 39°39′37.8″N 117°17′56.4″E
- Lines: Beijing–Tangshan intercity railway; Beijing–Binhai intercity railway

History
- Opened: 30 December 2022
Location

Baodi railway station (Chinese: 宝坻站; pinyin: Bǎodǐ zhàn) is a railway station in Baodi District, Tianjin, China. The station opened on 30 December 2022. The station has two island platforms and two side platforms for a total of six platform faces.

The station is on the Beijing–Tangshan intercity railway and the Beijing–Binhai intercity railway which share a set of tracks to the west. To the east of the station, the lines split and head for Tangshan and Binhai West respectively.

== Name ==
The station name Baodi was originally used for another station, but this was renamed Baodi North railway station on 30 August 2022.
