= Beijing–Tangshan intercity railway =

Railway line in China

Beijing–Tangshan intercity railway 京唐城际铁路

Overview
- Status: Operational
- Locale: Beijing; Hebei; Tianjin
- Termini: Beijing Tongzhou (2025) Beijing(via connecting line); Tangshan
- Stations: 9

Service
- Type: High-speed rail
- Operator(s): China Railway Beijing Group

History
- Opened: 30 December 2022

Technical
- Line length: 163 km (101 mi)
- Track gauge: 1,435 mm (4 ft 8 1/2 in) standard gauge
- Operating speed: 350 km/h (217 mph)

Beijing–Tangshan intercity railway
- Simplified Chinese: 京唐城际铁路
- Traditional Chinese: 京唐城際鐵路
Transcriptions
Standard Mandarin
- Hanyu Pinyin: Jīng-Táng Chéngjì Tiělù

Beijing–Tangshan intercity railway is a high-speed railway connecting Beijing and Tangshan in eastern Hebei. The railway opened on 30 December 2022.

From Beijing railway station to Baodi railway station, the Beijing–Binhai intercity railway will share its northern segment with the Beijing–Tangshan intercity railway before continuing southeast-ward to Binhai West railway station.

== Overview ==
The railway begins at the Beijing Tongzhou railway station opened in 2025, while some trains depart from Beijing railway station via Beijing–Harbin Railway and connecting railway in the west of Yanjiao Station. And then it crossing into Hebei's Xianghe County. Next it crosses Tianjin's Baodi District to re-enter Hebei at Tangshan City's Yutian County and Fengrun District. Finally, it will terminate at Tangshan railway station. Total line length of will be approximately 163 km (101 mi), with a total of 8 stations and a design speed of 350 km/h (220 mph).

== History ==
Construction on the railway was originally scheduled to start in 2009 but the completion has been delayed after a nationwide rail review following the 2011 Wenzhou Rail Incident. Construction was eventually started on 29 December 2015. The railway opened on 30 December 2022.

== Stations ==
Station Name	Chinese	Total distance (km)	Travel Time	High-speed rail & local rail transfers	Metro transfers	Platforms	Tracks served by platform	Location	
Beijing	北京	0	0		2			Beijing	Dongcheng
Beijing Tongzhou	北京通州				( 6 via Beiyunhedong)			Beijing	Tongzhou
Yanjiao	燕郊								
Dachang	大厂								
Xianghe	香河								
Baodi	宝坻			Beijing–Binhai intercity railway Tianjin–Chengde intercity railway (planned)					
Yutian South	玉田南								
Tangshan West	唐山西								
Tangshan	唐山								
