= BHX =

BHX may refer to:

- Birmingham Airport, England (IATA airport code)
- BinHex, a binary-to-text encoding system
- Binhai West railway station, China Railway pinyin code BHX
