= Guye railway station =

Railway station in Tangshan, Hebei

Guye 古冶

General information
- Location: Guye District, Tangshan, Hebei; China
- Coordinates: 39.720523°N 118.411962°E
- Line: Qidaoqiao–Luanxian railway
Location

Guye railway station (Chinese: 古冶站) is a railway station in Guye District, Tangshan, Hebei, China. It is an intermediate stop on the Qidaoqiao–Luanxian railway.

== History ==
Built in 1889.

Passenger services were discontinued in 1995.

A passenger service was restored on 18 January 2018 with a shuttle service. There are five trains to and from Tangshan South railway station. To facilitate this service, the Guye District Committee and District Government invested 4.2 million yuan to renovate the station's platforms, station square, waiting room, and install lighting and surveillance equipment.

All passenger trains serving this station were suspended from July 1, 2023.
