= Tongyun Men station =

Rapid transit station in Beijing, China

Tongyun Men 通运门
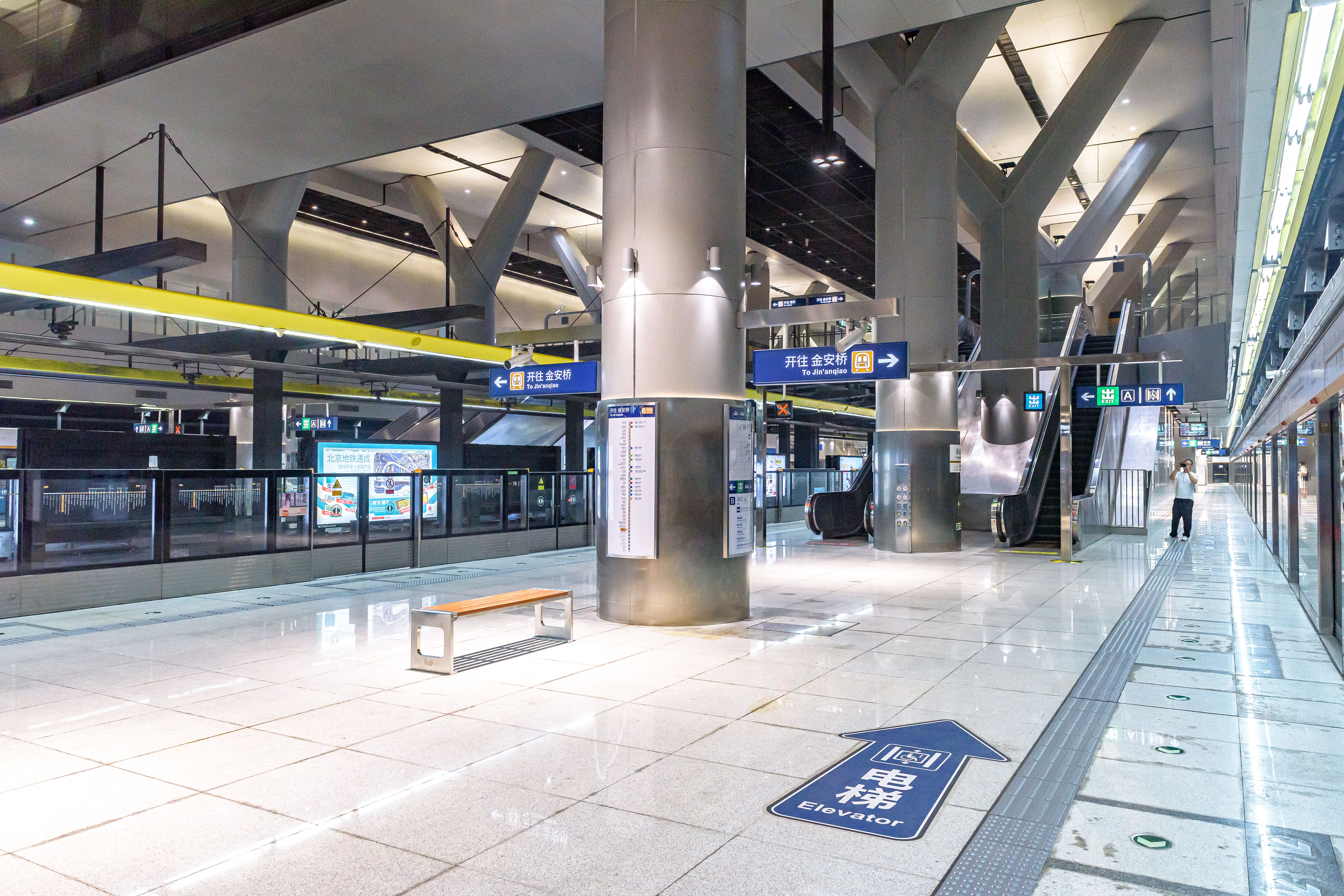
- Westbound platform

Chinese name
- Simplified Chinese: 通运门站
- Traditional Chinese: 通運門站
Transcriptions
Standard Mandarin
- Hanyu Pinyin: Tōngyùn Mén zhàn

General information
- Location: Intersection of Tongsheng South Road (通盛南路) and Tuba North Street (土坝北街); Canal Business District, Xinhua Subdistrict, Tongzhou District, Beijing; China
- Coordinates: 39°54′35″N 116°40′03″E
- Operator: Beijing Mass Transit Railway Operation Corp., Ltd
- Line: Line 6 (U/C)
- Platforms: 4 (2 island platforms)
- Tracks: 4

Construction
- Structure type: Underground
- Accessible: Yes

History
- Opened: June 30, 2026; 55 days ago
- Former names: Xinhua Dajie (新华大街)

Services
Preceding station	Beijing Subway	Following station
Tongzhou Beiguan towards Jin'anqiao	Line 6	Beiyunhexi towards Luyang
Location
- Location within Beijing

Tongyun Men station (Chinese: 通运门站; pinyin: Tōngyùn Mén Zhàn) is a station on Line 6 of the Beijing Subway. Construction began on September 20, 2012. The station opened on June 30, 2026.

== Location and design ==
Tongyun Men station is located at the intersection of Tongsheng South Road (通盛南路) and Tuba North Street (土坝北街), in Xinhua Subdistrict, Tongzhou District, Beijing. The station was named after Tongyun Gate.

During construction of the station, the Tongzhou East Gate (also known as "Tongyun Gate") city gate and barbican ruins were unearthed. As a result, the design of the subway station was changed, and the Tongyun Gate Ruins Museum (also known as the Wengcheng Ruins Park Museum) was added on the south side and connected to the subway station. During construction, the city wall was cut and moved away. After the subway station construction was completed, it was moved back to its original site for display.

The station is a two-level underground station, with an atrium above the platforms connecting the two island platforms. The roof slab is supported by Y-shaped steel columns.

== Station layout ==
The station has an underground dual-island platform.

== History ==
Due to construction delays, the station could not open on December 28, 2014, along with Phase II of Line 6. All Line 6 trains passed via the outer track at approximately 75 km/h without stopping at this station. Starting March 31, 2020, Line 6 began operating express trains during peak hours, bypassing the station. Local trains would temporarily stop at the inner track of the station, but during these stops, the doors would not open, and passengers would not be allowed to board or alight.

As of December 2021, the station's platforms had largely completed interior decoration, but the entrances/exits still needed to be integrated with the Canal Business District. According to the Tongzhou New Town Central Area Construction and Management Committee, the opening date of the station remained uncertain because the Wengcheng Ruins Park project to the west has not yet begun construction. It will only open to the public after the surrounding ground construction is completed. On February 25, 2026, the city's sub-center held a press conference announcing that the station would officially open on June 30, at which time the Wengcheng Ruins Park would be put into use along with the station.

== Exits ==
There will be 4 exits, lettered A, B, C, and D. Only 2 exits are scheduled to open in 2026.
