= Binhai North railway station =

Railway station in Tianjin, China

Coordinates: 39°14′10″N 117°45′44″E

Binhaibei 滨海北
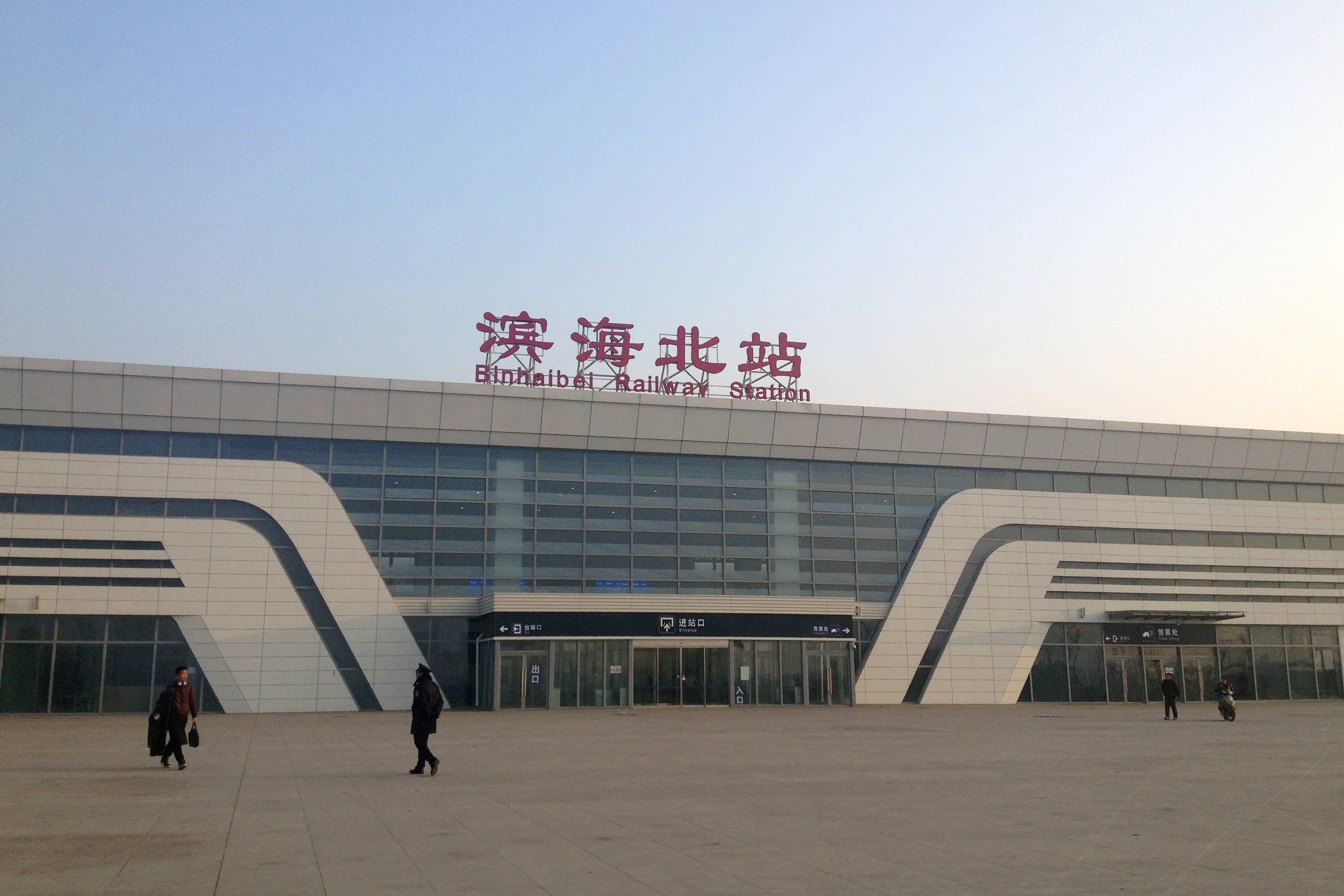

General information
- Location: Binhai New Area, Tianjin; China
- Operator: Beijing Railway Bureau; China Railway Corporation
- Line: Tianjin–Qinhuangdao high-speed railway

History
- Opened: 1 December 2013
Location

Binhai North railway station (simplified Chinese: 滨海北站; traditional Chinese: 濱海北站; pinyin: Bīnhǎiběi Zhàn) is a railway station on the Tianjin–Qinhuangdao high-speed railway in Binhai New Area, Tianjin.

The Tianjin–Shanhaiguan railway passes close to this station, but does not stop here.

Preceding station	China Railway High-speed	Following station
Binhai West towards Tianjin West	Tianjin–Qinhuangdao high-speed railway	Tangshan towards Qinhuangdao
