= M101 =

M101 or M-101 most often refers to:

- Messier 101, or the Pinwheel Galaxy, a spiral galaxy
- M101 howitzer, a 105 mm light howitzer

M101 or M-101 may also refer to:

- Myasishchev M-101T Gzhel, an aircraft produced in Russia
- Line M101 (Beijing Subway), a metro line under construction in Beijing, scheduled to open in 2027
- M101 (New York City bus), a bus route in Manhattan
- Hammond Organ, a Hammond Spinet Organ
- M-101 (Michigan highway), a state highway in Michigan
- HMS Sandown (M101), British naval ship commissioned in 1989, decommissioned in 2005.
- M101 CROWS, USA Common Remotely Operated Weapon Station
- M101 railway (Croatia), a railway line in Croatia
