= Baodi North railway station =

Railway station in Tianjin

Baodi North 宝坻北
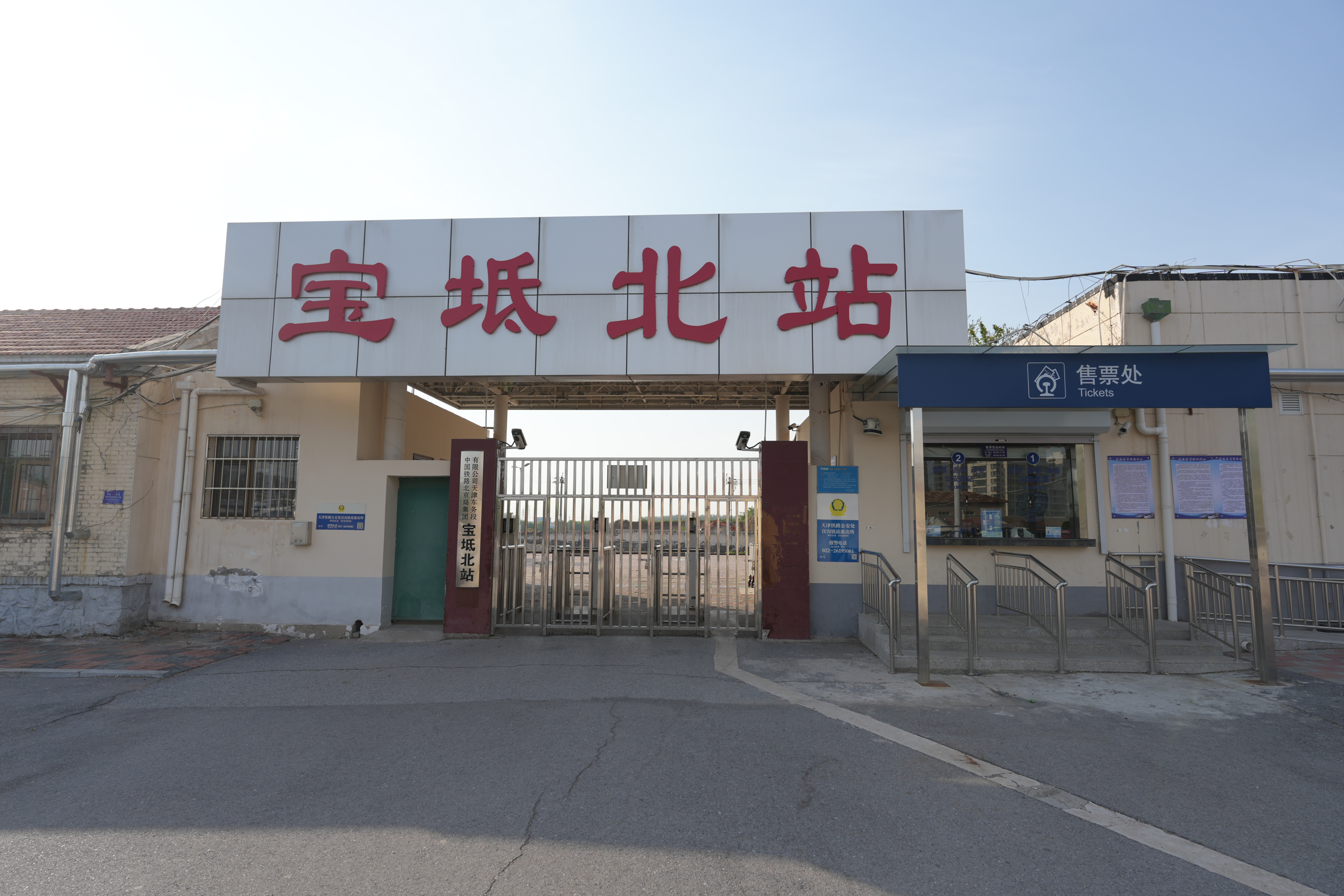
- Baodi North Railway Station Exit

General information
- Location: Yuhua Subdistrict, Baodi District, Tianjin; China
- Coordinates: 39.714034°N 117.329393°E
- Line: Tianjin–Jizhou railway

History
- Opened: 1965
Location

Baodi North railway station (Chinese: 宝坻北站; pinyin: Bǎodǐběi zhàn) is a railway station in Yuhua Subdistrict, Baodi District, Tianjin, China. It is an intermediate stop on the Tianjin–Jizhou railway and was opened in 1965. The station was originally named Baodi but was renamed Baodi North on 30 August 2022, before the opening of the new Baodi railway station in late 2022.
