= Yanjiao railway station =

Railway station in Langfang, Hebei

Yanjiao 燕郊
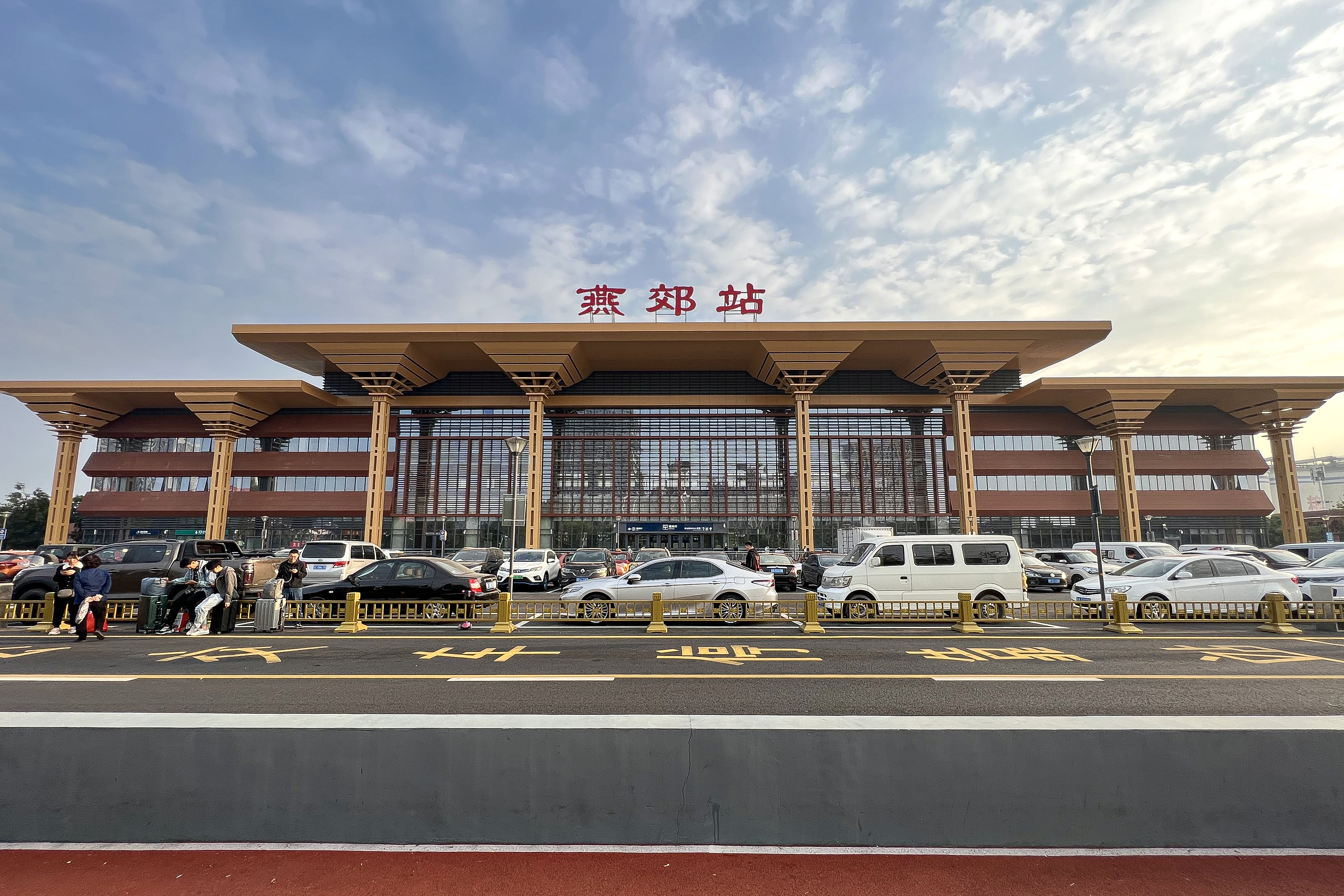
- Exterior of the station in 2023

General information
- Location: Yanjiao, Sanhe, Langfang, Hebei; China
- Coordinates: 39.9405°N 116.8198°E
- Line(s): Beijing–Qinhuangdao railway Beijing–Tangshan intercity railway

History
- Opened: 1981

Yanjiao railway station (Chinese: 燕郊站; pinyin: Yānjiāo zhàn) is a railway station in Yanjiao, Sanhe, Langfang, Hebei, China. It is on the Beijing–Qinhuangdao railway and Beijing–Tangshan intercity railway.

== History ==
The station opened in 1981. In April 2021, reconstruction of the station began as part of the Beijing–Tangshan intercity railway project.

Preceding station	China Railway	Following station
Tongzhou towards Beijing	Beijing–Qinhuangdao railway	Sanhexian towards Qinhuangdao
