= Caofeidian East railway station =

Railway station in Hebei, China

Caofeidian East 曹妃甸东

General information
- Location: Caofeidian District, Tangshan, Hebei; China
- Coordinates: 39°13′1.88″N 118°35′4.28″E
- Operated by: China Railway
- Line: Tangshan–Caofeidian railway

History
- Opened: 28 December 2018
Location

Caofeidian railway station is a railway station in Caofeidian District, Tangshan, Hebei, China.

Passenger services to Tangshan started on 28 December 2018. A service to Beijing was introduced on 21 August 2019.
