= Caofeidian, Tangshan =

Caofeidian 曹妃甸区
- District
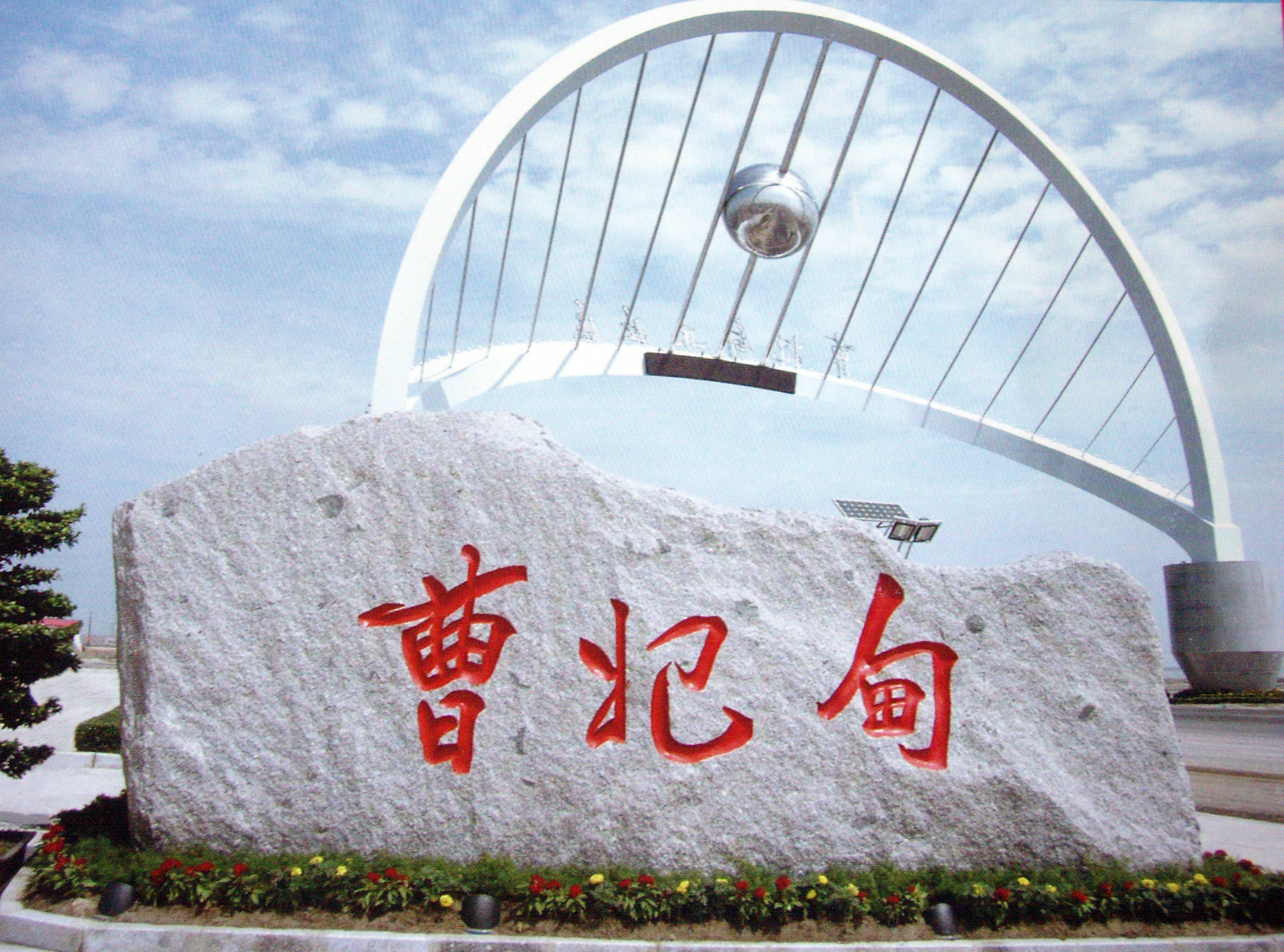

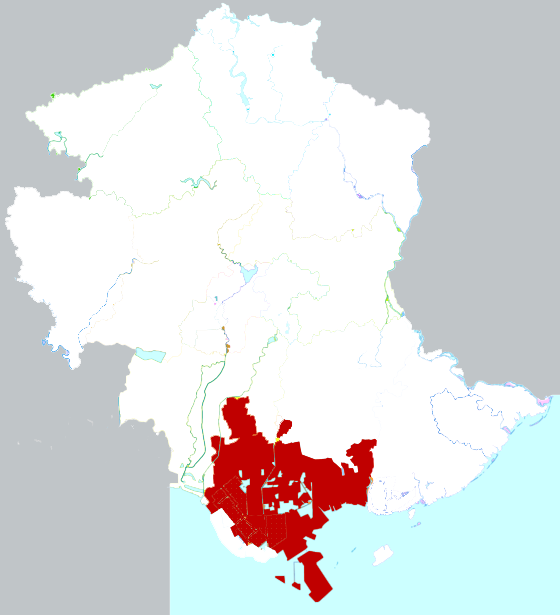
- Location of the county within Tangshan

- Location in Hebei
- Coordinates: 39°16′23″N 118°27′36″E
- Country: People's Republic of China
- Province: Hebei
- Prefecture-level city: Tangshan
- Township-level divisions: 3 towns
- Seat: Tanghai

Area
  - Total: 725 km^{2} (280 sq mi)
- Elevation: 4 m (13 ft)

Population (2020 census)
  - Total: 352,100
  - Density: 486/km^{2} (1,260/sq mi)
- Time zone: UTC+8 (China Standard)
- Postal code: 063200
- Area code: 0315
- Website: Caofeidian District People's Government

Caofeidian District (simplified Chinese: 曹妃甸区; traditional Chinese: 曹妃甸區; pinyin: Cáofēidiān Qū), formerly known as Tanghai County (唐海县; 唐海縣; Tánghǎi Xiàn), is a newly developed district located in Tangshan in the Bohai Sea coastal area of Hebei Province, China. The district spans an area of 1,595 square kilometres (616 mi^{2}), and has a population of about 352,100 as of 2020.

The district is rapidly urbanizing and was declared an important area for development by the Chinese government in the eleventh Five-Year Plan due to its strategic location in the Jing-Jin-Ji region and its proximity to the Bohai Sea. Caofeidian serves as a crucial shipping port for neighboring cities like Beijing and supports heavy industries such as manufacturing and steelworks.

The district has gained recent attention due to its role as the site of the Caofeidian Eco-City, which aimed to combat the effects of urbanization, promote sustainable living, and offset the environmental impact of neighboring heavy industry. However, the project has faced several challenges and delays in its implementation.

== Toponymy ==
Caofeidian was named after Caofei Temple (Chinese: 曹妃庙; pinyin: Cáofēi Miào; lit. 'Cao concubine Temple').

== History ==
The area of present-day Caofeidian District used to be a sandy island formed by alluvial runoff from the Luan River. The island has existed for at least 5,000 years. Throughout the Yuan, Ming, and Qing dynasties, the area of present-day Caofeidian District was a major salt producing area.

As of the early years of the Republic of China the area was divided between Fengrun County (present-day Fengrun District) and Luan County (present-day Luanzhou).

In 1941, invading Japanese forces established a farm focused in part on land reclamation in the area.

=== People's Republic of China ===
After the surrender of Japan in 1945, the People's Liberation Army established farming offices in the area. The area remained a hodgepodge of farms and zones devoted to land reclamation for nearly 40 years. In 1982, part of the area was reorganized as Tanghai County (Chinese: 唐海县; pinyin: Tánghǎi Xiàn).

Reform and opening up permitted foreign investment in Tianjin in 1984, creating an industrial production boom in surrounding cities, including Tangshan. Efforts to reduce pollution in nearby Beijing in advance of the 2008 Summer Olympics prompted the movement of heavy industry out of Beijing, with land reclamation commencing in 2000 to support the transfer of the Shougang Group steel and iron production facilities from Beijing's core. These facilities were relocated to present-day Caofeidian District over the period 2005 to 2010.

Reclamation transformed the small island south of Tangshan into the much larger peninsula that became Caofeidian District. Reclamation was selected as a cheaper and less disruptive alternative compared to the relocation of existing rural communities, which would have otherwise been required given the region's density.

Caofeidian District was announced as a key project in the Eleventh Five-Year Plan, prompting additional growth of heavy industry in the district. In 2003, the Caofeidian Port was constructed to further promote industry growth, increasing capacity to support large ships up to 300K tons. Economic growth initiated a focus on urbanization to house the necessary workforce, with Caofeidian being selected as the location of one of the first eco-cities in China in 2005.

In October 2008, the Hebei provincial government approved the creation of Caofeidian New District. On March 14, 2009, Caofeidian New District was created, although it remained under the jurisdiction of Fengnan District and Tanghai County. Caofeidian New District was composed of three primary subdivisions: the Caofeidian Eco-City, Caofeidian Industrial Area, and the Caofeidian Port, along with several divisions mostly made up of farms.

On July 11, 2012, the State Council approved the abolition of Tanghai County, and the promotion of Caofeidian New District to district status.

The Caofeidian East Railway Station connects the district to the broader region, with passenger service to Tangshan starting in 2018 and to Beijing in 2019.

== Geography ==
Caofeidian District is located in the center of the Bohai Rim, 80 kilometres (50 mi) from the center of Tangshan, 120 kilometres (75 mi) from Tianjin, 170 kilometres (110 mi) from Qinhuangdao, and 220 kilometres (140 mi) from Beijing. The district is 400 nautical miles from Incheon, 680 nautical miles from Nagasaki, and 935 nautical miles from Kobe.

=== Climate ===
Caofeidian District lies in a temperate semi-humid continental climate. The average temperature is 11 °C (51.8 °F) and the district experiences 600-900mm of rainfall per year.

Coastal land reclamation has made the district more vulnerable to the impacts of climate change. The region is arid, and the area faces water supply challenges.

Climate data for Caofeidian, elevation 3 m (9.8 ft), (1991–2020 normals, extremes 1981–2025)
Month	Jan	Feb	Mar	Apr	May	Jun	Jul	Aug	Sep	Oct	Nov	Dec	Year
Record high °C (°F)	12.2 (54.0)	16.4 (61.5)	28.0 (82.4)	30.0 (86.0)	34.3 (93.7)	36.3 (97.3)	38.7 (101.7)	36.5 (97.7)	34.0 (93.2)	31.5 (88.7)	20.7 (69.3)	13.4 (56.1)	38.7 (101.7)
Mean daily maximum °C (°F)	1.1 (34.0)	4.4 (39.9)	10.8 (51.4)	18.4 (65.1)	24.4 (75.9)	27.7 (81.9)	29.8 (85.6)	29.5 (85.1)	25.9 (78.6)	18.9 (66.0)	9.9 (49.8)	2.8 (37.0)	17.0 (62.5)
Daily mean °C (°F)	−3.8 (25.2)	−0.8 (30.6)	5.6 (42.1)	13.1 (55.6)	19.3 (66.7)	23.3 (73.9)	26.0 (78.8)	25.4 (77.7)	20.9 (69.6)	13.6 (56.5)	5.0 (41.0)	−1.7 (28.9)	12.2 (53.9)
Mean daily minimum °C (°F)	−7.8 (18.0)	−4.8 (23.4)	1.4 (34.5)	8.6 (47.5)	14.8 (58.6)	19.5 (67.1)	22.8 (73.0)	22.0 (71.6)	16.7 (62.1)	9.1 (48.4)	1.1 (34.0)	−5.2 (22.6)	8.2 (46.7)
Record low °C (°F)	−22.8 (−9.0)	−18.4 (−1.1)	−11.6 (11.1)	−2.9 (26.8)	4.4 (39.9)	9.0 (48.2)	15.9 (60.6)	13.5 (56.3)	3.1 (37.6)	−6.1 (21.0)	−12.1 (10.2)	−16.9 (1.6)	−22.8 (−9.0)
Average precipitation mm (inches)	2.6 (0.10)	5.0 (0.20)	6.5 (0.26)	21.2 (0.83)	45.5 (1.79)	81.3 (3.20)	152.9 (6.02)	133.6 (5.26)	50.5 (1.99)	31.8 (1.25)	12.7 (0.50)	3.9 (0.15)	547.5 (21.55)
Average precipitation days (≥ 0.1 mm)	1.5	2.2	2.9	4.8	6.3	8.8	10.0	9.6	5.9	4.6	2.9	2.3	61.8
Average snowy days	3.0	2.9	1.2	0.2	0	0	0	0	0	0	1.8	3.0	12.1
Average relative humidity (%)	59	59	56	56	60	71	79	80	73	67	64	61	65
Mean monthly sunshine hours	175.8	177.8	233.1	250.4	275.0	243.5	212.4	220.3	224.7	211.1	173.2	167.2	2,564.5
Percentage possible sunshine	58	58	63	63	62	55	47	53	61	62	58	57	58
Source: China Meteorological Administration

== Administrative divisions ==
Caofeidian District administers 3 towns, 12 township-level farms, and 4 other township-level divisions.

The district's 3 towns are Tanghai, Binhai, and Liuzan.

The district's 12 township-level farms are Caofeidian District First Farm, Caofeidian District Third Farm, Caofeidian District Fourth Farm, Caofeidian District Fifth Farm, Caofeidian District Sixth Farm, Caofeidian District Seventh Farm, Caofeidian District Eighth Farm, Caofeidian District Ninth Farm, Caofeidian District Tenth Farm, Caofeidian District Eleventh Farm, Balitan Breeding Farm, and Shilihai Breeding Farm.

The district's 4 other township-level divisions are Tangshan International Tourism Island (Chinese: 唐山国际旅游岛), Nanpu Economic Development Zone, Caofeidian Industrial Zone, and Caofeidian New City (Chinese: 曹妃甸新城).

== Demographics ==
Caofeidian District had a population of 352,100 as of 2021. A 2012 population estimate put the district's population at 270,000.

== Economy ==
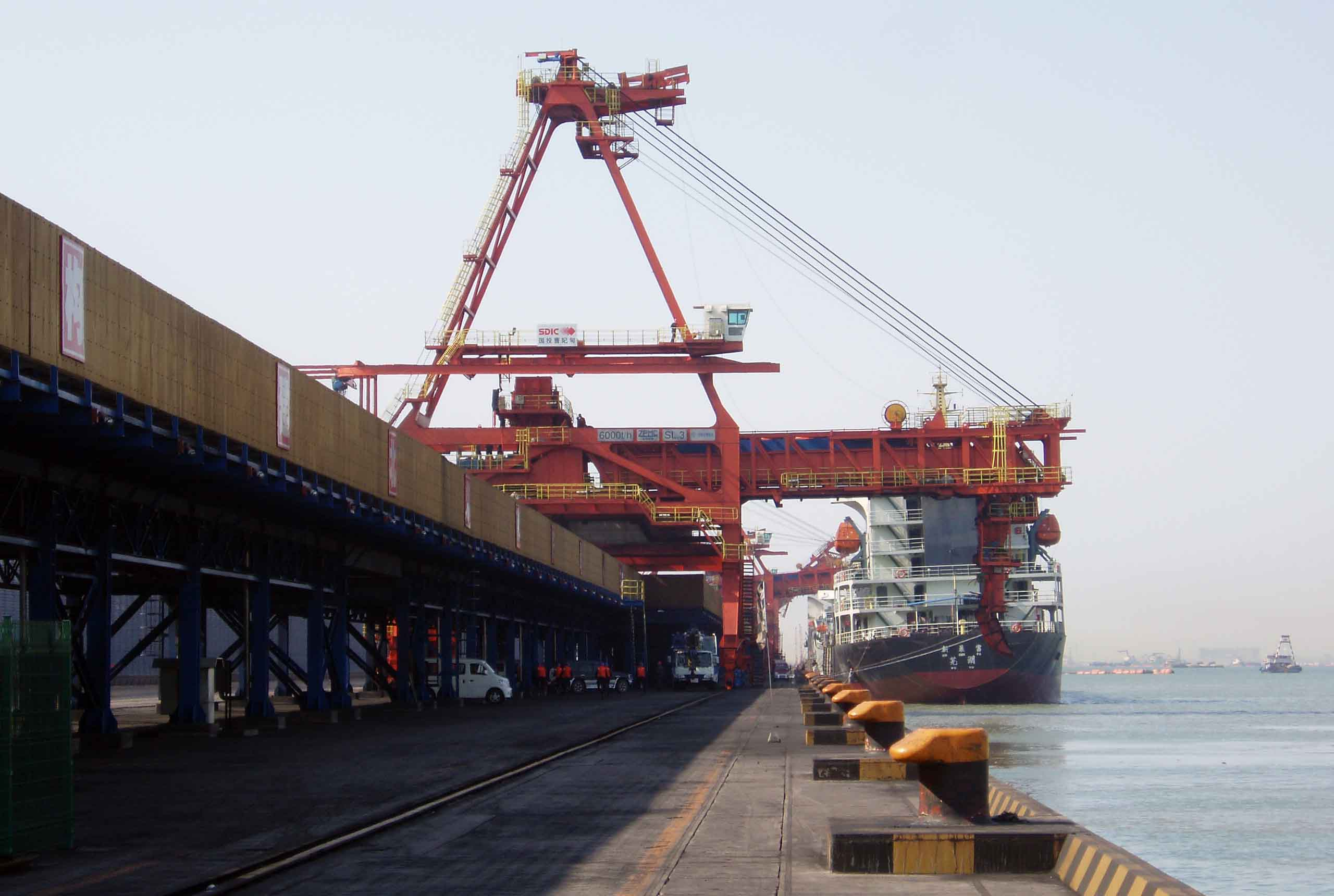
Caofeidian Port

Caofeidian's economy is dependent on shipping and heavy industry, particularly coal, steel, chemical manufacturing, and oil, with many of these industries relocated to the area from Beijing.

The district's strategic location allows it to serve as a connection for the nearby cities of Beijing and Tianjin to the Bohai Sea, making it an important port and industrial zone in the Jing-Jin-Ji region and a major economic growth center for Tangshan and Heibei. The port is one of the largest in China by cargo output and serves as a domestic and international trade hub, primarily supporting energy and ore.

In 2019, the district was approved as a free-trade zone.

== Eco-City ==
=== Background ===
The Caofeidian Eco-City, also known as the Tangshan Bay Eco-City, is a planned sustainable city located in the Caofeidian District. In 2005, the Chinese government selected the site as a national demonstration project for a circular economy. The selection was based on its proximity to four of the ten most polluted cities in China and the district's reliance on heavy industry and steel production, which are significant sources of pollution in the region.

Planning commenced in 2007, with the aim of promoting sustainable resource use and energy efficiency to offset the neighboring industrial zones through various efforts including recycling industrial waste heat for use as a heating source and land reclamation to improve environmental conditions of the area's tidal land.

The project was part of a broader movement of eco-cities in China, where rapid urbanization has prompted the development of over 100 similar projects, with Caofeidian Eco-City serving as one of the first. The project's objectives included reducing emissions and energy consumption, as well as accommodating the rapidly growing urban population in the country.

=== Concept ===
The new development's concept included several sustainability measures to address the environmental challenges faced by the surrounding industrial zones. It was intended to be a model for other eco-cities in China and around the world, with its design aimed at reducing emissions, energy consumption, and promoting sustainable resource use and energy efficiency. City performance was planned to be monitored through 141 indicators to measure the success of these efforts.

The city was designed to house up to 500,000 residents by 2016 and eventually one million residents, with several measures planned to reduce the ecological impact of residents.

Planning included projects to alleviate water challenges, including the use of recycled water and desalination plants to meet 50% of the city's water needs and reuse 100% of domestic water usage. Renewable energy was planned to account for over half of energy consumption, powered by solar, natural gas, wind, and geothermal production.

City design featured mixed-use development supported by a bus network supplemented by light rail, with the aim of promoting transit and walkability, targeting 90% of transportation needs met through sustainable transportation.

Amenities included government offices, business centers, industrial factories, housing, parks, and a wetland area. Other features included a waste recycling system and affordable housing.

=== Implementation and challenges ===
Initially, the Caofeidian Eco-City was intended to be a joint venture between China and Singapore, but the bid was lost to the Tianjin Eco-City located just to the South. Nevertheless, local officials independently financed the development, and construction began in 2008 with a targeted completion date of 2020. The estimated cost of the project was US$15B.

Planning for the eco-city was a joint venture with Sweden, which contributed its expertise and experience in eco-city planning. The Swedish design firm Sweco assisted in the planning and drew inspiration from eco-cities in Malmö and Hammarby.

Funding challenges have delayed construction of the project, which has been described by one observer as "essentially bankrupt." The high cost of land reclamation required significant investments, but the local government struggled to find sufficient funding and resorted to financing the project itself. The lack of amenities and the district's heavy industry-based economy instead of high-tech office jobs made it difficult to attract residents and investors. As a result, the eco-city has been criticized as a "ghost city," with many buildings remaining unfinished, and numerous residences and commercial spaces remaining empty.

In 2019, Caofeidian District was approved as a free trade zone, spurring renewed investment and the resumption of construction on some projects. However, the eco-city remained incomplete as of 2020 and its future remains uncertain.

=== Criticism ===
As one of the first eco-city projects in China, Caofeidian has been the subject of several case studies on the implementation of eco-cities.

The construction process has been criticized as being environmentally harmful. The use of land reclamation has been seen as detrimental to the marine and coastal environment. Emissions from construction, which are not calculated in the city's eco-indicators, may offset the benefits of a sustainable city. Some researchers have also argued that repurposing existing cities could have provided greater benefits.

The city's eco-indicators have also been criticized as insufficient. For instance, the goal of reducing per capita domestic water consumption is only slightly better than other Chinese cities.

One study described the eco-city as an "eco-enclave" with limited impact on the surrounding area. The emissions savings from the city have been considered insufficient to offset Caofeidian's carbon-intensive heavy industry as well as the wider region's development.

Critics have also noted a disconnect with the local community. The use of Western architectural styles rather than influences from Chinese culture and the top-down planning style may not build buy-in from residents. Further, residents may not be properly educated on how to use technologies implemented in city development, which could negate their presence.

== Transportation ==
Major railroads that run through the district include the Beijing–Shanhaiguan railway, the Beijing–Qinhuangdao railway, and the Qian'an–Caofeidian railway.
