= Caofeidian =

Economic development zone in China

Coordinates: 38°56′00″N 118°32′00″E

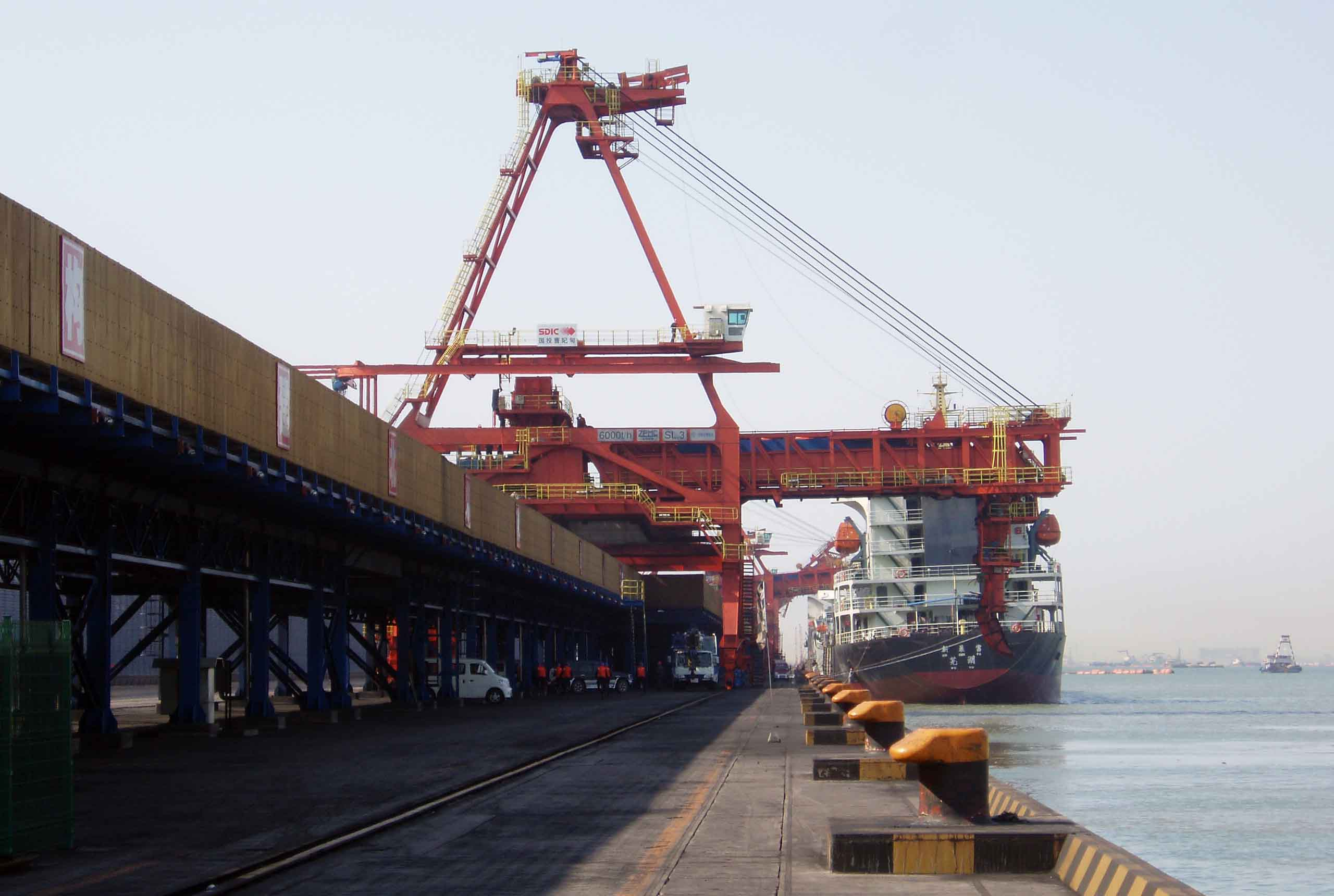
Caofeidian Ore Port

Caofeidian (Chinese: 曹妃甸; pinyin: Cáofēidiàn) is a land reclamation-converted economic development zone in Bohai Bay located in the eponymous district of Tangshan, Hebei Province, China.

It hosts a large coal and ore discharging port, which forms one of the prime ports of Northern China, namely (from South to North) Tianjin - Jingtang port - Caofeidian - Qinhuangdao - Yingkou - Bayuquan - Dalian). Caofedian and Jingtang ports are often referred together as Tangshan port, though Tangshan is actually a large inland city away from the shore.

The area is served by the Tangshan–Caofeidian railway.

== Location ==
The island is 200 km from Beijing, the island spans 60 km^{2} and is a 2005-listed pilot area for the development of a Recyclable/Circular Economy (Industrial ecology) in China. Huadian Power and PetroChina have some of their energy bases there. The island is expected to have a population of 300,000 by 2010.

Caofeidian is 80 km from Tangshan city centre.

== See also ==
- Caofeidian District
- Geography of China
- Zhao Yong
- List of islands by area
- List of islands of China
