= Line M101 (Beijing Subway) =

Metro line under construction in Beijing, China

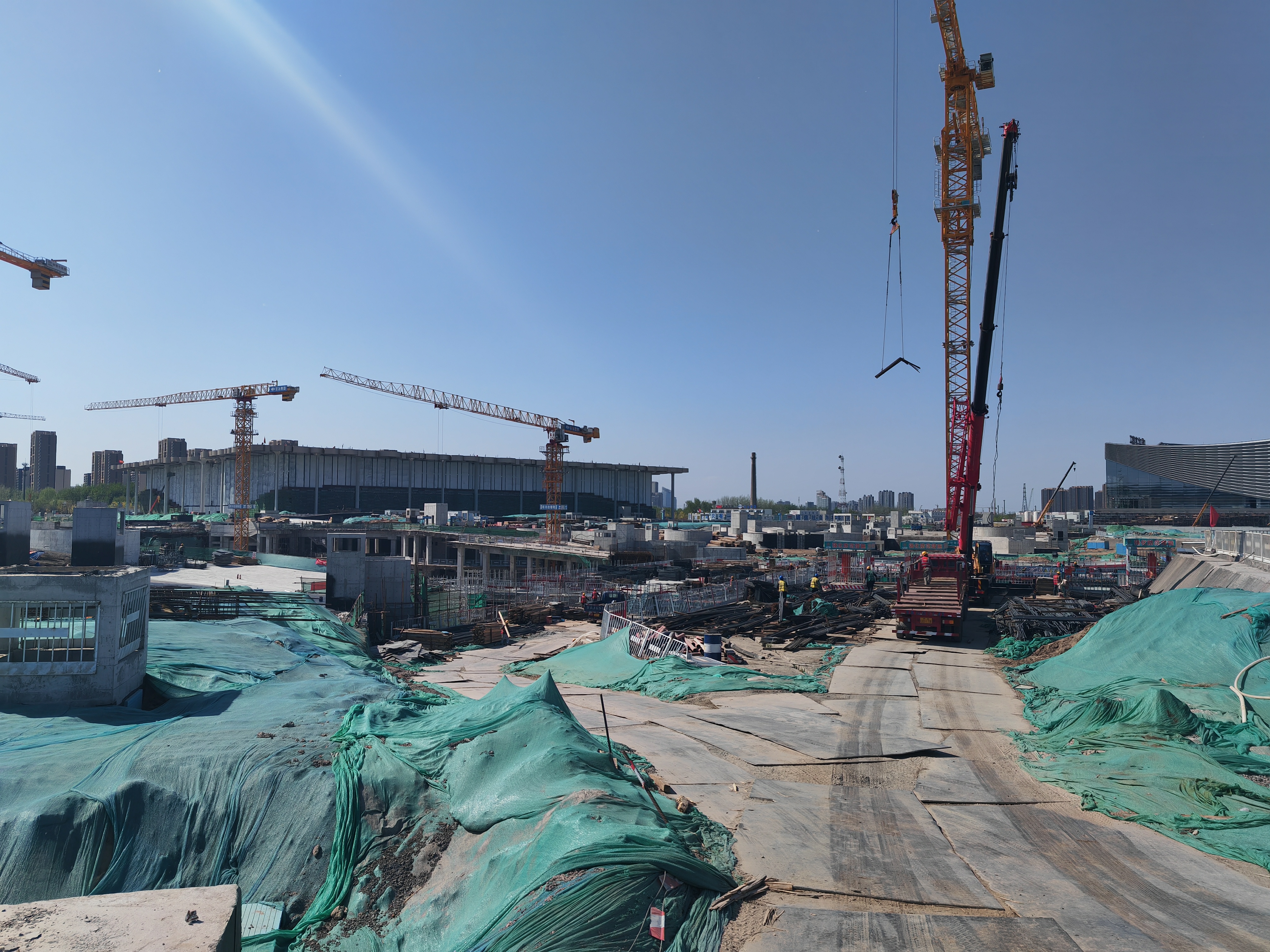
- Construction site of Beijing Dajuyuan station

Overview
- Status: Under construction
- Locale: Tongzhou district Beijing
- Termini: Shangwuyuan; Zhangjiawandong
- Stations: 14

Service
- Type: Rapid Transit
- System: Beijing Subway
- Operator(s): Beijing MTR Corp. Ltd.
- Depot(s): Fuhaocun
- Rolling stock: 3 car Type A, reservations for 3+3 car Type A in the future

History
- Planned opening: 2027; 1 year's time (planned)

Technical
- Line length: 18.1 km (11.2 mi)
- Character: Underground
- Operating speed: 100 km/h (62 mph)

Line M101 of the Beijing Subway (Chinese: 北京地铁M101线; pinyin: Běijīng Dìtiě M101 Xiàn) is a rapid transit line under construction in Tongzhou District, Beijing, China. It will run from Shangwuyuan to Zhangjiawandong. It is fully underground. It is scheduled to open in 2027. The line will be 18.1 kilometres (11.2 mi) in length with 14 stations.

== Stations ==
| Station name | | Connections |
| English | Chinese | Connections |
|---|---|---|
| Shangwuyuan | 商务园 | |
| Tongzhou West Railway Station | 通州西站 | M102 (under planning) |
| Tongshun Lu | 通顺路 | |
| Tongzhou Huiyi Zhongxin | 通州会议中心 | |
| Longwangzhuang | 龙旺庄 | |
| Tonghu Dajie | 通胡大街 | M103 (under planning) |
| Yudaihe Dajie | 玉带河大街 | |
| Beijing Tongzhou Railway Station | 北京通州站 | Pinggu (U/C); 6 (via Beiyunhedong) |
| Xingzheng Bangong Xiqu | 行政办公西区 | |
| Beijing Dajuyuan | 北京大剧院 | M104 (under planning) |
| Tiyu Zhongxin | 体育中心 | |
| Zhangjiawanxi | 张家湾西 | |
| Zhangjiawan | 张家湾 | M102 (under planning) M104 (under planning) |
| Zhangjiawandong | 张家湾东 | |
