= Tongyun Subdistrict =

Tongyun Subdistrict 通运街道
- Subdistrict
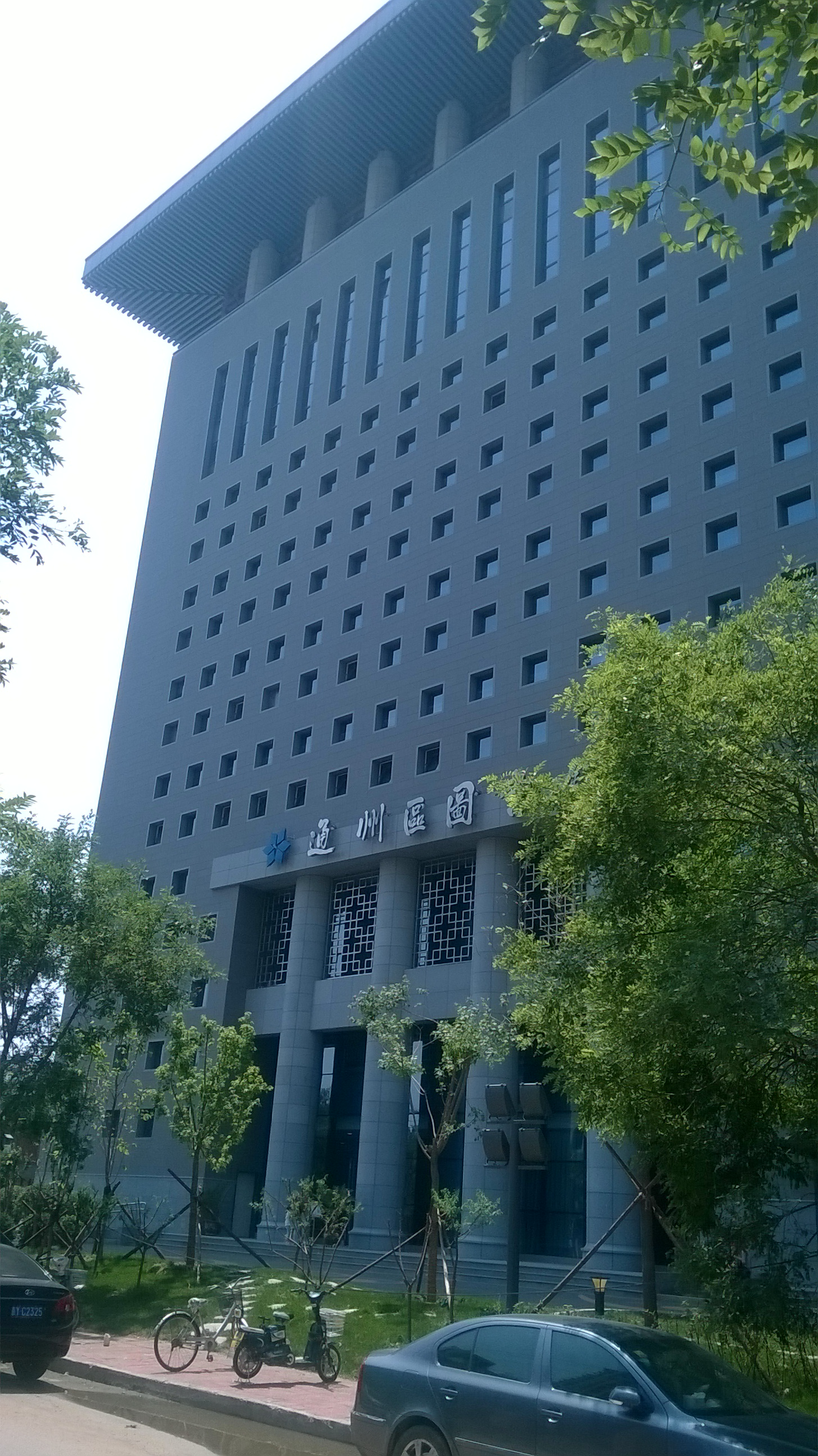
- Beijing Tongzhou District Library, 2014

- Location within Beijing Location within China
- Coordinates: 39°54′43″N 116°41′29″E
- Country: China
- Municipality: Beijing
- District: Tongzhou
- Village-level Divisions: 10 communities

Area
  - Total: 5.48 km^{2} (2.12 sq mi)

Population (2020)
  - Total: 49,613
  - Density: 9,050/km^{2} (23,400/sq mi)
- Time zone: UTC+8 (China Standard)
- Postal code: 101100
- Area code: 010

Tongyun Subdistrict (Chinese: 通运街道; pinyin: Tōngyùn Jiēdào) is a subdistrict in Tongzhou District, Beijing. It borders Yongshun and Lucheng Towns in the north, Luyuan Subdistrict in the east, Yuqiao and Zhongcang Subdistrict in the south, and Xinhua Subdistrict in the west. In 2020, the population for this subdistrict was 49,613.

The subdistrict was created in 2018. Its name Tongyun (Chinese: 通运) was from Tongyunmen, the east city gate of the old Tongzhou city.

== Administrative divisions ==
In the year 2021, Tongyun Subdistrict had 10 communities under its administration:

Administrative division code	Subdivision names	Name transliteration
110112008001	星河	Xinghe
110112008002	运河园	Yunheyuan
110112008003	运河湾	Yunhewan
110112008004	京贸家园	Jingmao Jiayuan
110112008005	紫荆雅园	Zijing Yayuan
110112008006	水仙园	Shuixianyuan
110112008007	荔景园	Lijingyuan
110112008008	芙蓉	Furong
110112008009	牡丹园	Mudanyuan
110112008010	融御	Rongyu

== Gallery ==
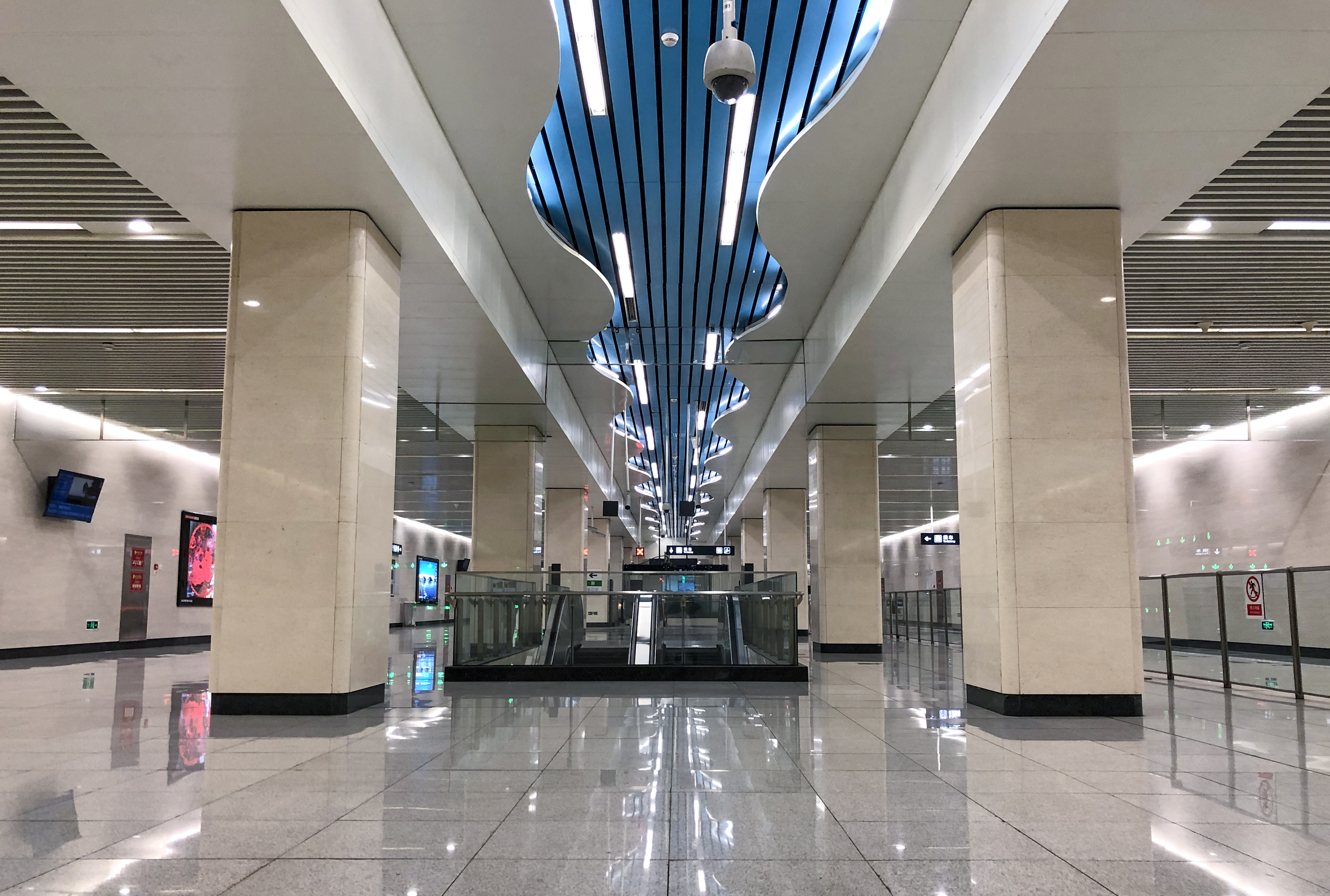
Interior of Beiyunhe East Station of Beijing Subway, on the south of the subdistrict, 2019

== See also ==
- List of township-level divisions of Beijing
