= Tangshan South railway station =

Railway station in Tangshan, Hebei

Tangshan South 唐山南
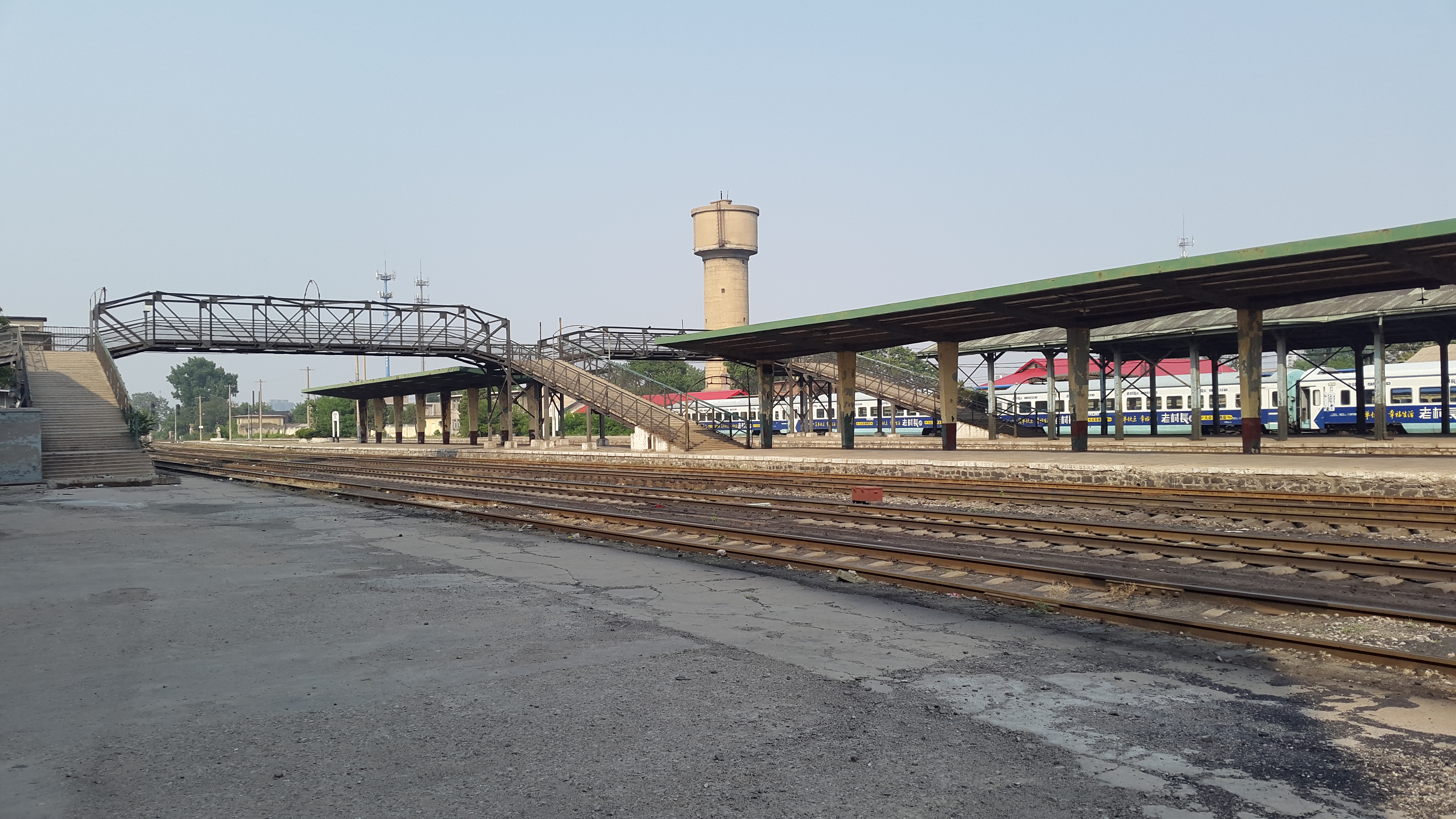

General information
- Location: Lunan District, Tangshan, Hebei; China
- Coordinates: 39°36′44″N 118°11′46″E
- Line: Qidaoqiao–Luanxian railway

History
- Opened: 1882
Location

Tangshan South railway station (Chinese: 唐山南站) is a railway station in Lunan District, Tangshan, Hebei, China. It is an intermediate stop on the Qidaoqiao–Luanxian railway.

== History ==
The station opened in 1882 as Tangshan railway station. In 1907 the station was relocated approximately 1 kilometre (0.62 miles) to its current site. In the 1990s it was renamed Tangshan South following the opening of the new Tangshan railway station to passenger services in 1994. On 26 June 1996 the station closed to passenger services.

On 18 January 2018, a passenger service was reinstated at the station.

== See also ==
- Tangshan railway station
- Tangshan West railway station
