= Beiyunhexi station =

Beijing Subway station

Beiyunhexi 北运河西
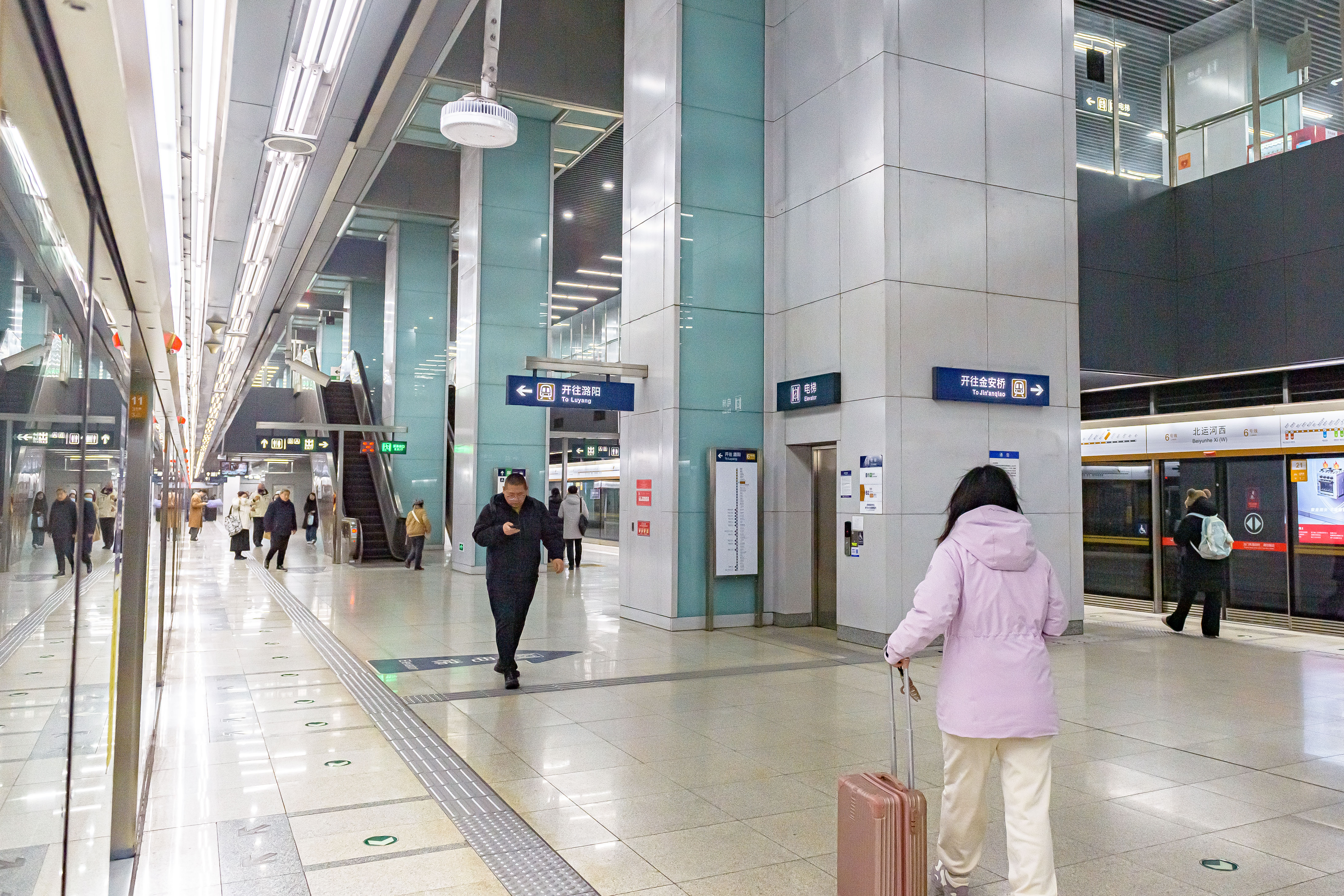
- Platform

General information
- Location: Zhongcang Subdistrict, Tongzhou District, Beijing; China
- Coordinates: 39.9028°N 116.6899°E
- Operator: Beijing Mass Transit Railway Operation Corporation Limited
- Line: Line 6
- Platforms: 2 (1 island platform)
- Tracks: 2

Construction
- Structure type: Underground
- Accessible: Yes

History
- Opened: December 28, 2014; 11 years ago

Services
Preceding station	Beijing Subway	Following station
Tongyun Men towards Jin'anqiao	Line 6	Beiyunhedong towards Luyang
Location
- Location within Beijing

Beiyunhexi (simplified Chinese: 北运河西站; traditional Chinese: 北運河西站; pinyin: Běiyùnhé Xī Zhàn) is a station on Line 6 of the Beijing Subway. The construction of this station began on September 20, 2012, and was completed in 2014. This station is located in Tongzhou District, Beijing on the western shore of the Grand Canal.

== Station layout ==
The station has an underground island platform.

== Exits ==
There are 2 exits, lettered A and B. Exit A is accessible.
