= Beijing–Binhai intercity railway =

Railway line in China

Beijing–Binhai intercity railway 京滨城际铁路

Overview
- Status: Operational
- Locale: Beijing, Hebei, and Tianjin
- Termini: Beijing; Binhai West

Service
- Type: High-speed rail
- Services: 1
- Operator(s): China Railway Beijing Group

Technical
- Line length: 171.7 km (107 mi)
- Track gauge: 1,435 mm (4 ft 8 1/2 in)

Beijing–Binhai intercity railway
- Simplified Chinese: 京滨城际铁路
- Traditional Chinese: 京濱城際鐵路
Transcriptions
Standard Mandarin
- Hanyu Pinyin: Jīng-Bīn chéngjì tiělù

Second Beijing–Tianjin intercity railway
- Simplified Chinese: 京津第二城际铁路
- Traditional Chinese: 京津第二城際鐵路
Transcriptions
Standard Mandarin
- Hanyu Pinyin: Jīng-Jīn dì'èr chéngjì tiělù

Beijing–Binhai intercity railway (abbreviated as Jingbin intercity railway), formerly known as the Second Beijing–Tianjin intercity railway, is a high-speed railway connecting the municipalities of Beijing and Tianjin. The western section of the railway is built as part of the Beijing–Tangshan intercity railway. From Baodi railway station onwards, the railway will branch south along new trackage to Binhai West railway station in Binhai New Area of Tianjin.

Together with the Beijing–Tangshan intercity railway, this railway forms part of a proposed regional 4 North-South lines, 4 East-West lines that together form a network for fast commuter services across the densely populated Beijing, Tianjin and Hebei area.

== History ==
=== Baodi to Beichen section ===
Advanced engineering commenced onsite at 29 December 2015. The section opened on 30 December 2022.

=== Beichen to Binhai West section ===
The remaining section from Beichen to Binhai West began construction on 6 November 2022.

== Route ==
It starts at Beijing railway station, which is located in Dongcheng District. And then it goes into Xianghe County, Hebei, and Baodi District, Tianjin. This project then deviates from the Beijing-Tangshan ICR alignment to travel south through eastern Wuqing District, Ninghe District, Beichen District, Dongli District serving a station at Tianjin Binhai International Airport then terminating in Tianjin's Binhai New Area.

== Stations ==
The section from Baodi to Beichen opened on 30 December 2022. The remaining section is also under construction.

Station Name	Chinese	Metro transfers/connections
Through service via Beijing–Tangshan intercity railway to Beijing
Baodi	宝坻	
Baodi South	宝坻南	
Beichen	北辰	
Binhai Airport East	滨海国际机场东	
Binhai West	滨海西	
