= Tangshan–Caofeidian railway =

Railway line in Hebei, China

Overview
- Status: Operational

Service
- Type: Heavy rail

History
- Opened: 30 June 2018

Technical
- Track gauge: 1,435 mm (4 ft 8 1/2 in) standard gauge
- Electrification: 50 Hz 25,000 V
- Operating speed: 160 km/h (99 mph)

The Tangshan–Caofeidian railway is a railway line in China. The railway connects Tangshan to the ports at Caofeidian.

== History ==
Construction of the railway began in 2015. It opened on 30 June 2018.

A passenger service between Tangshan and Caofeidian East was introduced on 28 December 2018.
