= Xinhua Subdistrict, Beijing =

Xinhua Subdistrict 新华街道
- Subdistrict
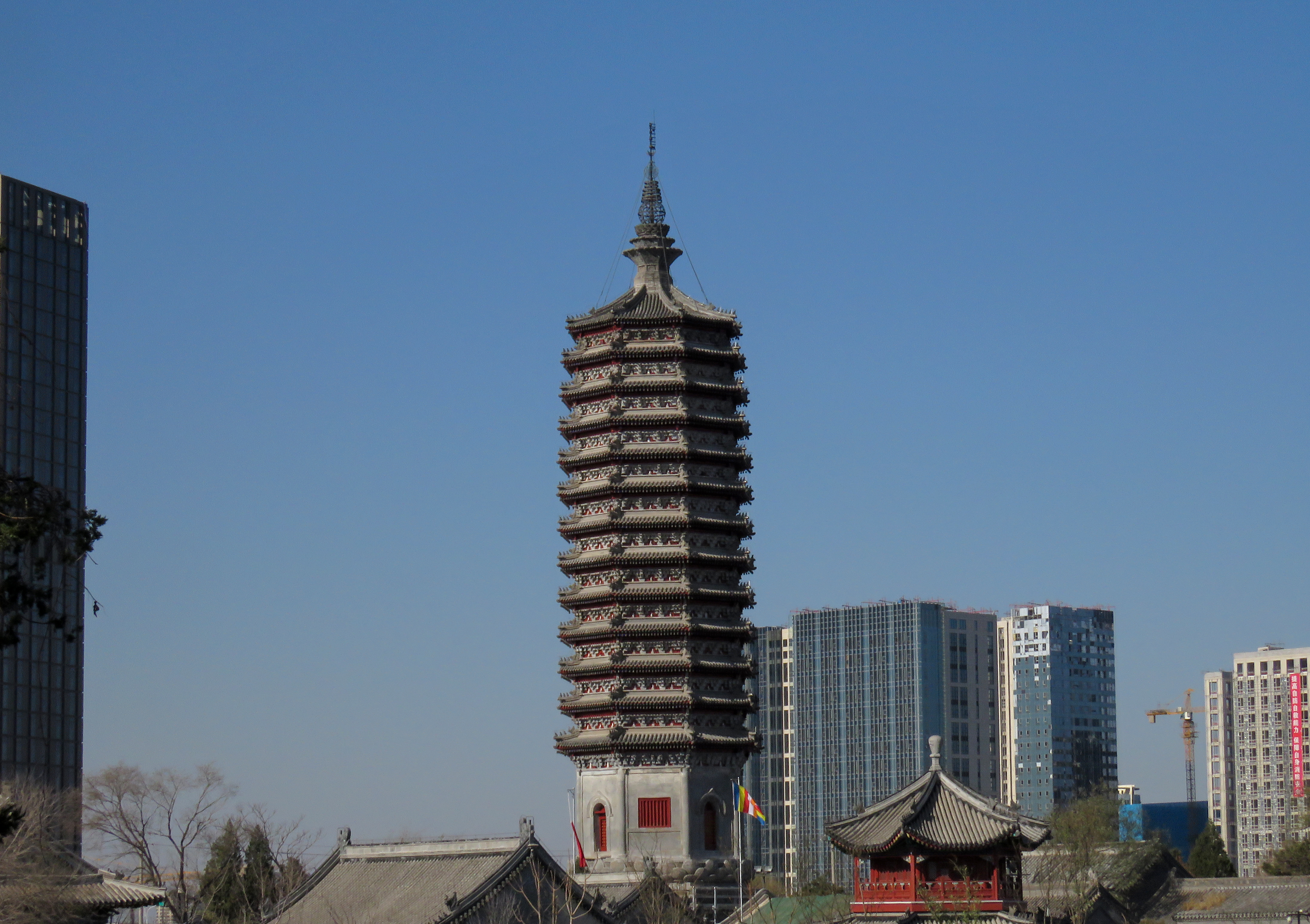
- Tonngzhou Randeng Pagoda within the subdsitrict, 2017

- Location within Beijing Location within China
- Coordinates: 39°54′33″N 116°39′33″E
- Country: China
- Municipality: Beijing
- District: Tongzhou
- Village-level Divisions: 9 communities

Area
  - Total: 4.45 km^{2} (1.72 sq mi)

Population (2020)
  - Total: 37,286
  - Density: 8,380/km^{2} (21,700/sq mi)
- Time zone: UTC+8 (China Standard)
- Postal code: 101199
- Area code: 010

Xinhua Subdistrict (Chinese: 新华街道; pinyin: Xīnhuá Jiēdào) is a subdistrict in Tongzhou District, Beijing. It borders Yongshun Town in the north and west, Tongyun Subdistrict in the east, Zhongcang Subdistrict in the south, and Beiyuan Subdistrict in the southwest. The area of jurisdiction is 4.45 square kilometers, with 37,286 residents as of 2020.

The name Xinhua (Chinese: 新华; lit. 'New China') corresponds to Xinhua Avenue that runs through the subdistrict.

== History ==
In 1948, four townships of former Tongxian were merged to create Tongzhou City. The city was changed to a town in 1950. In 1997, Tongzhou Town was disbanded, with Beicheng and Xinjian Subdistricts merged to form Xinhua Subdistrict.

== Administrative division ==
Xinhua Subdistrict has jurisdiction over the following areas:

Administrative division code	Subdivision names	Name transliteration
110112002001	天桥湾	Tianqiaowan
110112002009	如意	Ruyi
110112002018	盛业家园	Shengye Jiayuan
110112002019	京贸国际城	Jingmao Guojicheng
110112002020	京贸北区	Jingmao Beiqu
110112002021	河畔雅园	Hepan Yayuan
110112002406	保利绿地商务公寓工作站	Baoli Lüdi Shangwu Gongyu Gongzuozhan
110112002407	新光大中心商务公寓工作站	Xinguangda Zhongxin Shangwu Gongyu Gongzuozhan
110112002408	侨商总部基地商务公寓工作站	Qiaoshang Zongbu Jidi Shangwu Gongyu Gongzuozhan

== Gallery ==
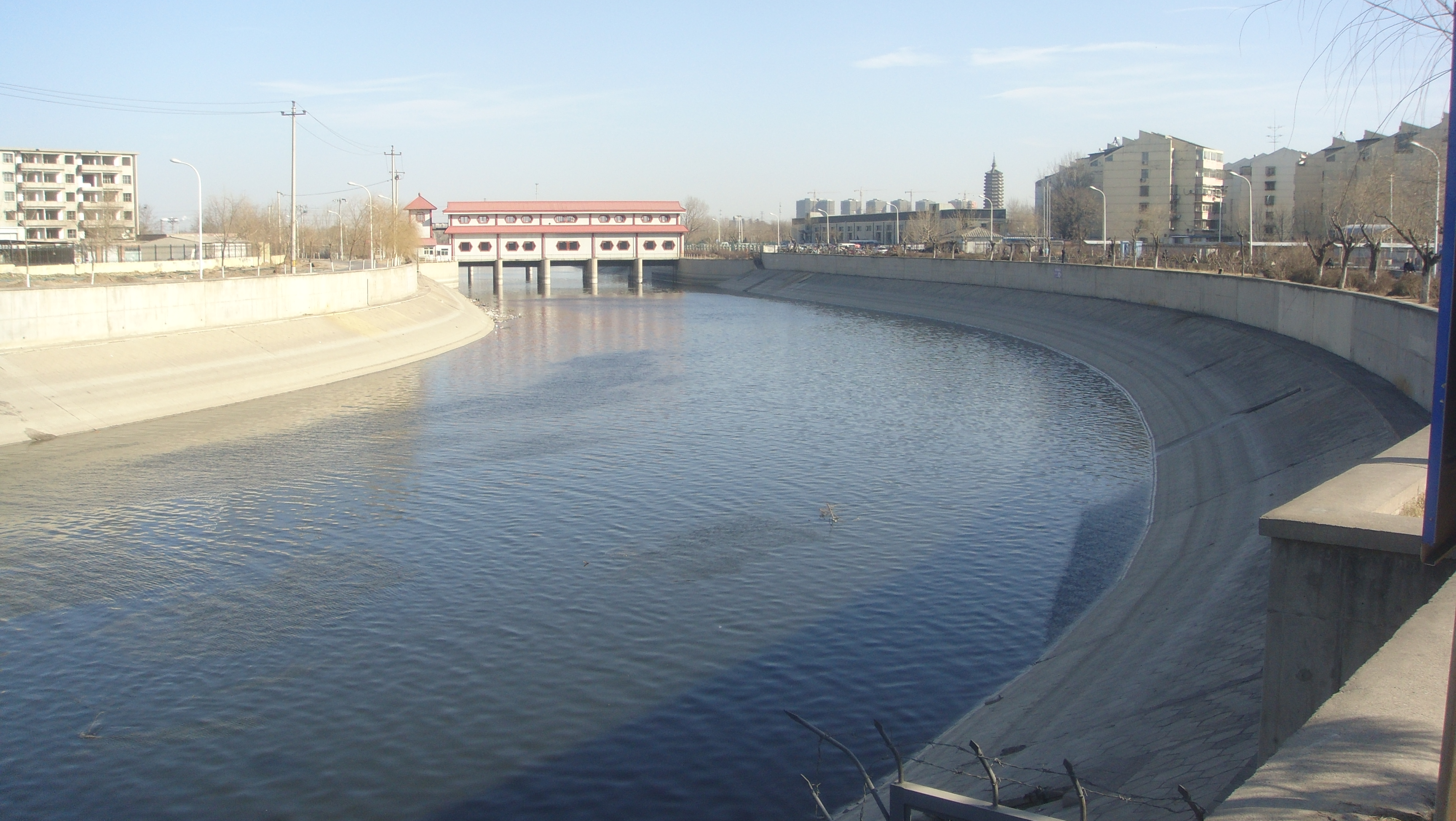
Tonghui River that passes through the subdistrict, 2011

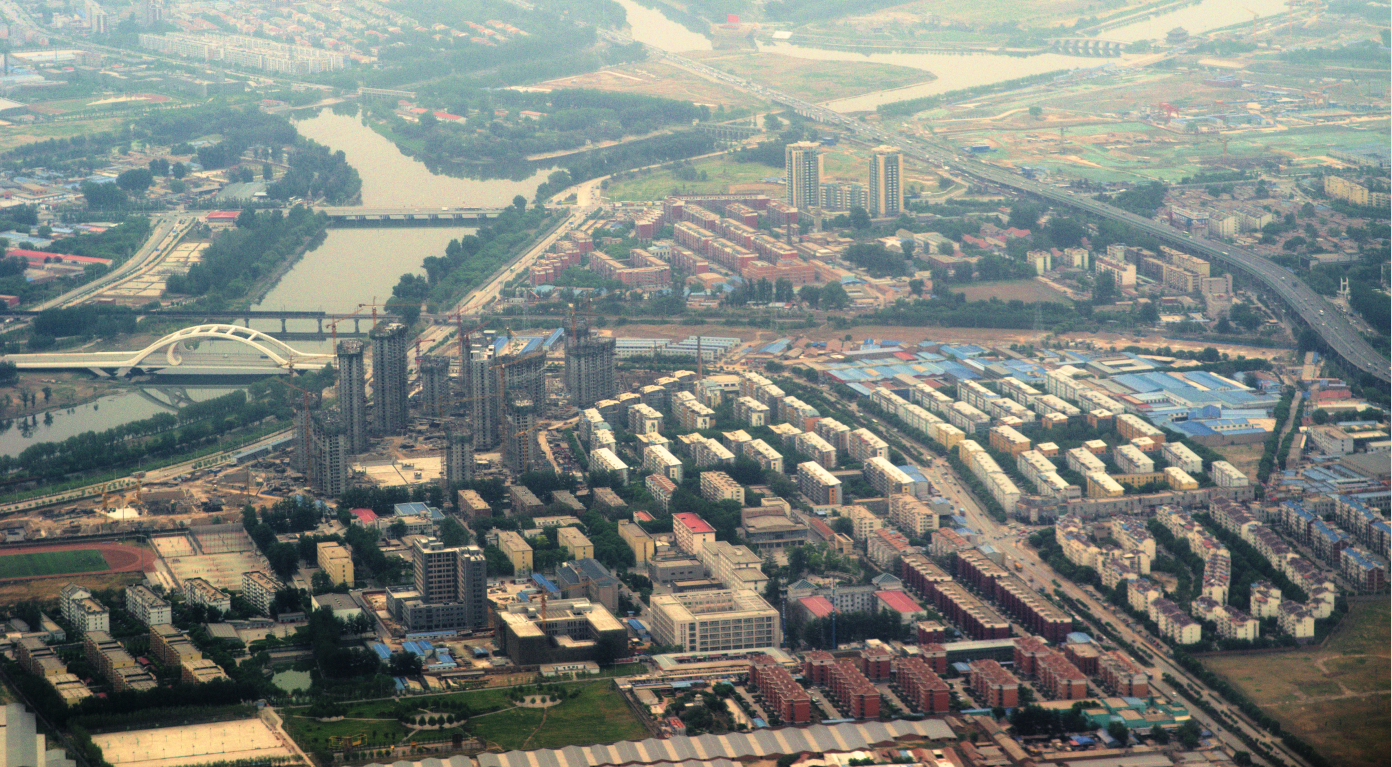
Aerial view of the subdistrict, 2013

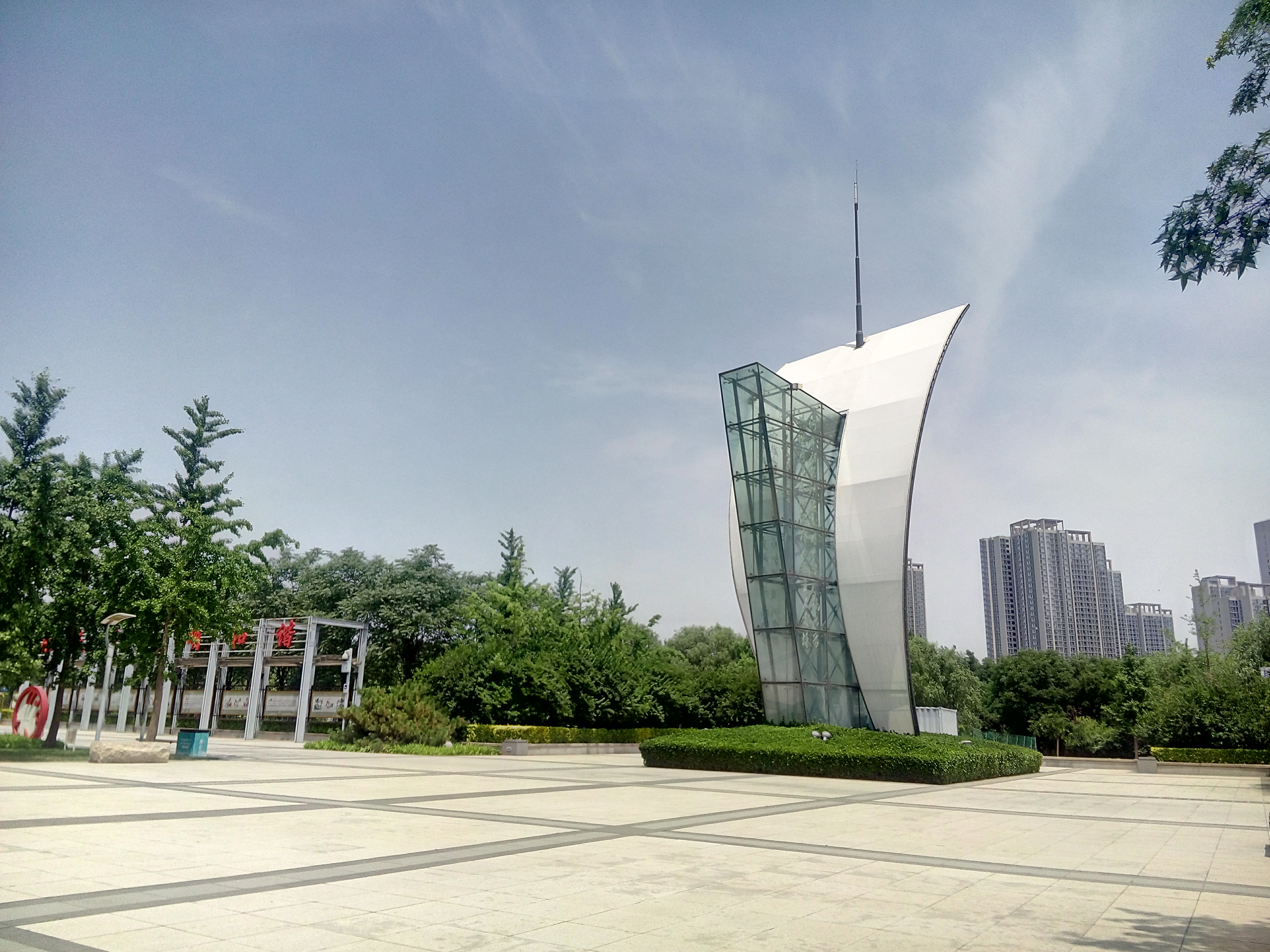
Canal Park at the east bank of Jinghang Grand Canal, 2015

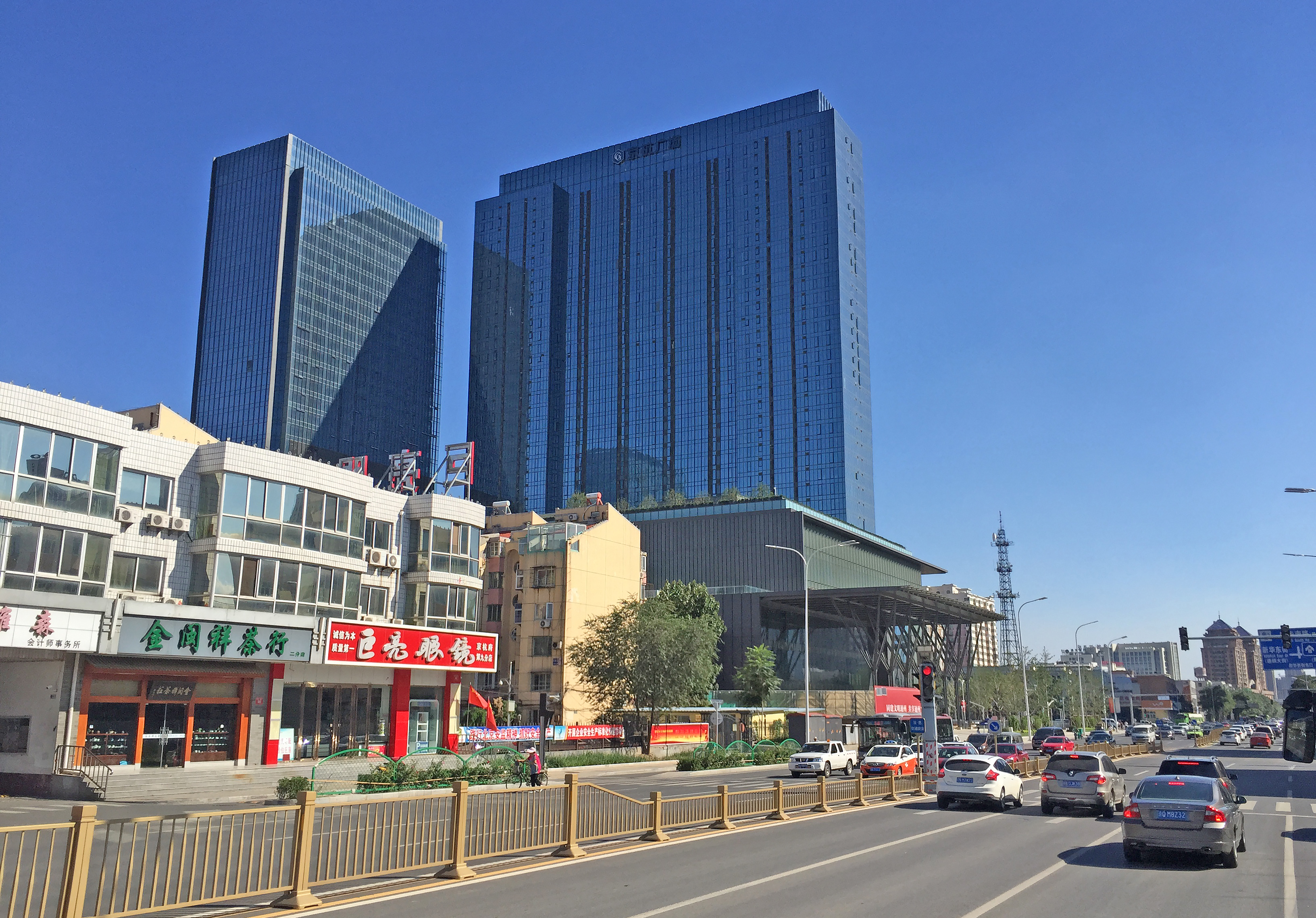
Grand Canal Center south of the Tonghui River, 2016
