= Binhai West railway station =

Railway station in Binhai, Tianjin, China

Binhai West 滨海西
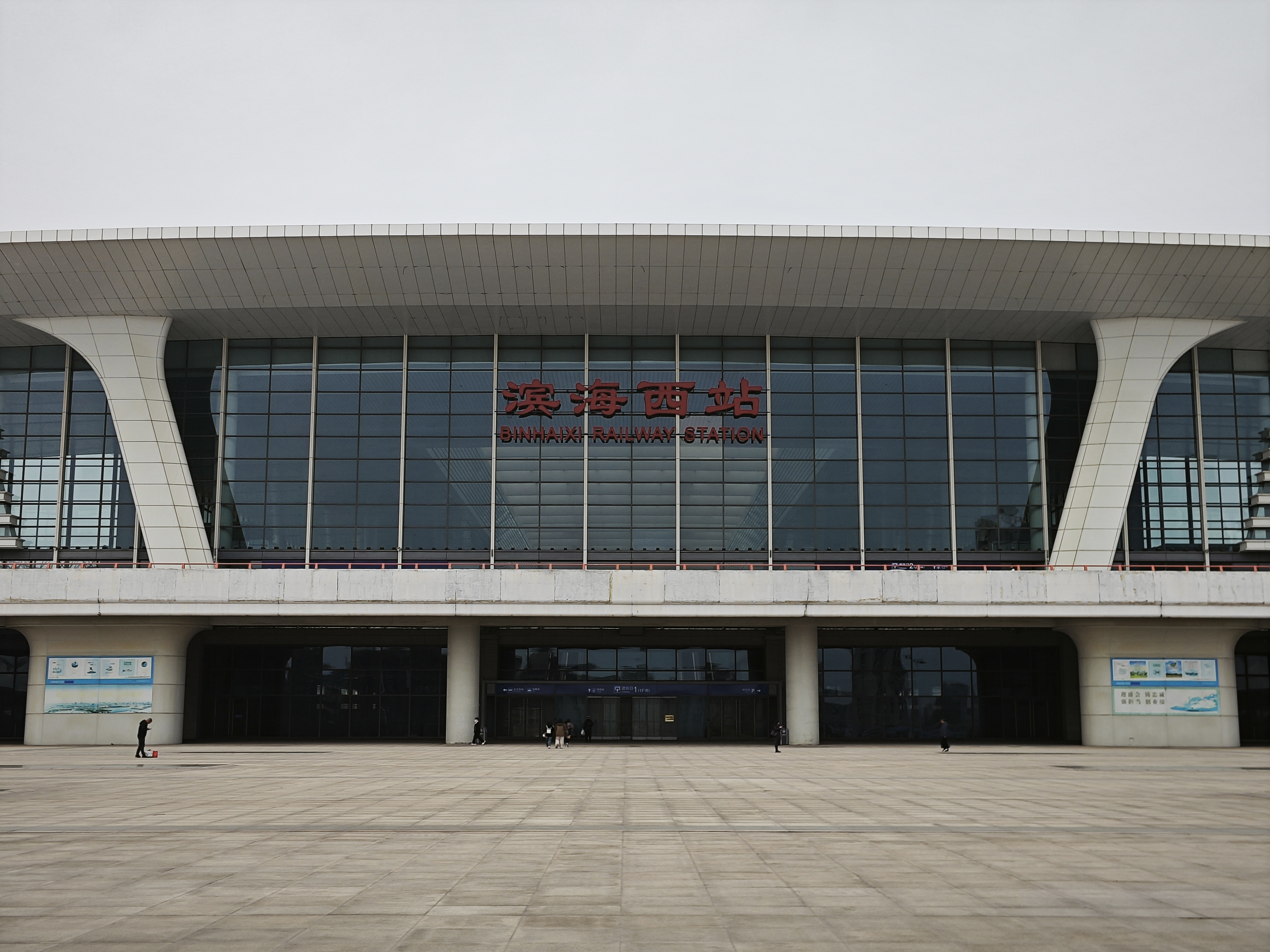

General information
- Location: Binhai New Area, Tianjin; China
- Coordinates: 39°04′50″N 117°36′42″E
- Operated by: China Railway Beijing Group; China Railway Corporation
- Line(s): Tianjin–Qinhuangdao high-speed railway Beijing–Binhai intercity railway (U/C)
- Platforms: 8

Other information
- Station code: TMIS code: 10354; Telegraph code: FHP; Pinyin code: BHX

History
- Opened: 1 December 2013
Location

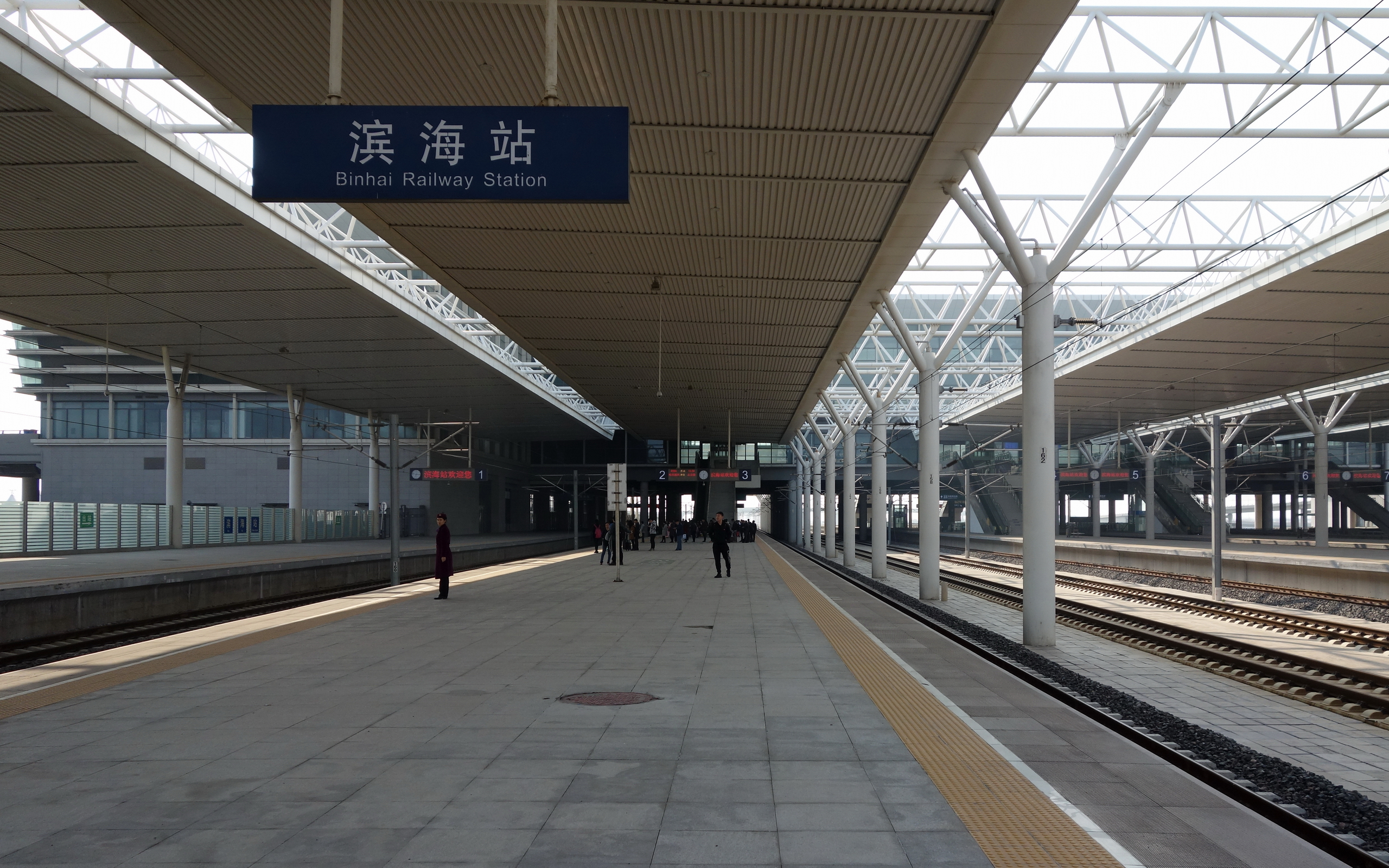
Platform (before rename to Binhai West)

Binhaixi (Binhai West) railway station (Chinese: 滨海西站; pinyin: Bīnhǎixī Zhàn), formerly known as Binhai railway station, is a railway station on the Tianjin–Qinhuangdao high-speed railway and is the largest located within the Binhai New Area, Tianjin, China. It is one of four major rail hubs in Tianjin, with Tianjin, Tianjin West and Binhai railway stations. The name of the station was changed from Binhai to Binhai West on 5 January 2019.

The station was opened on 1 December 2013 along with the Tianjin–Qinhuangdao high-speed railway. It will be served by Line B1 and Line Z2 of Tianjin Metro in the future.

== Location ==
This station is located on Haichuan Lu (Road), Binhai, Tianjin. It serves as the major long-distance high-speed railway station for the Binhai New Area. It is located 12 km from the central business district of Binhai, adjacent to the south of the Tianjin Economic and Technology Development Area (TEDA).

== Station Structure ==
The station has two island and two side platforms, serving eight high-speed rail tracks. Future expansion has been allowed for with extra space for new platforms and tracks north of the existing lines. The building covers an area of 80,000 square metres (860,000 sq ft). The Waiting Hall is situated above the tracks has a designed peak capacity of 2,500 people. Platforms and the station entrances are at ground level. Basement levels contain the Arrivals Hall and parking for 990 private cars. A long distance bus station with an area of 20,000 square metres is attached to the station complex.

| Preceding station | China Railway High-speed | Following station |
|---|---|---|
| Junliangcheng North towards Tianjin West | Tianjin–Qinhuangdao high-speed railway | Binhai North towards Qinhuangdao |
