= Beiyunhedong station =

Beijing Subway station

Beiyunhedong 北运河东
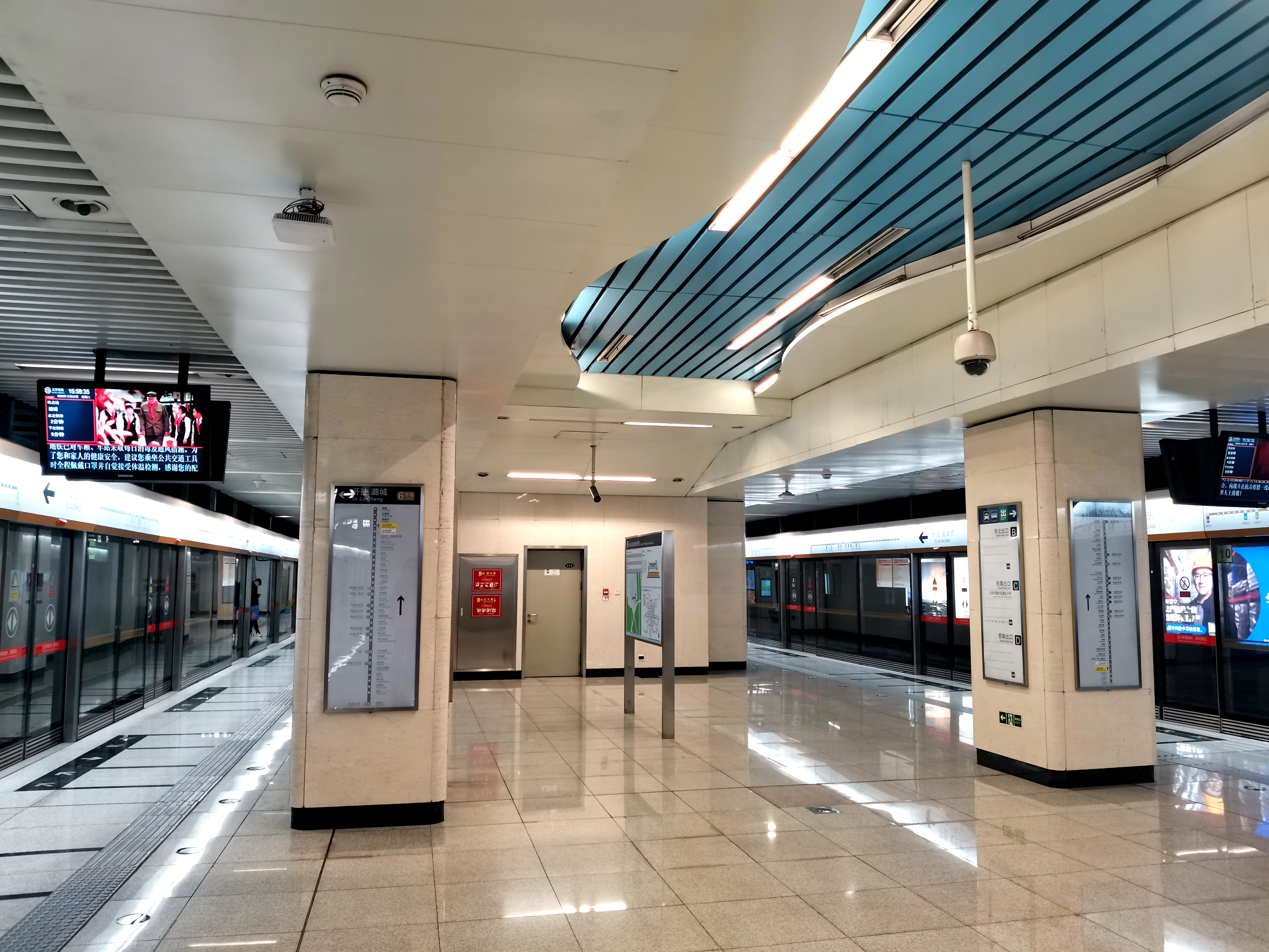
- Platform

General information
- Other names: Huizhanzhongxin (会展中心)
- Location: Yangtuo East Street and Yangtuo Middle Road, Tongyun Subdistrict, Tongzhou District, Beijing; China
- Coordinates: 39.902006°N 116.701131°E
- Operator: Beijing Mass Transit Railway Operation Corporation Limited
- Lines: Line 6; Line 22 (via Beijing Tongzhou railway station; opening 2026)
- Platforms: 2 (1 island platform)
- Tracks: 2

Construction
- Structure type: Underground
- Accessible: Yes

History
- Opened: December 30, 2018; 7 years ago

Services
Preceding station	Beijing Subway	Following station
Beiyunhexi towards Jin'anqiao	Line 6	Haojia Fu towards Luyang
Transfer at Beijing Tongzhou railway station (future)
Yunhe Shangwuqu towards Dongdaqiao	Line 22 Opening 2026 transfer at Beijing Tongzhou railway	Zhengwuzhongxin towards Pinggu
Location
- Location within Beijing

Beiyunhedong station (Chinese: 北运河东站; pinyin: Běiyùnhé Dōng zhàn) is a station on Line 6 of the Beijing Subway. It was opened on December 30, 2018.

== Station layout ==
The station has an underground island platform.

== Exits ==
There are 3 exits, lettered B, C, and D. Exit B is accessible.

== Connection ==
There is a 600-meter connection underground passageway to Beijing Tongzhou railway station in the north of the station.
