= Tianjin–Qinhuangdao high-speed railway =

Railway line in China

Tianjin–Qinhuangdao passenger railway
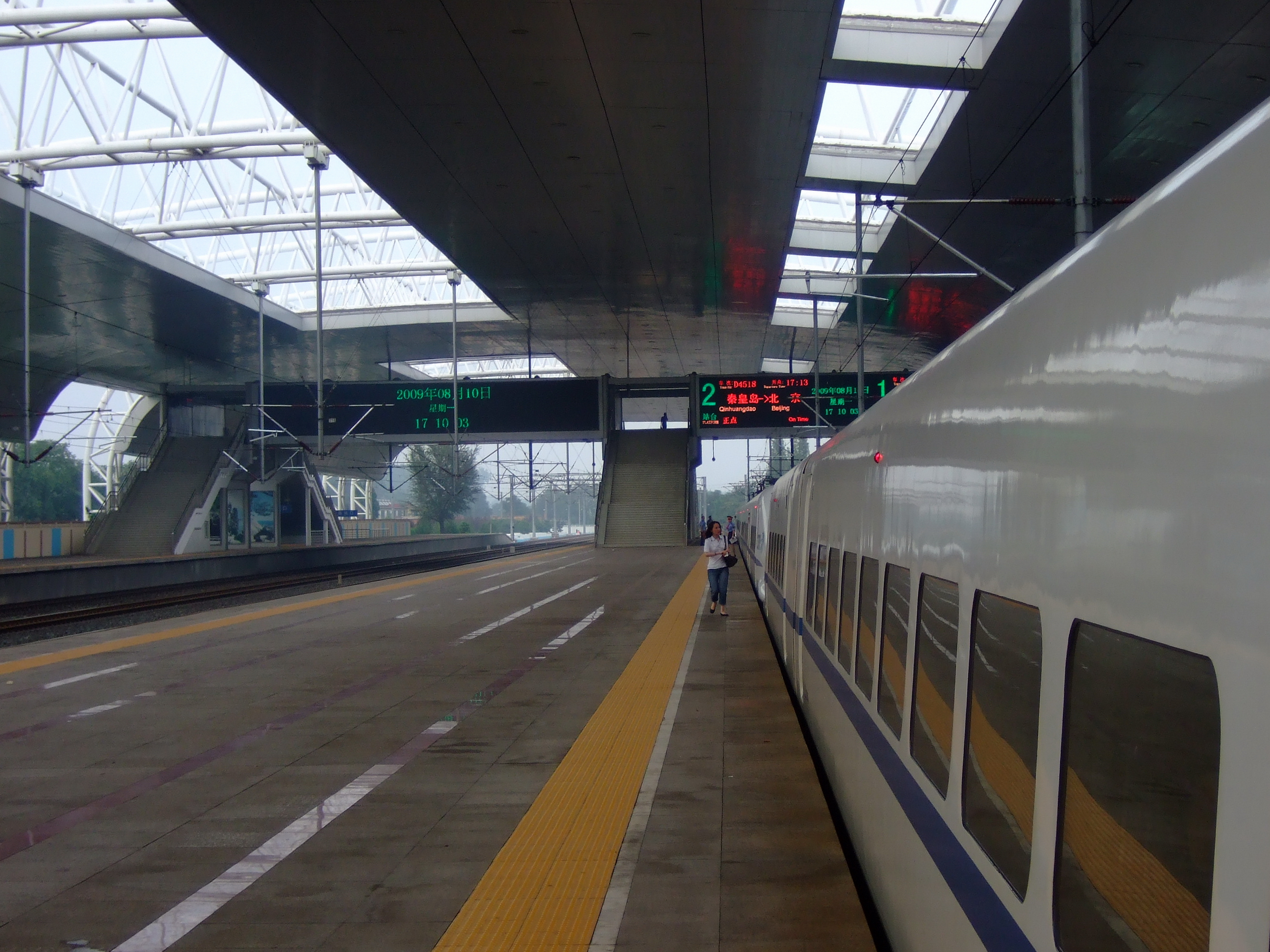
- Beidaihe Railway Station

Overview
- Native name: 津秦客运专线 津秦高速铁路
- Status: Operational
- Owner: CR Beijing
- Locale: Tianjin; Hebei province
- Termini: Tianjin West; Qinhuangdao
- Stations: 9

Service
- Type: High-speed rail
- System: China Railway High-speed
- Operator: CR Beijing

History
- Opened: December 1, 2013; 12 years ago

Technical
- Line length: 261 km (162 mi) (main line)
- Num of tracks: 2 (Double-track)
- Track gauge: 1,435 mm (4 ft 8 1/2 in) standard gauge
- Electrification: 25 kV 50 Hz AC (Overhead line)
- Operating speed: 350 km/h (217 mph)

Tianjin–Qinhuangdao high-speed railway (Chinese: 津秦客运专线 or 津秦高铁) is a high-speed railway linking Tianjin and Qinhuangdao, Hebei. This railway is part of the Coastal corridor line of the National high-speed rail grid. It links up Beijing–Shanghai high-speed railway and Harbin–Dalian high-speed railway. The line opened on December 1, 2013.
