= Tangshan railway station =

Railway station in Lubei District, People's Republic of China

Coordinates: 39°37′27″N 118°6′46″E

Tangshan 唐山
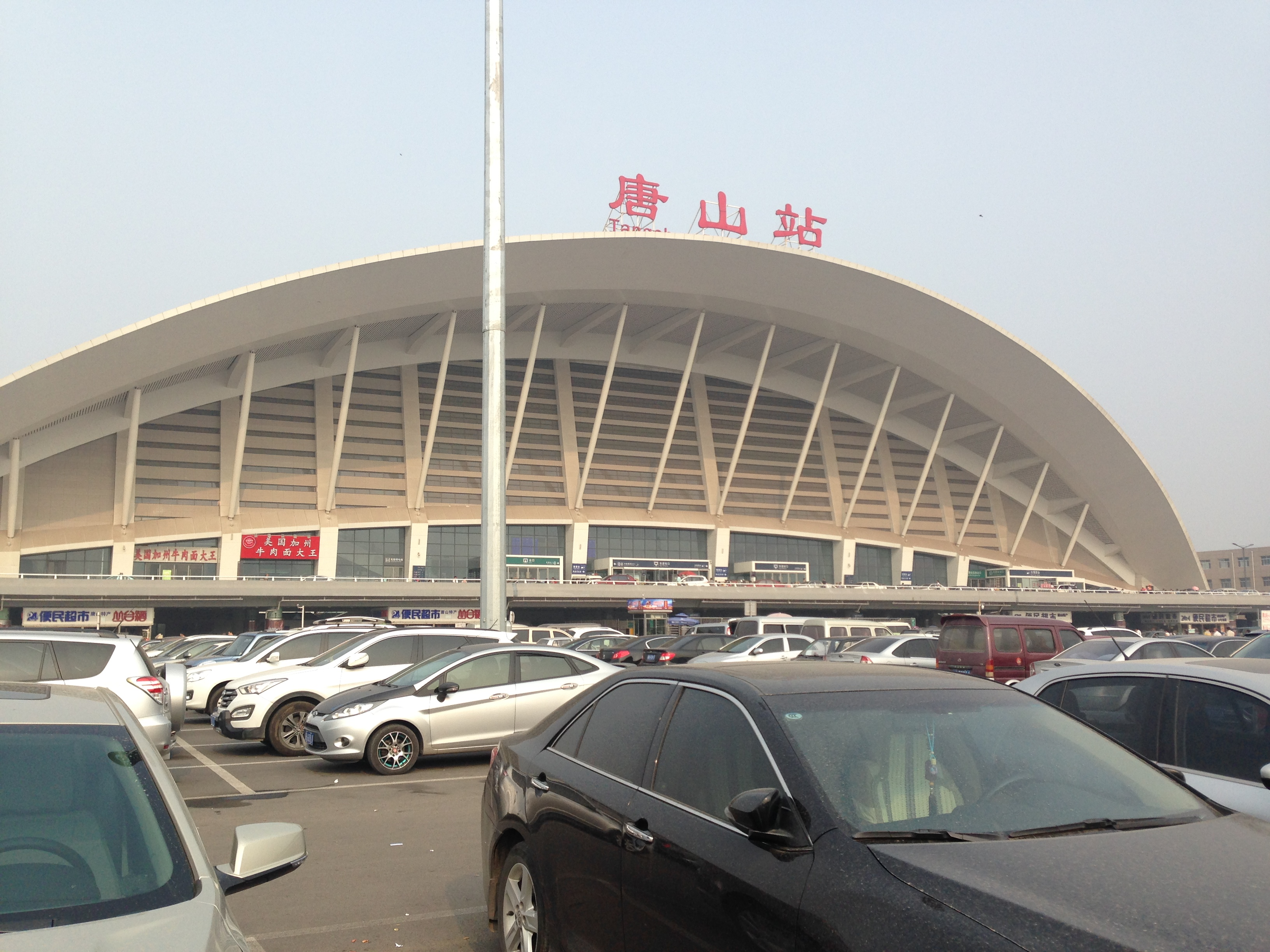

General information
- Location: Lubei District, Tangshan, Hebei; China
- Operated by: China Railway Corporation
- Line(s): Tianjin–Shanhaiguan railway; Tianjin–Qinhuangdao high-speed railway; Beijing–Tangshan intercity railway
- Platforms: 7

History
- Opened: 11 November 1994

Tangshan railway station (Chinese: 唐山站) is a station in Lubei District, Tangshan, Hebei, China. It is located on the Tianjin–Shanhaiguan railway, Tianjin–Qinhuangdao high-speed railway and the Beijing–Tangshan intercity railway.

== History ==
Construction of Tangshan railway station started on 17 March 1993, and opened to passenger services on 11 November 1994. The original Tangshan railway station was renamed Tangshan South.

On 26 November 2013, a new station building was put into use.

== See also ==
- Tangshan South railway station
- Tangshan West railway station (station on Beijing-Tangshan intercity railway, U/C)

Preceding station	China Railway	Following station
Lutai towards Tianjin	Tianjin–Shanhaiguan railway	Qian'an towards Shanhaiguan
Preceding station	China Railway High-speed	Following station
Binhai North towards Tianjin West	Tianjin–Qinhuangdao high-speed railway	Luanhe towards Qinhuangdao
