= Lucheng =

Lucheng may refer to the following locations in China:

Districts

- Lucheng District, Changzhi (潞城区), Shanxi
- Lucheng District, Wenzhou (鹿城区), Zhejiang

Subdistricts

- Lucheng, Kangding (炉城街道), seat of Kangding County, Sichuan
- Lucheng Subdistrict, Yidu (陆城街道), in Yidu, Yichang, Hubei
- Lucheng, Yueyang (陆城街道), in Yunxi District, Yueyang, Hunan
- Lucheng Subdistrict, Qufu (鲁城街道), Shandong

Towns

- Lucheng (鹿城镇), the county seat of Funan County, Anhui
- Lucheng (庐城镇), the county seat of Lujiang County, Anhui
- Lucheng, Beijing (潞城镇), in Tongzhou District, Beijing
- Lucheng, Jincheng (潞城镇), in Lingchuan County, Shanxi
- Lucheng, Yunnan (鹿城镇), the seat of Chuxiong City, Yunnan

Station

- Lucheng railway station, in Lucheng District, Changzhi, Shanxi, a station on Handan–Changzhi railway
- Lucheng station (Beijing Subway) (潞城站) on Beijing Subway Line 6
- Lucheng station (Changzhou Metro) (潞城站) on Changzhou Metro Line 2
