= Haojia Fu station =

Beijing Subway station

Haojia Fu 郝家府
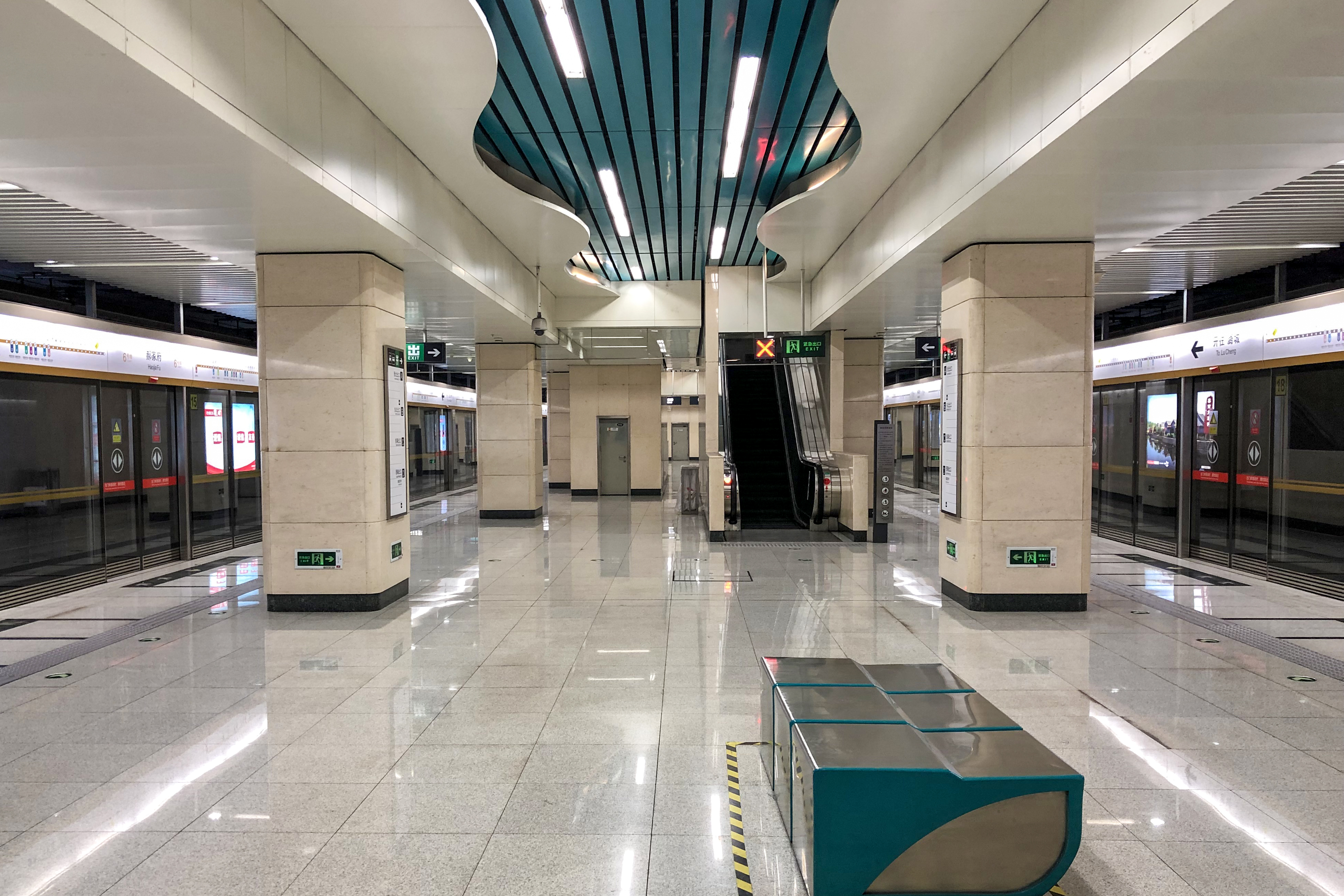
- Platform after re-opening

General information
- Location: Lucheng, Tongzhou District, Beijing; China
- Coordinates: 39.9024°N 116.7204°E
- Operator: Beijing Mass Transit Railway Operation Corporation Limited
- Line: Line 6
- Platforms: 2 (1 island platform)
- Tracks: 2

Construction
- Structure type: Underground
- Accessible: Yes

History
- Opened: December 28, 2014; 11 years ago November 9, 2018; 7 years ago (reopened)
- Closed: October 11, 2017; 8 years ago (road construction)

Services
Preceding station	Beijing Subway	Following station
Beiyunhedong towards Jin'anqiao	Line 6	Dongxia Yuan towards Luyang
Qingnian Lu towards Jin'anqiao	Line 6 Express	Dongxia Yuan towards Luyang
Location
- Location within Beijing

Haojia Fu station (Chinese: 郝家府站; pinyin: Hǎojiā Fǔ Zhàn) is a station on Line 6 of the Beijing Subway. It is located in Lucheng, Tongzhou District. Construction began on September 20, 2012.

The station was opened on December 28, 2014. The station was temporary closed on October 11, 2017, due to road construction. It was reopened on November 9, 2018.

== Station layout ==
The station has an underground island platform.

== Exits ==
There are 4 exits, lettered A, B, C, and D. Exits A and C are accessible.

== Gallery ==
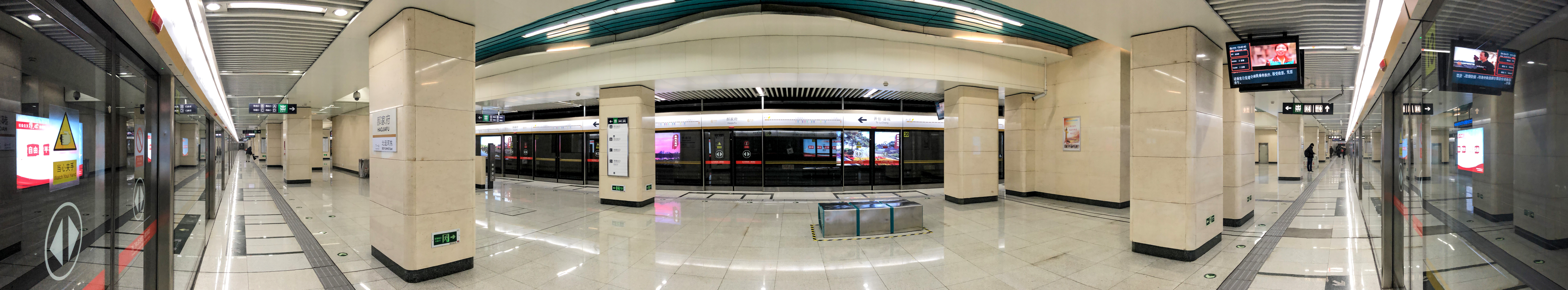
panorama of Haojia Fu Station platform
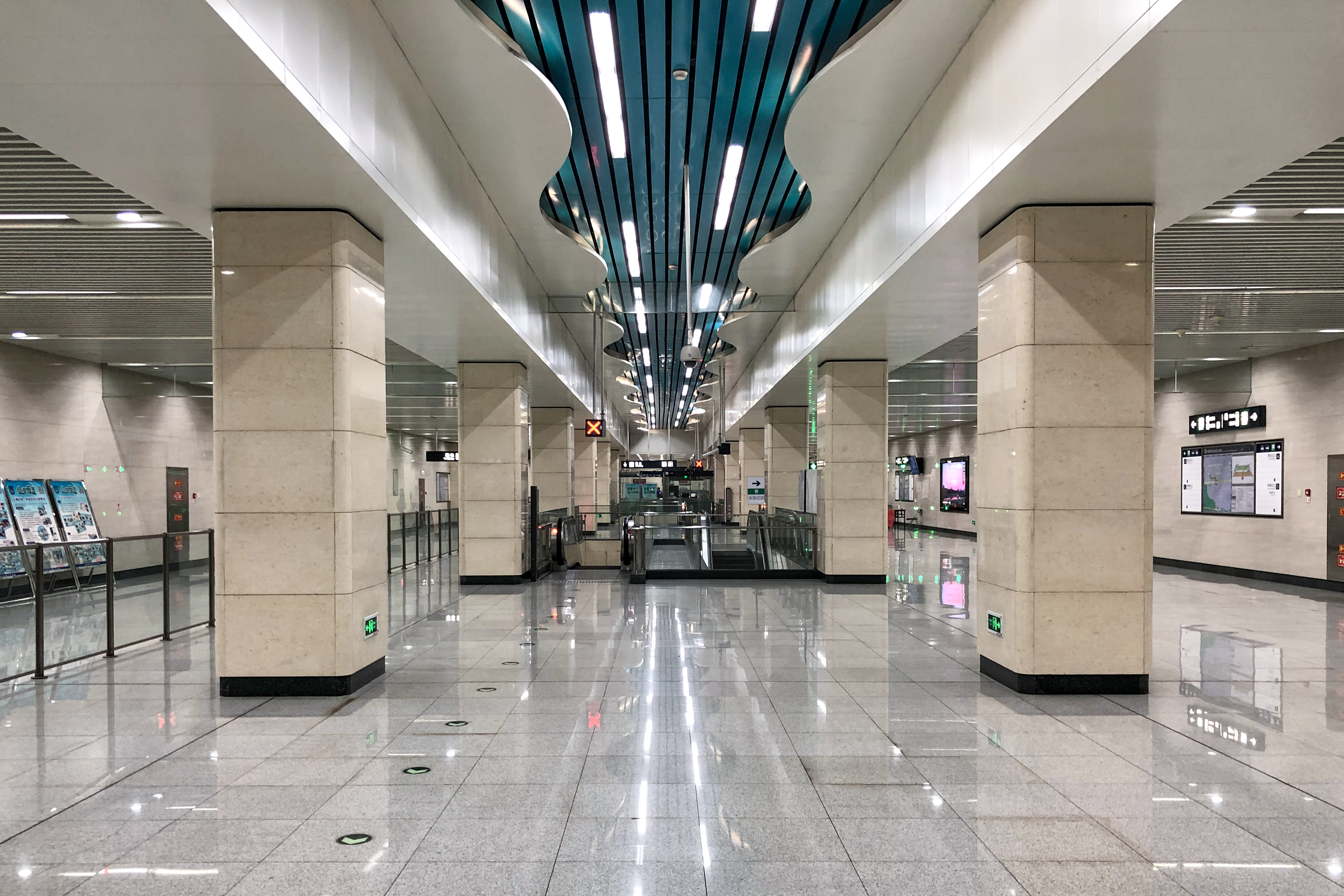
station hall

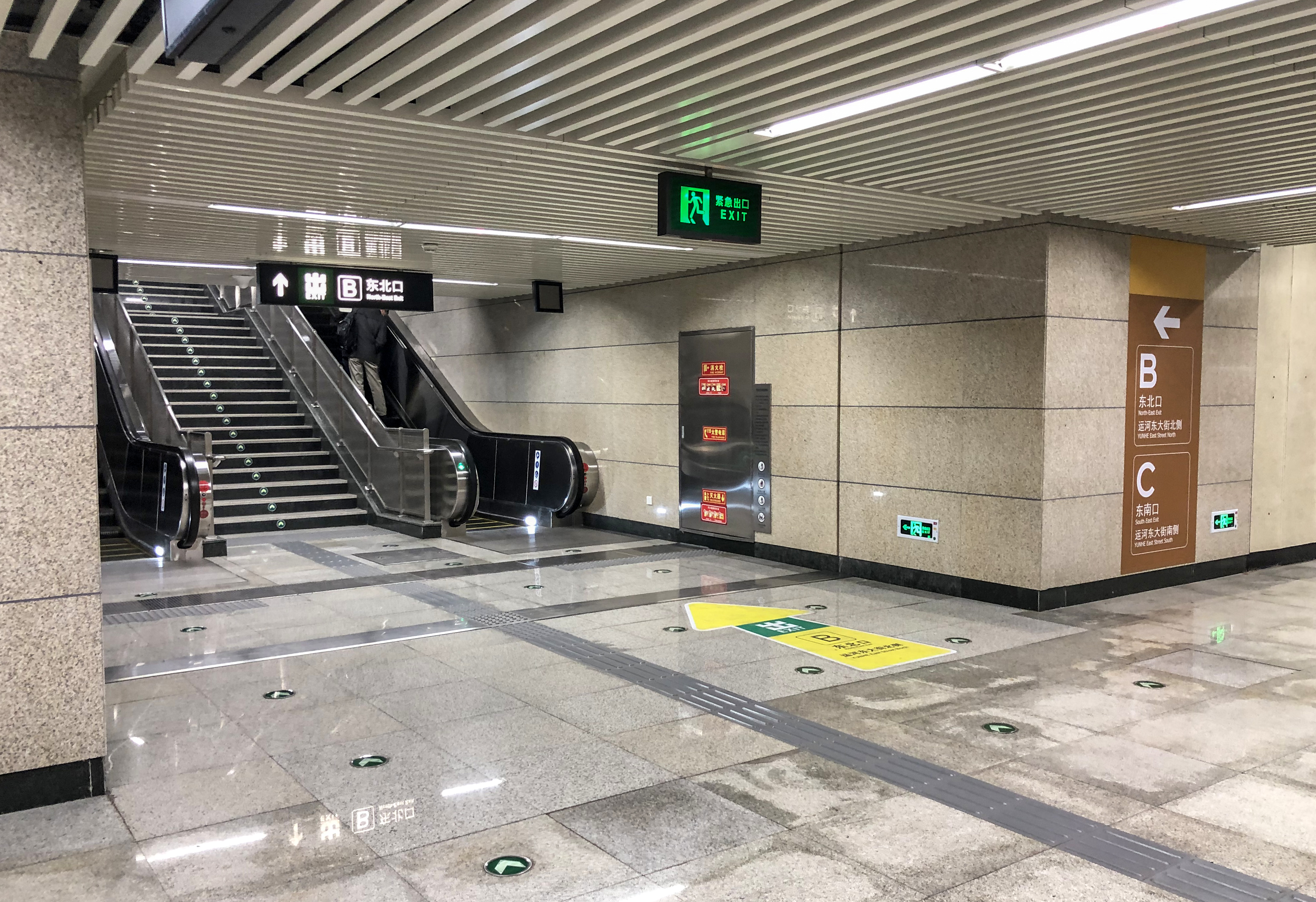
exit B corridor

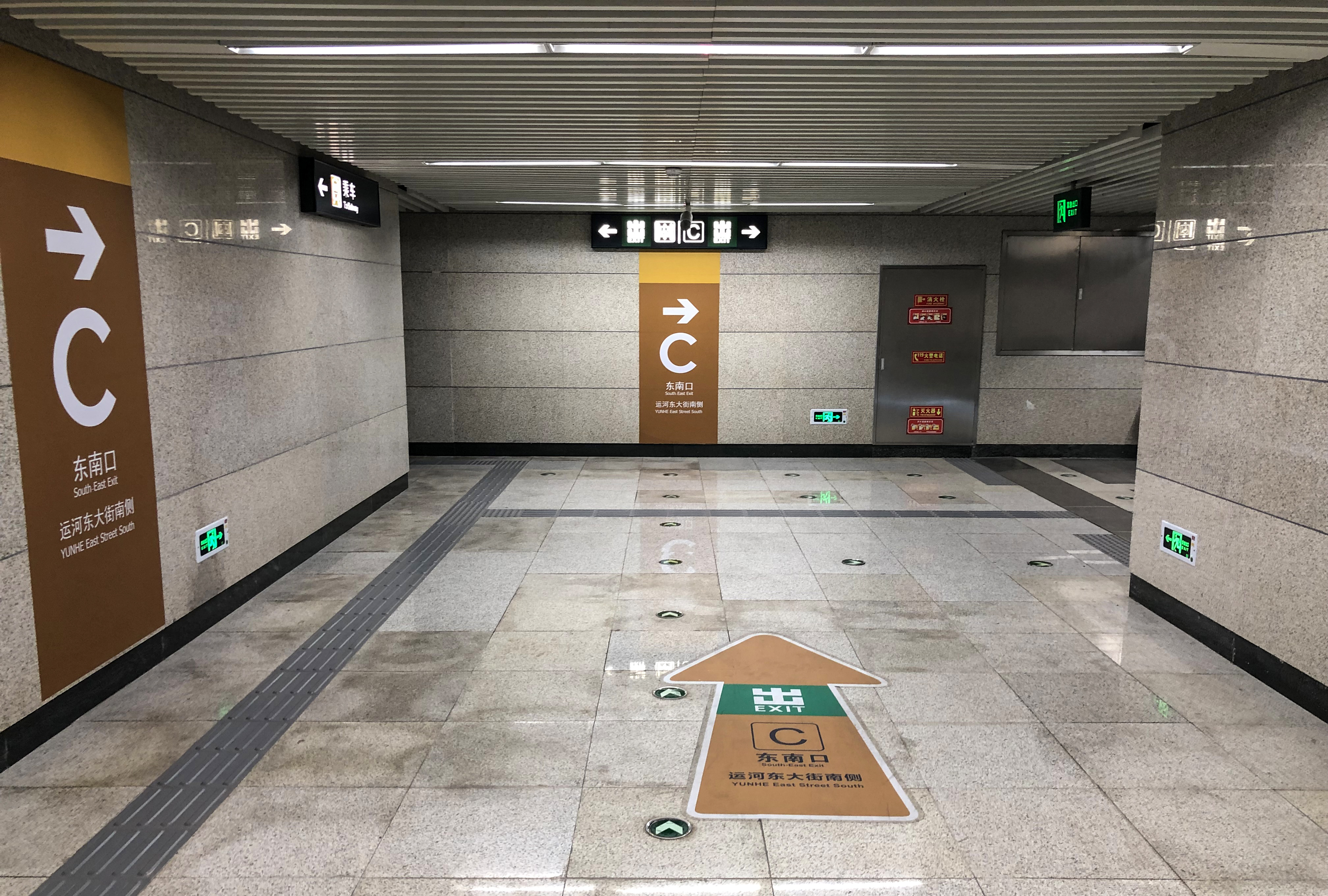
exit C corridor

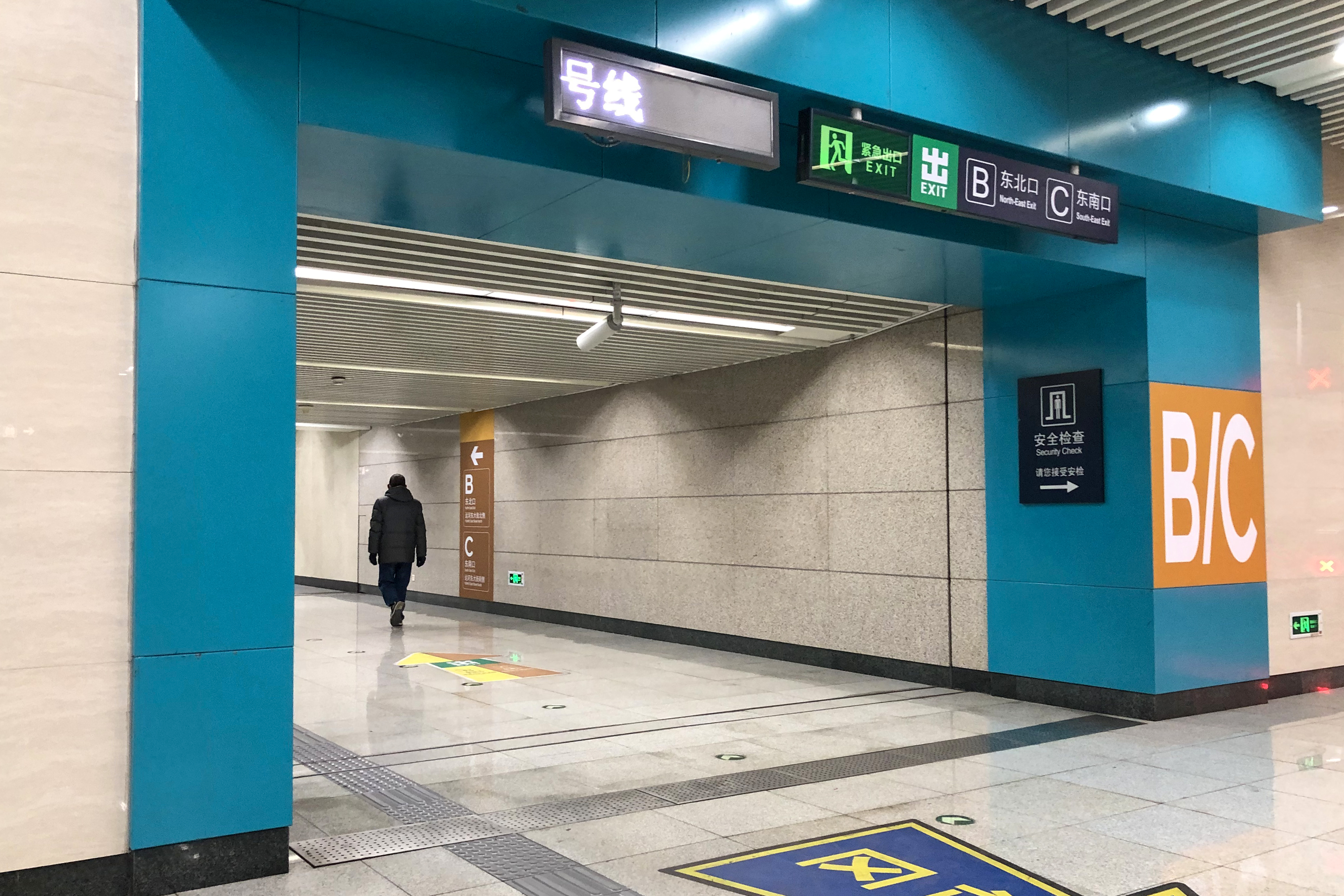
exits B-C corridor

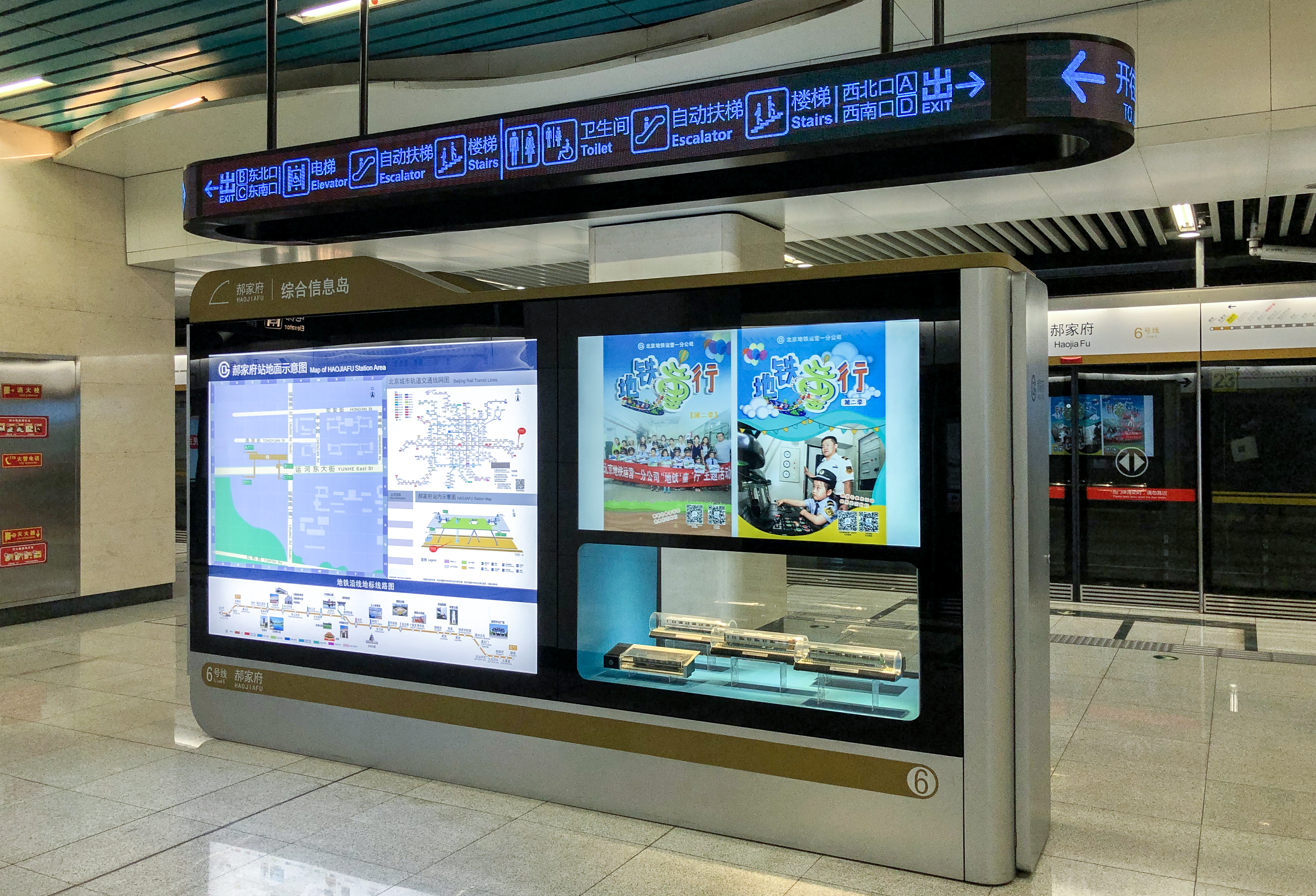
directory

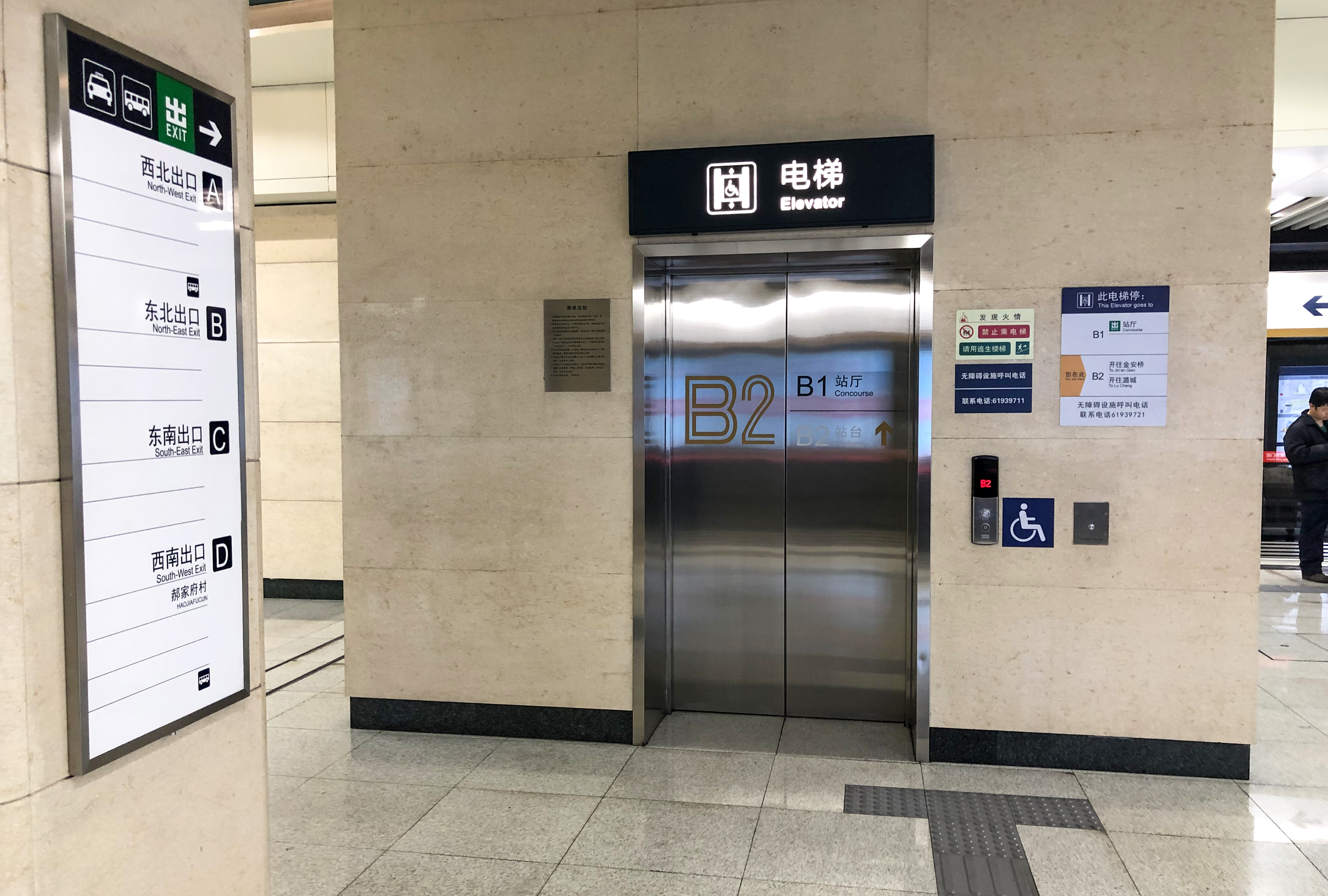
platform kone elevator

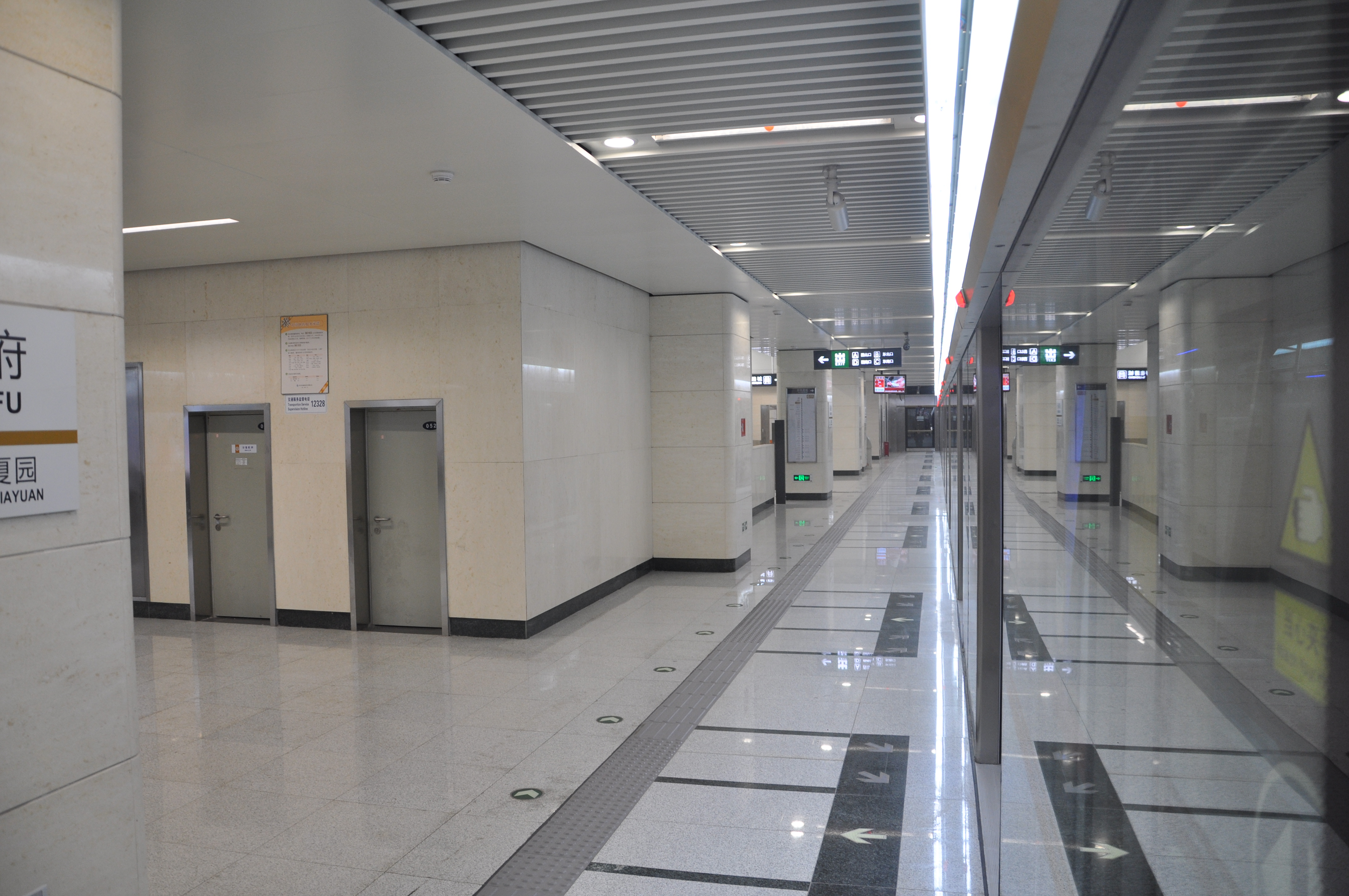
platform
