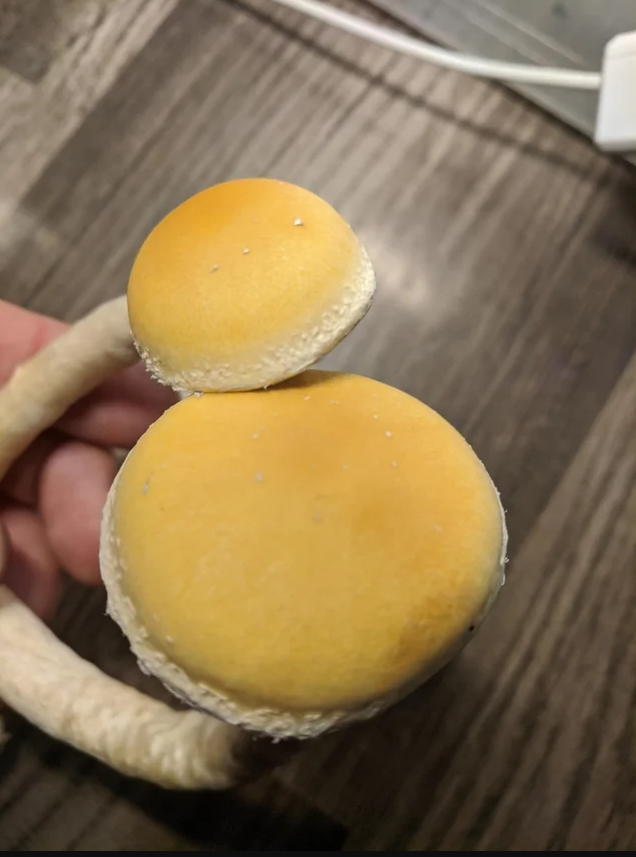

Scientific classification
- Kingdom: Fungi
- Division: Basidiomycota
- Class: Agaricomycetes
- Order: Agaricales
- Family: Hymenogastraceae
- Genus: Psilocybe
- Species: P. chuxiongensis

Binomial name
- Psilocybe chuxiongensis T.Ma & K.D.Hyde (2014)

= Psilocybe chuxiongensis =

Species of fungus

Psilocybe chuxiongensis is a species of psilocybin mushroom in the family Hymenogastraceae. Described as new to science in 2014, it is found in subtropical China. The type specimens, collected in August 2009, were found growing singly to scattered on cow dung. It is generally found in grasslands where cattle have grazed. The type locality was on Zixi Mountain (in the southwest of Chuxiong City) at an elevation of 2,237 metres (7,339 ft). The fruit bodies resemble Psilocybe cubensis, but can be distinguished from that species by its buff-yellow to yellowish-brown cap that lacks an umbo, and the lack of a ring on the stipe. It is classified in section Caerulescentes of the genus Psilocybe. P. chuxiongensis is one of 14 Psilocybe species found in China. In a molecular phylogenetic analysis of DNA sequences, P. chuxiongensis was most closely related to P. cubensis, grouping in a clade sister to P. allenii and P. cyanescens.

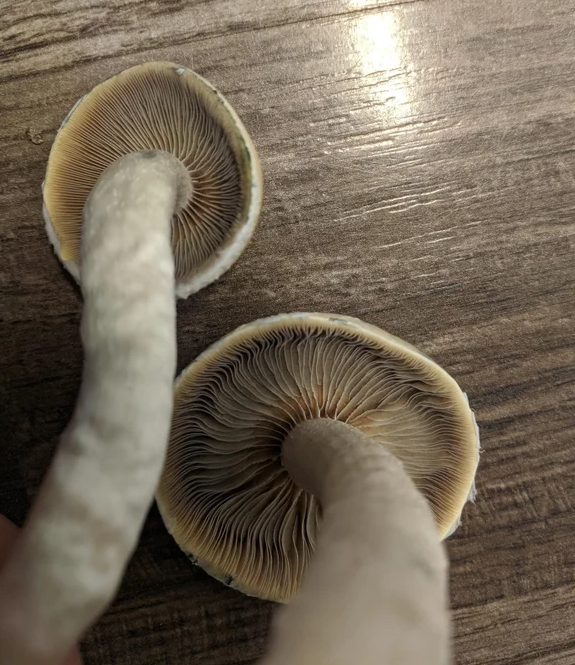
Gills

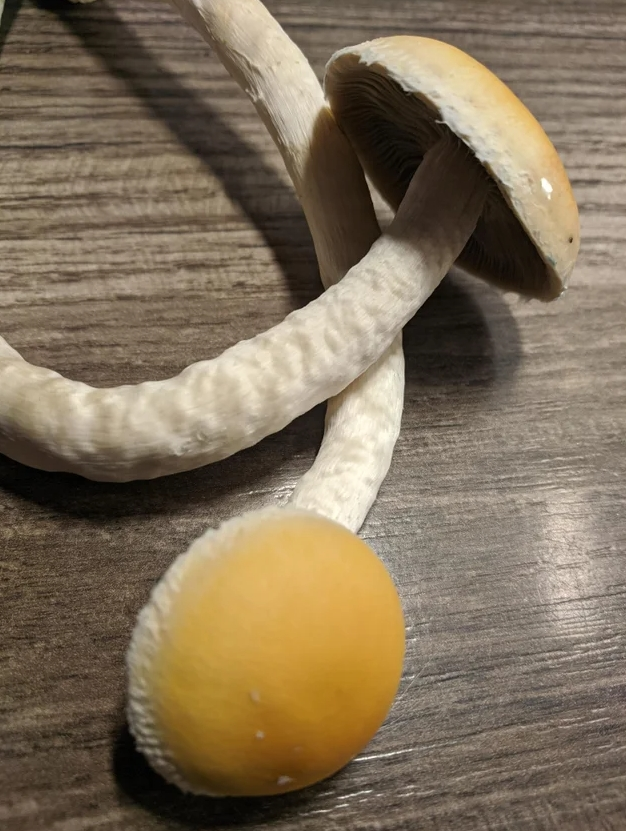
Side

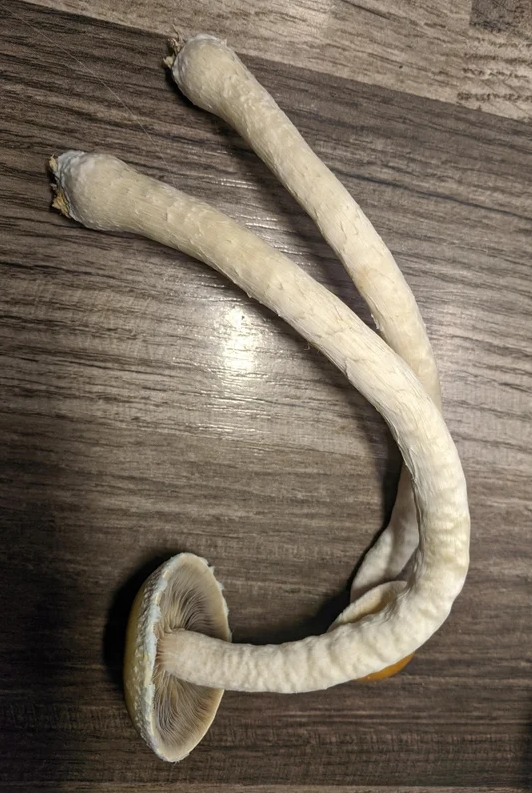
Entire

== See also ==
- List of psilocybin mushrooms
- List of Psilocybe species
