= Dongxia Yuan station =

Beijing Subway station

Dongxia Yuan 东夏园
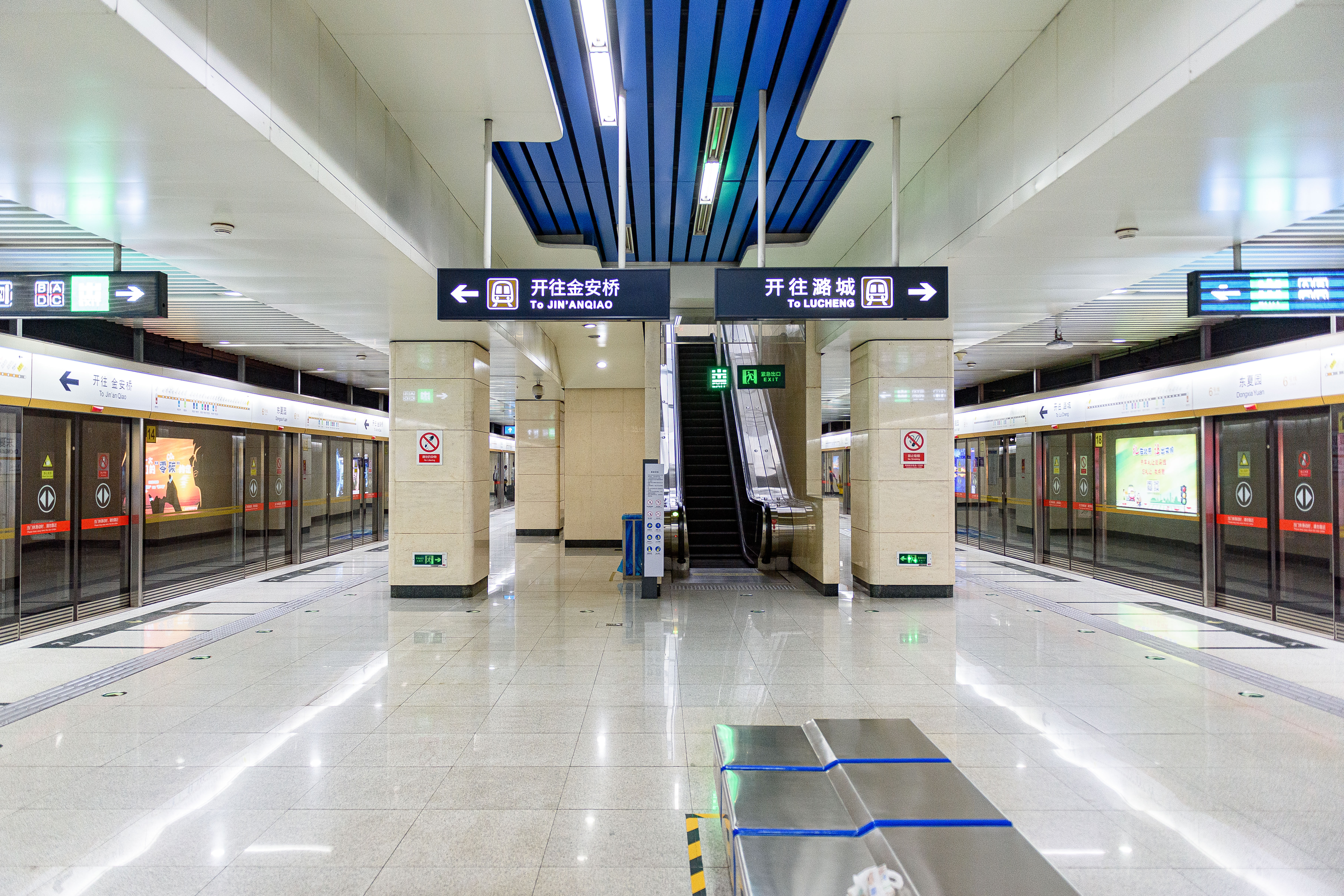
- Platform

General information
- Location: East Yunhe Street (运河东大街); Tongzhou District, Beijing; China
- Coordinates: 39.9029°N 116.7362°E
- Operator: Beijing Mass Transit Railway Operation Corporation Limited
- Line: Line 6
- Platforms: 2 (1 island platform)
- Tracks: 2

Construction
- Structure type: Underground
- Accessible: Yes

History
- Opened: December 28, 2014; 11 years ago

Services
Preceding station	Beijing Subway	Following station
Haojia Fu towards Jin'anqiao	Line 6	Lucheng towards Luyang
Location
- Location within Beijing

Dongxia Yuan station (simplified Chinese: 东夏园站; traditional Chinese: 東夏園站; pinyin: Dōngxià Yuán Zhàn) is a station on Line 6 of the Beijing Subway. The construction of this station began on September 20, 2012, and was completed in 2014.

== Station layout ==
The station has an underground island platform.

== Exits ==
There are 3 exits, lettered A, B, and D. Exit B is accessible.
