= Chuxiong =

Chuxiong (Chinese: 楚雄; pinyin: Chǔxióng) may refer to:

- Chuxiong Yi Autonomous Prefecture (楚雄彝族自治州), in Yunnan, China
- Chuxiong City (楚雄市), prefecture seat of Chuxiong Yi Autonomous Prefecture, in Yunnan, China
