= Lucheng station =

Beijing Subway station

Lucheng 潞城
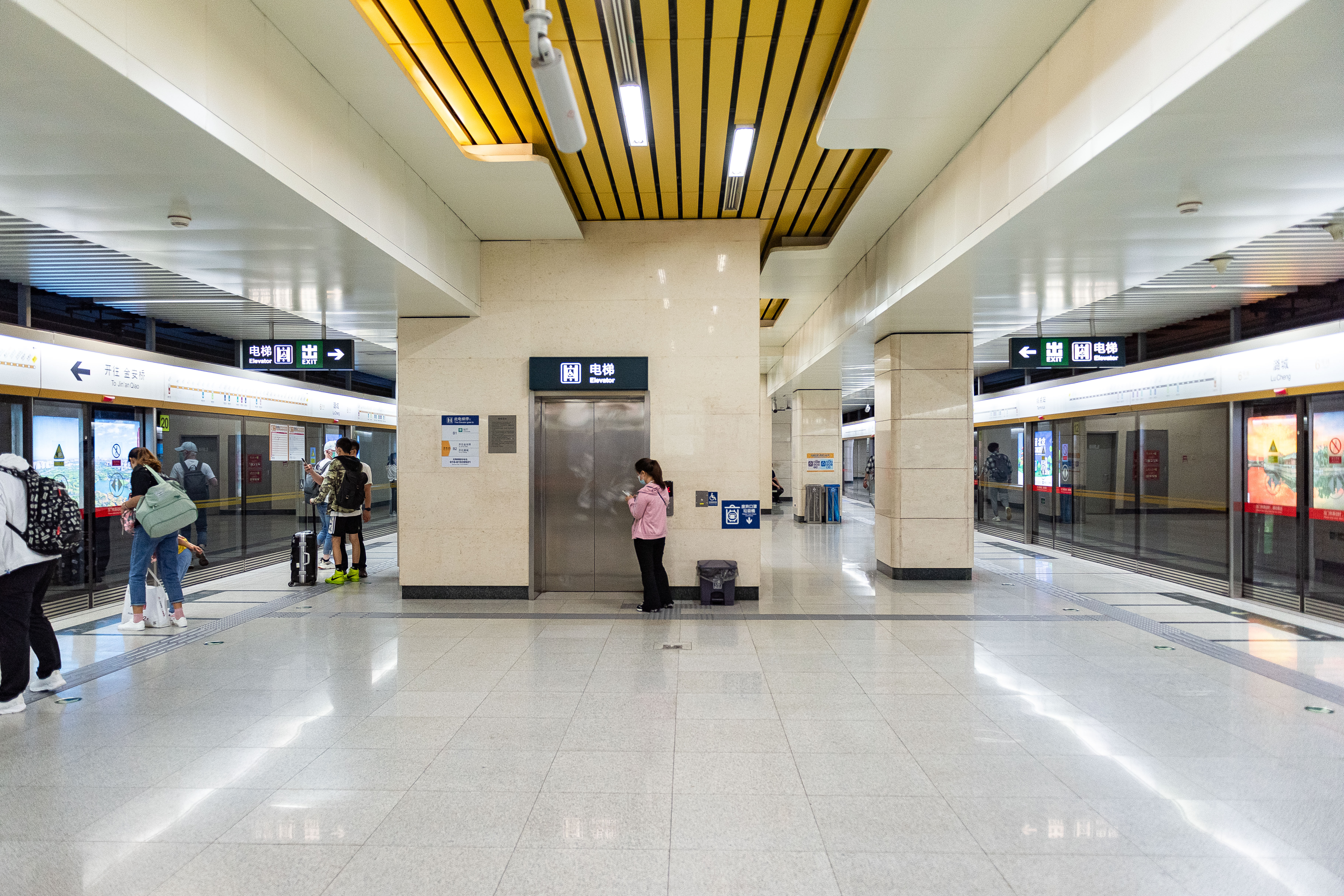
- Platform

General information
- Location: Lucheng, Tongzhou District, Beijing; China
- Coordinates: 39.902652°N 116.747434°E
- Operator: Beijing Mass Transit Railway Operation Corporation Limited
- Line: Line 6
- Platforms: 2 (1 island platform)
- Tracks: 2

Construction
- Structure type: Underground
- Accessible: Yes

History
- Opened: December 28, 2014; 11 years ago

Services
Preceding station	Beijing Subway	Following station
Dongxia Yuan towards Jin'anqiao	Line 6	Luyang Terminus
Location
- Location within Beijing

Lucheng station (Chinese: 潞城站; pinyin: Lùchéng zhàn) is a station on Line 6 of the Beijing Subway. It was the easternmost station in the Beijing Subway, before the opening of the southern extension to Luyang and Line 22 (Dingfuzhuang to Pinggu section open in 2026).

== History ==
The construction of this station began on September 20, 2012, and was completed in 2014.

== Location ==
This station is located in the Lucheng town in Tongzhou District, Beijing, after which it is named. It is only 3 km (1.9 mi) away from the border with Hebei province, specifically, the Yanjiao town in Sanhe, in the Northern Three Counties exclave. The east end of Lucheng station connects to Dongxiaoying depot.

== Station layout ==
The station has an underground island platform.

== Exits ==
There are 3 exits, lettered A, B, and D. Exit B is accessible.
