= Lucheng, Yunnan =

Lucheng 鹿城镇
- Town
- Location in Yunnan
- Coordinates: 25°02′16″N 101°33′13″E
- Country: People's Republic of China
- Province: Yunnan
- Autonomous prefecture: Chuxiong
- County-level city: Chuxiong
- Village-level divisions: 15 residential communities 6 villages
- Elevation: 1,785 m (5,856 ft)
- Time zone: UTC+8 (China Standard)
- Postal code: 675000
- Area code: 0878

Lucheng (Chinese: 鹿城; pinyin: Lùchéng) is a town and the seat of Chuxiong City, Yunnan, People's Republic of China. As of 2011, it has 15 residential communities (社区) and six villages under its administration.
