= Luyang station =

Beijing Subway Line 6 station

Luyang 潞阳
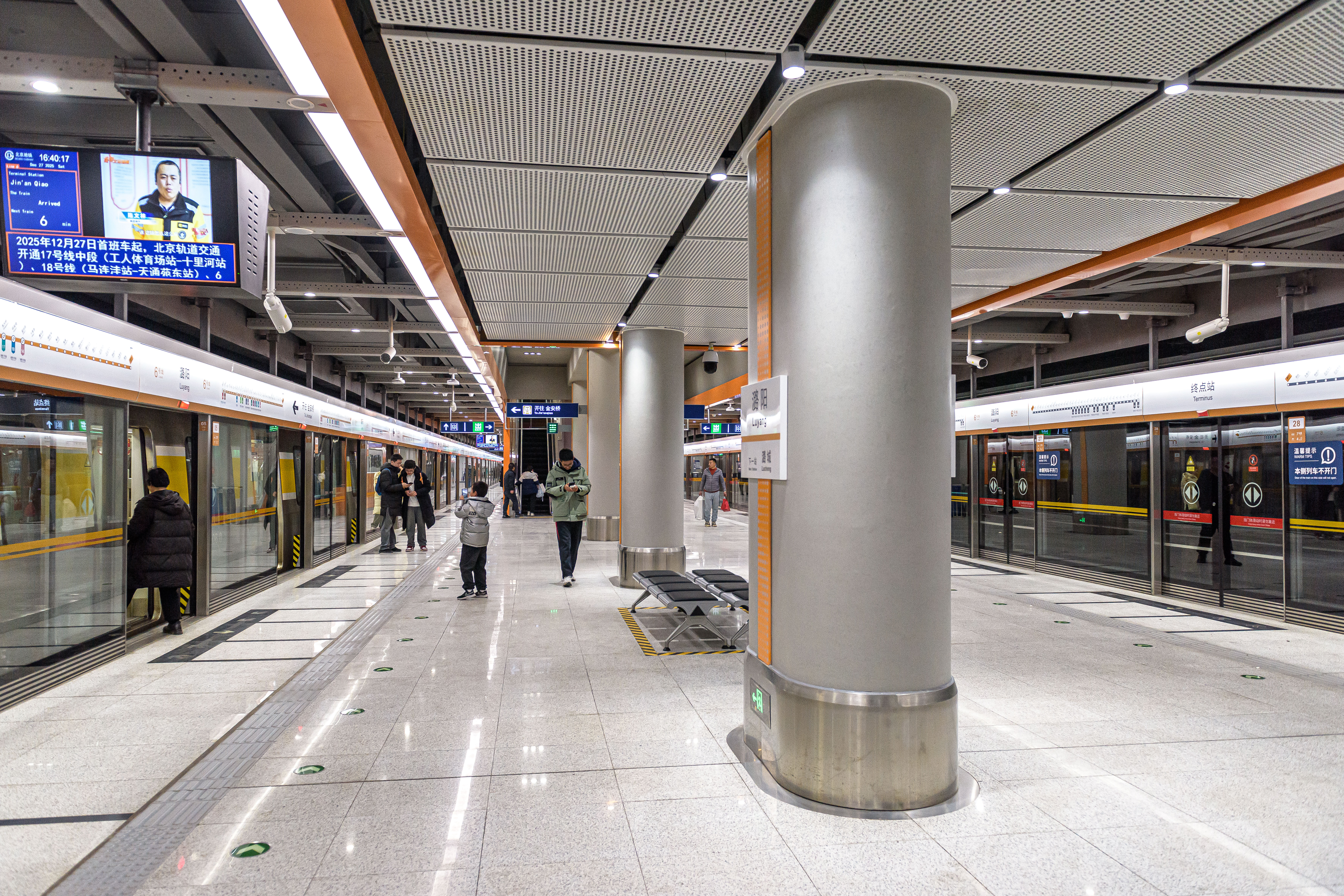
- Platform

Chinese name
- Simplified Chinese: 潞阳站
- Traditional Chinese: 潞陽站
Transcriptions
Standard Mandarin
- Hanyu Pinyin: Lùyáng Zhàn
- Wade–Giles: Lu^{4}-yang^{2} Chan^{4}

General information
- Location: North side of the intersection of Jianyun Road (减运路) and Luyang Street (潞阳大街); Lucheng Town, Tongzhou District, Beijing; China
- Coordinates: 39.88749°N 116.75064°E
- System: Beijing Subway
- Operator: Beijing Mass Transit Railway Operation Corporation Limited
- Line: Line 6
- Platforms: 2 (1 island platform)
- Tracks: 2

Construction
- Structure type: Underground
- Accessible: Yes

History
- Opened: December 27, 2025; 7 months ago

Services
| Preceding station | Beijing Subway | Following station |
|---|---|---|
| Lucheng towards Jin'anqiao | Line 6 | Terminus |
Location
- Location within Beijing

Luyang station (Chinese: 潞阳站; pinyin: Lùyáng zhàn) is a station and the eastern terminus of Line 6 of the Beijing Subway. It is located under the north side of the intersection of Jianyun Road and Luyang Street in Lucheng Town, Tongzhou District in Beijing. It opened on December 27, 2025. It currently serves as Beijing Subway's easternmost station before the opening of the Pinggu line (Line 22).

== Station features ==
The station has an underground island platform.

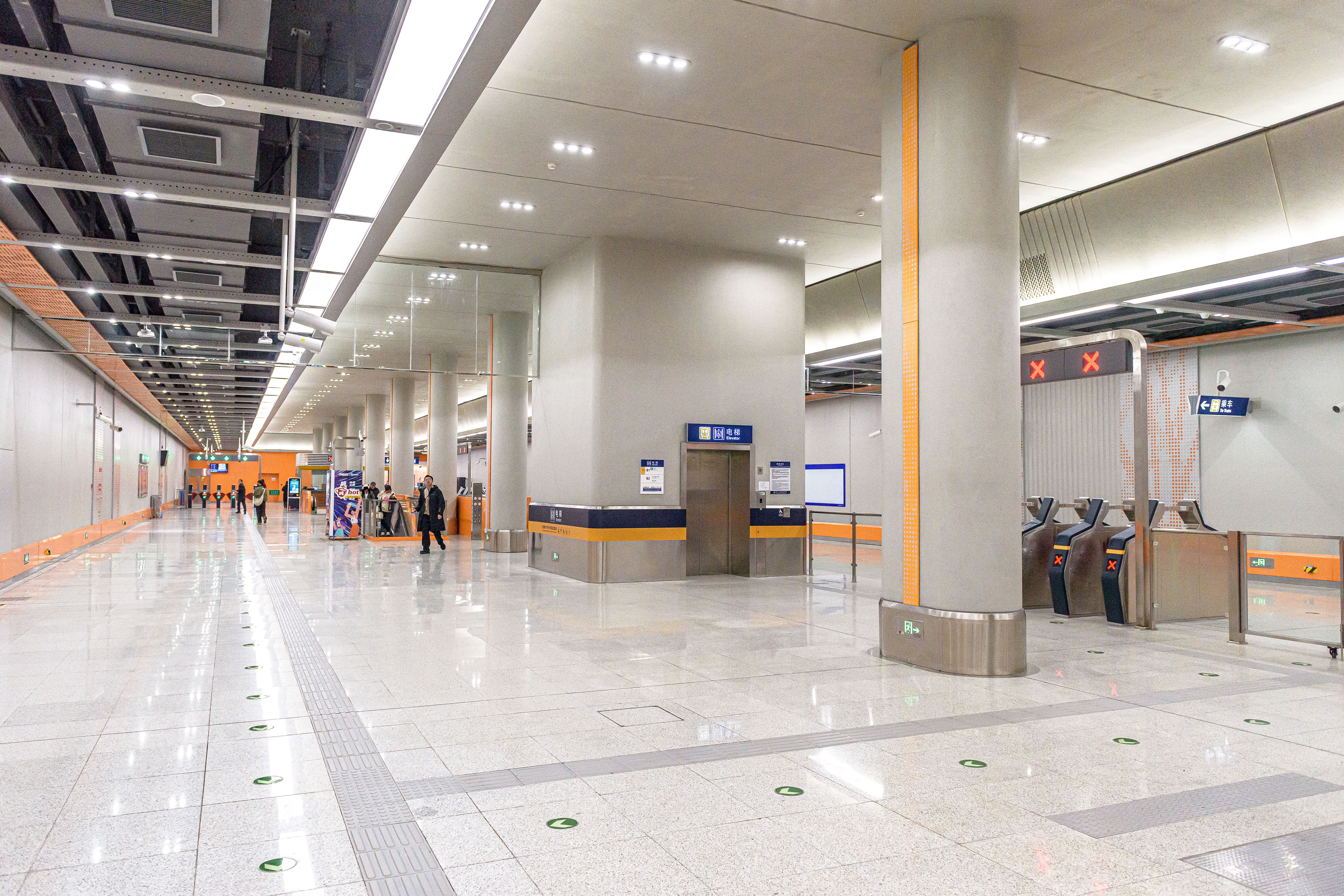
Concourse

=== Exits ===
The station has 3 exits, lettered B, C1 and C2. Exit B1 is accessible via an elevator.

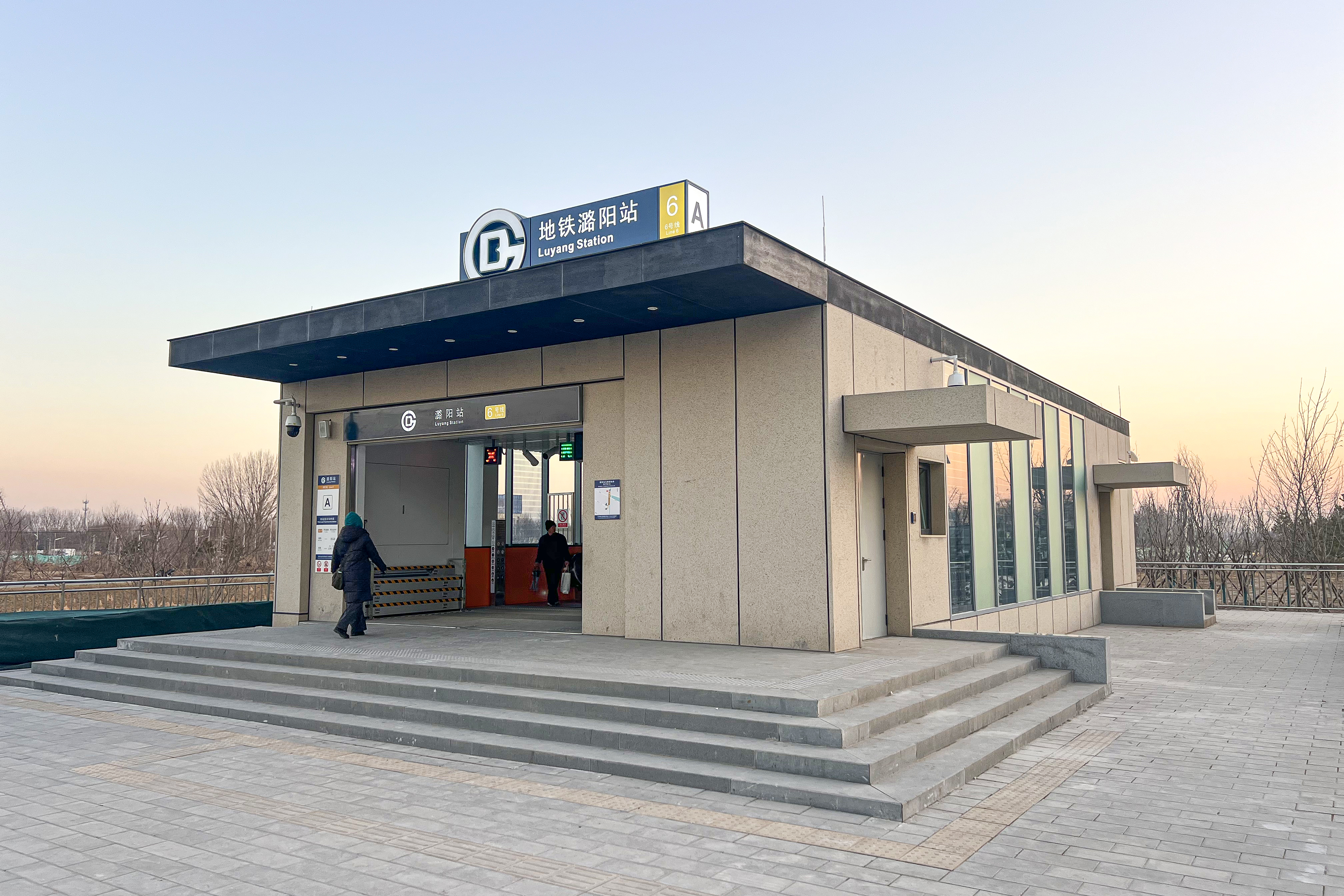
Exit A

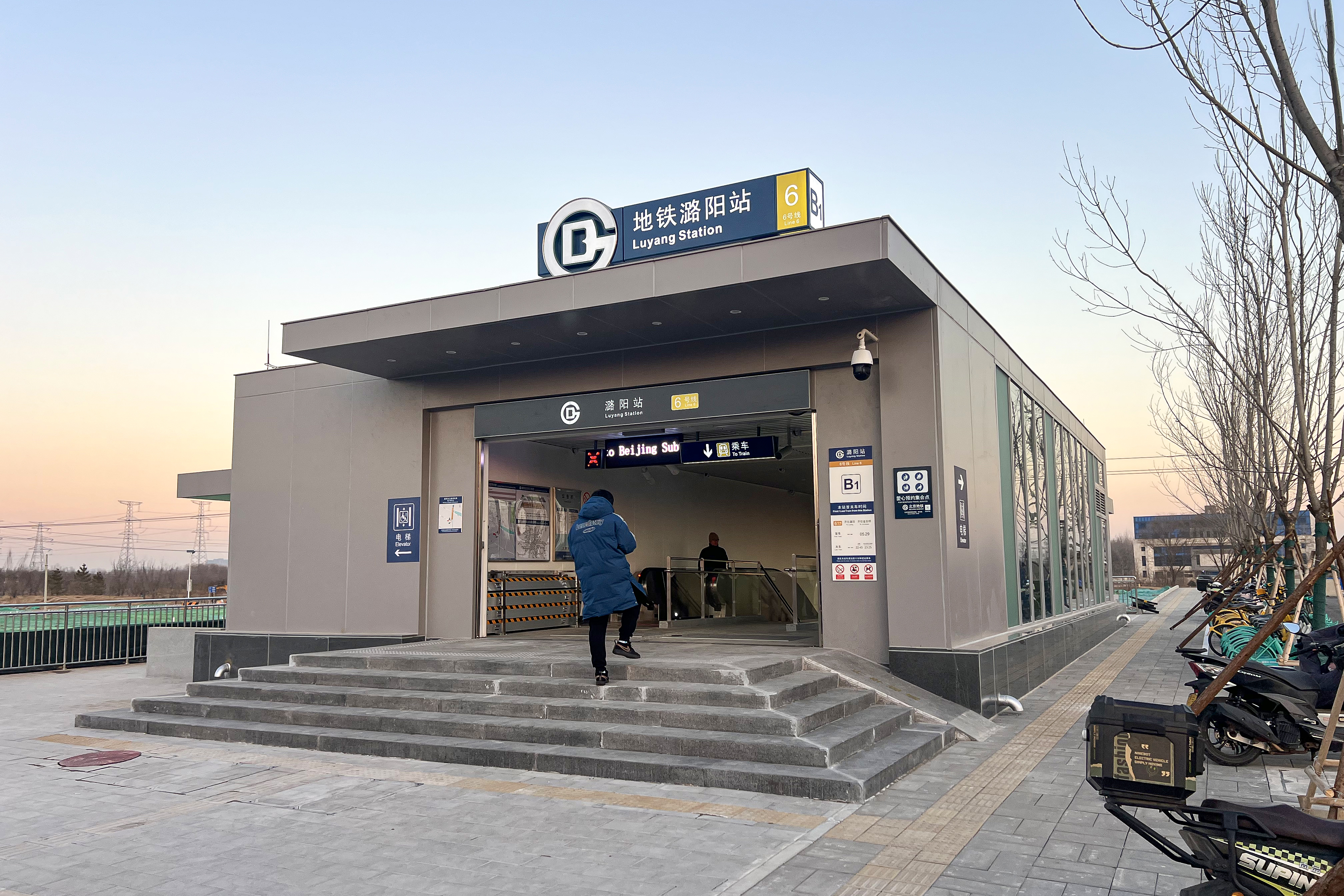
Exit B1

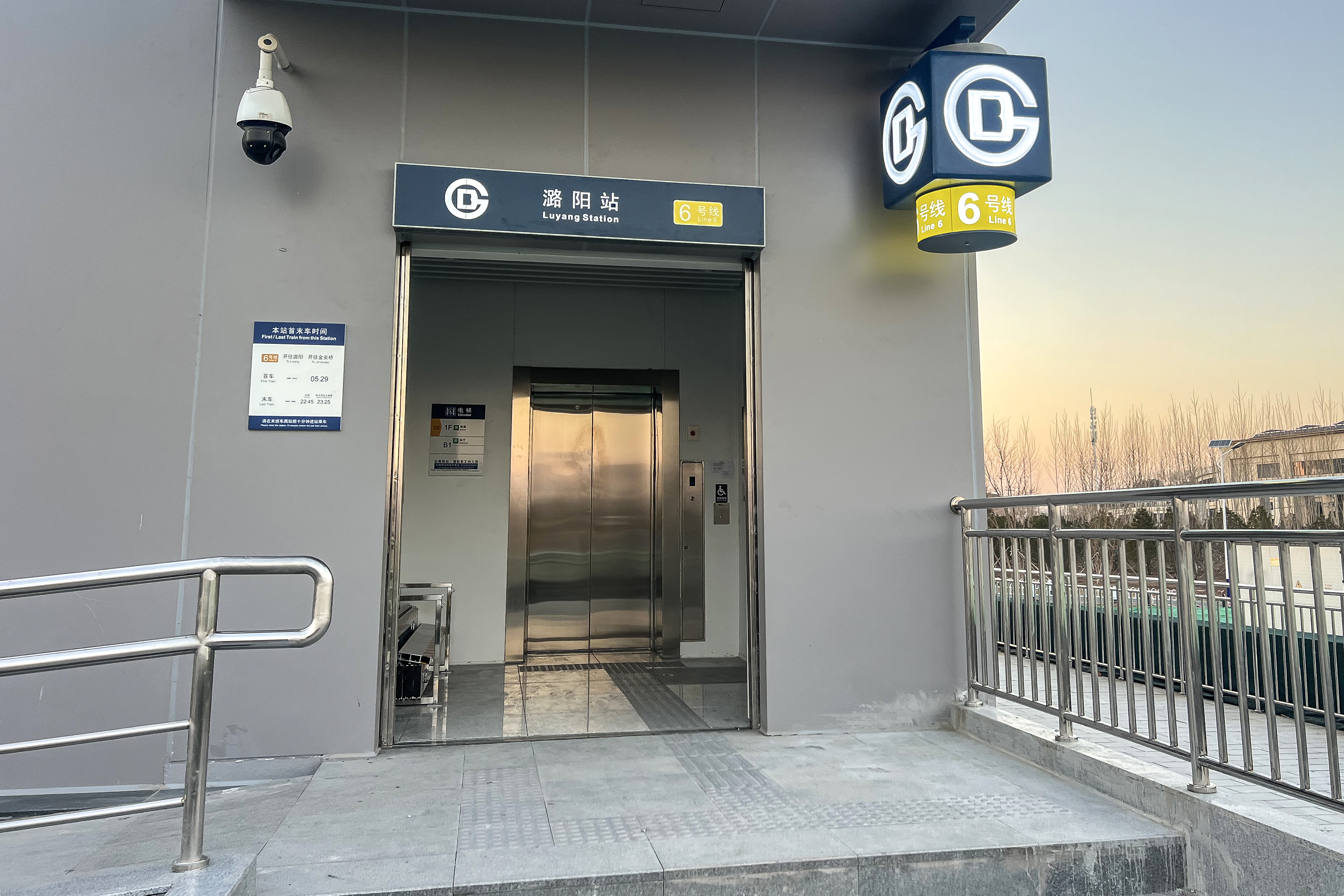
Exit B1 (elevator exit)

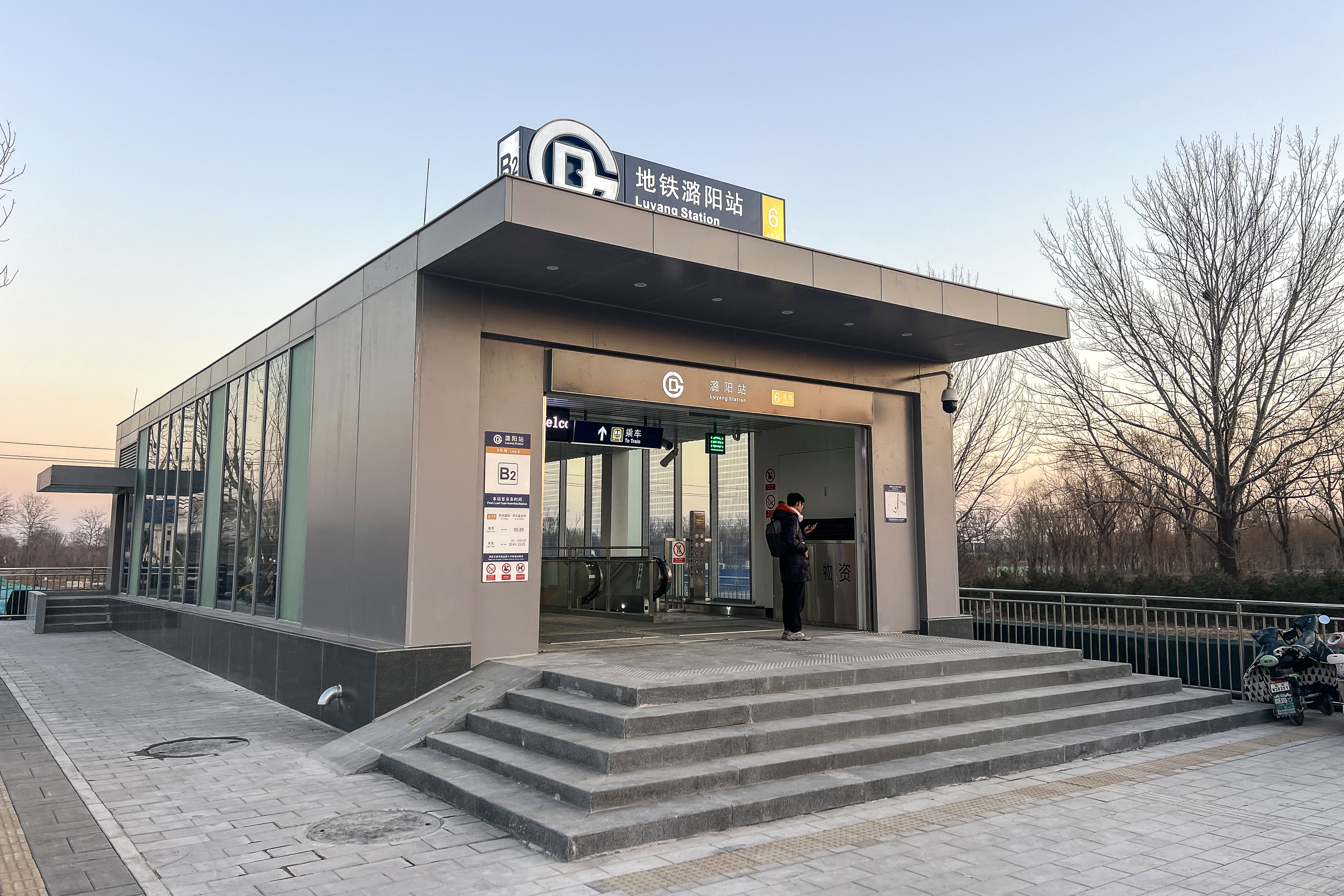
Exit B2

== History ==
- On November 8, 2021, the Beijing Infrastructure Investment Co., LTD released the first public notice of the environmental impact assessment for the Line 6 Southern Extension Project.
- On May 30, 2022, the China Academy of Railway Sciences released the second public announcement of the environmental impact assessment of the southern extension section of the Phase 2 project of Line 6.
- On August 30, 2022, the construction of the southern extension of Line 6 Phase 2 started.
- On January 3, 2025, the Beijing Municipal Commission of Planning and Natural Resources issued a “Public Notice on the Naming Plan for the Phase 2 (Southern Extension) station of Metro Line 6”, proposing to officially name the station Luyang station; the place name announcement issued on April 8 officially confirmed the name.

== Future Development ==
A southern extension to Tongzhou Dagantang is under planning. It is also known as Hulang Lu station (Chinese: 胡郎路站; pinyin: Húláng Lù zhàn; lit. 'Hulang Road station'), although Hulang Road is located closer to Luyang than Tongzhou Dagantang.
