= Chuxiong City =

Chuxiong 楚雄市 ·
- County-level city
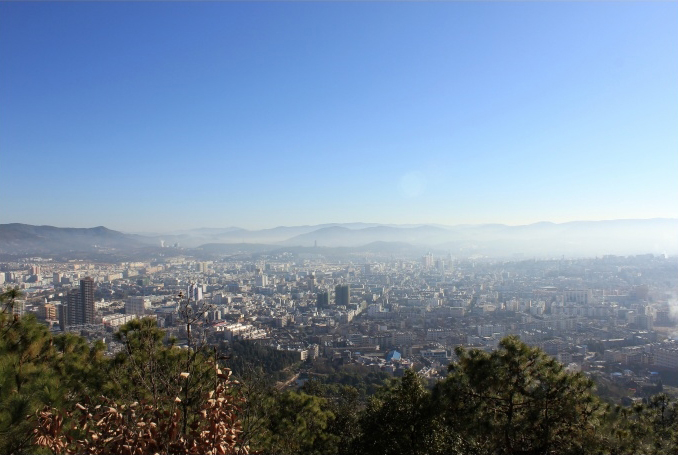
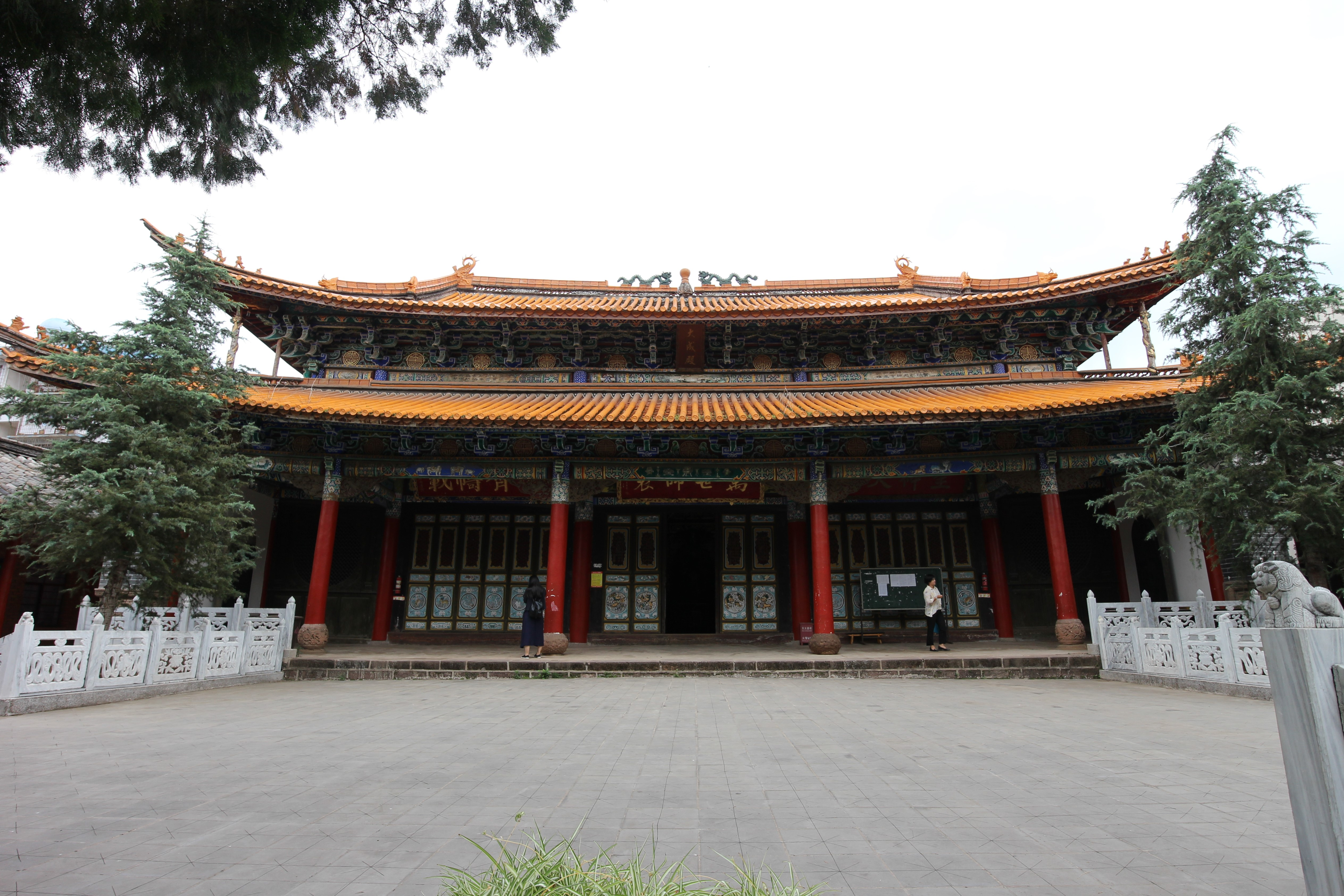
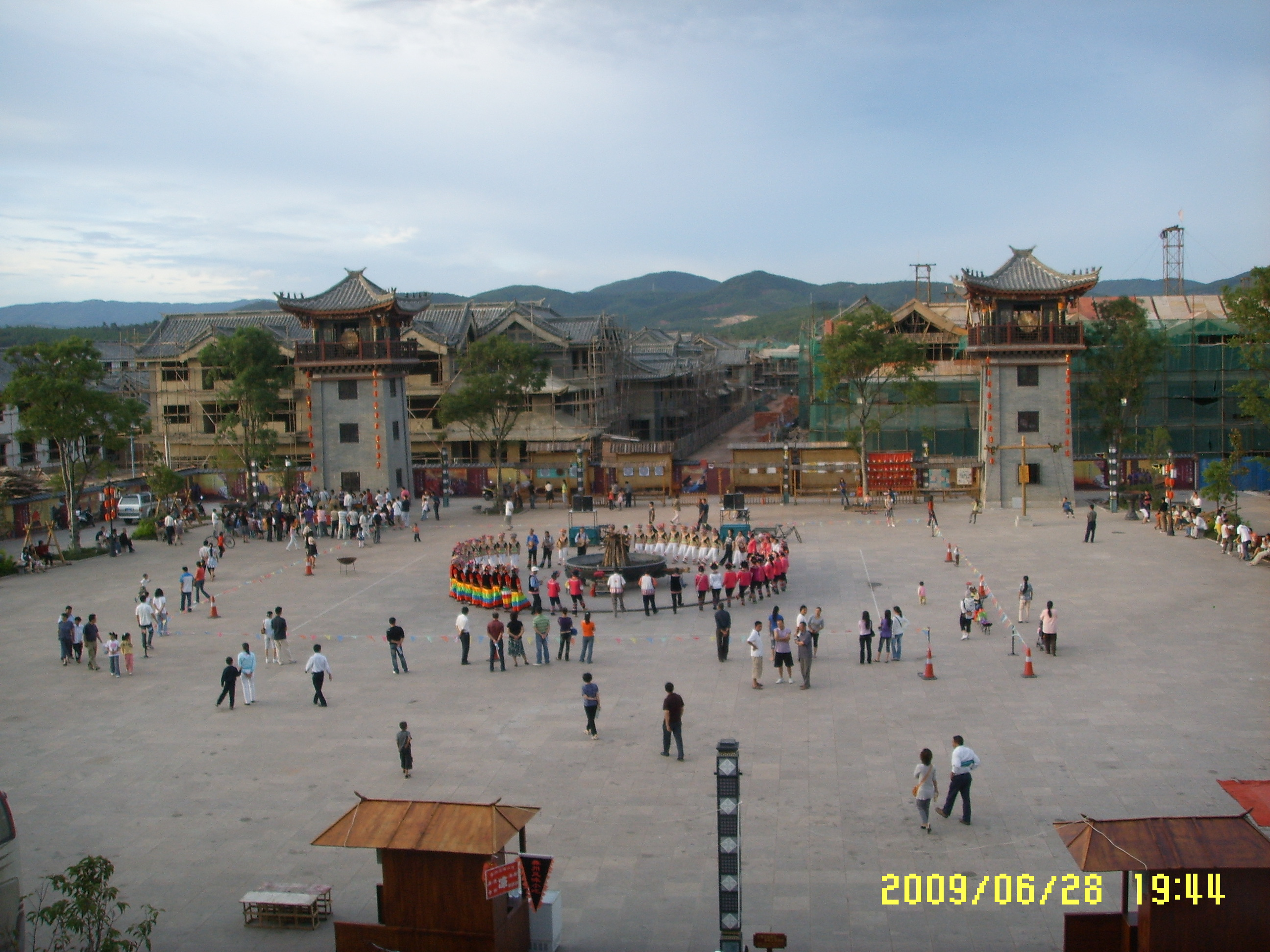
- Clockwise from top-left: Skyline of urban; Chuxiong confucian temple; Chuxiong Prefectural Museum; Square of Yi Ren Gu Zhen

- Location of Chuxiong City in Chuxiong Prefecture within Yunnan province

- Location in Yunnan Chuxiong (China)
- Coordinates (Chuxiong City government): 25°01′59″N 101°32′45″E
- Country: China
- Province: Yunnan
- Autonomous Prefecture: Chuxiong
- Municipal seat: Lucheng

Area
  - Total: 4,482 km^{2} (1,731 sq mi)
- Elevation: 1,779 m (5,837 ft)

Population (2020 census)
  - Total: 631,530
  - Density: 140.9/km^{2} (364.9/sq mi)
- Time zone: UTC+8 (China Standard)
- Postal code: 675000
- Area code: 0878
- Website: www.cxs.gov.cn

Chuxiong City (Chinese: 楚雄市; pinyin: Chǔxióng Shì; Chuxiong Yi Script:, IPA: /ɣo^{21} lu^{21} lu^{21}/) is a county-level city and the capital of the Chuxiong Yi Autonomous Prefecture, in Central Yunnan Province, China.

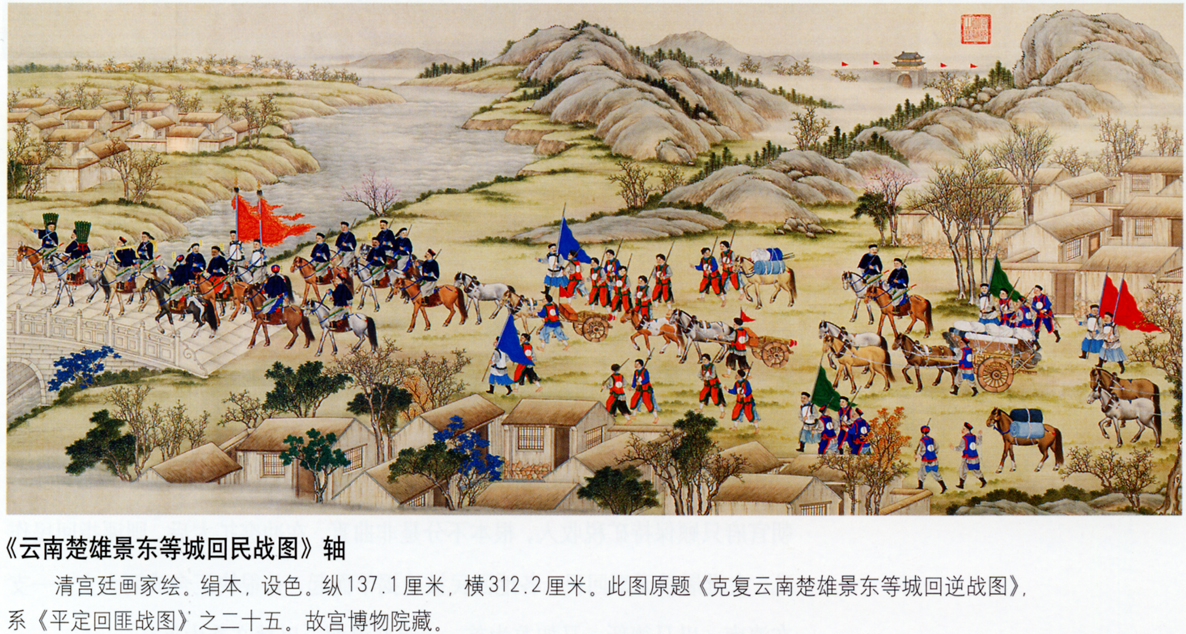
Capture of Chuxiong, Jingdong and other cities by the Qing Dynasty during the Panthay Rebellion.

Chuxiong City borders Lufeng to the east, Shuangbai County to the south, Nanhua County and Jingdong County to the west, and Mouding County to the north.

== Geography ==
Chuxiong is about 127 kilometres (79 mi) west of Yunnan's capital of Kunming on highway GZ65. Chuxiong City is nestled between mountain ranges on all sides in a plateau region at 5,800 feet (1,800 m). Chuxiong City has a population of 130,000 inhabitants and the entire Chuxiong Prefecture has an estimated 2,542,530 inhabitants. At the end of 2024, the resident population of the state was 2.327 million, and the urbanization rate of the resident population was 49.55%.

Chuxiong is located between Kunming and Dali, with Dali about 140 kilometres (87 mi) west of Chuxiong and Kunming about 120 km to the east. Lijiang is about a six-hour drive from Chuxiong, and Lugu Lake is about 11 hours north, on the Sichuan border.

== Administrative divisions ==
Chuxiong City has 12 towns and 3 townships.

12 towns

- Lucheng (鹿城镇)
- Donggua (东瓜镇)
- Luhe (吕合镇)
- Zixi (紫溪镇)
- Donghua (东华镇)
- Ziwu (子午镇)
- Cangling (苍岭镇)
- Sanjie (三街镇)
- Bajiao (八角镇)
- Zhongshan (中山镇)
- Xincun (新村镇)
- Xishelu (西舍路镇)

3 townships

- Shuju (树苴乡)
- Daguokou (大过口乡)
- Dadiji (大地基乡)

== Climate ==
Chuxiong experiences a mild dry-winter humid subtropical climate (Köppen climate classification: Cwa), bordering on a dry-winter subtropical highland climate (Köppen climate classification: Cwb). Winters are mild, dry and sunny, although average lows in January reach barely above freezing. Spring begins early and remains dry and sunny until late May, when there is a dramatic uptick in the frequency and amount of rainfall lasting until late September. Summers are warm, rainy and generally overcast, with June, the warmest month, averaging 21.4 °C (70.5 °F). Autumn sees an abrupt reduction in rainfall and a return to clear skies.

The annual mean temperature is 16.00 °C (60.8 °F), while precipitation averages at 890.7 mm (35.1 in) a year, more than 70% of which occurs from June to September. With monthly percent possible sunshine ranging from 28% in July to 70% in February, the city receives 2,177 hours of bright sunshine annually. December and January both have an all around average temperature of 8.7 °C (47.7 °F).

Climate data for Chuxiong, elevation 1,824 m (5,984 ft), (1991–2020 normals, extremes 1951–present)
Month	Jan	Feb	Mar	Apr	May	Jun	Jul	Aug	Sep	Oct	Nov	Dec	Year
Record high °C (°F)	27.2 (81.0)	27.2 (81.0)	30.0 (86.0)	33.4 (92.1)	33.6 (92.5)	34.2 (93.6)	31.4 (88.5)	31.9 (89.4)	31.0 (87.8)	28.4 (83.1)	26.9 (80.4)	25.6 (78.1)	34.2 (93.6)
Mean daily maximum °C (°F)	17.0 (62.6)	19.4 (66.9)	22.7 (72.9)	25.4 (77.7)	26.5 (79.7)	26.9 (80.4)	25.9 (78.6)	25.7 (78.3)	24.4 (75.9)	22.2 (72.0)	19.6 (67.3)	16.8 (62.2)	22.7 (72.9)
Daily mean °C (°F)	9.8 (49.6)	12.4 (54.3)	15.8 (60.4)	18.9 (66.0)	20.7 (69.3)	21.9 (71.4)	21.2 (70.2)	20.8 (69.4)	19.5 (67.1)	17.1 (62.8)	13.2 (55.8)	10.0 (50.0)	16.8 (62.2)
Mean daily minimum °C (°F)	3.9 (39.0)	6.2 (43.2)	9.6 (49.3)	13.1 (55.6)	16.1 (61.0)	18.3 (64.9)	18.3 (64.9)	17.7 (63.9)	16.4 (61.5)	13.8 (56.8)	8.6 (47.5)	4.9 (40.8)	12.2 (54.0)
Record low °C (°F)	−4.8 (23.4)	−3.7 (25.3)	−3.1 (26.4)	1.7 (35.1)	7.0 (44.6)	10.7 (51.3)	13.0 (55.4)	11.4 (52.5)	7.9 (46.2)	3.1 (37.6)	−2.9 (26.8)	−4.8 (23.4)	−4.8 (23.4)
Average precipitation mm (inches)	19.1 (0.75)	10.9 (0.43)	14.3 (0.56)	24.1 (0.95)	74.5 (2.93)	135.1 (5.32)	196.7 (7.74)	181.6 (7.15)	114.6 (4.51)	65.5 (2.58)	27.3 (1.07)	8.5 (0.33)	872.2 (34.32)
Average precipitation days (≥ 0.1 mm)	3.5	3.9	5.1	6.2	9.9	14.8	18.8	19.8	15.2	11.9	7.7	4.6	121.4
Average snowy days	0.4	0.1	0.2	0	0	0	0	0	0	0	0.1	0.2	1
Average relative humidity (%)	64	54	49	50	59	69	77	79	78	77	73	72	67
Mean monthly sunshine hours	229.1	222.0	249.0	231.4	213.9	147.9	117.3	130.2	123.6	151.9	168.5	192.3	2,177.1
Percentage possible sunshine	69	70	67	61	52	36	28	32	34	43	52	59	49
Source 1: China Meteorological Administration extremesall-time November record high
Source 2: Weather China

== Ethnic groups ==
=== The Yi People ===
Although the Yi People, Chuxiong's largest minority group, has the most historical presence in the area, the large majority of the population is now Han Chinese. The Yi people are still highly celebrated and maintain a large influence on the city's art and customs.

Chuxiong has two main Yi subgroups, namely Luoluopo 罗罗泼 (who speak Central Yi language) and Luowu 罗武 (who speak Eastern Yi language) (Chuxiong City Gazetteer 1993:145). The two main Miao subgroups are White Miao 白苗 and Flowery Miao 花苗.

The city also has a large presence of Bai and Hui people.

== Economy ==
=== Development Zone ===
- Chuxiong Economic Development Zone

Chuxiong Economic Development Zone is an important zone in Yunnan. Now the zone has attracted a number of investment projects. It is an important industry for the development of new-type industry platform. The zone covers an area of 12 square kilometres (4.6 sq mi), composed of four parks.

== Attractions ==
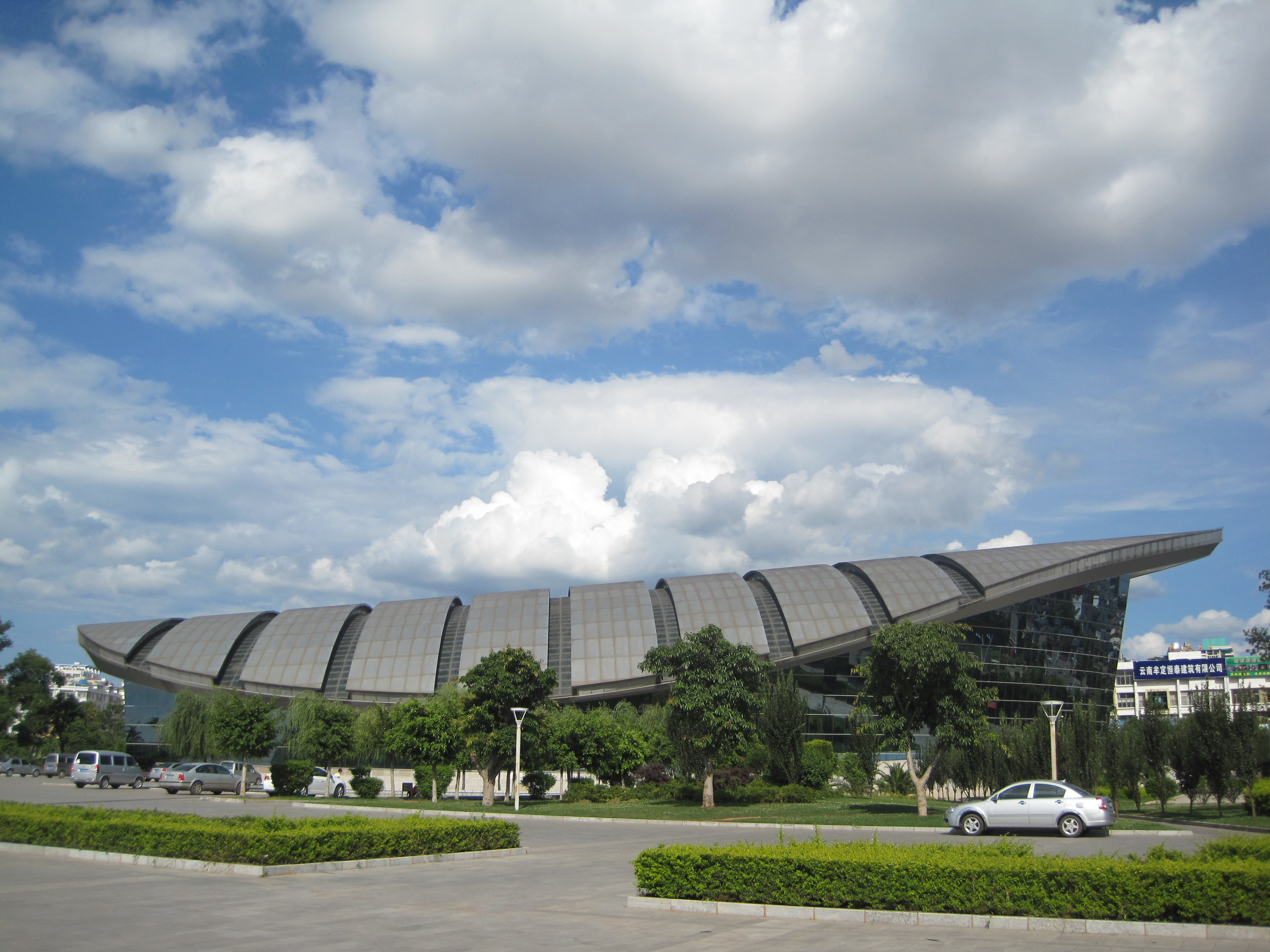
Chuxiong Aquatics center

- Yi Ren Gu Zhen ("Ancient Town of the Yi People") is an ancient town and tourist attraction in the northwestern "new town". There is nightly dancing and music with people of the Yi People (who are one of China's 55 ethnic minorities). The Yi people's authentic, hand-made garb can be purchased in this community, along with many other hand-made items.
- As of early 2007, the recently constructed Xin Long Jiang Guang Chang Mall features a Jack Jones clothing store, an Only clothing store, a Tissot retail store, and many other high-end items for sale. These international commercial outlets were nonexistent prior to 2007, and are most likely a sign of the prosperity of the city due to its central location between three major tourist attractions in Yunnan (Kunming, Dali, and Lijiang).
- The Chuxiong 10-Month Solar Calendar Cultural Park was completed in 1999.

== Transport ==
Chuxiong is served by the Guangtong-Dali Railway between Kunming and Dali.
