= Lucheng, Beijing =

Lucheng Town 潞城镇
- Town
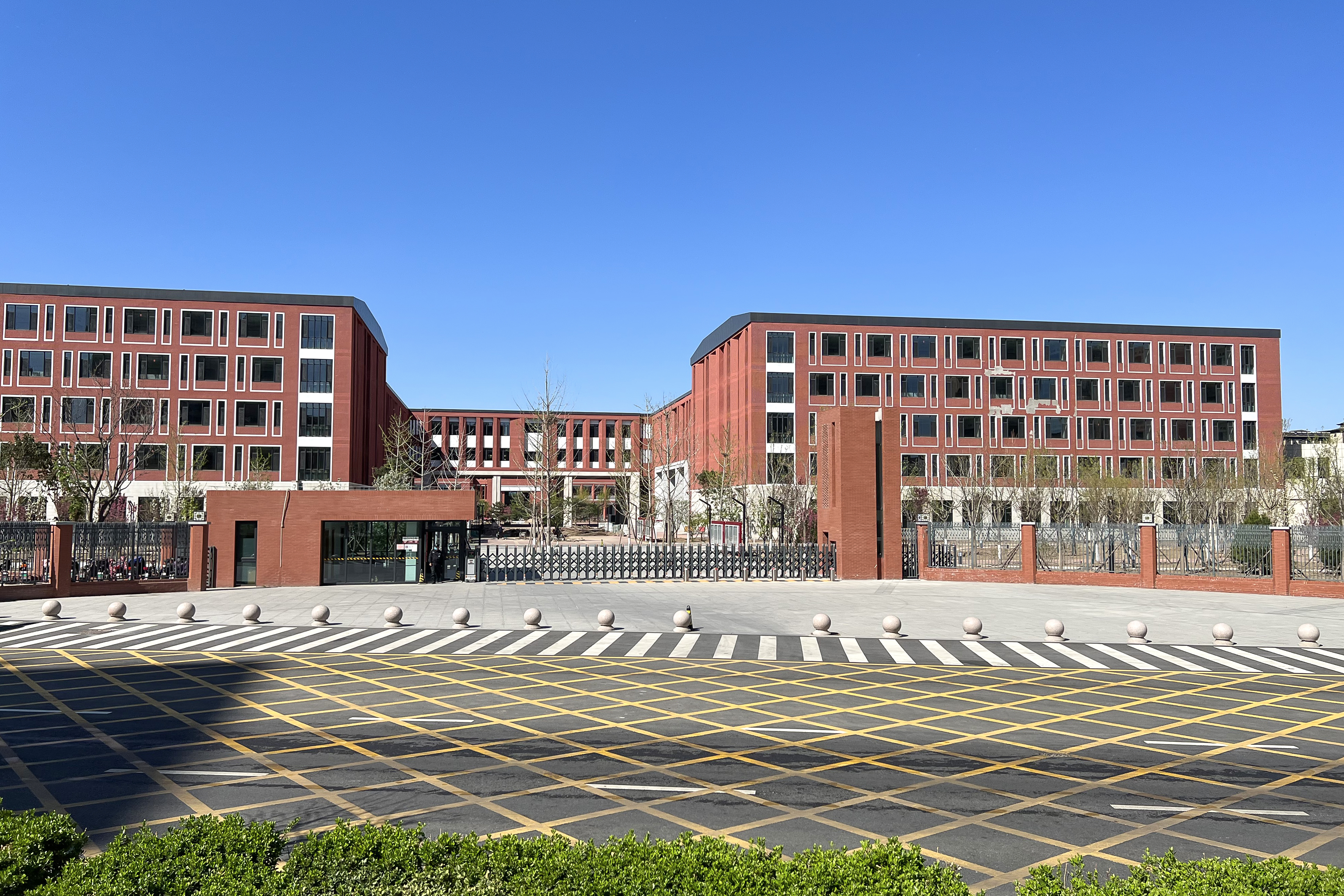
- Gate of Beijing School, 2022

- Location within Beijing Location within China
- Coordinates: 39°54′54″N 116°43′20″E
- Country: China
- Municipality: Beijing
- District: Tongzhou
- Village-level Divisions: 54 villages

Area
  - Total: 60.01 km^{2} (23.17 sq mi)
- Elevation: 24 m (79 ft)

Population (2020)
  - Total: 69,288
  - Density: 1,155/km^{2} (2,990/sq mi)
- Time zone: UTC+8 (China Standard)
- Postal code: 101117
- Area code: 010

Lucheng Town (Chinese: 潞城镇; pinyin: Lùchéng Zhèn) is a town of Tongzhou District in the eastern suburbs of Beijing, located 28 kilometers (17 mi) east of Tiananmen Square. It borders Songzhuang Town to the north, Chaobai River to the east, Xiji and Zhangjiawan Towns to the south, Yongshun Town, Luyuan and Luyi Subdistricts to the west. As of 2020, it had a population of 69,288.

The name Lucheng was inherited from Lu County that was first established during the Eastern Han dynasty.

== History ==
Timeline of Lucheng Town
Year	Status	Part of
1914 – 1936	3rd Autonomous District	Tong County
1936 – 1946	2nd Policing District	Tong County
1946 – 1948	Hugezhuang Township	Tong County
1948 – 1956	1st District	Tong County
1956 – 1958	Nanliu Township; Hugezhuang Township	Tong County
1958 – 1961	Part of Songezhuang People's Commune	Tong County
1961 – 1983	Hugezhuang People's Commune	Tong County
1983 – 1997	Hugezhuang Township	Tong County
1997 – 2000	Hugezhuang Township	Tongzhou District
2000 – 2001	Hugezhuang Town	Tongzhou District
2001–present	Lucheng Town (incorporated Gantang Town in 2001)	Tongzhou District

== Administration divisions ==
In 2021, Lucheng town was divided into 54 villages:

Administrative division code	Subdivision names	Name transliteration
110112119201	胡各庄	Hugezhuang
110112119202	魏庄	Weizhuang
110112119203	东杨庄	Dongyangzhuang
110112119204	霍屯	Huotun
110112119205	古城	Gucheng
110112119206	杨坨	Yangtuo
110112119207	郝家府	Haojiafu
110112119208	辛安屯	Xin'antun
110112119209	孙各庄	Sungezhuang
110112119210	后屯	Houtun
110112119211	常屯	Changtun
110112119212	召里	Zhaoli
110112119213	堡辛	Baoxin
110112119214	大台	Datai
110112119215	前北营	Qian Beiying
110112119216	后北营	Hou Beiying
110112119217	大营	Daying
110112119218	留庄	Liuzhuang
110112119219	东夏园	Dongxiayuan
110112119220	庙上	Miaoshang
110112119221	东小营	Dongxiaoying
110112119222	西堡	Xipu
110112119223	东堡	Dongpu
110112119224	七级	Qiji
110112119225	黎辛庄	Lixinzhuang
110112119226	南刘各庄	Nan Liugezhuang
110112119227	八各庄	Bagezhuang
110112119228	侉店	Kuadian
110112119229	后榆	Houyu
110112119230	前榆林庄村	Qian Yulinzhuang Cun
110112119231	贾后疃	Jiahoutuan
110112119232	东前营	Dongqianying
110112119233	前疃	Qiantuan
110112119234	卜落垡	Buluofa
110112119235	东刘庄	Dongliuzhuang
110112119236	大甘棠	Dagantang
110112119237	小甘棠	Xiaogantang
110112119238	岔道	Chadao
110112119239	凌家庙村	Lingjiamiao Cun
110112119240	武疃	Wutuan
110112119241	李疃	Lituan
110112119242	燕山营	Yanshanying
110112119243	兴各庄	Xinggezhuang
110112119244	肖庄	Xiaozhuang
110112119245	大豆各庄	Da Dougezhuang
110112119246	小豆各庄	Xiao Dougezhuang
110112119247	武窑	Wuyao
110112119248	夏店	Xiadian
110112119249	崔家楼村	Cuijialou Cun
110112119250	大东各庄	Da Donggezhuang
110112119251	小东各庄	Xiao Donggezhuang
110112119252	谢楼	Xielou
110112119253	康各庄	Kanggezhuang
110112119254	太子府	Taizifu

== See also ==
- List of township-level divisions of Beijing
