= Beijing Subway =

Rapid transit system in China

Coordinates: 39.9138°N 116.3916°E

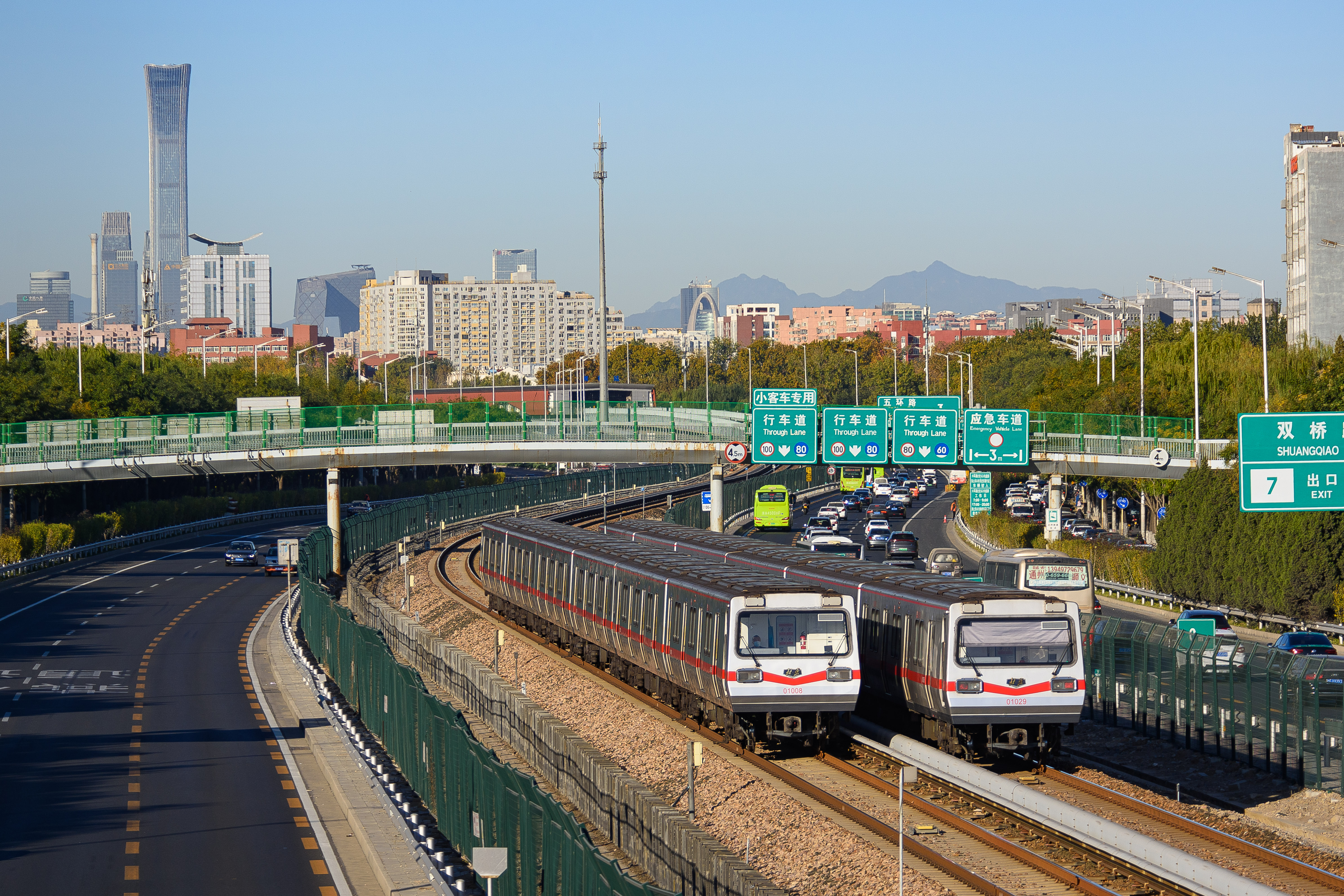
- Line 1 trains east of the Beijing central business district

Overview
- Owner: Beijing Municipal Government
- Locale: Beijing & Langfang, Hebei
- Transit type: Rapid transit
- Number of lines: 30
- Number of stations: 401 (Note: Using the same counting method of the London Underground); 541 (Note: Total including multiple-counted interchanges, out-of-fare airway lines and stations, and tram stops)
- Daily ridership: 9.46 million (2023 daily avg.); 13.75 million (July 12, 2019, record)
- Annual ridership: 3.45 billion (2023)
- Website: bjsubway.com mtr.bj.cn/en bjmoa.cn

Operation
- Began operation: January 15, 1971; 55 years ago
- Operators: Beijing Mass Transit Railway Operation Corp., Ltd.; Beijing MTR Corp., Ltd.; Beijing Metro Operation Administration (BJMOA) Corp., Ltd.; Beijing Public Transit Tramway Co., Ltd.; Beijing Capital Metro Corp., Ltd.
- Character: Underground, at grade and elevated
- Number of vehicles: 6,173 Revenue Railcars (2019)

Technical
- System length: 909 km (565 mi)
- Track gauge: 1,435 mm (4 ft 8 1/2 in) standard gauge
- Electrification: 1,500 V DC from overhead catenary (lines 3, 6, 11, 12, 14, 16, 17 and 19) or from third rail (line 7); 25 kV 50 Hz AC from overhead catenary (Daxing Airport Express); 750 V DC from overhead catenary (Xijiao line) or from third rail (other lines)
System map

Beijing Subway
- Simplified Chinese: 北京地铁
- Traditional Chinese: 北京地鐵
Transcriptions
Standard Mandarin
- Hanyu Pinyin: Běijīng Dìtiě
- Bopomofo: ㄅㄟˇ ㄐㄧㄥ ㄉㄧˋ ㄊㄧㄝˇ
- Wade–Giles: Pei^{3}-ching^{1} Ti^{4}-t‘ieh^{3}
- IPA: [pèɪ.tɕíŋ.tî.tʰjè]
Hakka
- Pha̍k-fa-sṳ: Pet-kîn Thi-thiet
Yue: Cantonese
- Yale Romanization: Bākgīng Deihtit
- Jyutping: bak1 ging1 dei6 tit3
- IPA: [pɐk̚˥.kɪŋ˥.tej˨.tʰit̚˧]
Southern Min
- Hokkien POJ: Pak-kiaⁿ Tē-thih
- Teochew Peng'im: bag^{4} gian^{1} di^{7} tih^{4}
Eastern Min
- Fuzhou BUC: Báe̤k-gĭng Dê-tiék

The Beijing Subway is the rapid transit system of Beijing Municipality that consists of 30 lines including 25 rapid transit lines, two airport rail links, one maglev line and two light rail tram lines, and 541 stations. The rail network extends 909 km (565 mi) across 12 urban and suburban districts of Beijing and into one district of Langfang in neighboring Hebei province. In December 2023, Beijing Subway became the world's longest metro system by route length, surpassing the Shanghai Metro. With 3.8484 billion trips delivered in 2018 (10.544 million trips per day) and single-day ridership record of 13.7538 million set on July 12, 2019, the Beijing Subway was the world's busiest metro system in the years immediately prior to the outbreak of the COVID-19 pandemic.

The Beijing Subway opened in 1971 and is the oldest metro system in China and on the mainland of East Asia. Before the system began its rapid expansion in 2002, the subway had only two lines. As the existing network still cannot adequately meet the city's mass transit needs, the Beijing Subway's extensive expansion plans call for 998.5 km (620.4 mi) of lines serving a projected 18.5 million trips every day upon the completion of the Phase 2 Construction Plan. The most recent expansion came into effect on December 27, 2025, with the opening of Line 18 and extensions of Line 6 and Line 17.

== Fares ==
=== Fare schedules ===
Single-ride fare
The Beijing Subway charges single-ride fare according to trip distance for all lines except the two airport express lines.

- For all lines except the two airport express lines, fares start at ¥3 for a trip up to 6 km in distance, with ¥1 added for the next 6 km, for every 10 km thereafter until the trip distance reaches 32 km, and for every 20 km beyond the first 32 km. A 40 km trip would cost ¥7.
- The Capital Airport Express has a fixed fare of ¥25 per ride.
- The Daxing Airport Express is the only line to maintain class-based fares with standard class fare varying with distance from ¥10 to ¥35 and business class fare fixed at ¥50 per ride.

Same-station transfers are free on all subway lines except the two Airport Express lines and the Xijiao and Yizhuang T1 tram lines, which require the purchase of a new fare when transferring to or from those lines.

Fare free riders
Children below 1.3 metres (51 in) in height ride for free when accompanied by a paying adult. Senior citizens over the age of 65, individuals with physical disabilities, retired revolutionary cadres, police and army veterans, military personnel and People's Armed Police can ride the subway for free.

Unlimited-rides fare
Since January 20, 2019, riders can purchase unlimited rides fare tickets using the Yitongxing (亿通行; lit. 'One Hundred Million Rides') app on smartphones, which generates a QR code with effective periods of one to seven days.

Distance-based single-ride fare schedule
Fare	Trip distance
¥3	<6 km
¥4	6–12 km
¥5	12–22 km
¥6	22–32 km
¥7	32–52 km
¥8	52–72 km
¥9	72–92 km
¥10	92–112 km

Unlimited-rides fare schedule
Period	Price
1 day	¥20
2 days	¥30
3 days	¥40
5 days	¥70
7 days	¥90

Previous fare schedules
On December 28, 2014, the Beijing Subway switched from a fixed-fare schedule to the current distance-based fare schedule for all lines except the Capital Airport Express. Prior to the December 28, 2014, fare increase, passengers paid a flat rate of RMB(¥) 2.00 (including unlimited fare-free transfers) for all lines except the Capital Airport Express, which cost ¥25, The flat fare was the lowest among metro systems in China. Before the flat fare schedule was introduced on October 7, 2007, fares ranged from ¥3 to ¥7, depending on the line and number of transfers.

=== Fare collection ===
Each station has two to fifteen ticket vending machines. Ticket vending machines on all lines can add credit to Yikatong cards. Single-ride tickets take the form of an RFID-enabled flexible plastic card.

Discounts for Yikatong card users
Monthly expenditure	Net expenditure after credit rebate	Net discount
¥50	¥50	0%
¥100	¥100	0%
¥150	¥140	6.67%
¥200	¥165	17.5%
¥250	¥190	24%
¥300	¥215	28.3%
¥350	¥240	31.4%
¥400	¥265	33.75%
¥450	¥315	30%
¥500	¥365	27%

Passengers must insert the ticket or scan the card at the gate both before entering and exiting the station. The subway's fare collection gates accept single-ride tickets and the Yikatong fare card. Passengers can purchase tickets and add credit to Yikatong card at ticket counters or vending machines in every station. The Yikatong, also known as Beijing Municipal Administration & Communication Card (BMAC), is an integrated circuit card that stores credit for the subway, urban and suburban buses and e-money for other purchases. The Yikatong card itself must be purchased at the ticket counter. To enter a station, the Yikatong card must have a minimum balance of ¥3.00. Upon exiting the system, single-ride tickets are inserted into the turnstile, which are reused by the system.

To prevent fraud, passengers are required to complete their journeys within four hours upon entering the subway. If the four-hour limit is exceeded, a surcharge of ¥3 is imposed. Each Yikatong card is allowed to be overdrawn once. The overdrawn amount is deducted when credits are added to the card.

Yikatong card users who spend more than ¥100 on subway fare in a calendar month will receive credits to their card the following month. After reaching ¥100 of spending in one calendar month, 20% of any further spending up to ¥150 will be credited. When spending exceeds ¥150, 50% of any further spending up to ¥250 will be credited. Once expenditures exceed ¥400, further spending won't earn any more credits. The credits are designed to ease commuters' burdens of fare increases.

Beginning in June 2017, single-journey tickets could be purchased via a phone app. A May 2018 upgrade allowed entrance via scanning a QR code from the same app.

As of January 2025, passengers may directly tap the contactless payment card (including international credit cards) to ride the subway. For JCB cardholders, only cards issued outside Mainland China are available for tap to ride.

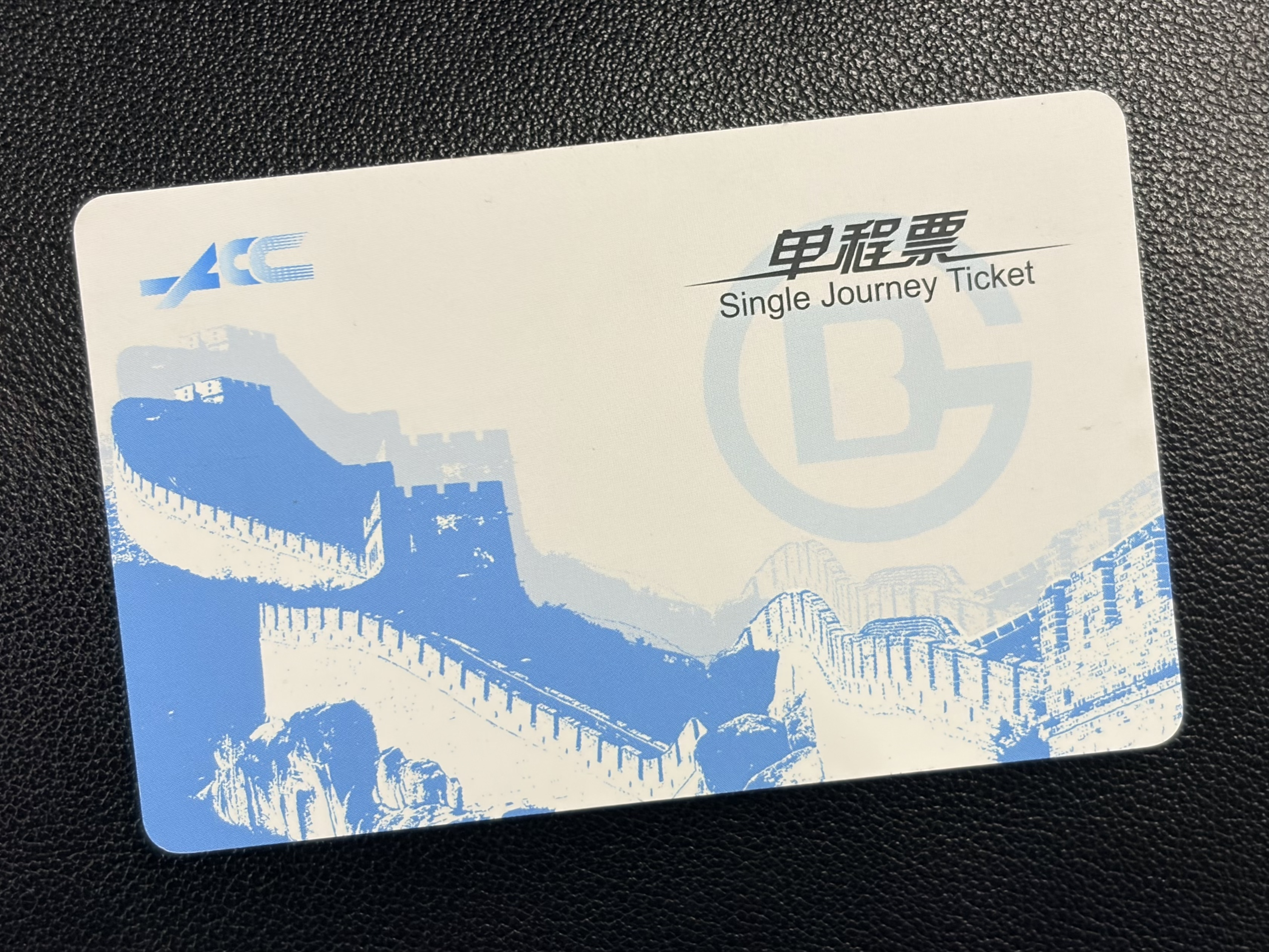
Single journey ticket

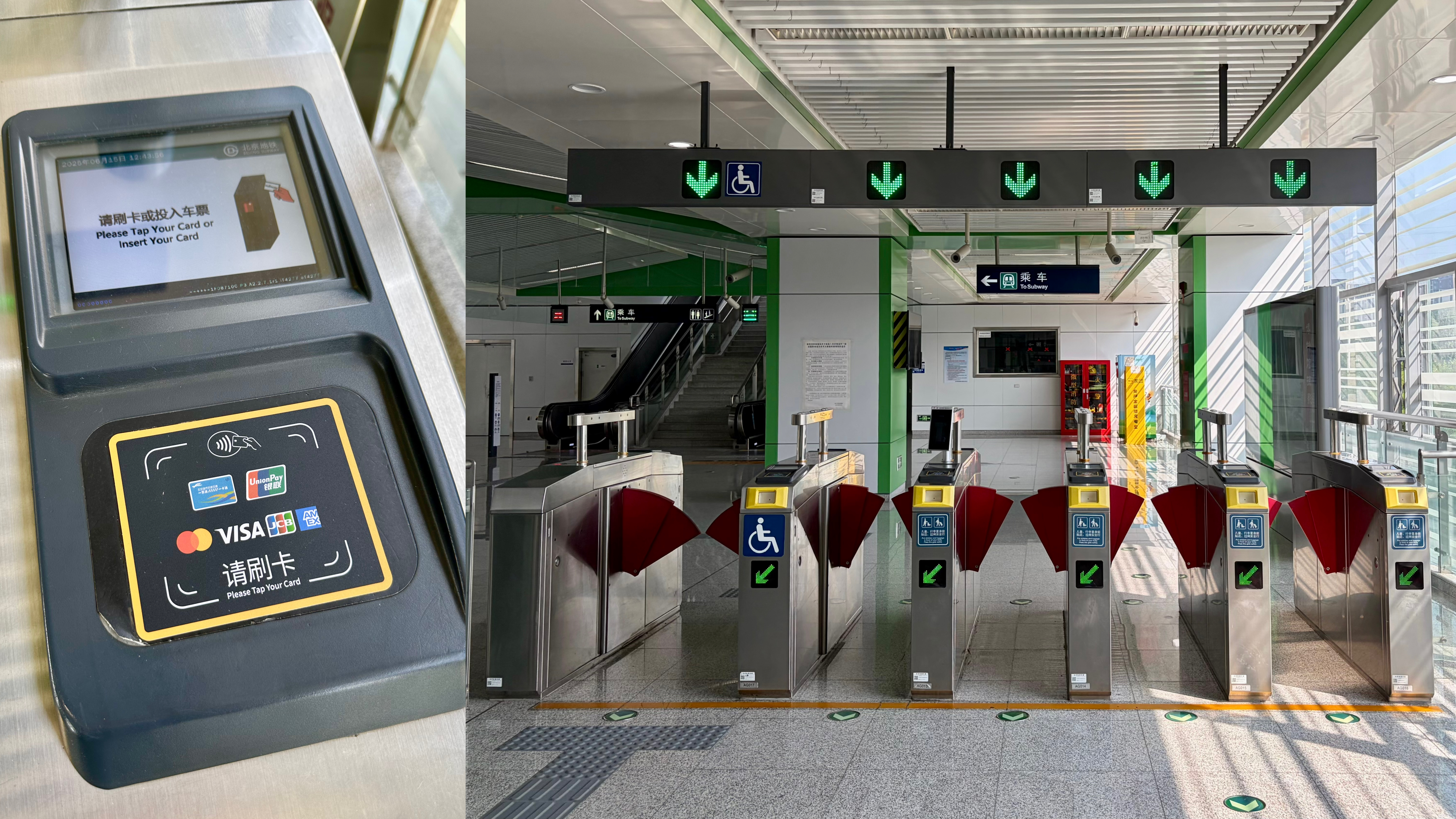
Faregates. "Tap & Go" is now available

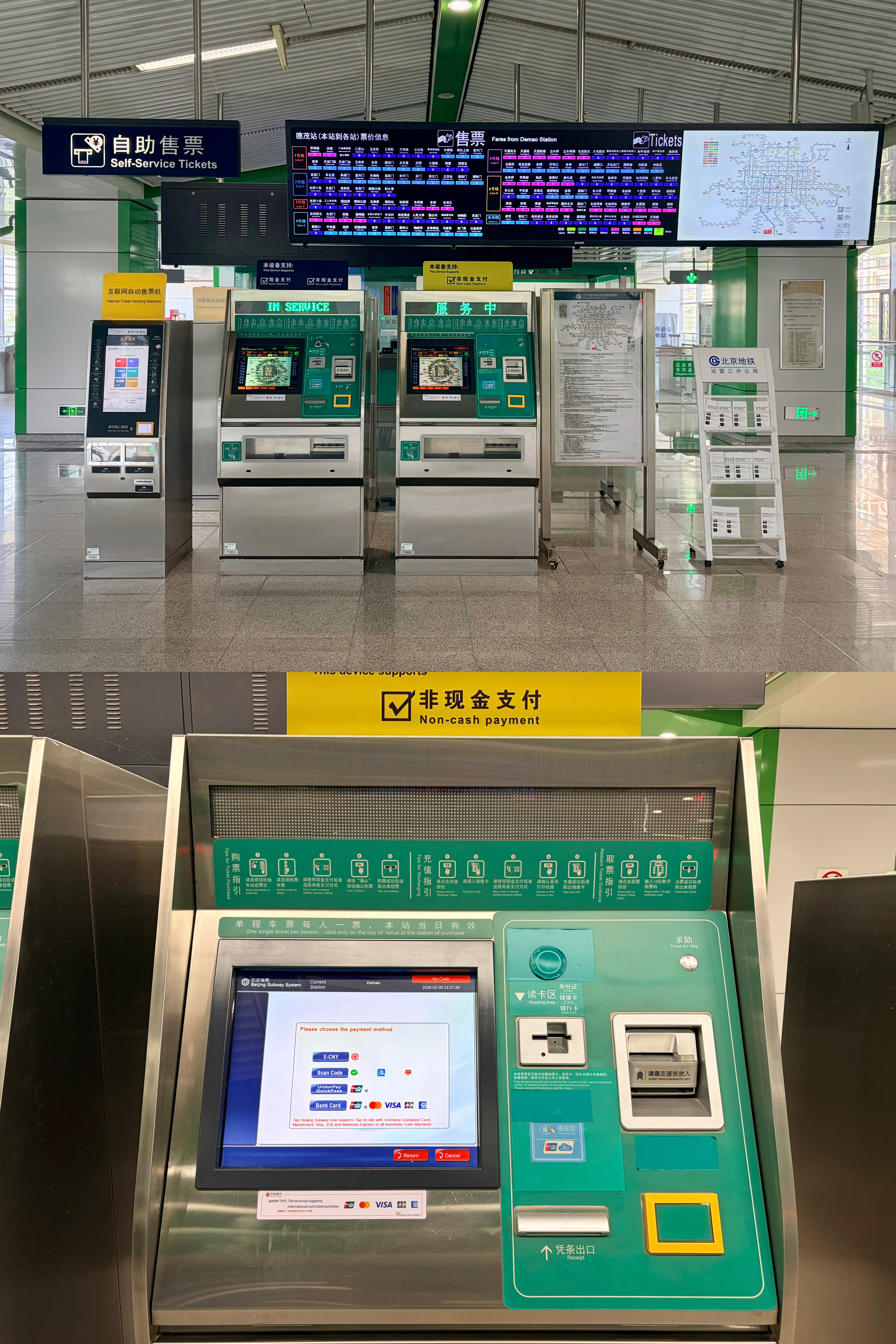
Ticket vending machine, which takes cash, bank cards, and QR code payments

== Lines in operation ==
Beijing Subway lines generally follow the checkerboard layout of the city. Most lines through the urban core (outlined by the Line 10 loop) run parallel or perpendicular to each other and intersect at right angles.

Schematic map of Beijing Subway lines in operation. (Not to scale)

Line Name	Terminals (District)		Opened	Newest Ext.	Length km	Stations (# above ground)	Connections	Rolling Stock	Operator	Code
& (Note: Through operation of Line 1 and Batong line started on August 29, 2021.)	Pingguoyuan (Shijingshan)	Universal Resort (Tongzhou)	January 15, 1971 ̣(Line 1) (Note: Construction finished in 1969, but the line was not opened to the public until 1971) December 27, 2003 (Batong Line)	June 28, 2000 (Line 1) August 26, 2021 (Batong Line)	50.9	36 (13)	2 4 5 6 7 8 9 10 14 16 17 19	6-car Type B		M1
loop line	Xizhimen (Xicheng)	Jishuitan (Xicheng)	September 20, 1984	December 28, 1987	23.1	18	1 3 4 5 6 8 13 19	6-car Type B		M2
	Dongsi Shitiao (Dongcheng)	Dongbabei (Chaoyang)	December 15, 2024	—	14.7	10	2 10 12 14 17	4-car Type A (Note: Lines 3, 11 and 12 currently operate shorter Type A trains but have platforms built to accommodate full-length trains (8-car for Lines 3 and 12; 6-car for Line 11) when demand warrants.)		M3
& (Note: With the opening of the Daxing Line on December 30, 2010 the Beijing MTR Corporation operates service on Lines 4 and Daxing as follows: ** A service that covers both lines, from Anheqiaobei, the northern terminus of Line 4, to Tiangong Yuan, the southern terminus of the Daxing Line. ** A service that covers Line 4 plus one stop on the Daxing Line, from Anheqiaobei to Xingong, the northernmost stop on the Daxing Line. Travelers wishing to proceed further south on the Daxing Line have to switch to a south-bound full-route train.)	Anheqiaobei (Haidian)	Tiangong Yuan (Daxing)	September 28, 2009 (Line 4) December 30, 2010 (Daxing Line)	—	49.4	35 (2)	1 2 6 7 9 10 12 13 14 16 19	6-car Type B		M4
	Tiantongyuanbei (Changping)	Songjiazhuang (Fengtai)	October 7, 2007	—	27.6	23 (7)	1 2 6 7 10 12 13 14 15 18 Capital Airport	6-car Type B		M5
	Jin'anqiao (Shijingshan)	Luyang (Tongzhou)	December 30, 2012	December 27, 2025	55.2	36	2 4 5 8 9 10 11 14 16 17 19 S1	8-car Type B		M6
	Beijing West railway station (Fengtai)	Universal Resort (Tongzhou)	December 28, 2014	August 26, 2021	40.3	30	1 4 5 8 9 10 14 16 17	8-car Type B		M7
	Zhuxinzhuang (Changping)	Yinghai (Daxing)	July 19, 2008	December 31, 2021	49.5	35 (3)	1 2 6 7 10 12 13 14 15 18 Changping	6-car Type B		M8
	Guojia Tushuguan (National Library) (Haidian)	Guogongzhuang (Fengtai)	December 31, 2011	December 30, 2012	16.5	13	1 4 6 7 10 14 16 Fangshan	6-car Type B		M9
loop line	Bagou (Haidian)	Chedaogou (Haidian)	July 19, 2008	May 5, 2013	57.1	45	1 3 4 5 6 7 8 9 12 13 14 15 16 17 19 Yizhuang Fangshan Changping Capital Airport Daxing Airport Xijiao	6-car Type B		M10
	Moshikou (Shijingshan)	Xinshougang (Shougang Park) (Shijingshan)	December 31, 2021	December 30, 2023	2.9	4	6 S1	4-car Type A		M11
	Sijiqing Qiao (Haidian)	Dongbabei (Chaoyang)	December 15, 2024	—	27.5	20	3 4 5 8 10 13 16 17 19 Changping Capital Airport	4-car Type A		M12
	Xizhimen (Xicheng)	Dongzhimen (Dongcheng)	September 28, 2002	January 28, 2003	40.9	17 (16)	2 4 5 8 10 12 15 Changping Capital Airport	6-car Type B		M13
	Zhangguozhuang (Fengtai)	Shangezhuang (Chaoyang)	May 5, 2013	December 31, 2021	47.3	33 (2) (Note: The following stations have not been opened and are not included in the station count: Taoran Qiao, Hongmiao and Gaojiayuan on Line 14 and Guangqumen Wai on Line 17.)	1 3 4 5 6 7 8 9 10 12 15 16 17 19 Daxing Airport	6-car Type A		M14
	Qinghua Donglu Xikou (Haidian)	Fengbo (Shunyi)	December 30, 2010	December 28, 2014	41.4	20 (4)	5 8 13 14 Changping	6-car Type B		M15
	Bei'anhe (Haidian)	Wanpingcheng (Fengtai)	December 31, 2016	December 30, 2023	49.8	30	1 4 6 7 9 10 12 14 18 Fangshan Daxing Airport	8-car Type A		M16
	Weilaikexuechengbei (Future Science City North) (Changping)	Jiahuihu (Tongzhou)	December 31, 2021	December 27, 2025	48.9	20	1 3 6 7 10 12 13 14 15 18 Changping Yizhuang	8-car Type A		M17/R2
	Malianwa (Haidian)	Tiantongyuandong (Changping)	December 27, 2025	—	19.8	11	5 8 16 17	6-car Type B		M18
	Mudanyuan (Haidian)	Xingong (Fengtai)	December 31, 2021	—	20.9	10	1 2 4 6 7 10 12 14 Daxing Airport	8-car Type A		M19/R3
	Songjiazhuang (Fengtai)	Yizhuang railway station (Tongzhou)	December 30, 2010	December 30, 2018	23.3	14 (8)	5 10 17 Yizhuang T1	6-car Type B		M24
	Dongguantounan (Fengtai)	Yancundong (Fangshan)	December 30, 2010	December 31, 2020	31.8	16 (10)	9 10 16 Yanfang	6-car Type B		M25 North
	Yancundong (Fangshan)	Yanshan (Fangshan)	December 30, 2017	—	14.4	9 (9)	Fangshan	4-car Type B		M25 South
Maglev	Pingguoyuan (Shijingshan)	Shichang (Mentougou)	December 30, 2017	December 31, 2021	10.2	8 (8)	6 11	6-car Maglev		M26
	Changping Xishankou (Changping)	Jimen Qiao (Haidian)	December 30, 2010	December 15, 2024	44.2	20 (6)	8 10 12 13 15	6-car Type B		M27
Express	Beixinqiao (Dongcheng)	2 Hao Hangzhanlou (Terminal 2) (Chaoyang); 3 Hao Hangzhanlou (Terminal 3) (Shunyi)	July 19, 2008	December 31, 2021	29.9	5 (1)	2 5 10 12 13	4-car Linear Motor		M34
Express	Caoqiao (Fengtai)	Daxing Jichang (Daxing Airport) (Guangyang, Langfang)	September 26, 2019	—	41.36	3	10 14 16 19	8-car Type D		M35
LRT	Bagou (Haidian)	Fragrant Hills (Haidian)	December 30, 2017	—	8.8	6 (6)	10	5-car Tram		M29
LRT	Quzhuang (Daxing)	Dinghaiyuan (Tongzhou)	December 31, 2020	—	11.9	14 (14)	Yizhuang	5-car Tram		—
Total					909	541 (109)				

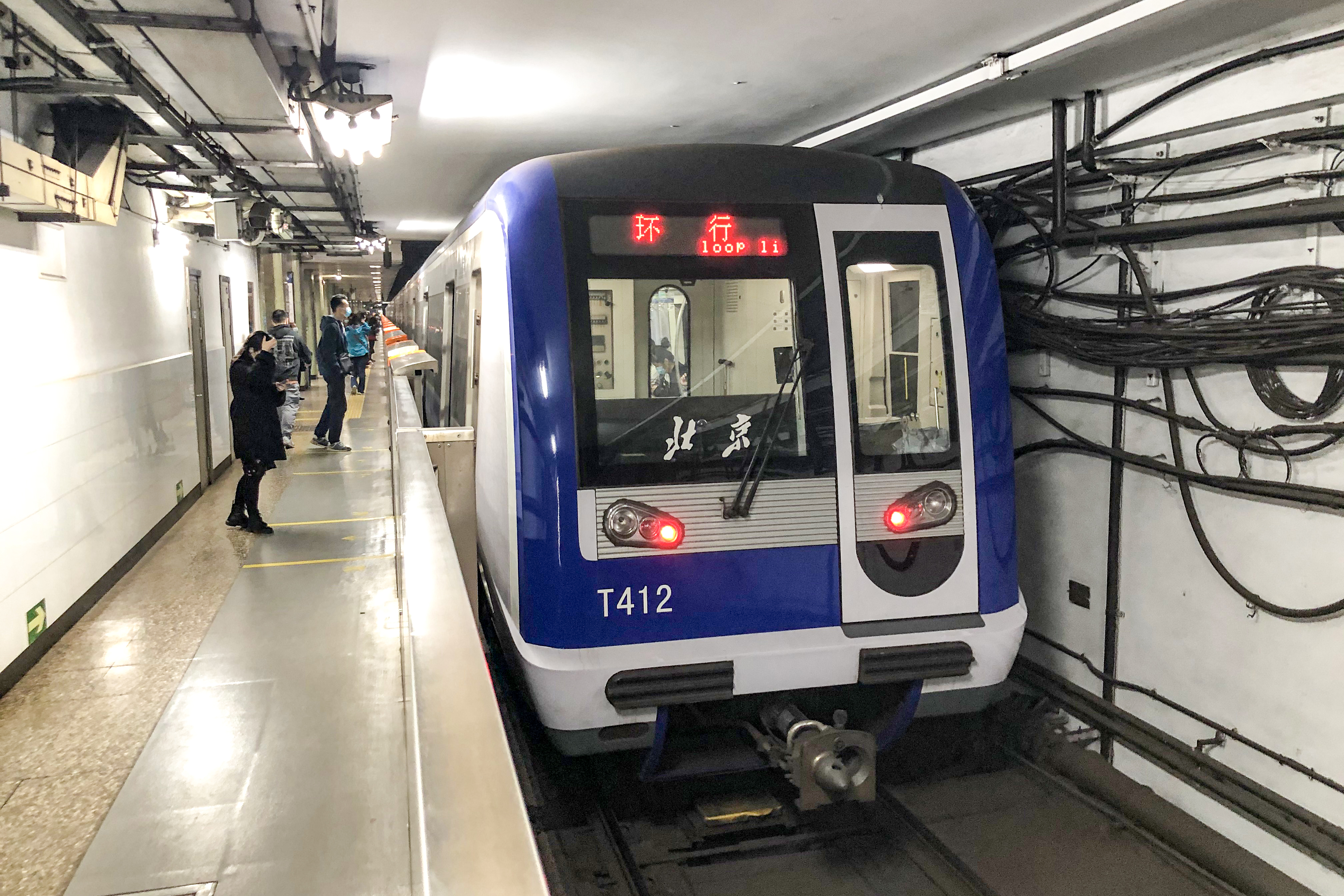
A Line 2 train

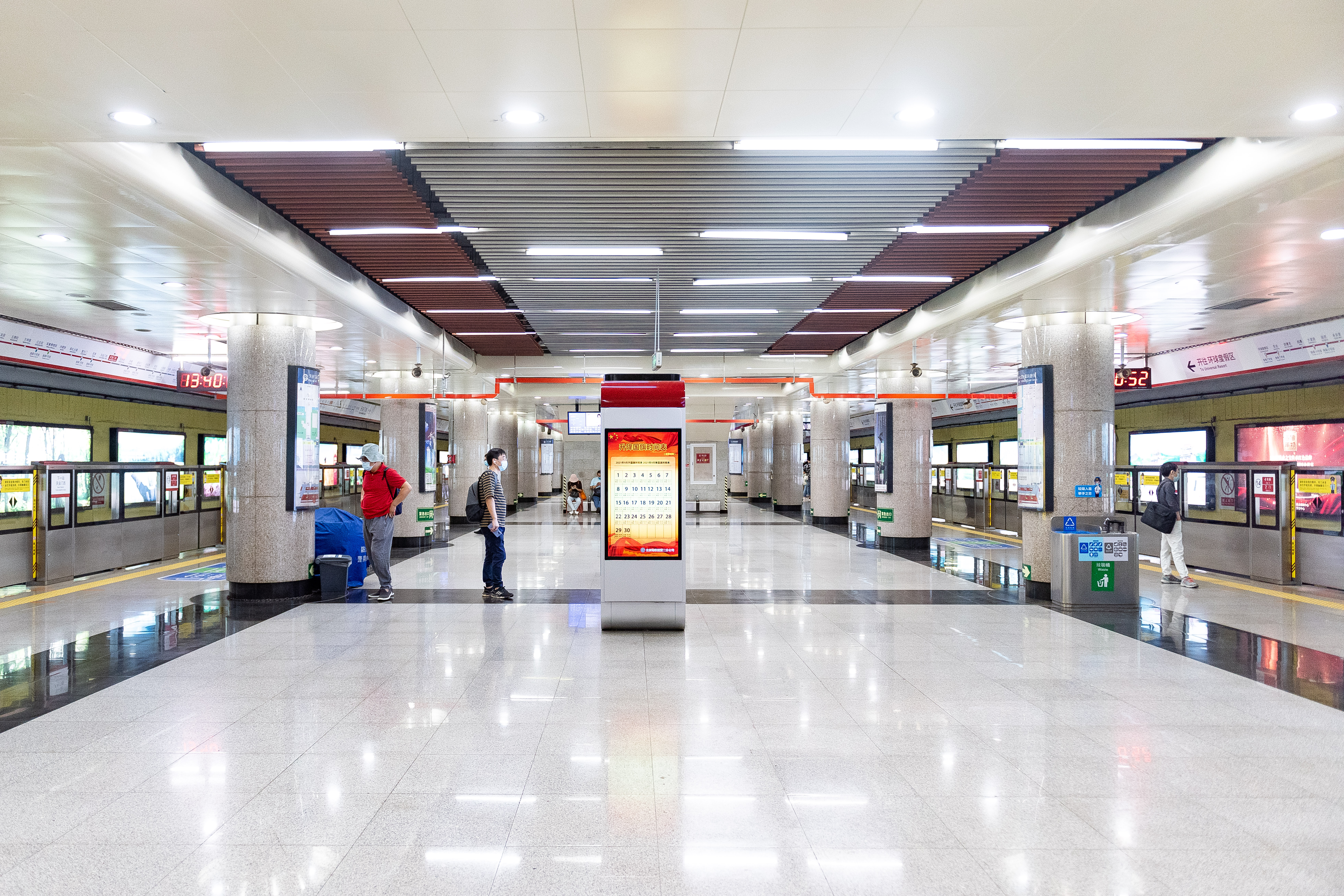
Line 1 platform at Tian'anmen East Station

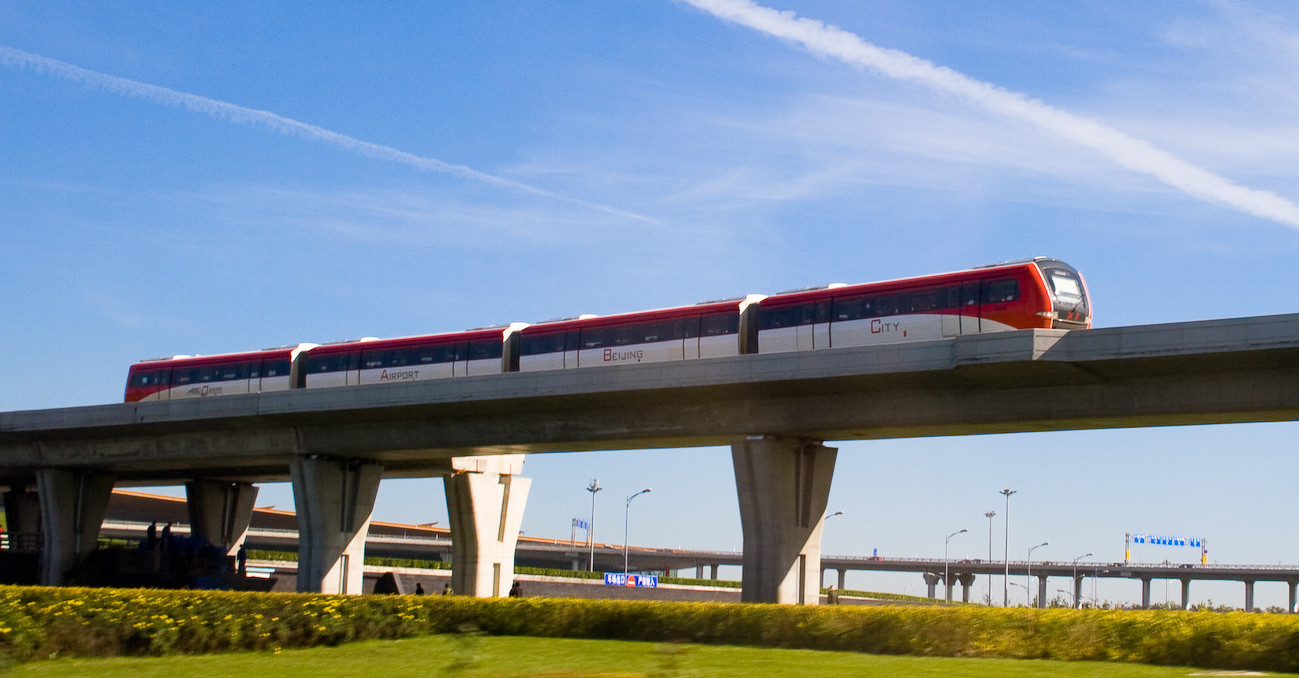
Capital Airport Express

=== Lines through the urban core ===
The urban core of Beijing is roughly outlined by the Line 10 loop, which runs underneath or just beyond the 3rd Ring Road. Each of the following lines provides extensive service within the Line 10 loop. All have connections to seven or more lines. Lines 1, 4, 5, 6, 8, and 19 also run through the Line 2 loop, marking the old Ming-Qing era city of Beijing.

- Line 1: straight east–west line underneath Chang'an Avenue, bisecting the city through Tiananmen Square. Line 1 connects major commercial centres, Xidan, Wangfujing, Dongdan and the Beijing CBD.
- Line 2: the inner rectangular loop line that traces the Ming-era inner city wall which once surrounded the inner city, with stops at 11 of the wall's former gates (ending in men), now busy intersections on the 2nd Ring Road, as well as the Beijing railway station. (Note: There is no subway stop at the 12th gate, Deshengmen, between Jishuitan and Gulou Dajie.)
- Line 3 runs from the eastern edge of the inner city to the northeast, through Sanlitun, Chaoyang Park and Chaoyang railway station.
- Line 4: mainly north–south line running to the west of city centre with stops at the Summer Palace, Old Summer Palace, Peking and Renmin Universities, Zhongguancun, National Library, Beijing Zoo, Xidan, Taoranting and Beijing South railway station.
- Line 5: straight north–south line running to the east of the city centre. Line 5 passes the Temple of Earth, Yonghe Temple and the Temple of Heaven.
- Line 6: east–west line running parallel and to the north of Line 1, passing through the city centre north of Beihai Park. At 53.4 km, Line 6 is the second longest Beijing Subway line after Line 10, and runs from Shijingshan District in the west to the Beijing City Sub-Center in Tongzhou District, terminating at Lucheng just beyond the eastern 6th Ring Road.
- Line 7: east–west line running parallel and to the south of Line 1, from Beijing West railway station to Universal Resort. Line 7 serves the old neighborhoods of southern Beijing with stops at Zhushikou, Caishikou and Ciqikou.
- Line 8: north–south line following the Beijing's central axis from Changping District through Huilongguan, the Olympic Green, Shichahai and Nanluoguxiang, where the line veers east of the Forbidden City and Tiananmen Square with stops at the National Art Museum and Wangfujing before returning to the central axis at Qianmen and continuing due south through Zhushikou and Yongdingmen to Heyi before turning southeast to Yinghai in Daxing District.
- Line 9: north–south line running to the west of Line 4 from the National Library through the Military Museum and Beijing West railway station to Guogongzhuang in the southwestern suburbs.
- Line 10, the outer loop line running beneath or just beyond the Third Ring Road. Apart from the Line 2 loop, which is entirely enclosed within the Line 10 loop, every other line through the urban core intersects with Line 10. In the north, Line 10 traces Beijing's Yuan-era city wall. In the east, Line 10 passes through the Beijing CBD.
- Line 11 is a very short line in the far western areas of Jin’anqiao and Xinshougang. It only has 3 stations.
- Line 12 follows the northern section of the 3rd Ring Road and then further east into Chaoyang.
- Line 13 arcs across suburbs north of the city and transports commuters to Xizhimen and Dongzhimen, at the northwest and northeast corners of Line 2.
- Line 14: inverted-L shaped line that connects the southwest, southeast and northeast parts of the city. From Zhangguozhuang in the southwest, Line 14 runs due west and enters the Line 10 loop at Xiju and passing through the Beijing South Railway Station, Yongdingmenwai, Puhuangyu, Fangzhuang and leaves the Line 10 loop at Shilihe before turning north at Beijing University of Technology and running south - north outside the Line 10 loop through the Beijing CBD, Chaoyang Park and Jiuxianqiao to Wangjing in the northeast.
- Line 16: line from the northwest suburbs of Haidian District north of the Baiwang Mountain that runs mostly north - south upon entering Line 10 into National Library and Yuyuantan Dongmen (Yuyuantan Park East Gate), then continuing south through Muxidi and Daguanying, before entering Lize Shangwuqu and Fengtai railway station. It then turns west through Fengtai Nanlu before ending at Wanpingcheng in Fengtai District.
- Line 17: north–south express line that runs from Weilaikexuechengbei (Future Science City North) to Jiahuihu, serving Changping District, Chaoyang District, Dongcheng District and Tongzhou District. The line connects the Future Science Park in Changping with the Beijing Economic-Technological Development Area in Yizhuang New Town.
- Line 19: north–south express line from Mudanyuan to Xingong with stops inside the Line 2 loop at Ping'anli and Taipingqiao near Beijing Financial Street.

=== Lines serving outlying suburbs ===
Each of the following lines provides service predominantly to one or more of the suburbs beyond the 5th Ring Road. Lines 15, S1 along with the Changping, Daxing, Yanfang lines extend beyond the 6th Ring Road.

- Line 11 currently runs from Moshikou to Xinshougang (Shougang Park) in Shijingshan District.
- Line 15: east–west line which runs between the northern 4th and 5th Ring Road from the east of Tsinghua University, through the Olympic Green and Wangjing, turning northeast to suburban Shunyi District.
- Line 18: east–west line created from the Line 13 split project, initially temporarily runs on the new underground section of the project, connecting the Malianwa-Shangdi area in Haidian District and the Huilongguan and Tiantongyuan areas in Changping District, forming a connection line in the northern suburbs of Beijing.
- Batong line extends Line 1 eastward from Sihui to suburban Tongzhou District.
- Changping line starts at Jimenqiao in Haidian District, passing through Liudaokou and Qinghe Xiaoyingqiao before intersecting with Line 13 at Qinghe railway station and Xi'erqi, and then running north through suburban Changping District. The line then passes the Life Science Park, Shahe Univ. Park, and the Ming Tombs.
- Daxing line extends Line 4 south to suburban Daxing District.
- Fangshan line goes from Dongguantounan in Fengtai District to Yancundong in Fangshan District in the southwestern suburbs.
- Yanfang line extends from the end of the Fangshan line further into western Fangshan District.
- Yizhuang line extends from Line 5's southern terminus to the Yizhuang Economic & Technological Development Zone in the southeastern suburbs.
- Capital Airport Express connects the Beijing Capital International Airport, 27 km (17 mi) northeast of the city, with Line 5 at Beixinqiao, Lines 10 and 12 at Sanyuanqiao and Lines 2 and 13 at Dongzhimen.
- Daxing Airport Express connects the Beijing Daxing International Airport, 46 km (29 mi) south of the city, with Lines 10 and 19 at Caoqiao.
- Line S1, a low-speed maglev line connecting suburban Mentougou District with Line 6 in Shijingshan District.
- Xijiao line, a light rail line that branches off Line 10 at Bagou and extends west to Fragrant Hills.
- Yizhuang T1 line, a light rail line runs from Quzhuang in Daxing District to Dinghaiyuan in Tongzhou District.
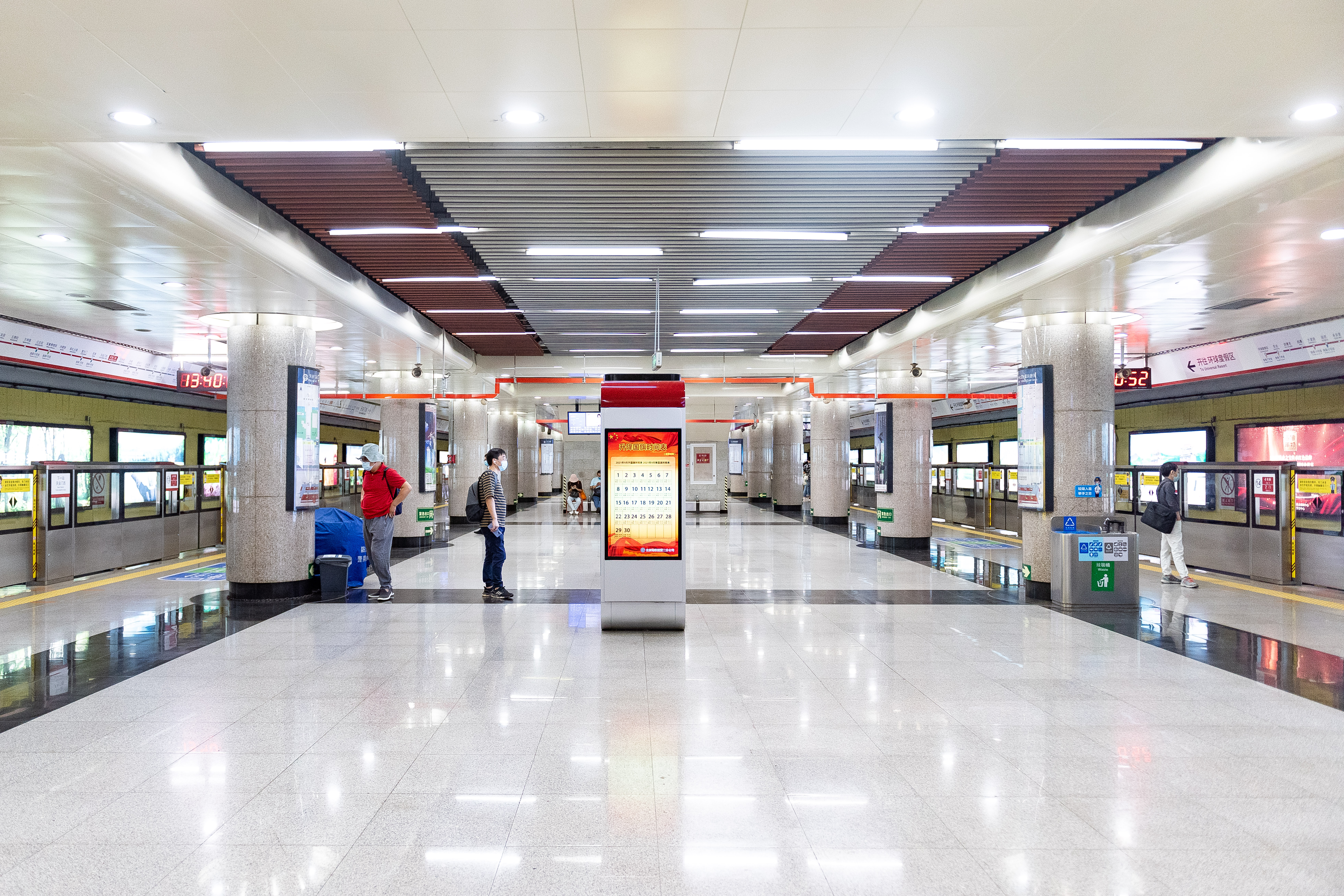
Tian'anmen East station of Line 1

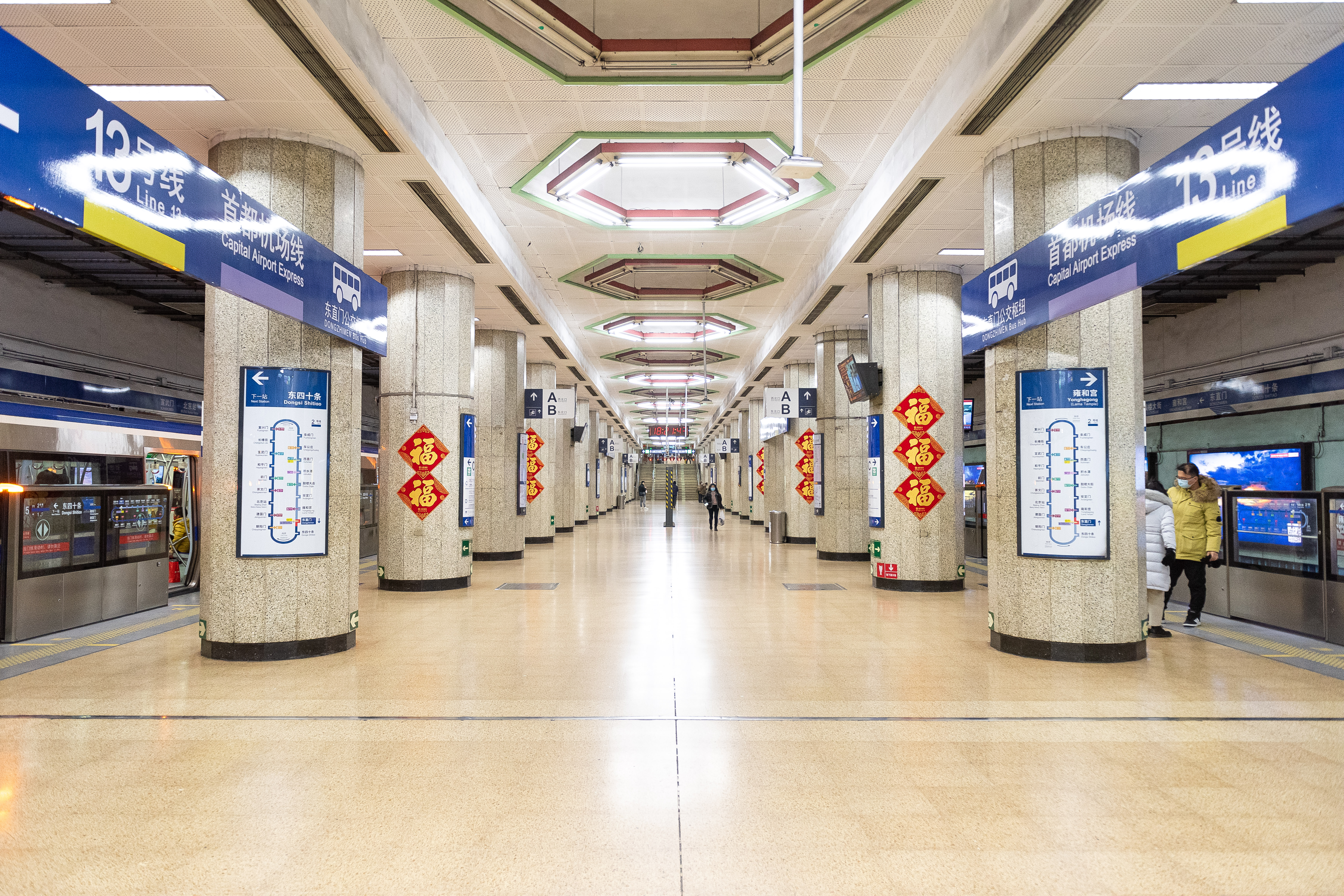
Dongzhimen station of Line 2

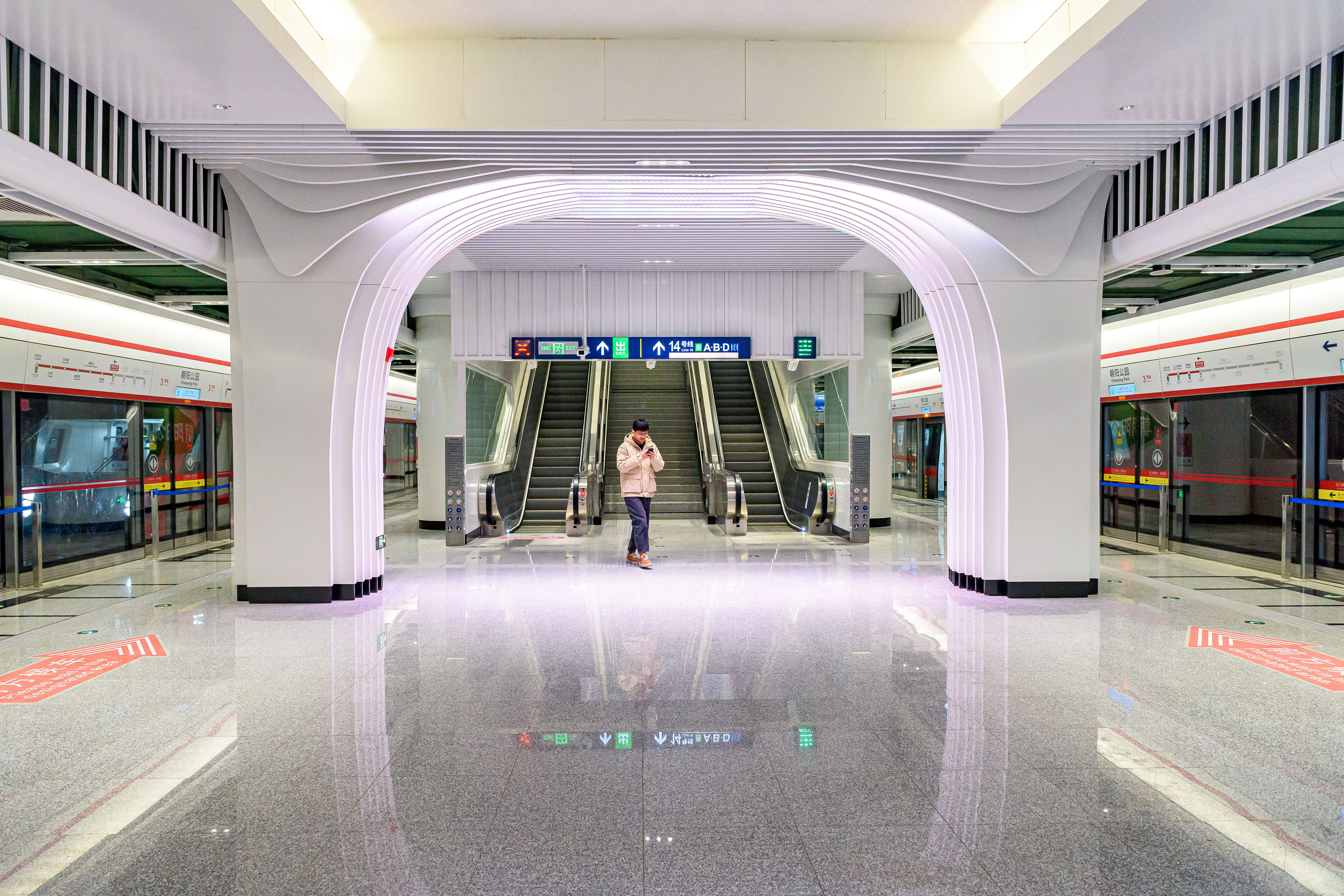
Chaoyang Park station of Line 3

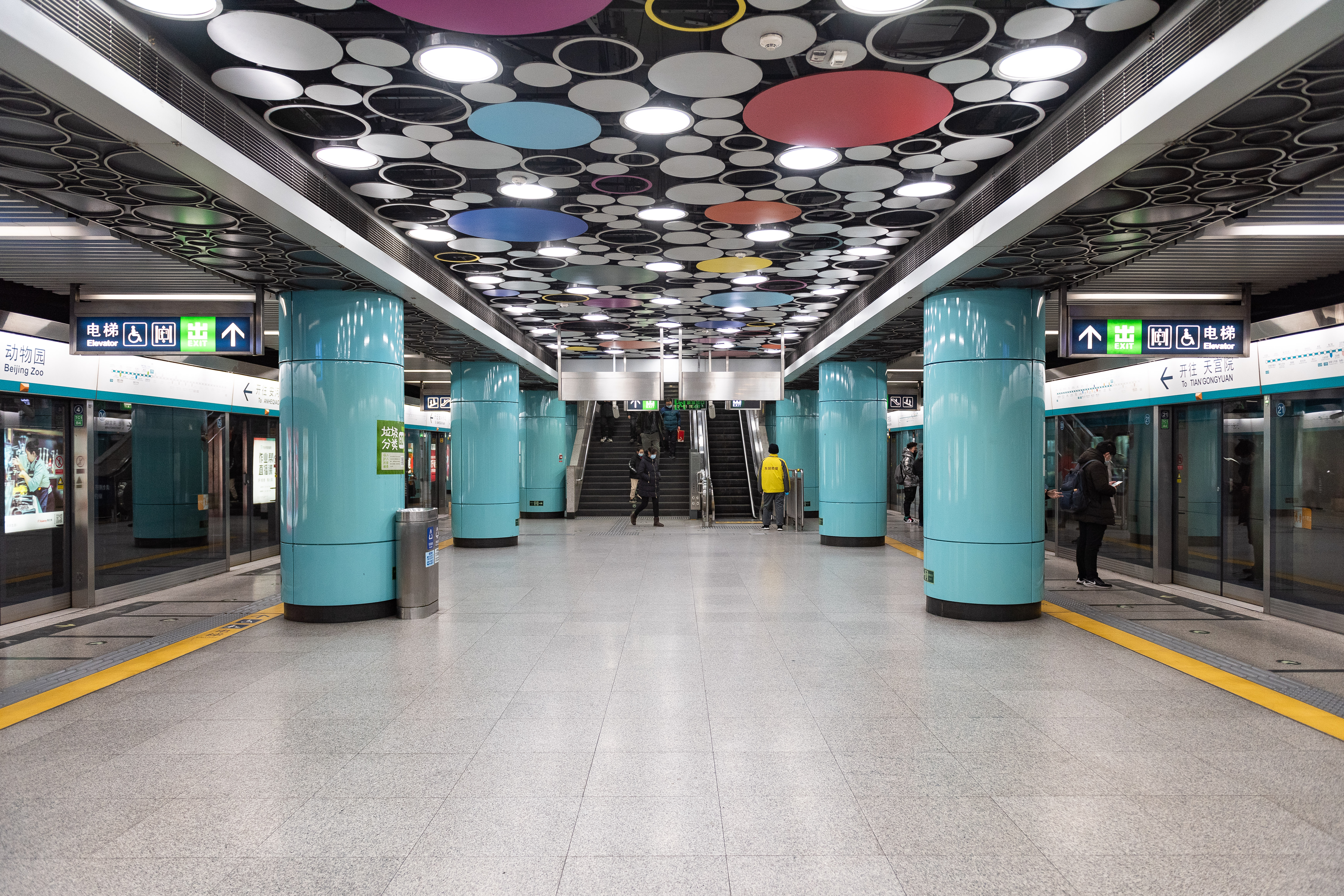
Beijing Zoo station of Line 4

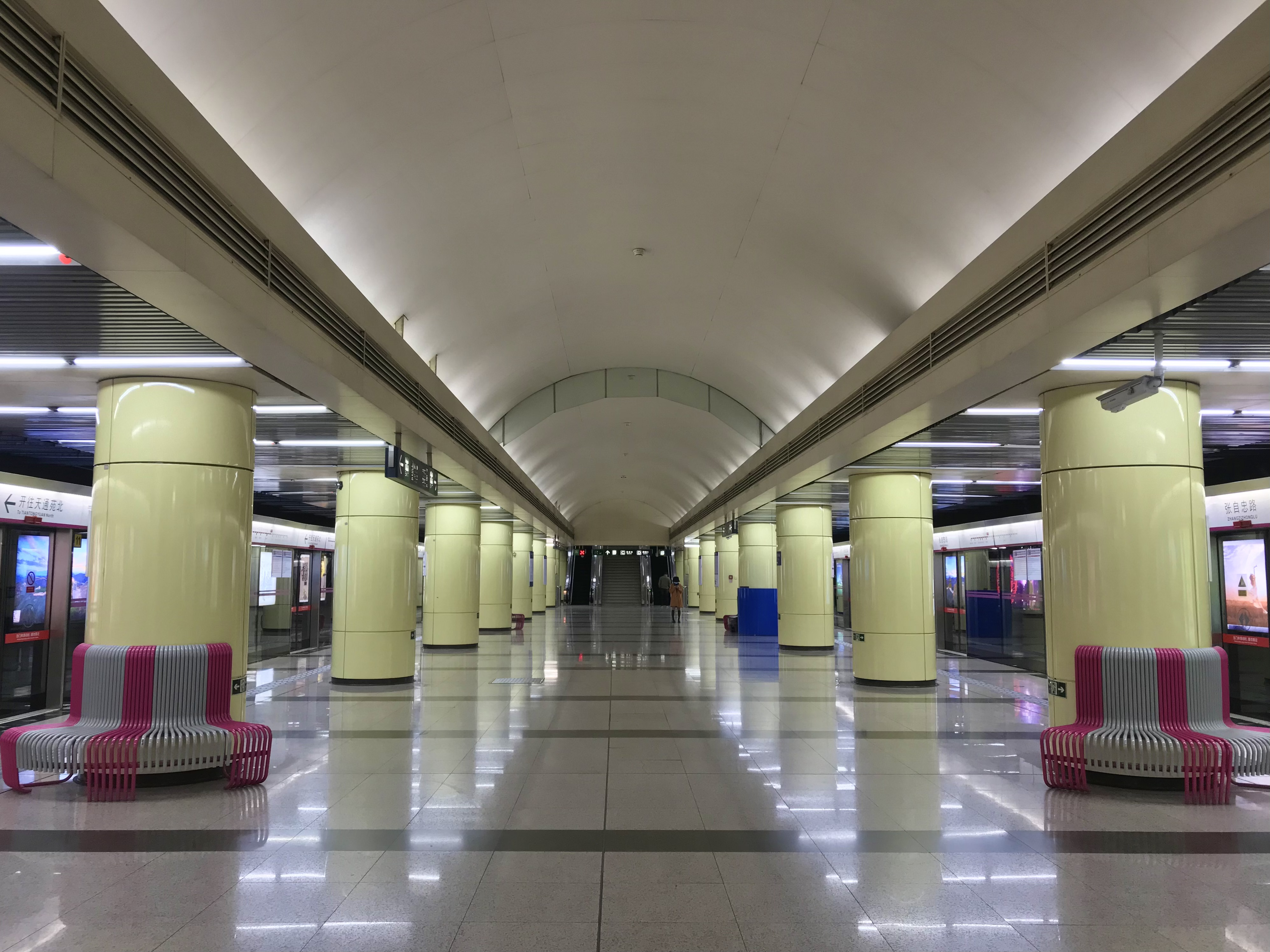
Zhangzizhonglu station of Line 5

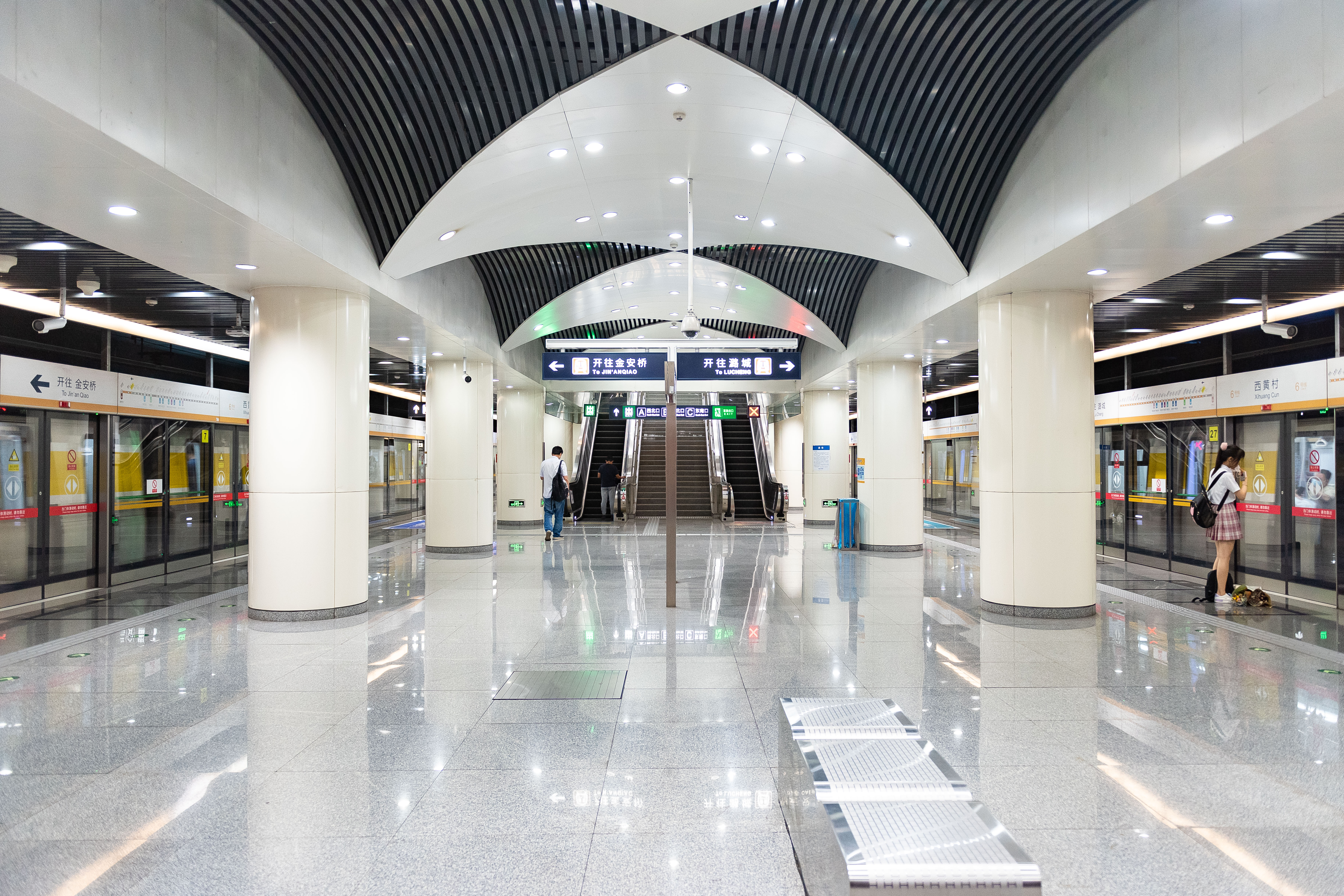
Xihuangcun station of Line 6

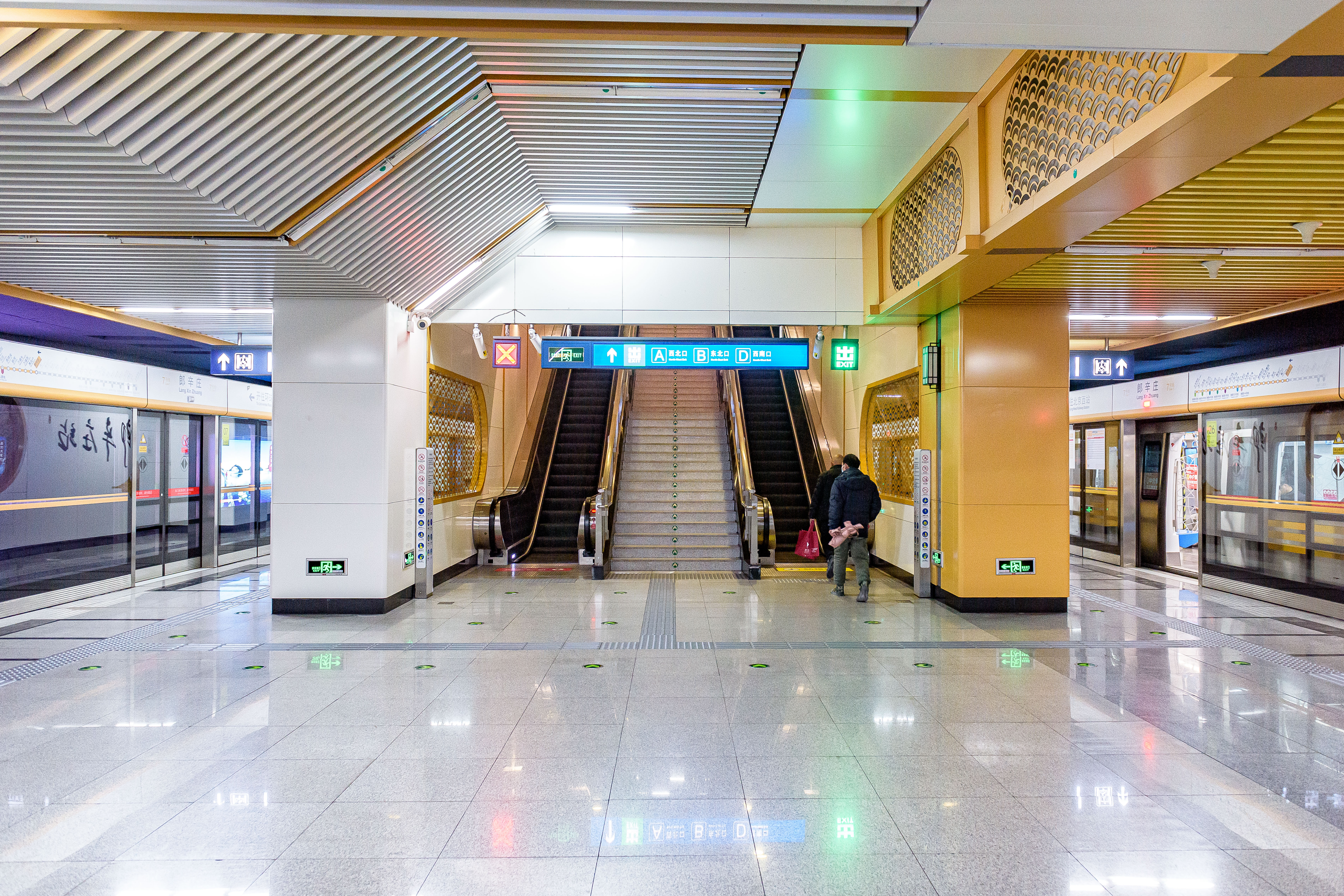
Langxinzhuang station of Line 7

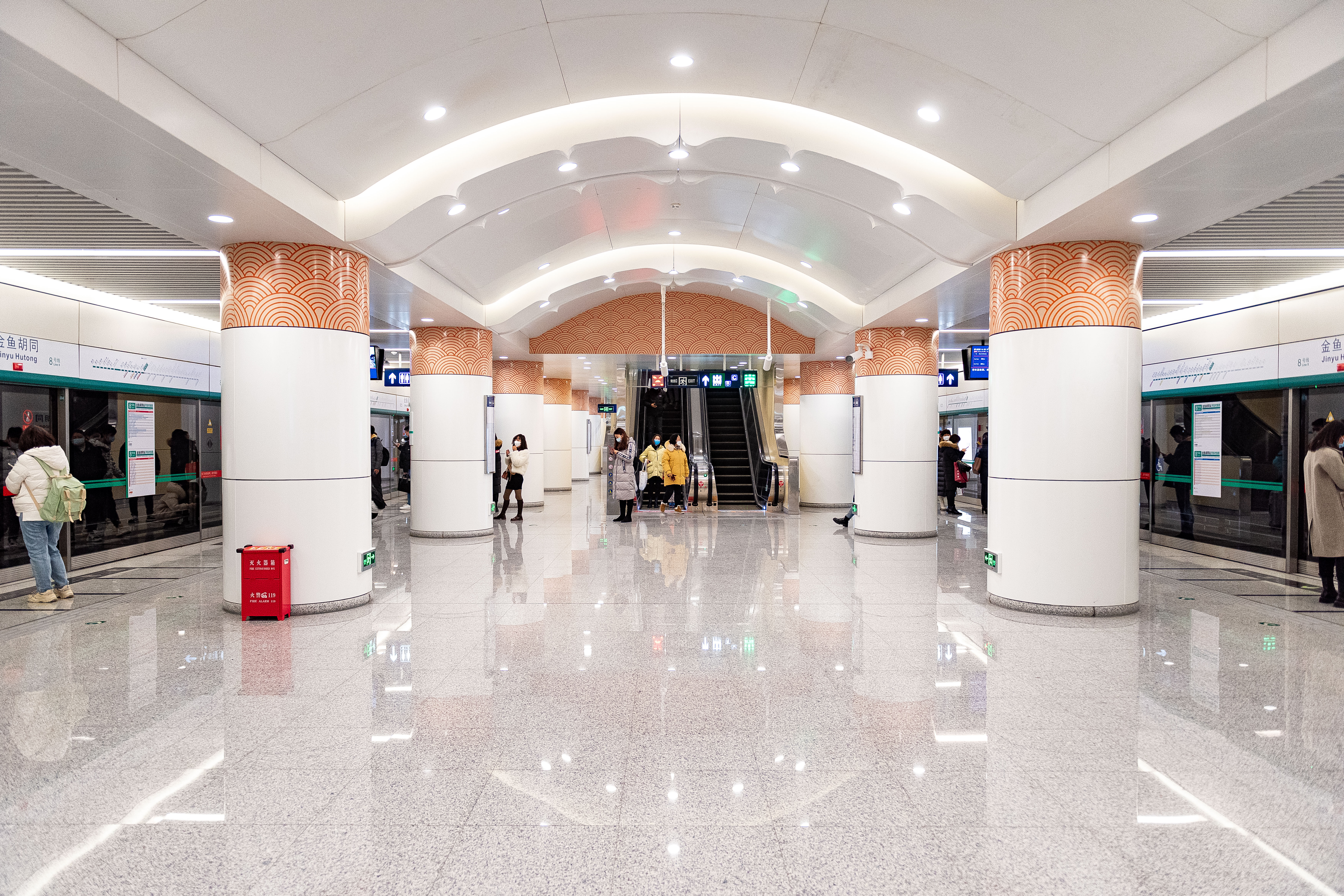
Jinyu Hutong station of Line 8

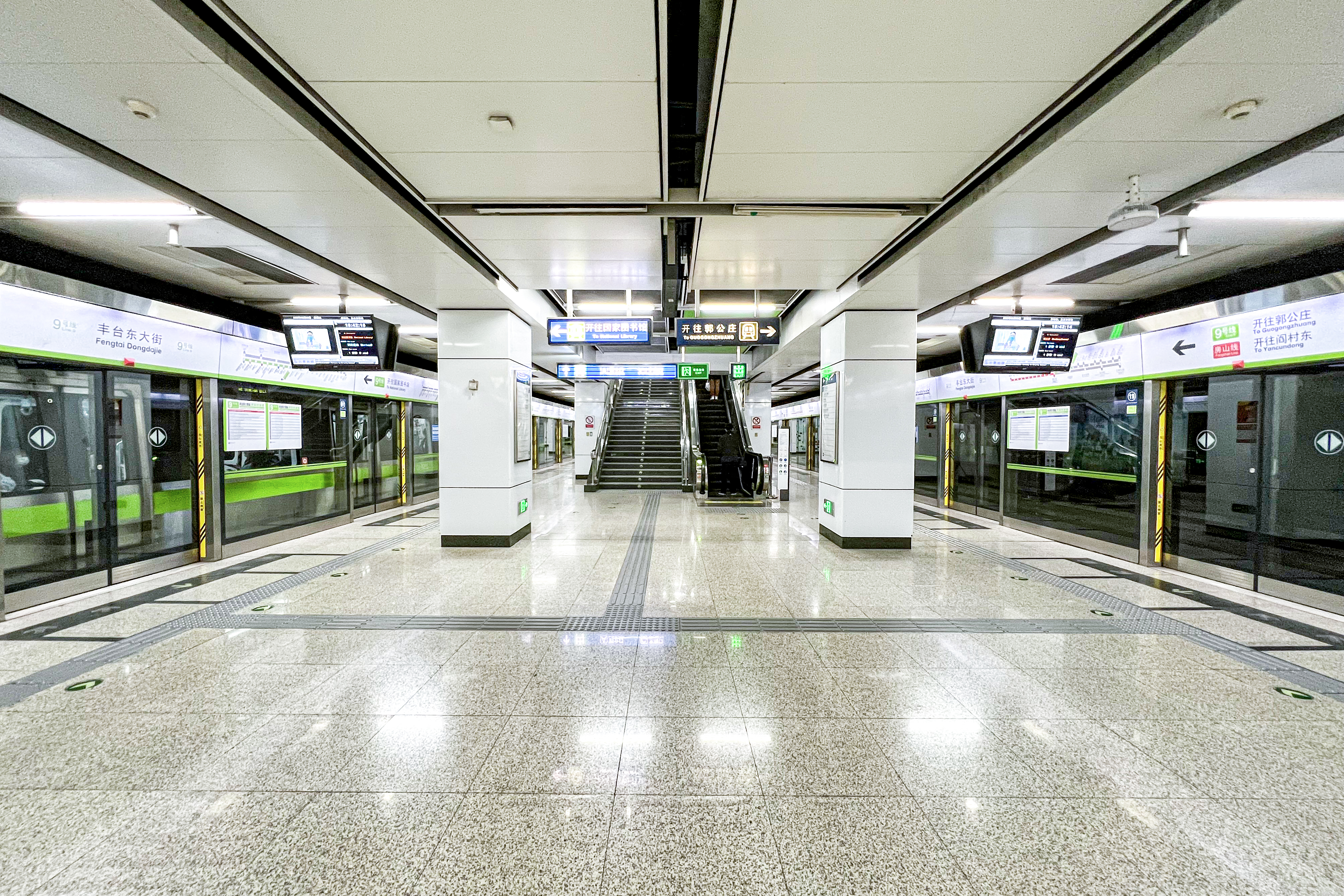
Fengtai Dongdajie station of Line 9

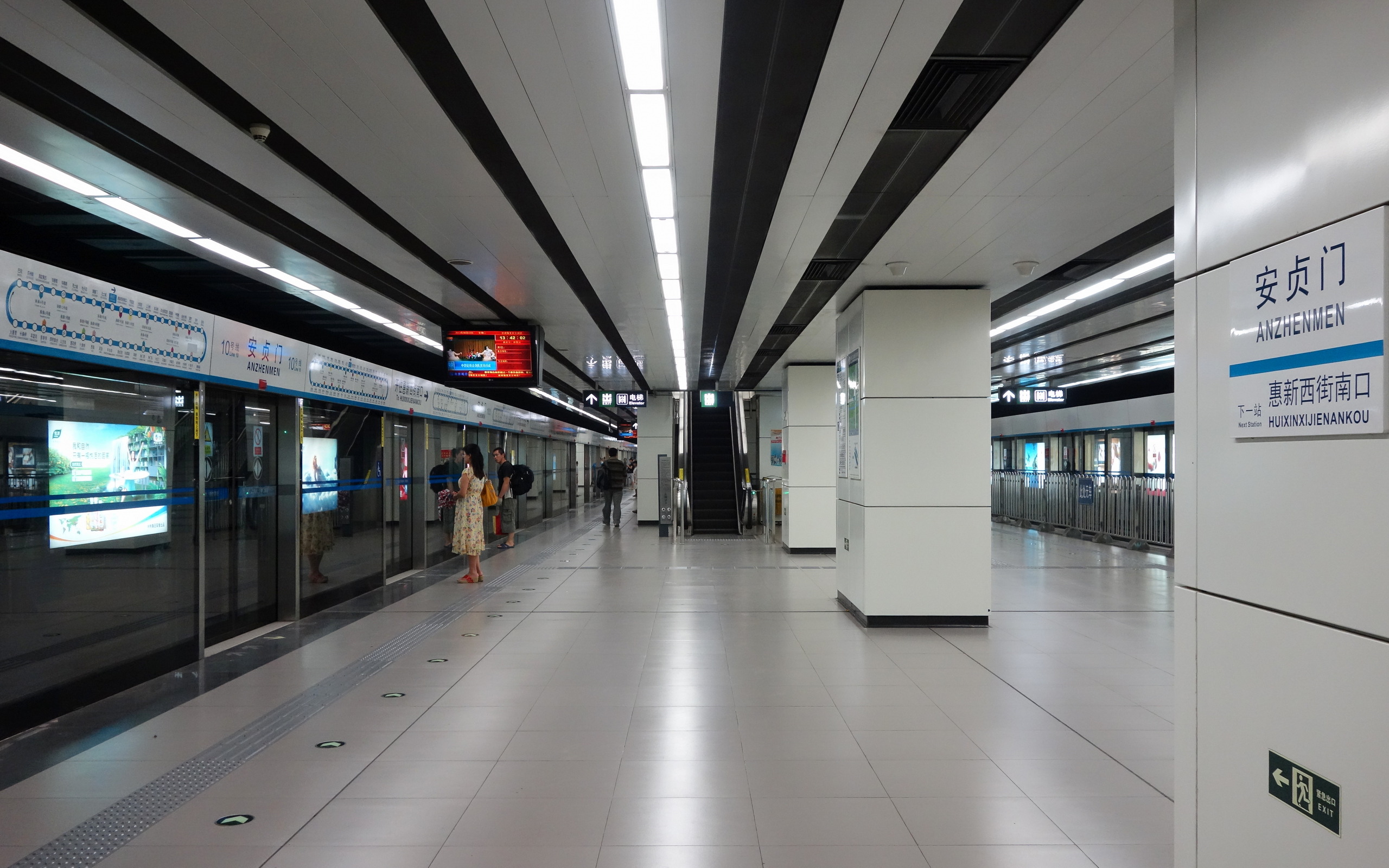
Anzhenmen station of Line 10

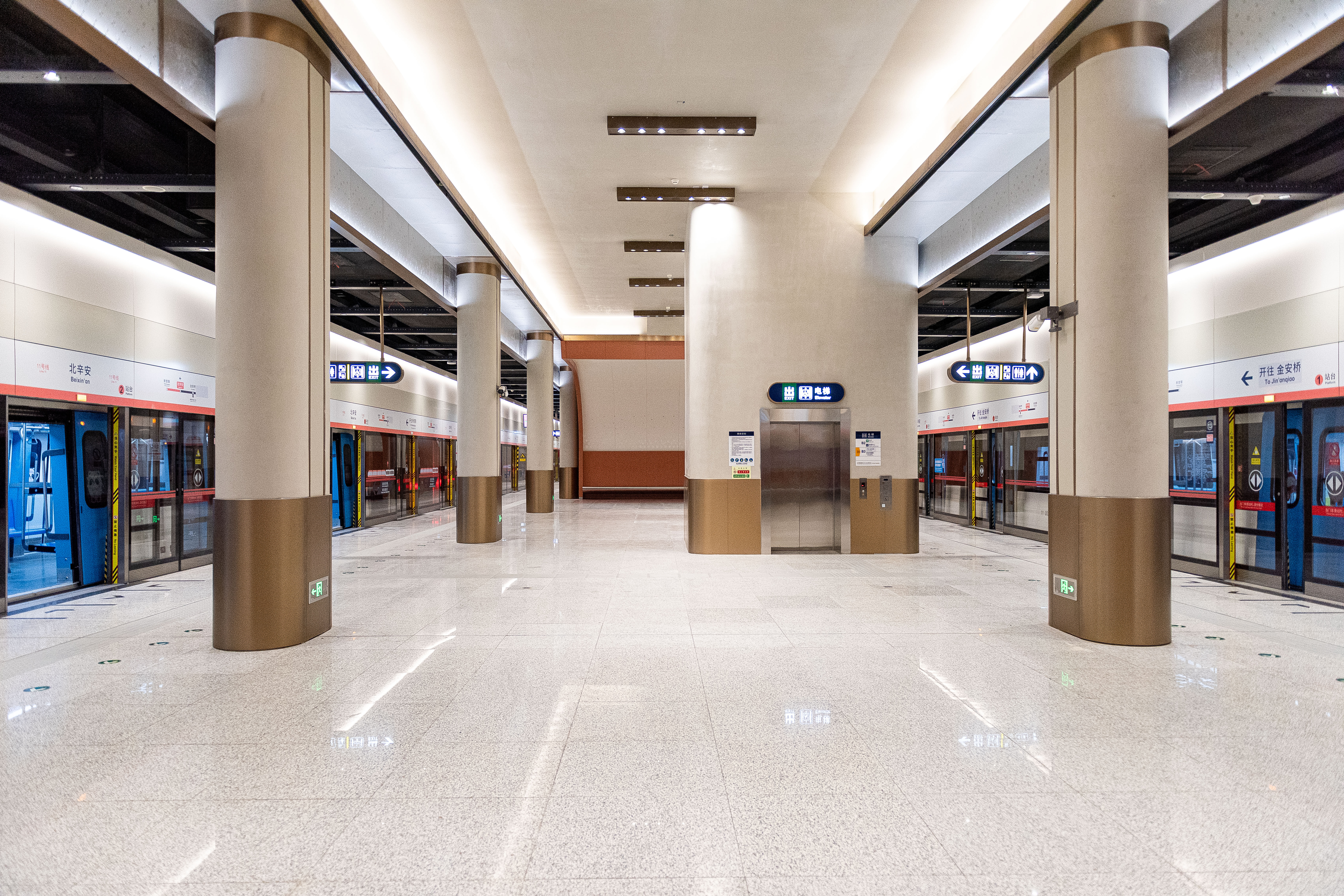
Beixin'an station of Line 11

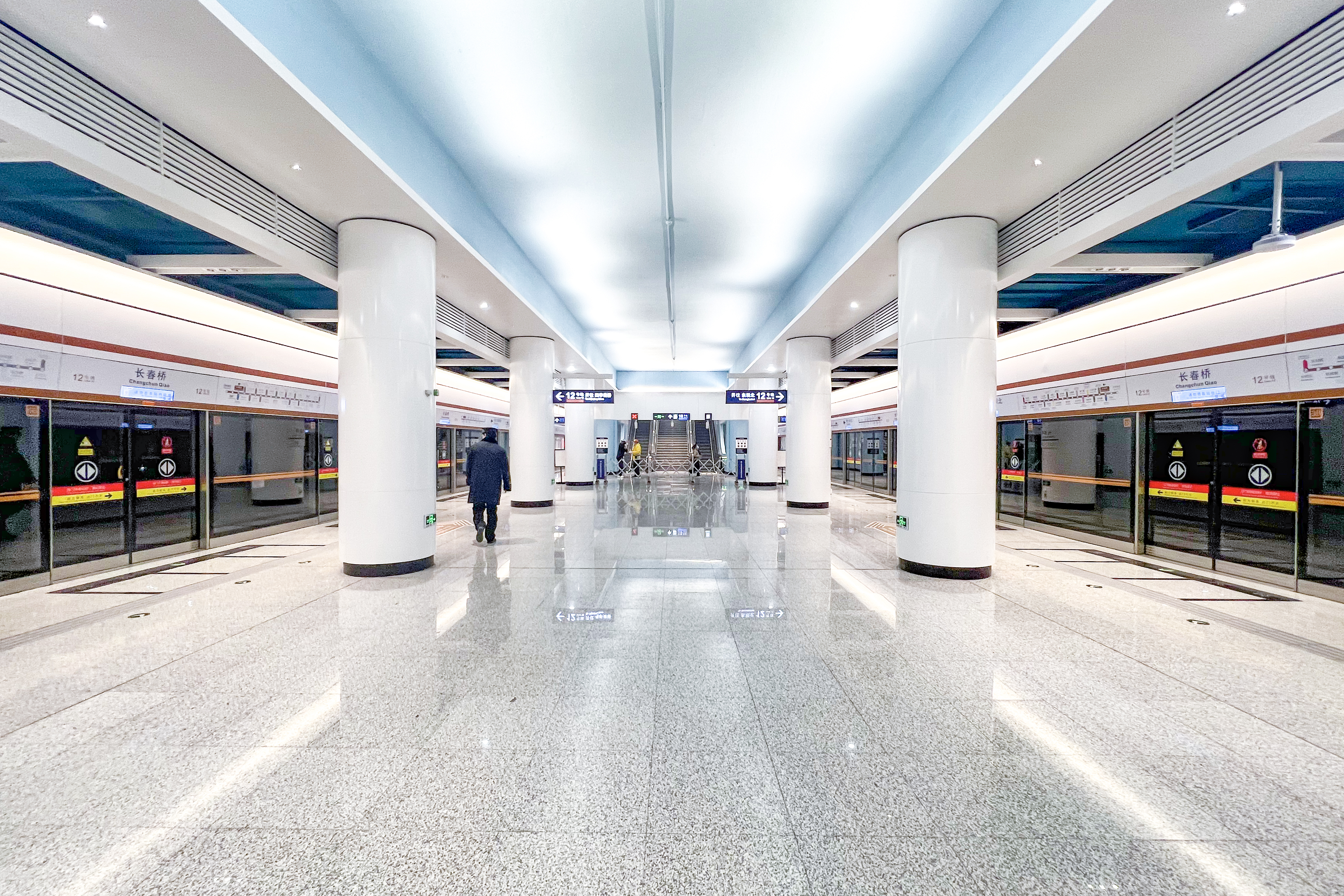
Changchun Qiao station of Line 12

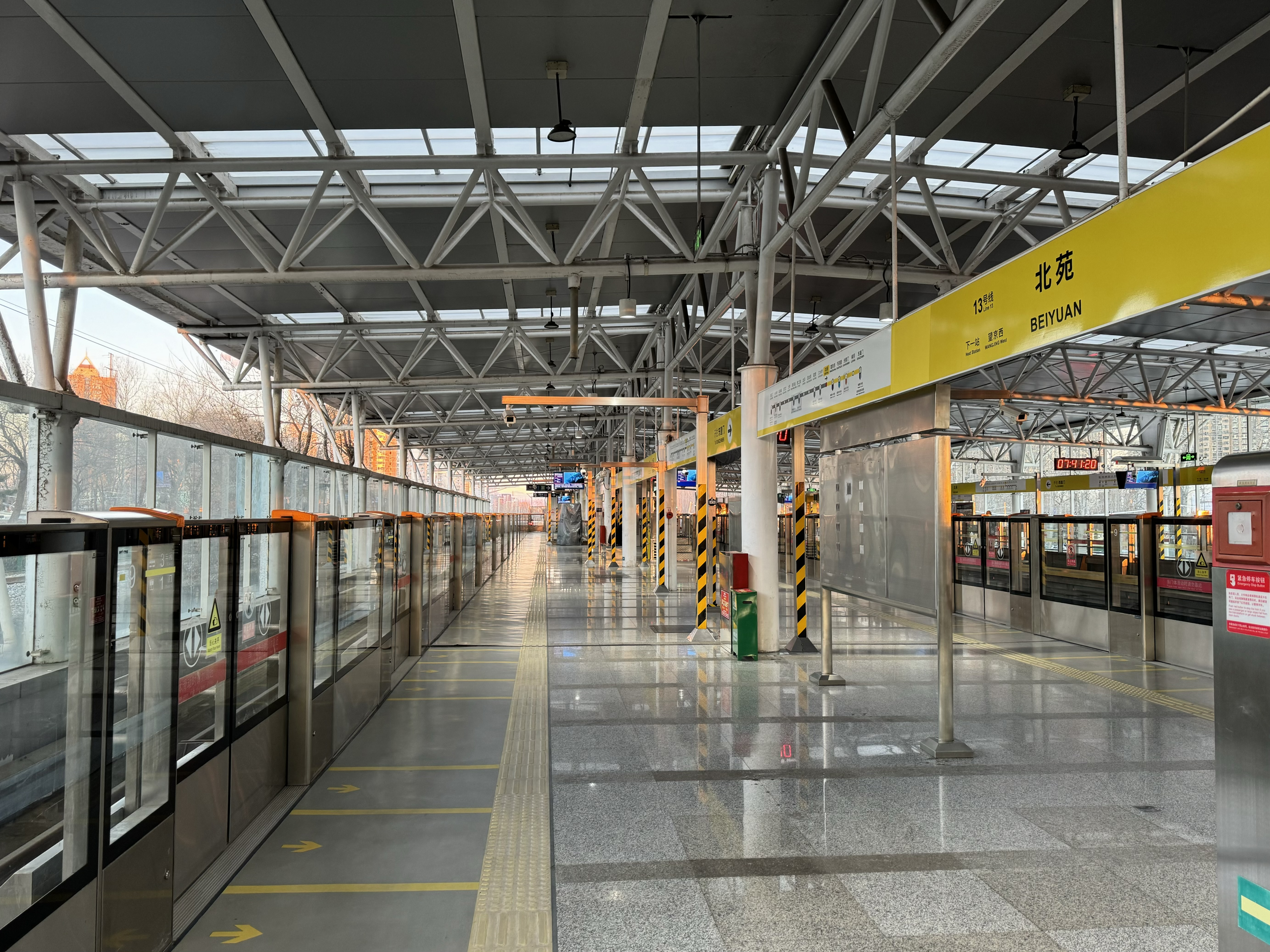
Bei Yuan station of Line 13

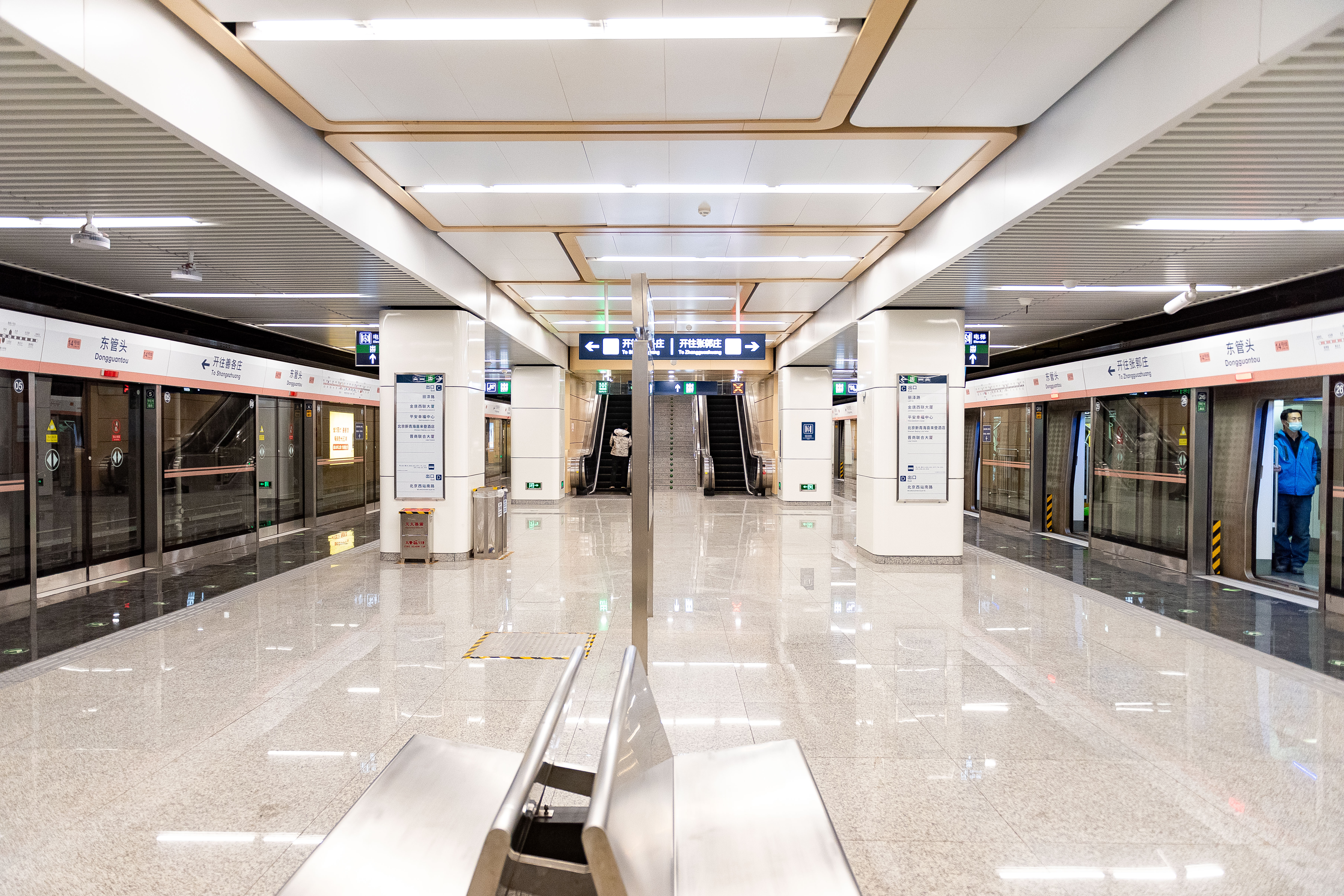
Dongguantou station of Line 14

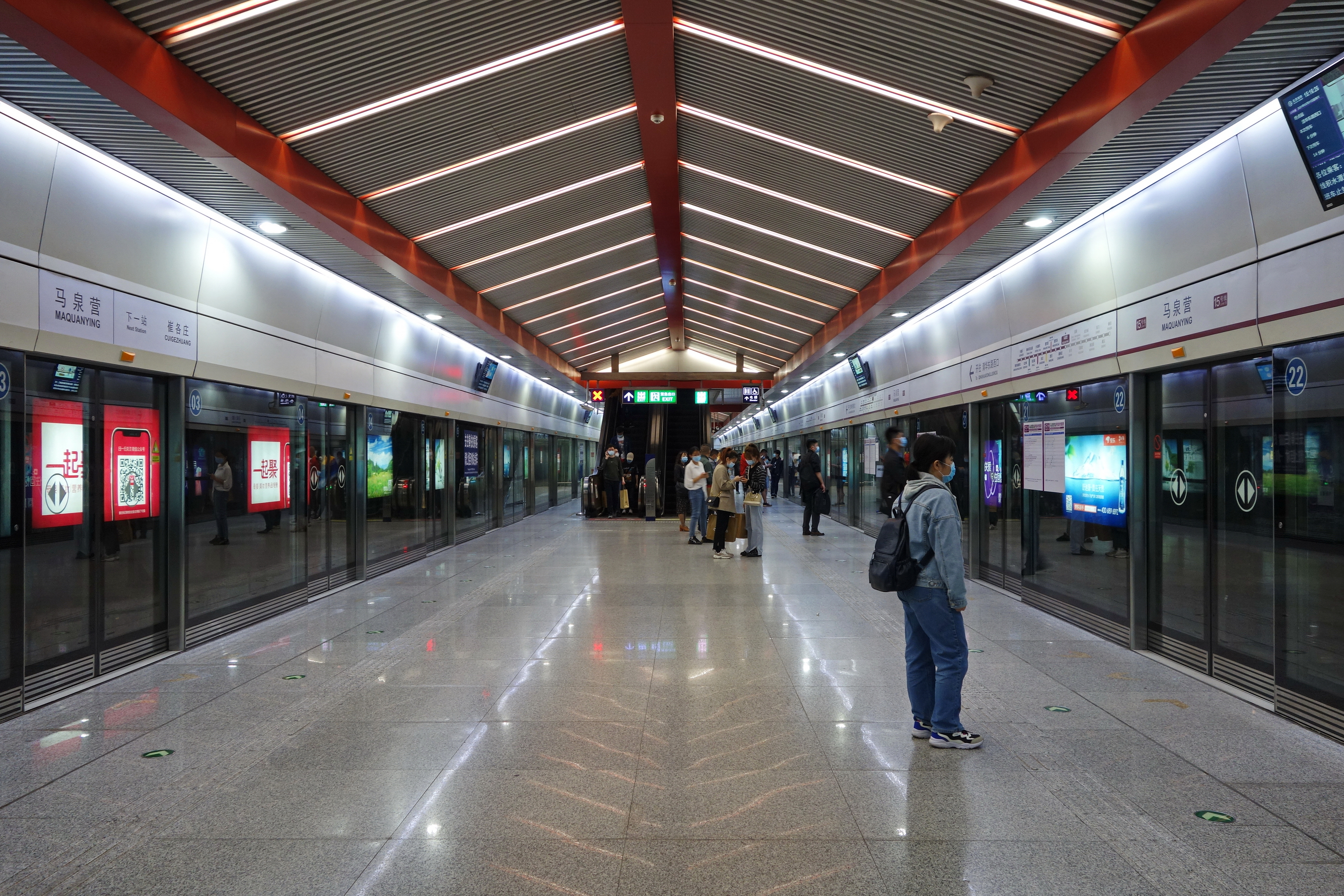
Maquanying station of Line 15

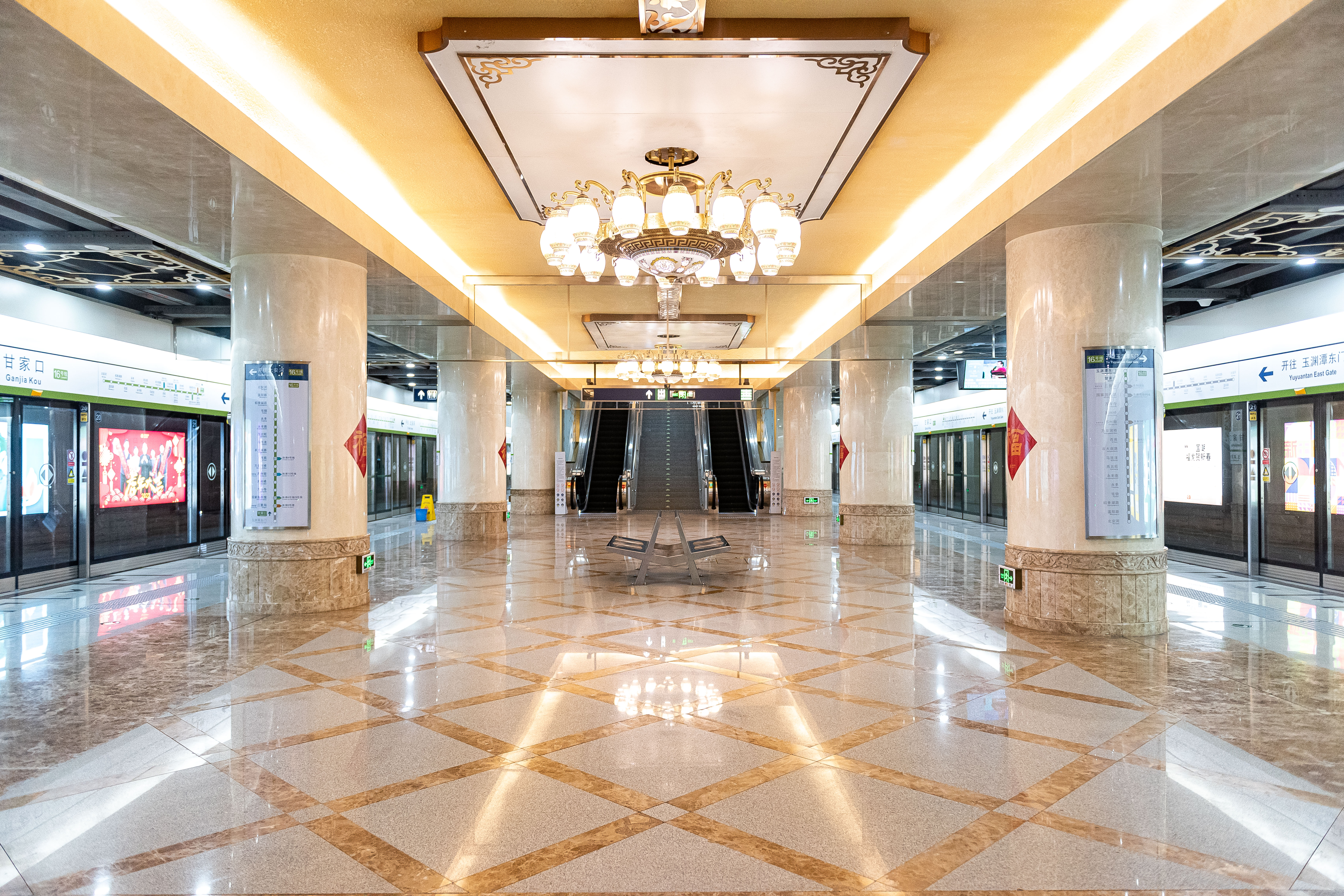
Ganjiakou station of Line 16

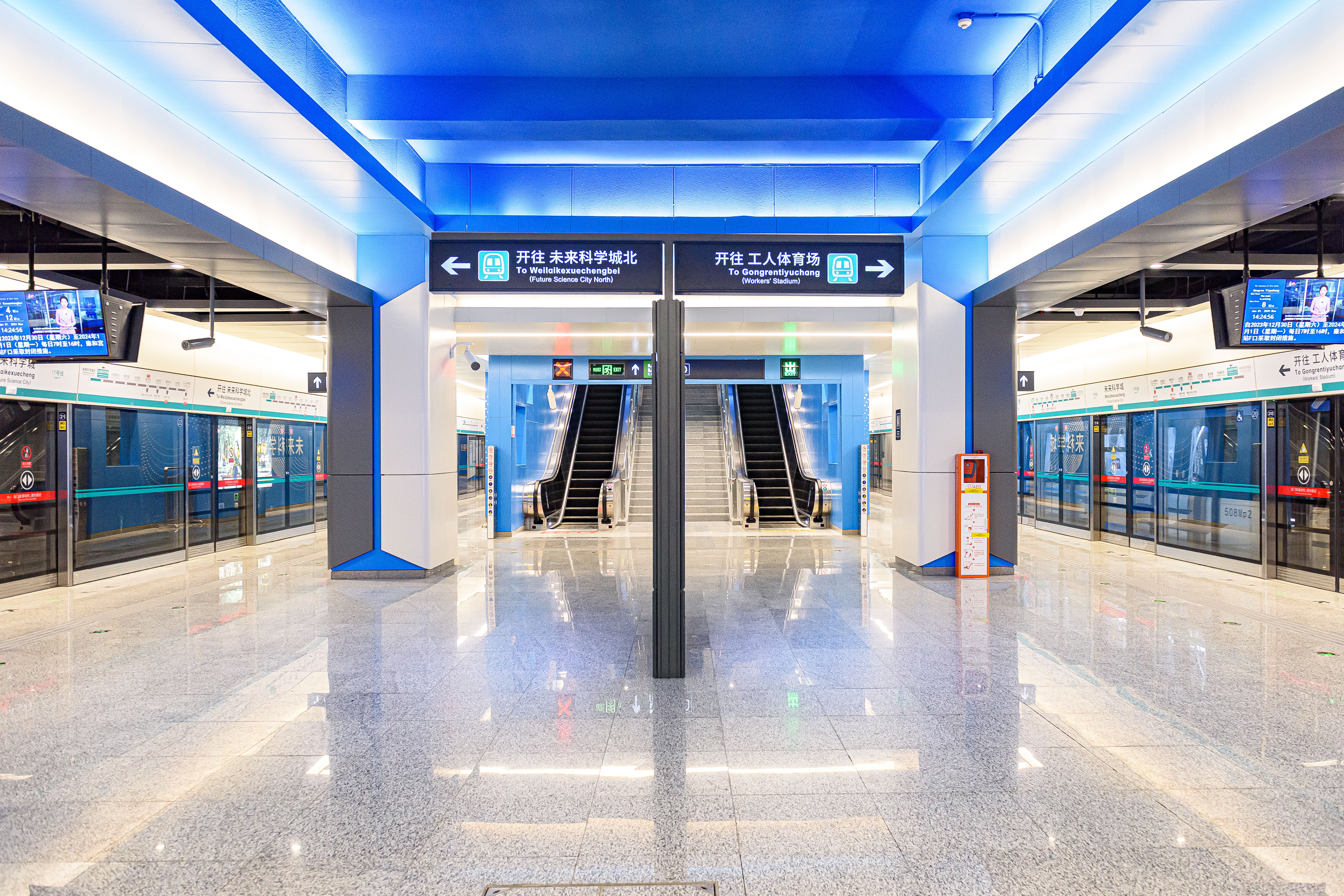
Future Science City station of Line 17

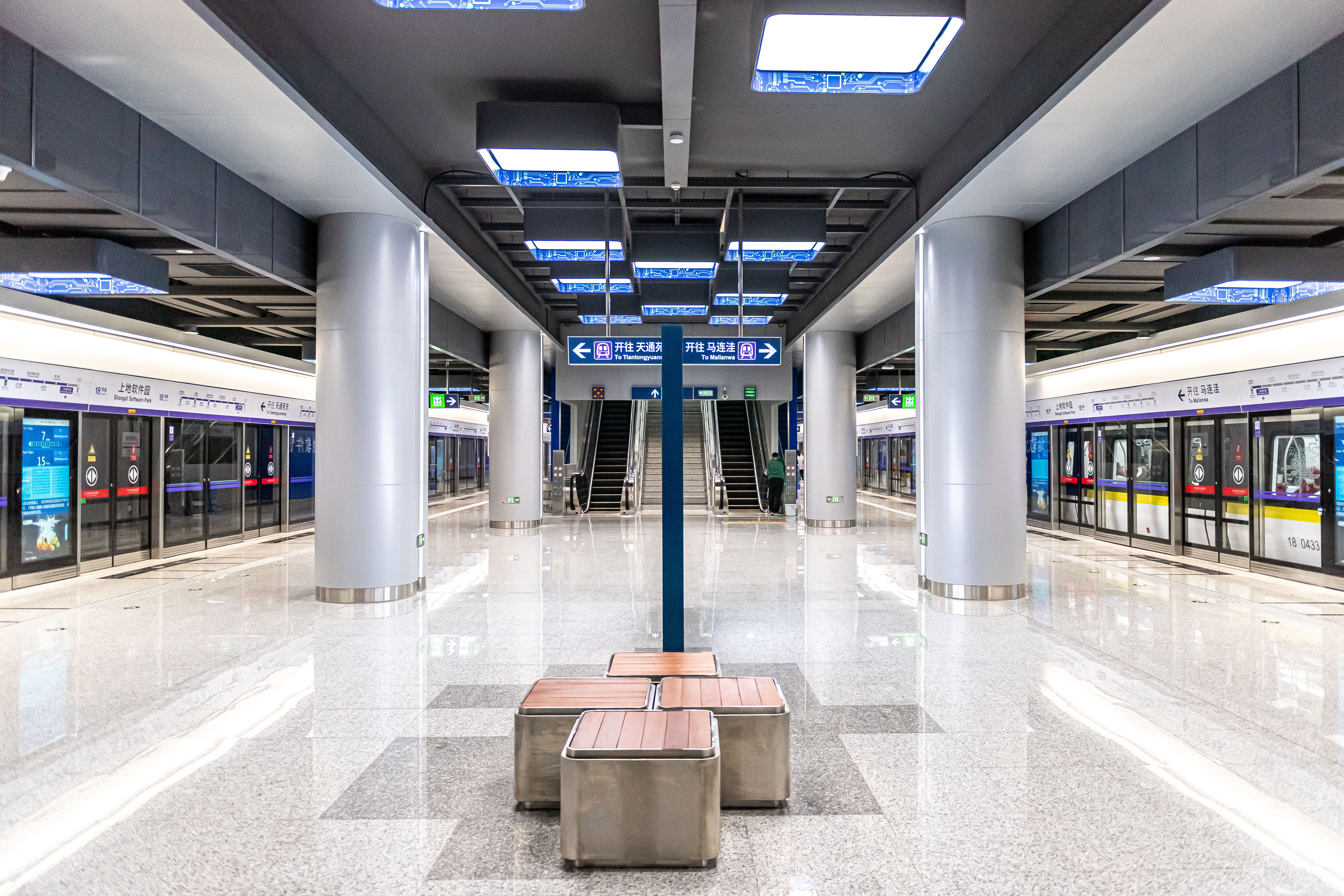
Shangdi Software Park station of Line 18

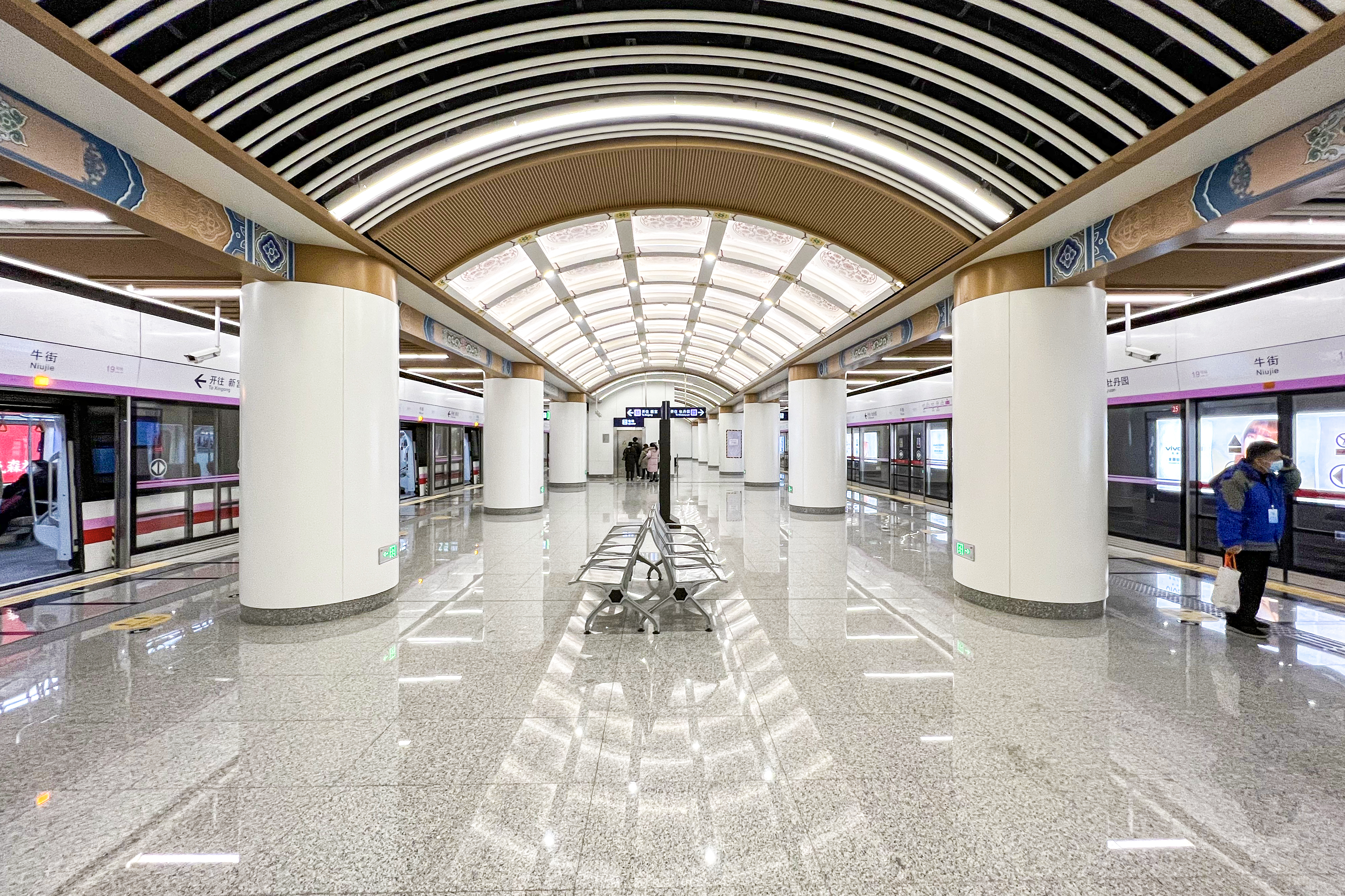
Niujie station of Line 19

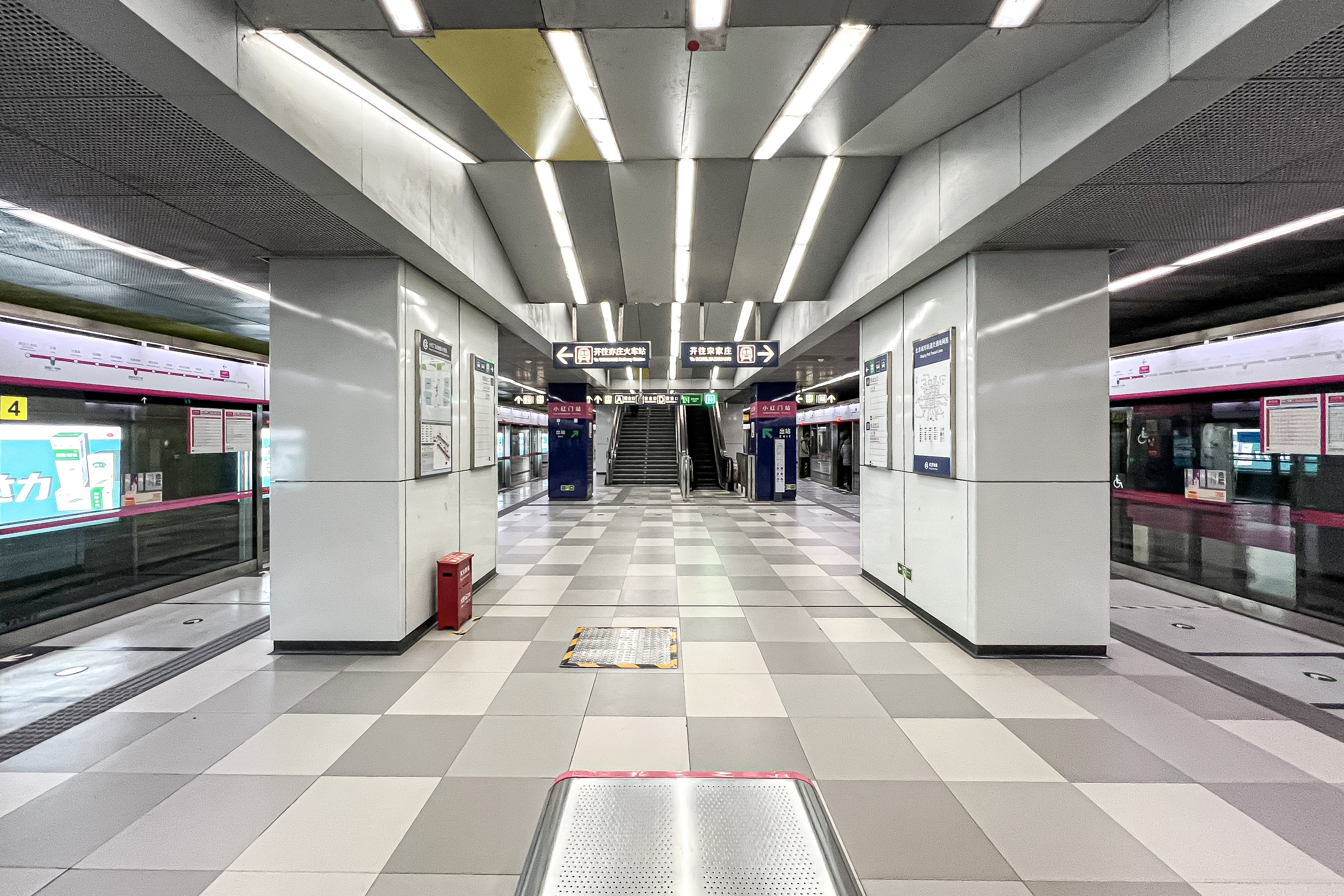
Xiaohong Men station of Yizhuang Line

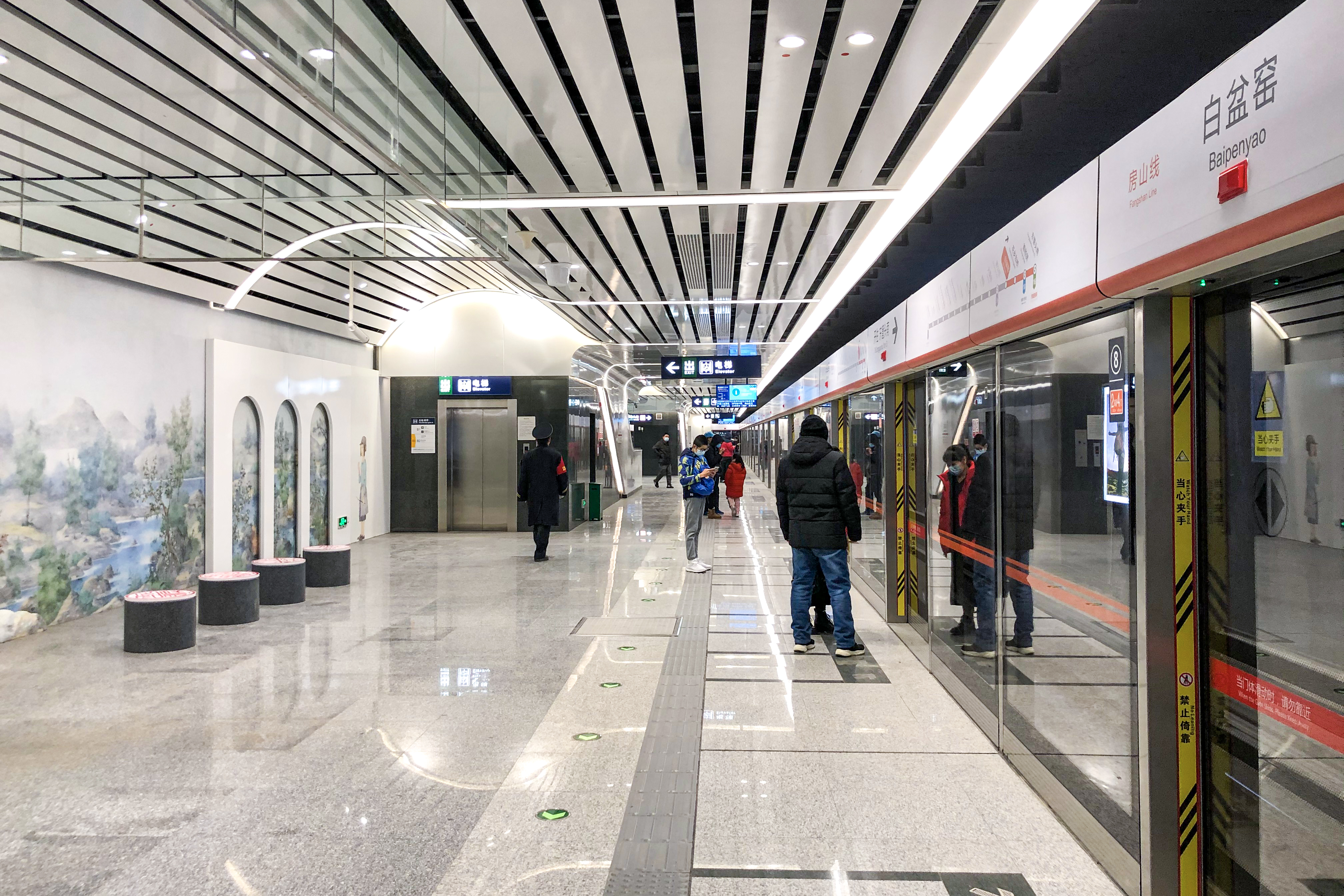
Baipenyao station of Fangshan Line

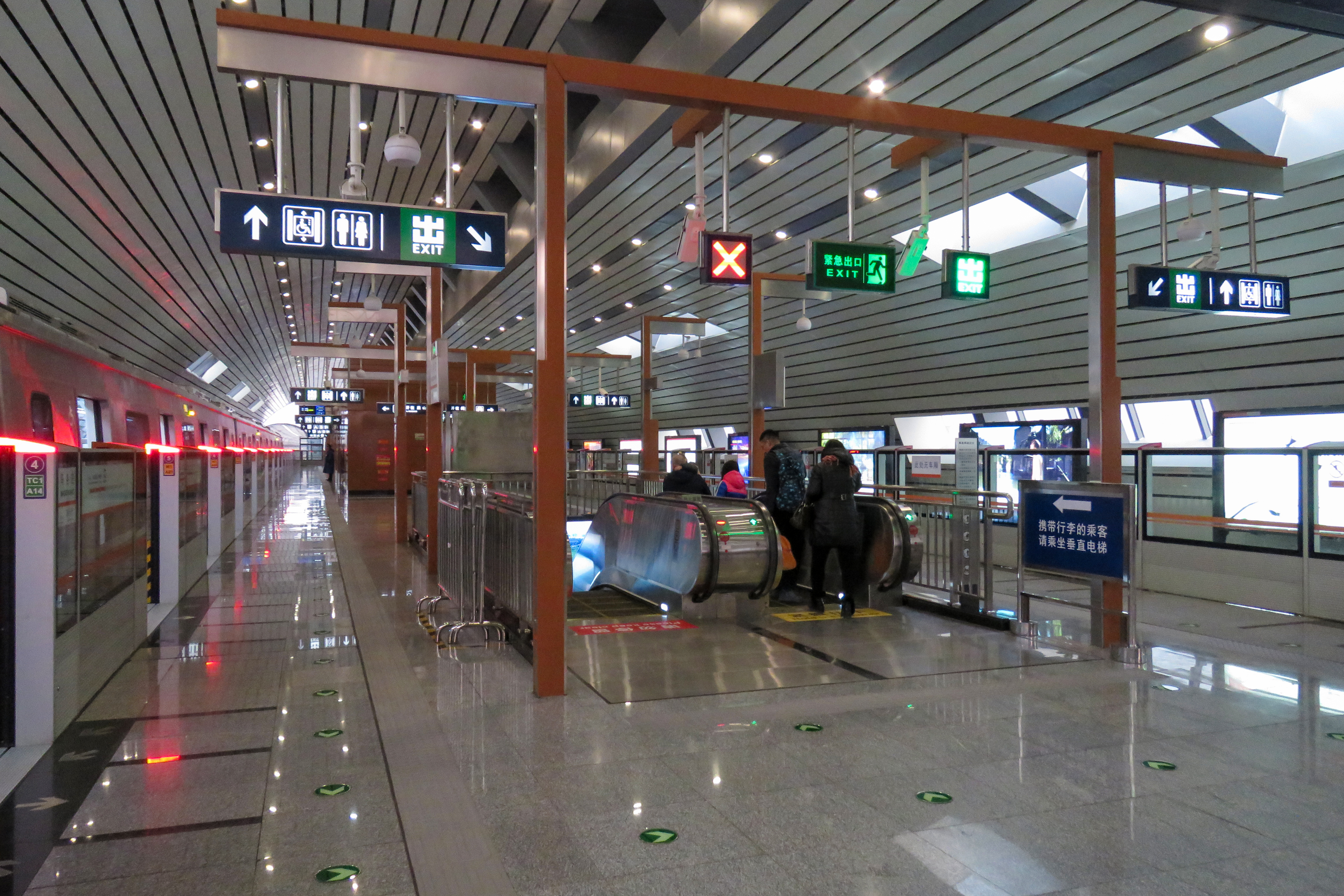
Magezhuang station of Yanfang Line

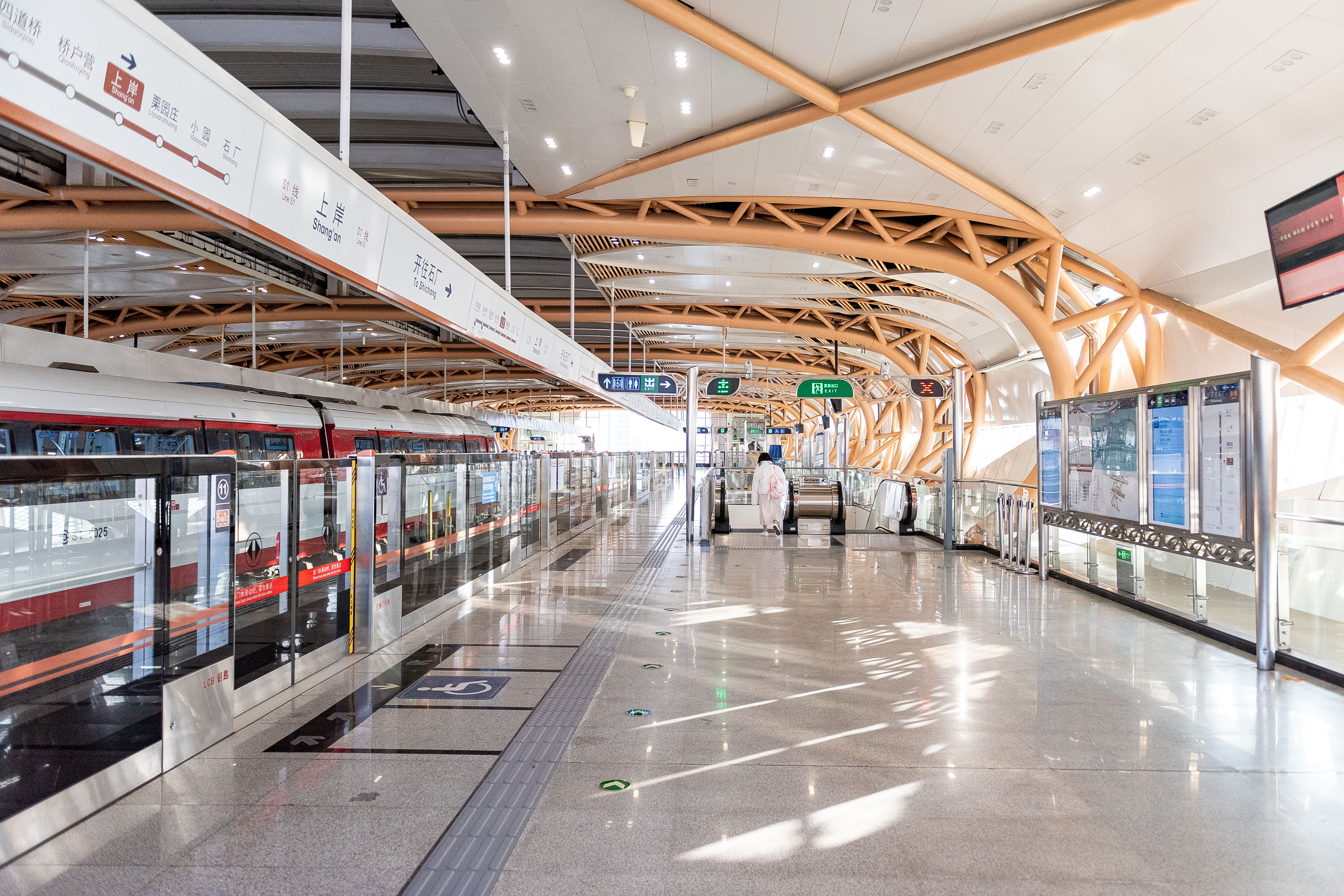
Shang'an station of Line S1

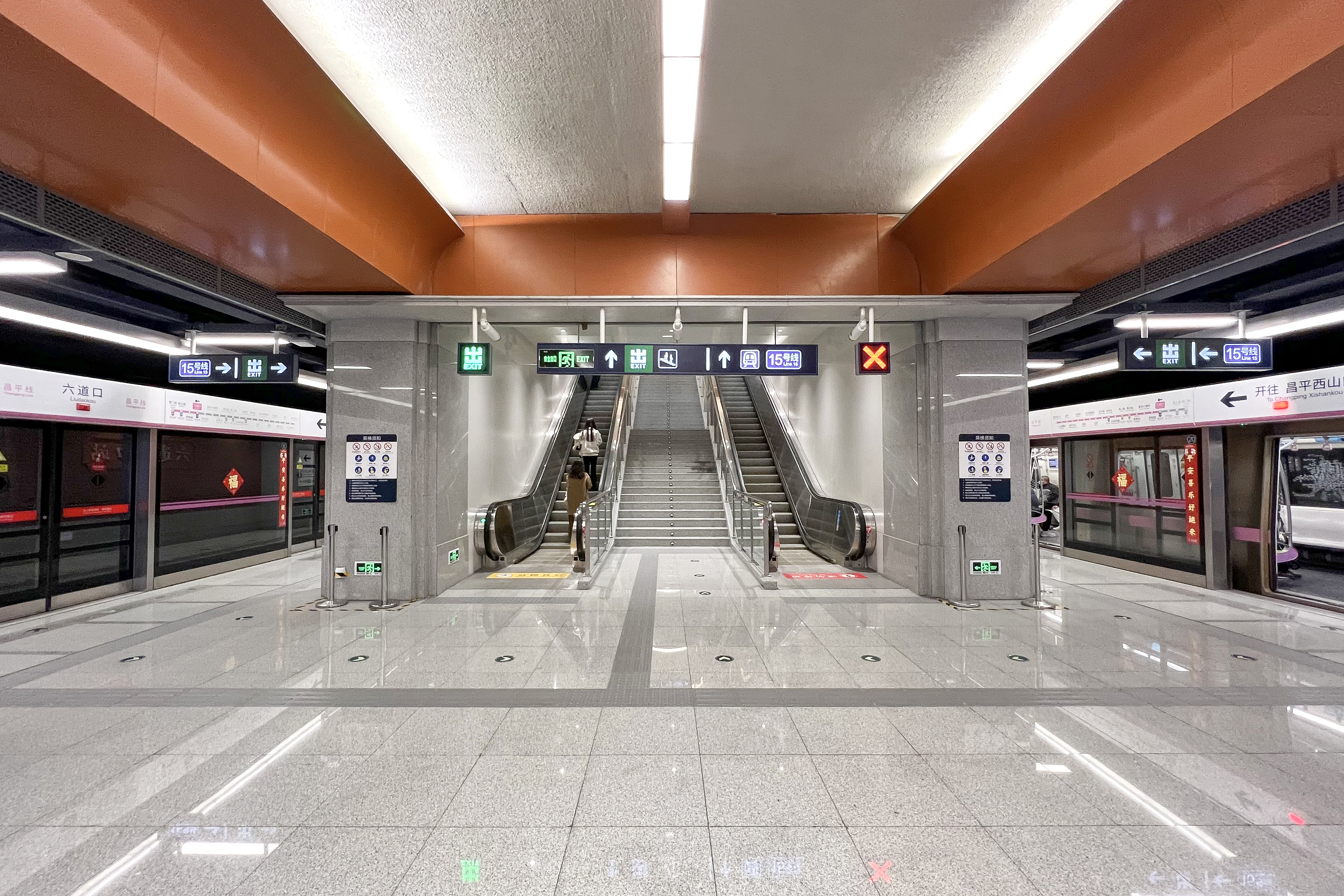
Liudaokou station of Changping Line

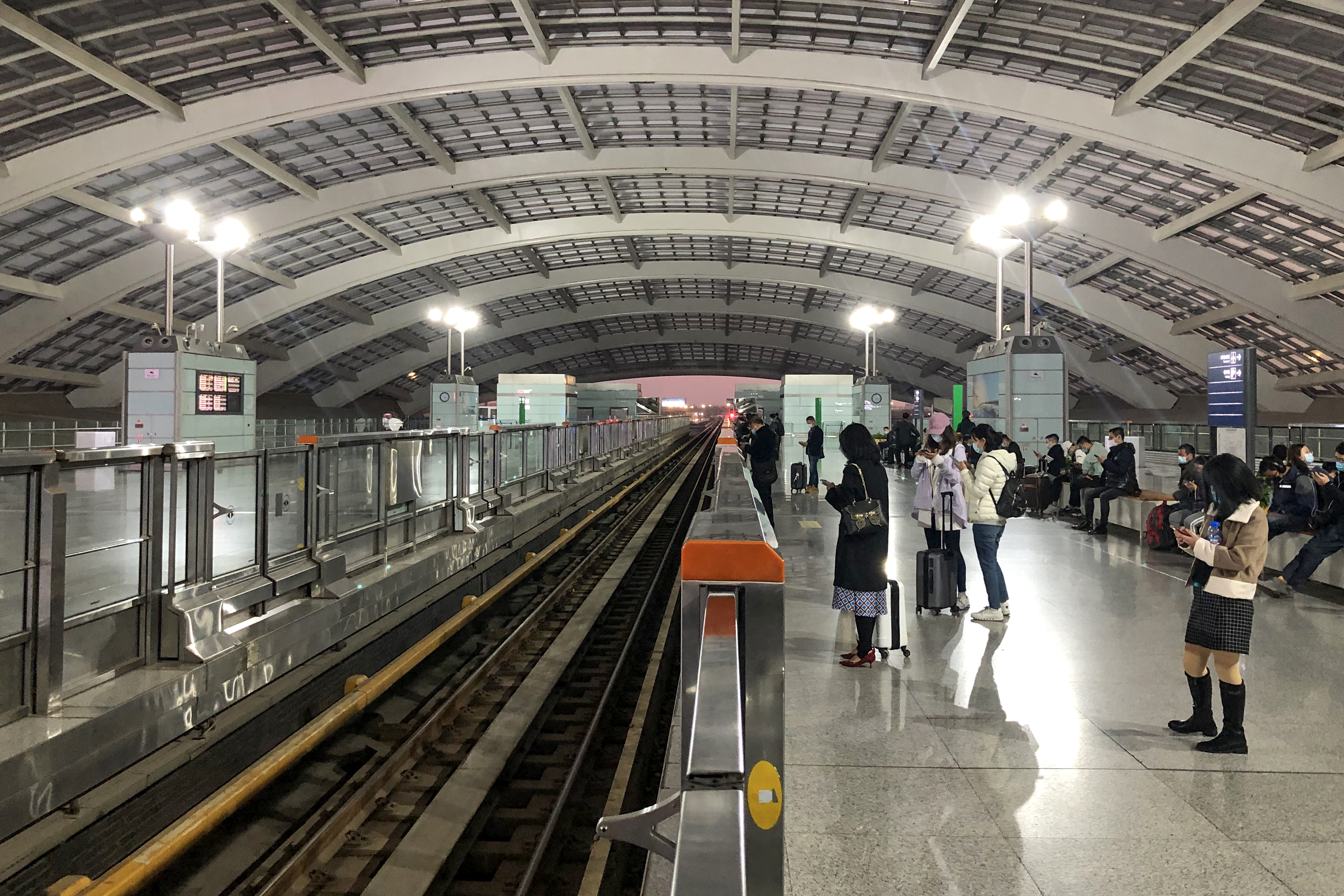
3 Hao Hangzhanlou (Terminal 3) station of Capital Airport Express

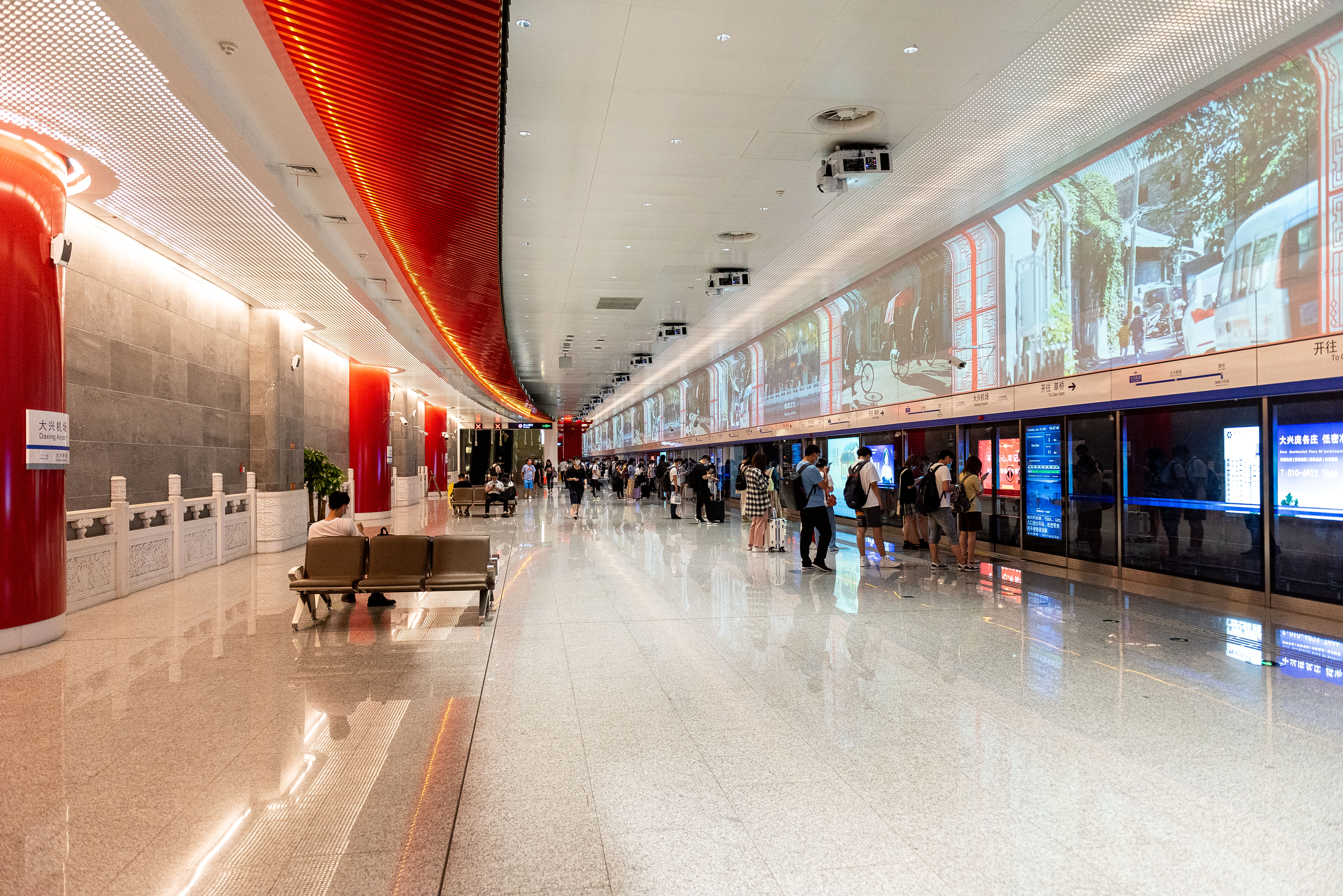
Daxing Jichang (Daxing Airport) station of Daxing Airport Express

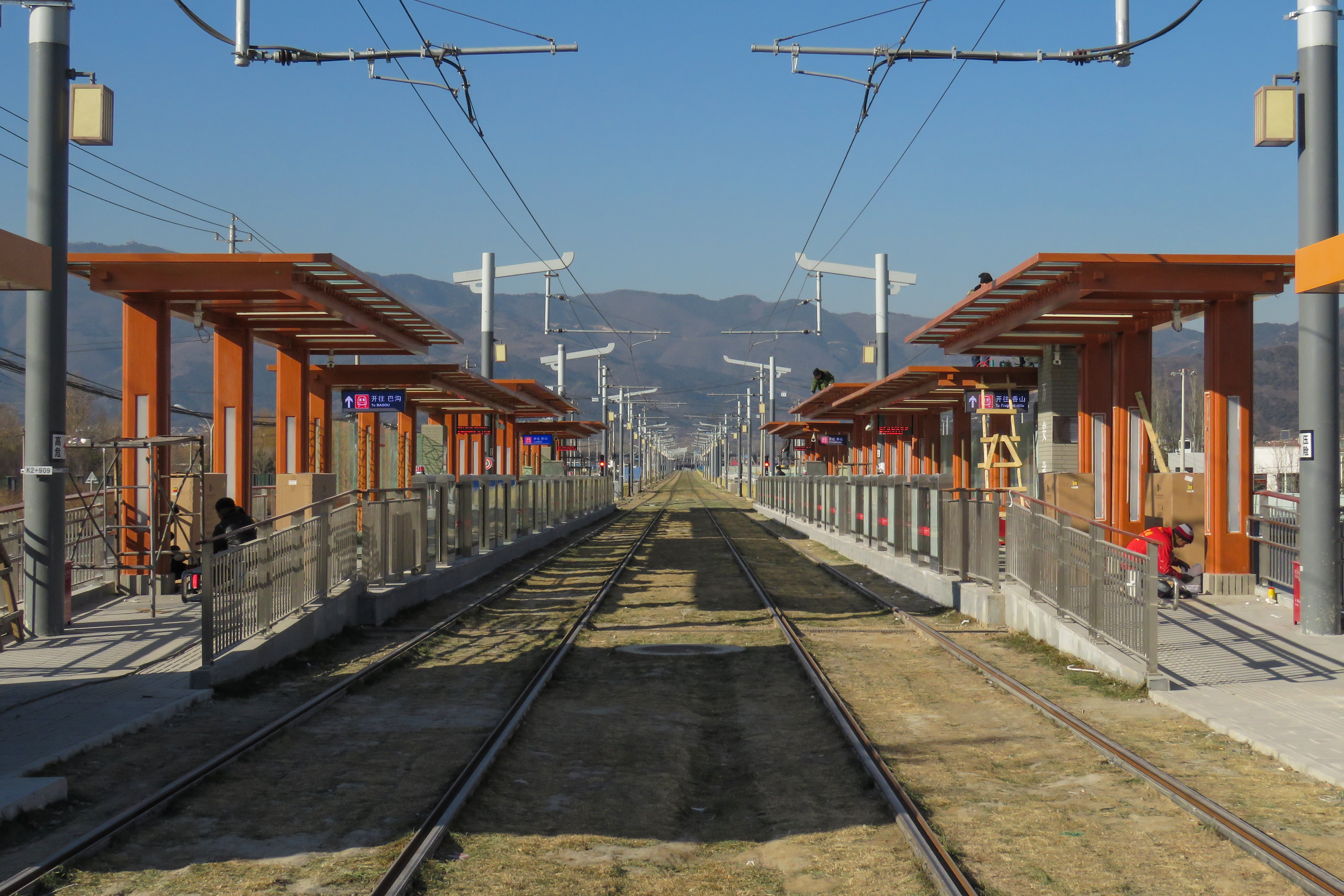
Wan'an Station of Xijiao Line

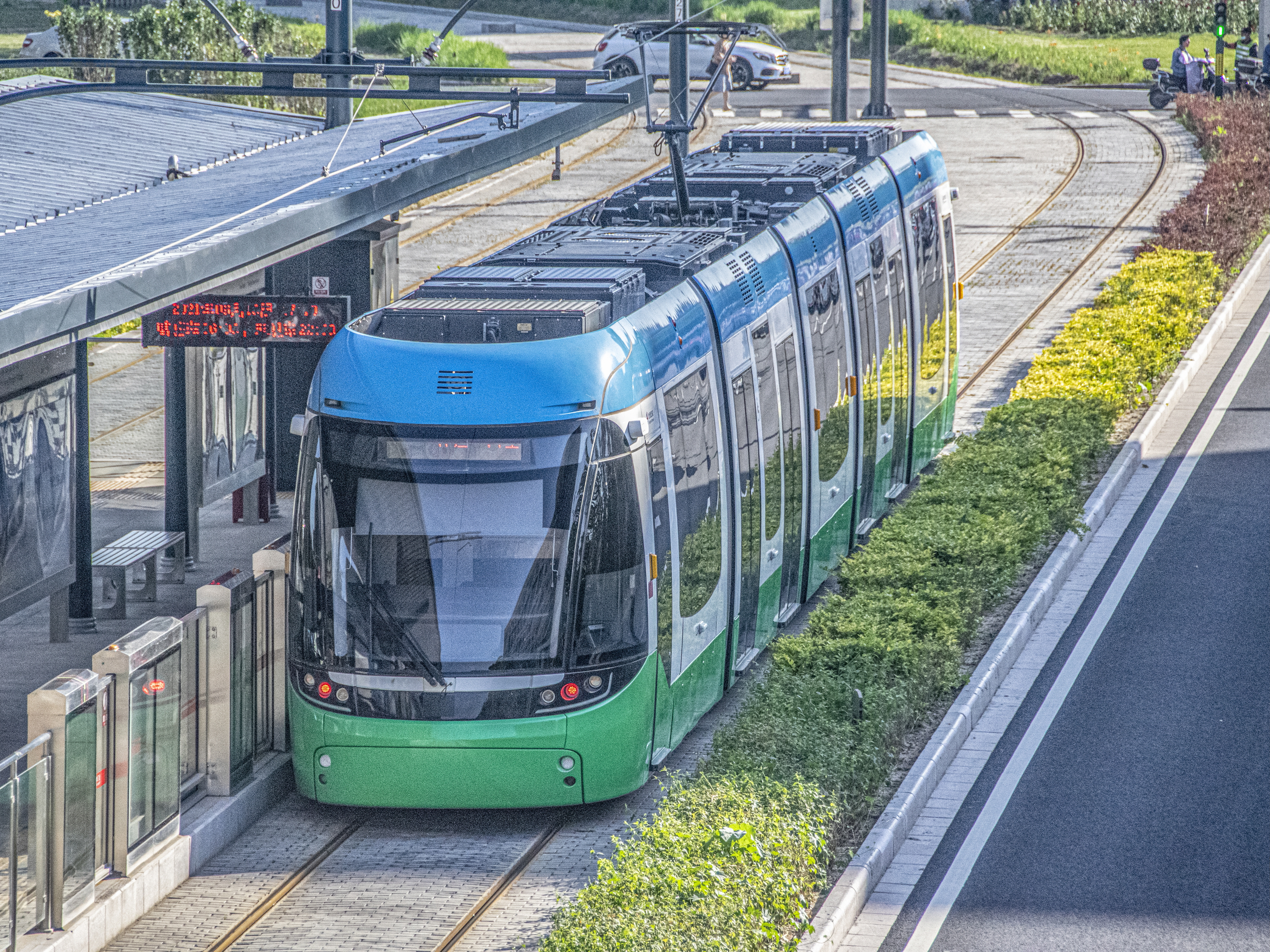
Rongchang Dongjie station of Yizhuang T1 Line

== Future expansion ==
=== Phase II ===
According to the Phase 2 construction plan approved by the NDRC in 2015, the length of Beijing Subway will reach 998.5 km (620.4 mi) when Phase 2 construction is finished. By then, public transit will comprise 60% of all trips. Of those, the subway will comprise 62%. The adjustment of the Phase 2 construction plan was approved by the NDRC on December 5, 2019. Which altered and expanded some projects in the Phase 2 construction plan. Including adjusting alignments of Line 22 and Line 28 and additional projects such as the Daxing Airport Express north extension, the west section of Line 11 and transforming Line 13 into two lines (Lines 18 and 13, known as 13A and 13B during construction).

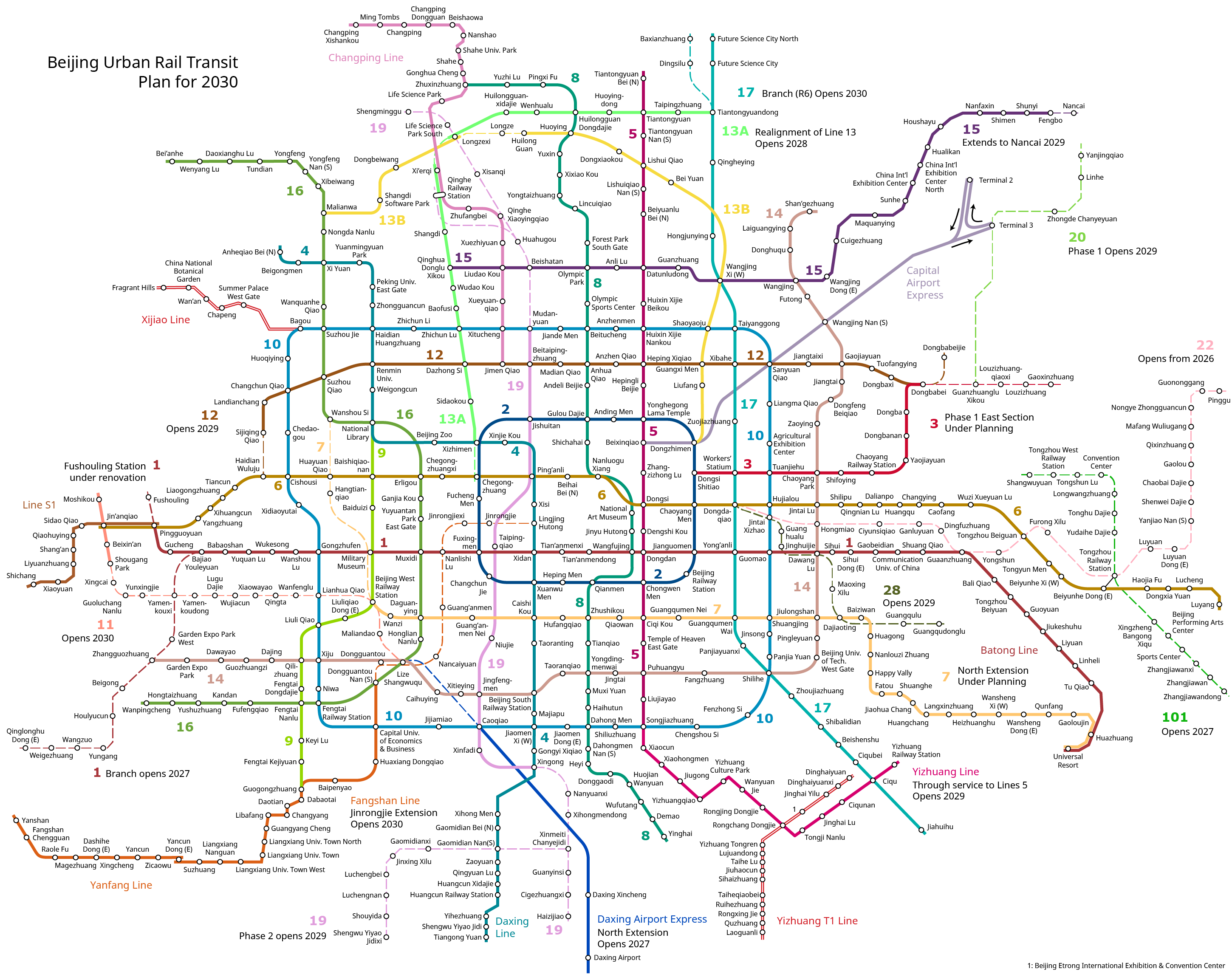
A map showing Beijing subway lines currently in operation (solid lines) and subway lines approved by the NDRC (dashed lines). The map is not drawn to scale.

Future Expansion (Phase 2)
Planned opening	Line	Phase & Section	Terminals (District)		Route Description	Construction since	Length (km)	Stations	Status	Refs
2026	22 ( Pinggu )	Initial section	Hongmiao (Chaoyang)	Pinggu (Pinggu)		2021	78.7	20	In testing	
2027	1	Renovation on Fushouling station	Pingguoyuan (Shijingshan)	Fushouling (Shijingshan)		2020	1.6	2	Under construction	
2027	13	Longzexi to Longze section	Longzexi (Changping)	Longze (rebuilt) (Changping)		2024	1.1	1	Under construction	
2027	Daxing Airport	North extension	Lize Shangwuqu (Fengtai)	Caoqiao (Fengtai)		2020	3.5	1	Under construction	
2028	18	South extension (13A split new section)	Dazhong Si (Haidian)	Chegongzhuang (Xicheng)		2024	TBD	3	Under construction	
2028	Yizhuang	Phase 2	Yizhuang railway station (Tongzhou)	Taihu (Tongzhou)		2026	1.7	1	Under construction	
2029	22 ( Pinggu )	Rear section	Dongdaqiao (Chaoyang)	Hongmiao (Chaoyang)		2021	4.1	2	Under construction	
2029	28 (CBD line)		Dongdaqiao (Chaoyang)	Guangqudonglu (Chaoyang)	Runs through the Central Business District	2021	8.9	9	Under construction	
2030	3	East extension	Dongbabei (Chaoyang)	Gaoxinzhuang (Chaoyang)		2025	5.1	4	Under construction	
2030	12	East extension	Dongbabei (Chaoyang)	Dongba Beijie (Chaoyang)		2025	1.3	1	Under construction	
Total							102.7	43		

=== Phase III ===
According to the information released in July 2022, the "Beijing Rail Transit Phase III Construction Plan" includes 11 construction projects: Line 1 Branch, Line 7 Phase 3, Line 11 Phase 2, Line 15 Phase 2, Line 17 Phase 2 (Branch), Line 19 Phase 2, Line 20 Phase 1, Fangshan line (Line 25) Phase 3 (also known as Lijin Line), Line M101 Phase 1, Line S6 (New Town Link Line) Phase 1, and the connecting line between Yizhuang line, Line 5 and Line 10.

Future Expansion (Phase 3)
Planned opening	Line	Phase & Section	Terminals (District)		Route Description	Construction since	Length (km)	Stations	Status	Refs
2027	1	Branch line	Bajiao Amusement Park (Shijingshan)	Qinglonghudong (Fengtai)		2024	21	9	Under construction	
2027	M101	Phase 1	Shangwuyuan (Tongzhou)	Zhangjiawandong (Tongzhou)		2024	18.1	14	Under construction	
2028	Yizhuang - 5	Connecting tracks	Connecting Xiaocun and Songjiazhuang			2025	1.1	0	Under construction	
2029	19	North extension	Mudanyuan (Haidian)	Shengminggu (Changping)		2026	17.6	6	Under construction	
2029	19	North Branch	Shangqingqiaonan (Haidian)	Qinghe railway station (Haidian)		2026	6.8	1	Under construction	
2030	20	Phase 1	Guanzhuang Lu Xikou (Shunyi)	Yanjing Qiao (Chaoyang)		2026	21.3	5	Under construction	
TBD	15	East extension	Fengbo (Shunyi)	Nancai (Shunyi)			3.5	1	Awaiting construction	
TBD	17	Branch	Tiantongyuandong (Changping)	Beiqijia (Changping)			8.9	2	Awaiting construction	
TBD	Fangshan	Phase 3	Dongguantounan (Fengtai)	Lingjing Hutong (Xicheng)			10.9	8	Awaiting construction	
TBD	7	Phase 3	Beijing West railway station (Fengtai)	Wanshousi (Haidian)			6.4	4	In tender process	
TBD	11	Phase 2	Xinshougang (Shougang Park) (Shijingshan)	Lize Shangwuqu (Fengtai)			17.4	14	In tender process	
TBD	19	South extension	Xingong (Fengtai)	Haizijiao (Daxing)			12.6	6	In tender process	
TBD	19	South Branch	New Media Industry Base (Daxing)	Biomedical Base West (Daxing)			17.4	7	Approved	
TBD	S6 ( 21 or R6 )	Phase 1	Terminal 3 (Shunyi)	Daxing Xincheng (Daxing)			64.4	9	Approved	
Total							230.4	88		

== Owner and operators ==
The Beijing Subway is owned by the Beijing Municipal People's Government through the Beijing Infrastructure Investment Co., LTD, (北京市基础设施投资有限公司 or BIIC), a wholly owned subsidiary of the Beijing State-owned Assets Supervision and Administration Commission (北京市人民政府国有资产监督管理委员会 or Beijing SASAC), the municipal government's asset holding entity.

The Beijing Subway was originally developed and controlled by the Central Government. The subway's construction and planning was headed by a special committee of the State Council. In February 1970, Premier Zhou Enlai handed management of the subway to the People's Liberation Army, which formed the PLA Rail Engineering Corp Beijing Subway Management Bureau. In November 1975, by order of the State Council and Central Military Commission the bureau was placed under the authority of Beijing Municipal Transportation Department.

On April 20, 1981, the bureau became the Beijing Subway Company, which was a subsidiary of the Beijing Public Transportation Company.

In July 2001, the Beijing Municipal Government reorganized the subway company into the Beijing Subway Group Company Ltd., a wholly city-owned holding company, which assumed ownership of all of the subway's assets. In November 2003, the assets of the Beijing Subway Group Company were transferred to the newly created BIIC.

The Beijing Subway has five operators:

1. The main operator is the wholly state-owned Beijing Mass Transit Railway Operation Corp. (北京市地铁运营有限公司 or Beijing Subway OpCo), which was formed in the reorganization of the original Beijing Subway Group Company in 2001, and operates 15 lines: Lines 1, 2, 5–10, 13, 15, Batong line, Changping line, Fangshan line, Yizhuang line and S1 line.
2. The Beijing MTR Corp. (北京京港地铁有限公司 or Beijing MTR), a public–private joint venture formed in 2005 by and among Beijing Capital Group, a state company under Beijing SASAC (with 49% equity ownership), MTR Corporation of Hong Kong (49%), and BIIC (2%), and operates five lines: Lines 4, 14, 16, Line 17 and Daxing line.
3. The Beijing Metro Operation Administration Corp., Ltd. (北京市轨道交通运营管理有限公司 or BJMOA), a subsidiary of Beijing Metro Construction Administration Corporation Ltd. (北京市轨道交通建设管理有限公司 or BJMCA) also under Beijing SASAC, became the third company to obtain operation rights for the Beijing Subway in 2015. The BJMOA operates the Yanfang line, Daxing Airport Express, and Line 19. Its corporate parent, BJMCA, is a general contractor for Beijing Subway construction.
4. The Beijing Public Transit Tramway Co., Ltd. (北京公交有轨电车有限公司), formed in 2017, is a wholly owned subsidiary of Beijing Public Transport Corporation (北京公共交通控股（集团）有限公司 or BPTC) that operates the Xijiao line. Its corporate parent, BPTC, is the city's main public bus operator.
5. The Beijing City Metro Ltd. (北京京城地铁有限公司), also branded as "Capital Metro" (京城地铁) in their official logo, operates the Capital Airport Express. Beijing City Metro Ltd. is a joint venture established on February 15, 2016, between Beijing Subway OpCo (51%) and BII Railway Transportation Technology Holdings Company Limited (49%)(京投轨道交通科技控股有限公司), a Hong Kong listed company (1522.HK) controlled by BIIC. On March 27, 2017, Beijing City Metro Ltd. acquired a 30-year right to operate the Capital Airport Express and sections of the Dongzhimen subway station.

== Rolling stock ==
All subway train sets run on 1,435 millimetres (56.5 in) standard gauge rail, except the maglev trains on Line S1, which run on a maglev track. Beijing Subway operates Type B trains on most lines. However, due to increasing congestion on the network, high capacity Type A trains are increasingly being used. Additionally, Type D trains are being used in express subway lines.

Until 2003 nearly all trains were manufactured by the CRRC Changchun Railway Vehicles Co., Ltd., now a division of the CRRC. The newest Line 1 trains and those on Lines 4, 8, Batong, Changping and Daxing are made by CRRC Qingdao Sifang Co., Ltd. Line S1's maglev trains were produced by CRRC Tangshan.

The Beijing Subway Rolling Stock Equipment Co. Ltd., a wholly owned subsidiary of the Beijing Mass Transit Railway Operation Corp. Ltd., provides local assemblage, maintenance and repair services.

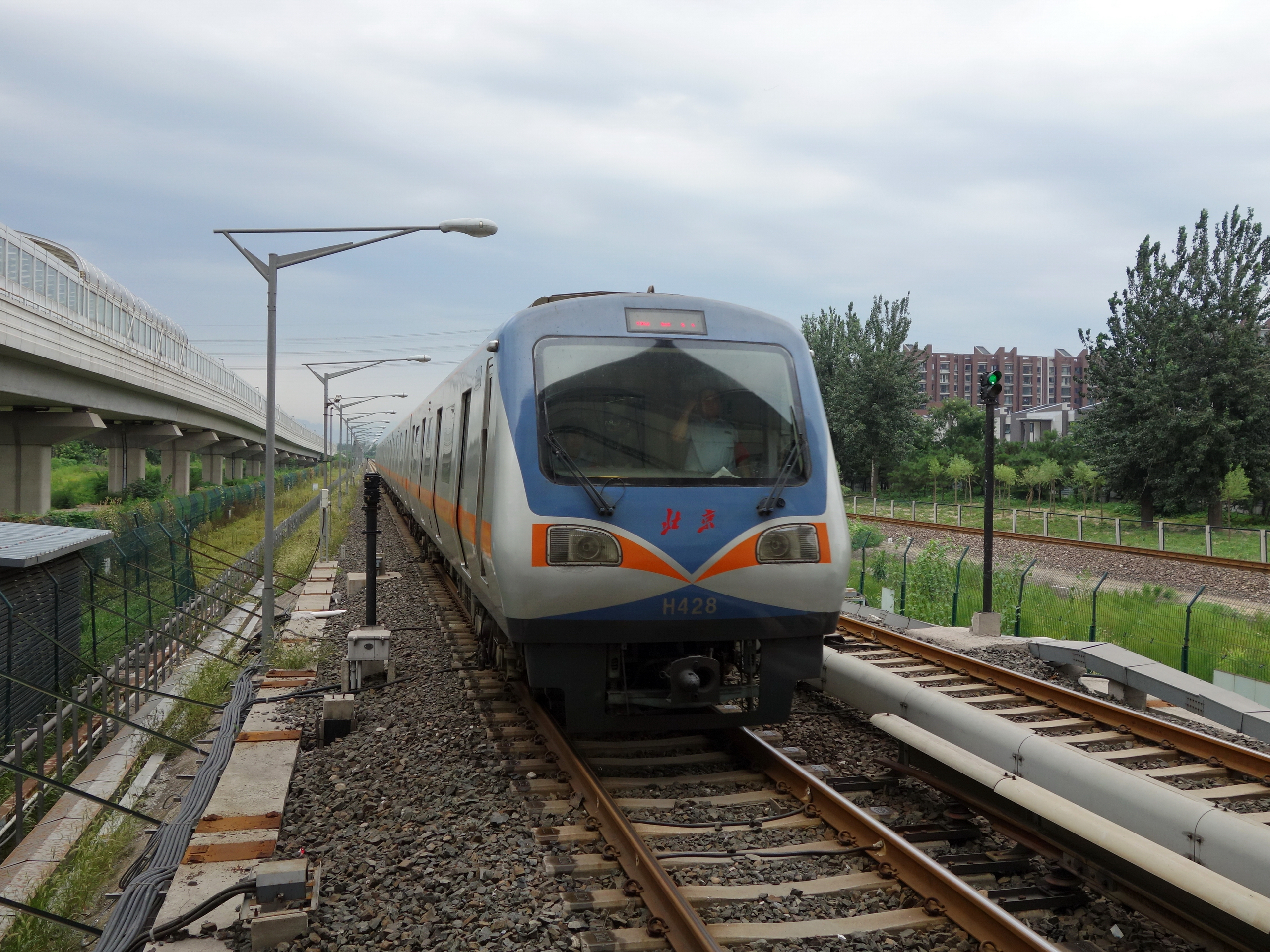
Most Beijing Subway rolling stock, such as this DKZ5 Line 13 train, run on 1,435 millimetres (56.5 in) standard gauge track, drawing 750V direct current (DC) electrical power from the third rail. Line 13, like most lines, use six-car Type-B train sets.

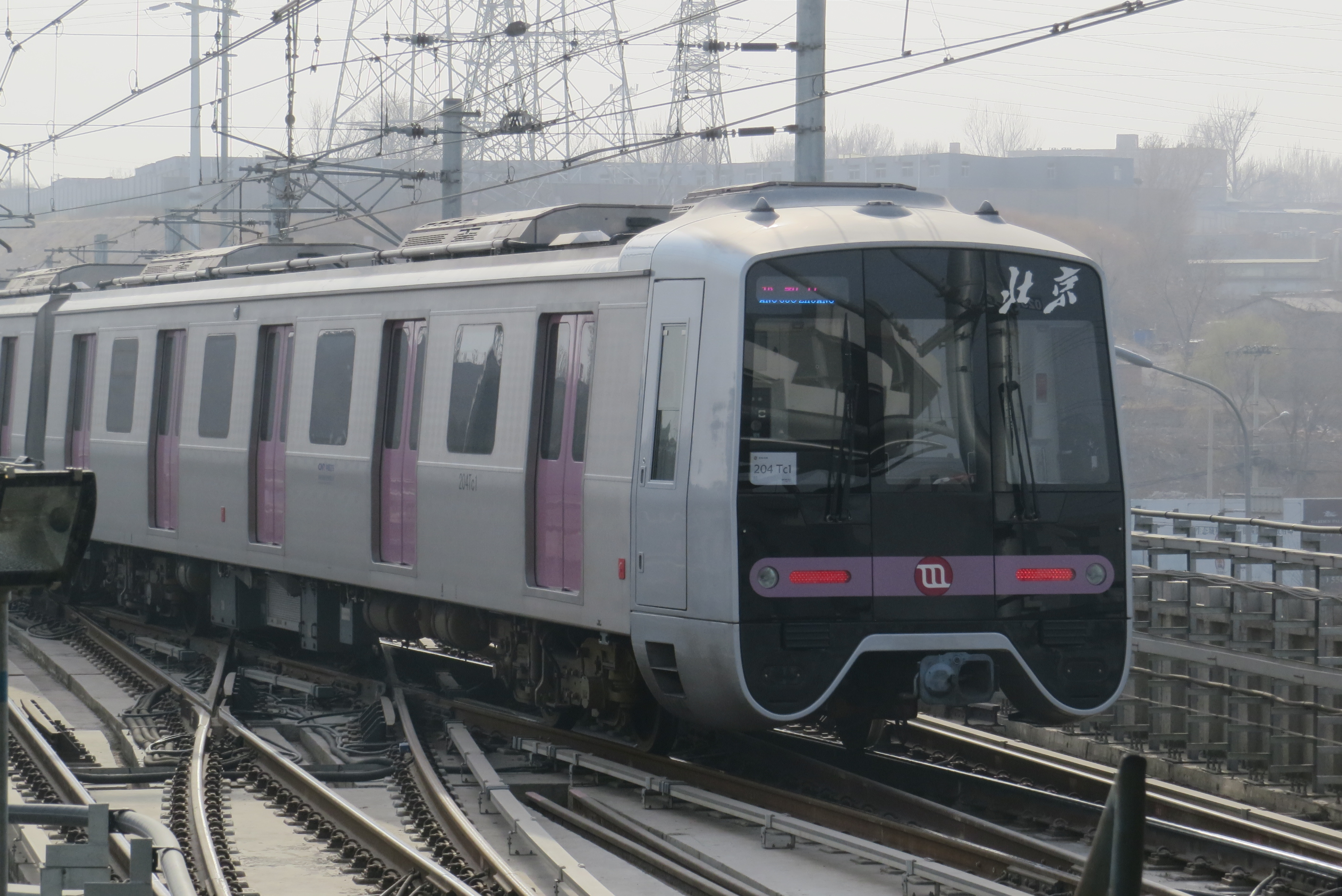
Lines 14 and 16 trains run on standard gauge track and draw 1500V DC power from overhead electrical lines. The DKZ53 train on Line 14 pictured above uses Type-A cars, which unlike the more common Type-B cars, are 3.1 meters longer and 20 cm wider, have 10 sets of doors instead of 8 sets of doors, greater passenger capacity and higher top speed.

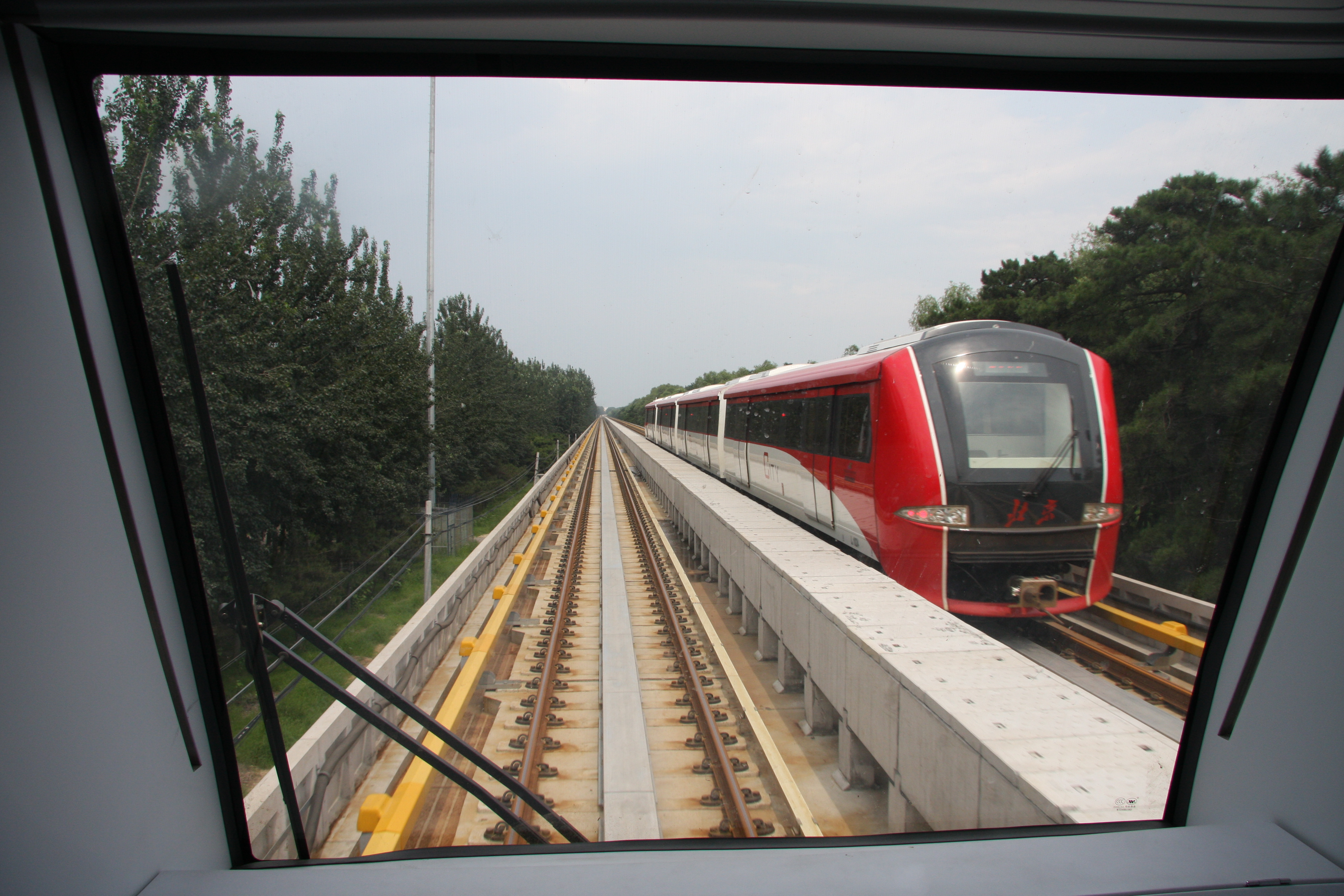
The four-car train sets of the Capital Airport Express have linear motors of instead of rotary motors. Capital Airport Express trains draw 750V DC power from the third rail, and are propelled using the aluminum strip, a "fourth rail", between the main track. Capital Airport Express trains sets are lighter than subway cars with rotary motors and can reach a top speed of 110 km/h (68 mph).

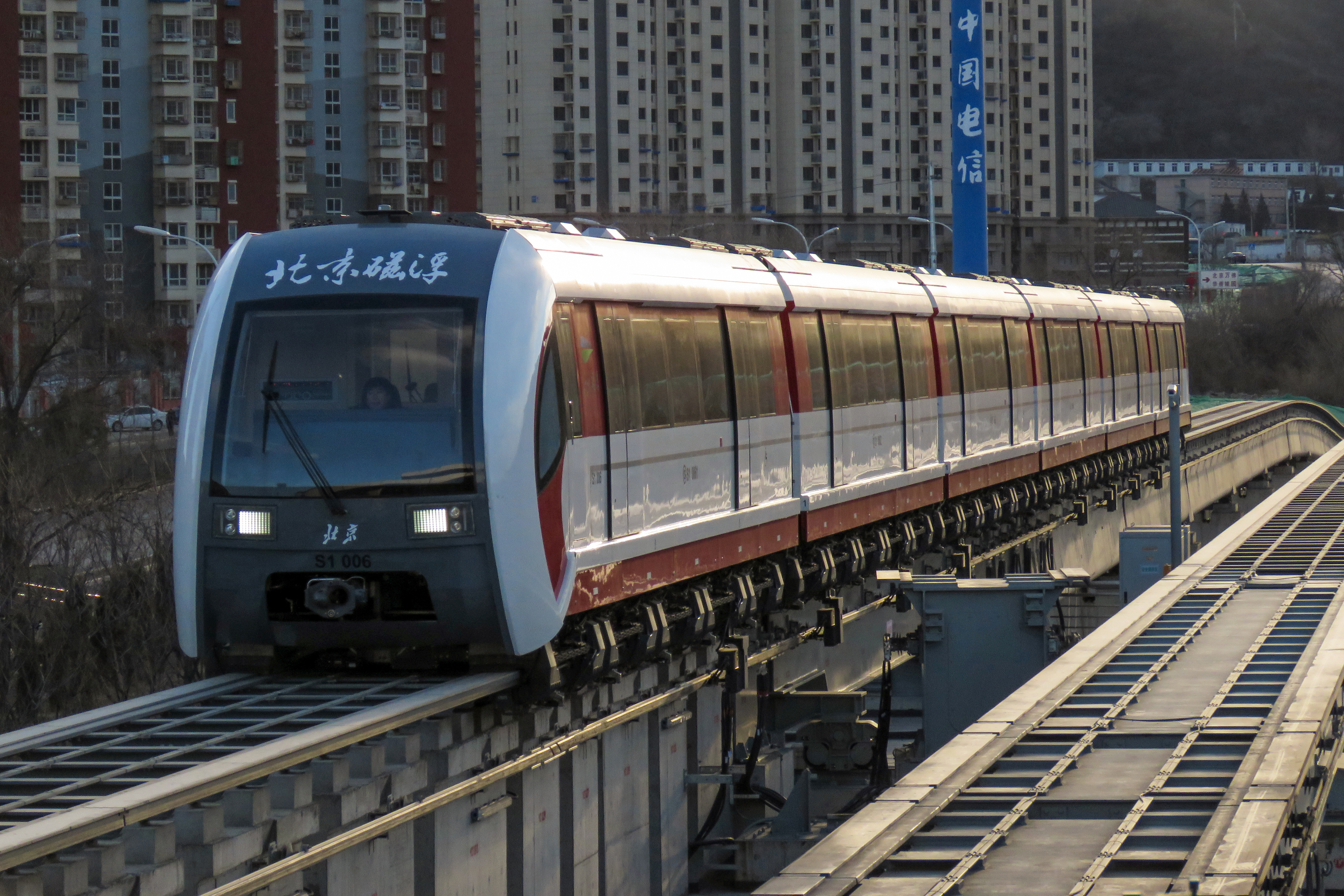
Line S1 features low-to-mid speed maglev trains that run on a maglev track and use 1,500 V DC power. The S1 maglev trains have six cars per train and can reach a top speed of 100 km/h (62 mph).

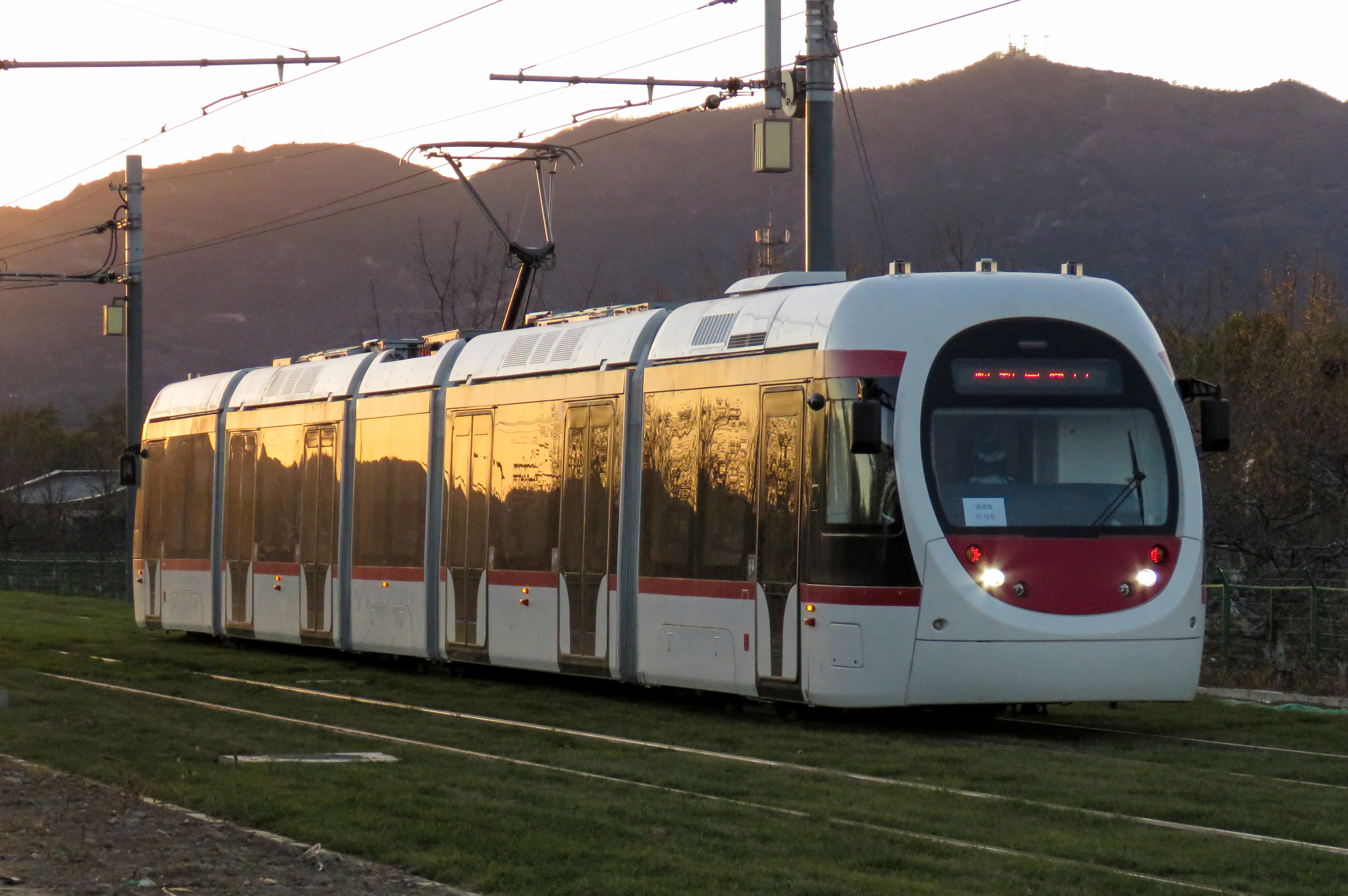
The light rail transit trams on the Xijiao (Western Suburban) line run on standard gauge track and draw power 750V alternating current (AC) electrical power from overhead lines. The Xijiao line uses five-car trams and can reach a top speed of 70 km/h (43 mph).

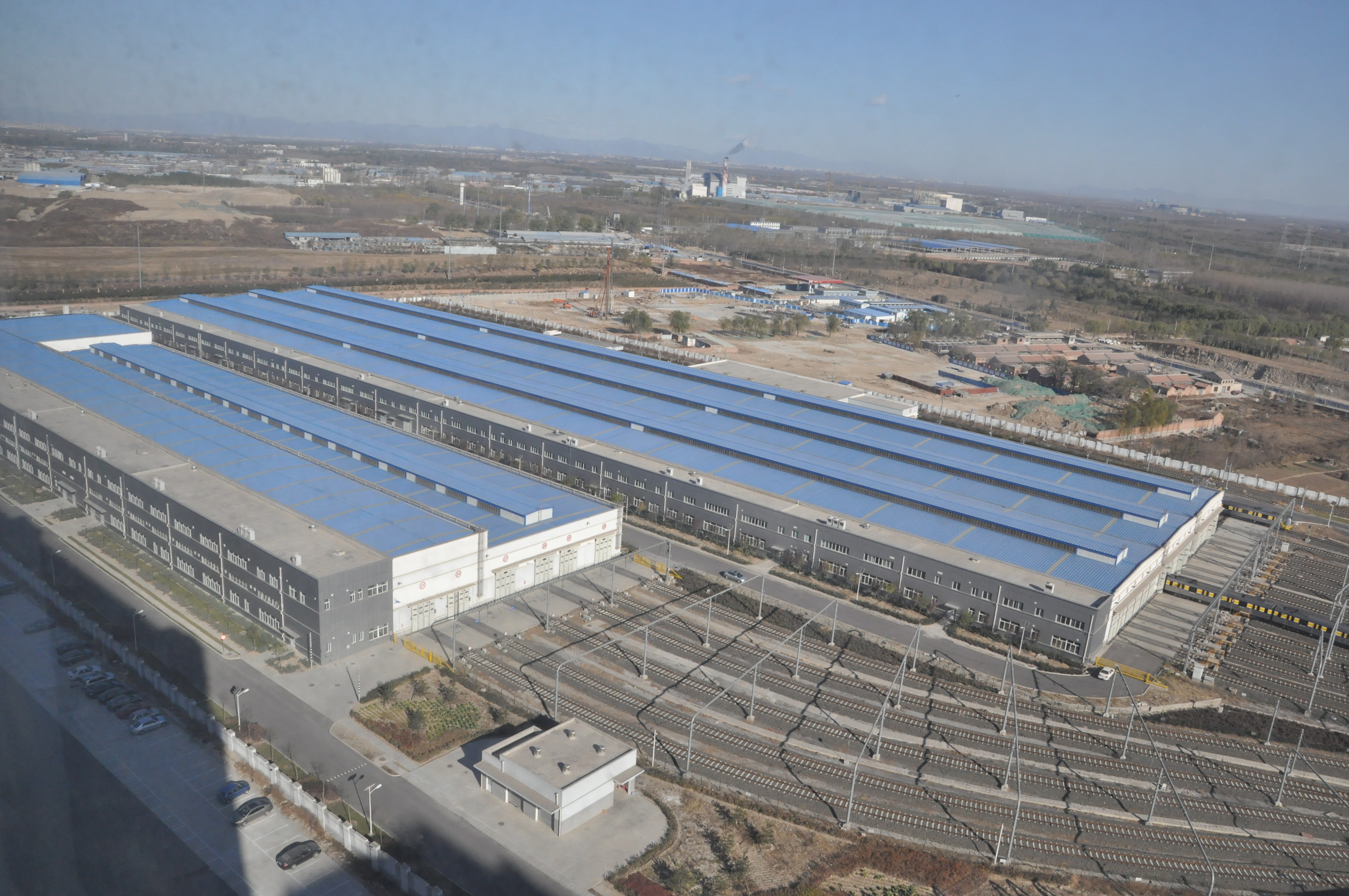
Subway rolling stock are maintained at depots such as the Wuliqiao Depot for Line 6.

=== Automated lines ===
There are 6 fully automated lines at the level of GoA4, including the Yanfang line, Line 17, Line 19, Daxing Airport Express, Line 3 and Line 12, using domestically developed communications-based train control systems.

== History ==
Schema showing the development of the Beijing Subway from 1971 to 2018

=== 1953–1965: origins ===
The subway was proposed in September 1953 by the city's planning committee and experts from the Soviet Union. After the end of the Korean War, Chinese leaders turned their attention to domestic reconstruction. They were keen to expand Beijing's mass transit capacity but also valued the subway as an asset for civil defense. They studied the use of the Moscow Metro to protect civilians, move troops and headquarter military command posts during the Battle of Moscow, and planned the Beijing Subway for both civilian and military use.

At that time, the Chinese lacked expertise in building subways and drew heavily on Soviet and East German technical assistance. In 1954, a delegation of Soviet engineers, including some who had built the Moscow Metro, was invited to plan the subway in Beijing. From 1953 to 1960, several thousand Chinese university students were sent to the Soviet Union to study subway construction. An early plan unveiled in 1957 called for one ring route and six other lines with 114 stations and 172 km (107 mi) of track. Two routes vied for the first to be built. One ran east–west from Wukesong to Hongmiao, underneath Changan Avenue. The other ran north–south from the Summer Palace to Zhongshan Park, via Xizhimen and Xisi. The former was chosen due to more favorable geological foundation and greater number of government bureaus served. The second route would not be built until construction on Line 4 began forty years later.

The original proposal called for deep subway tunnels that can better serve military functions. Between Gongzhufen and Muxidi, shafts as deep as 120 m (390 ft) were being dug. The world's deepest subway station at the time in the Kyiv Metro was only 100 m (330 ft) deep. But Beijing's high water table and high pressure head of ground water which complicated construction and posed risk of leakage, and along with the inconvenience of transporting passengers long distances from the surface, led the authorities to abandon the deep tunnel plan in May 1960 in favor of cut-and-cover shallow tunnels some 20 m (66 ft) below the surface.

The deterioration of relations between China and Soviet Union disrupted subway planning. Soviet experts began to leave in 1960, and were completely withdrawn by 1963. In 1961, the entire project was halted temporarily due to severe hardships caused by the Great Leap Forward. Eventually, planning work resumed. The route of the initial line was shifted westward to create an underground conduit to move personnel from the heart of the capital to the Western Hills. On February 4, 1965, Chairman Mao Zedong personally approved the project.

=== 1965–1981: slow beginning ===
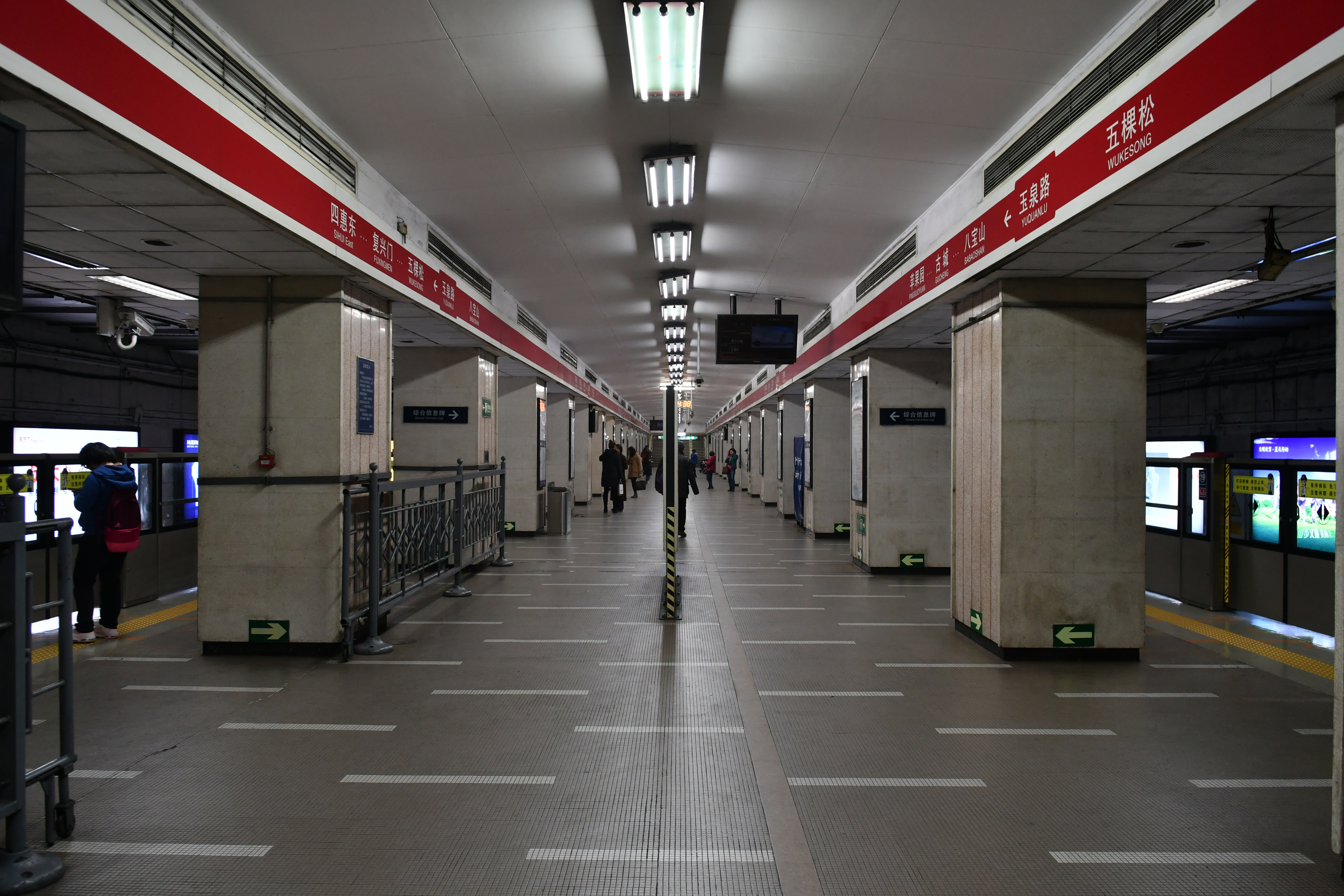
Yuquanlu Station, Opened on August 5, 1971. The first phase of the Beijing subway project groundbreaking ceremony was held west of Yuquanlu Road.

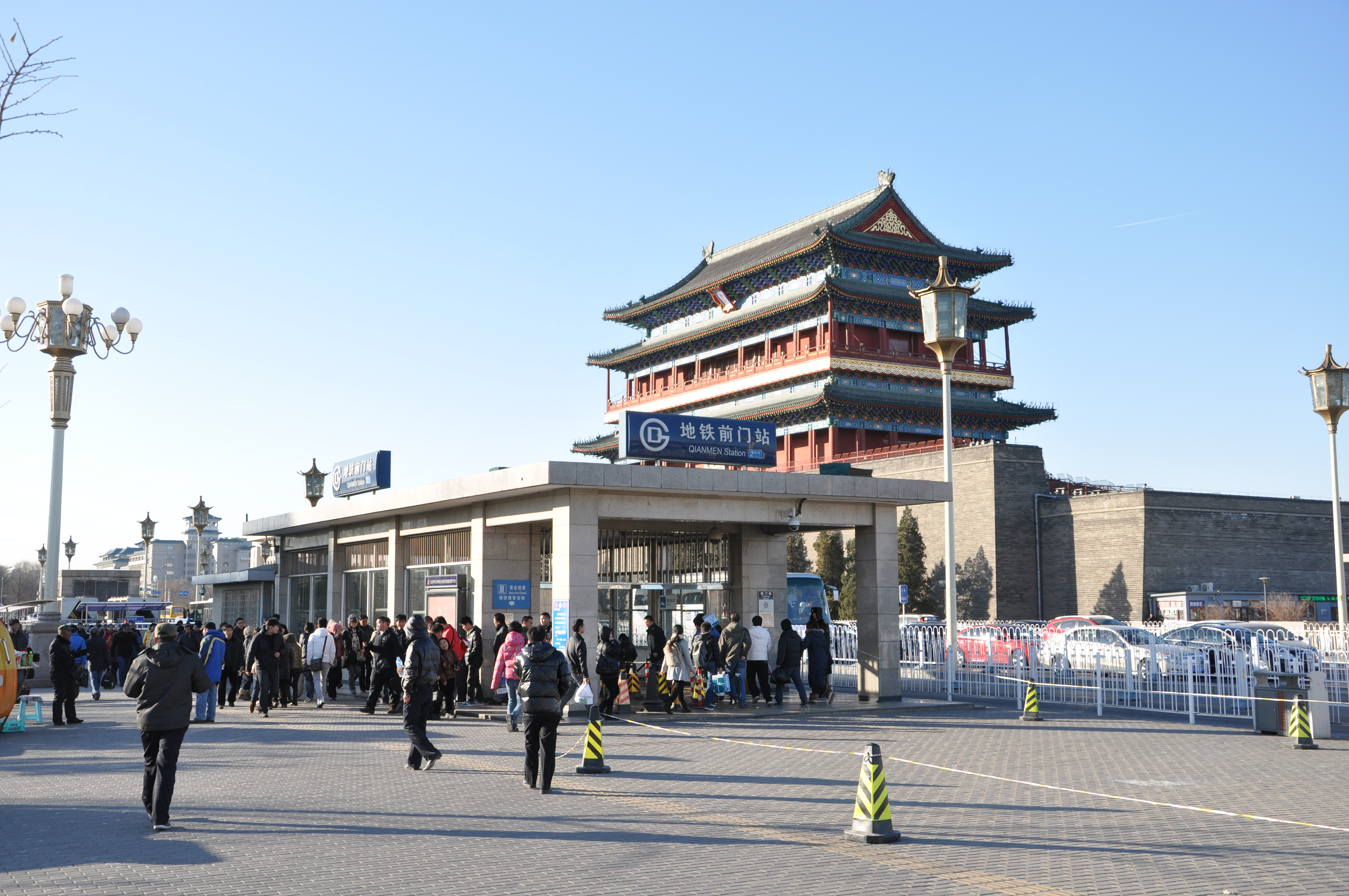
Many areas of Beijing's city walls were torn down during the construction of the subway. The route of the initial subway line was slightly altered to save the Qianmen gate.

Construction began on July 1, 1965, at a groundbreaking ceremony attended by several national leaders including Zhu De, Deng Xiaoping, and Beijing mayor Peng Zhen. The most controversial outcome of the initial subway line was the demolition of the Beijing's historic inner city wall to make way for the subway. Construction plans for the subway from Fuxingmen to the Beijing Railway Station called for the removal of the wall, as well as the gates and archery towers at Hepingmen, Qianmen, and Chongwenmen. Leading architect Liang Sicheng argued for protecting the wall as a landmark of the ancient capital. Chairman Mao favored demolishing the wall over demolishing homes. In the end, Premier Zhou Enlai managed to preserve several walls and gates, such as the Qianmen gate and its arrow tower by slightly altering the course of the subway.

Plans of the Beijing Subway network

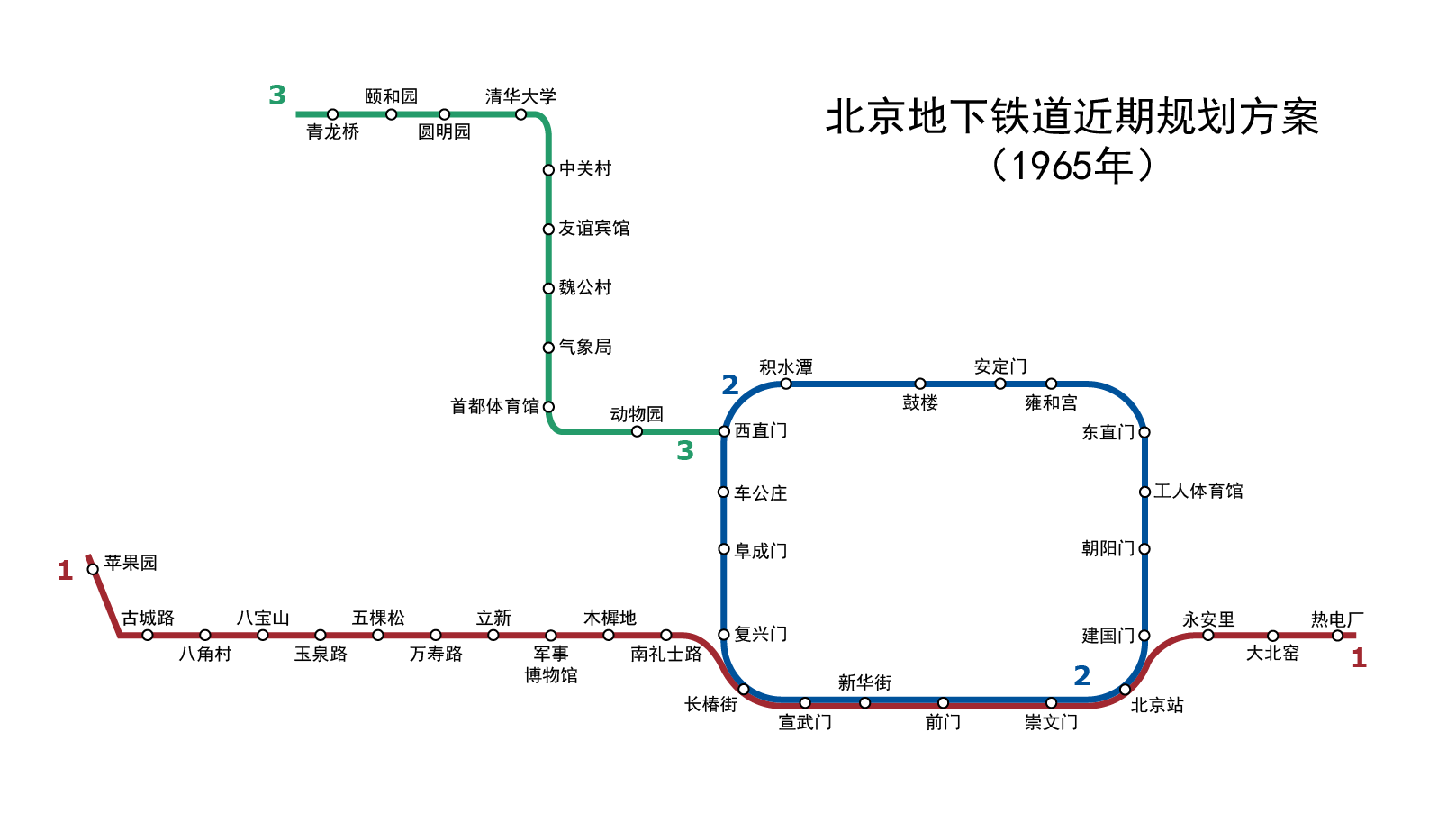
1965 Plan

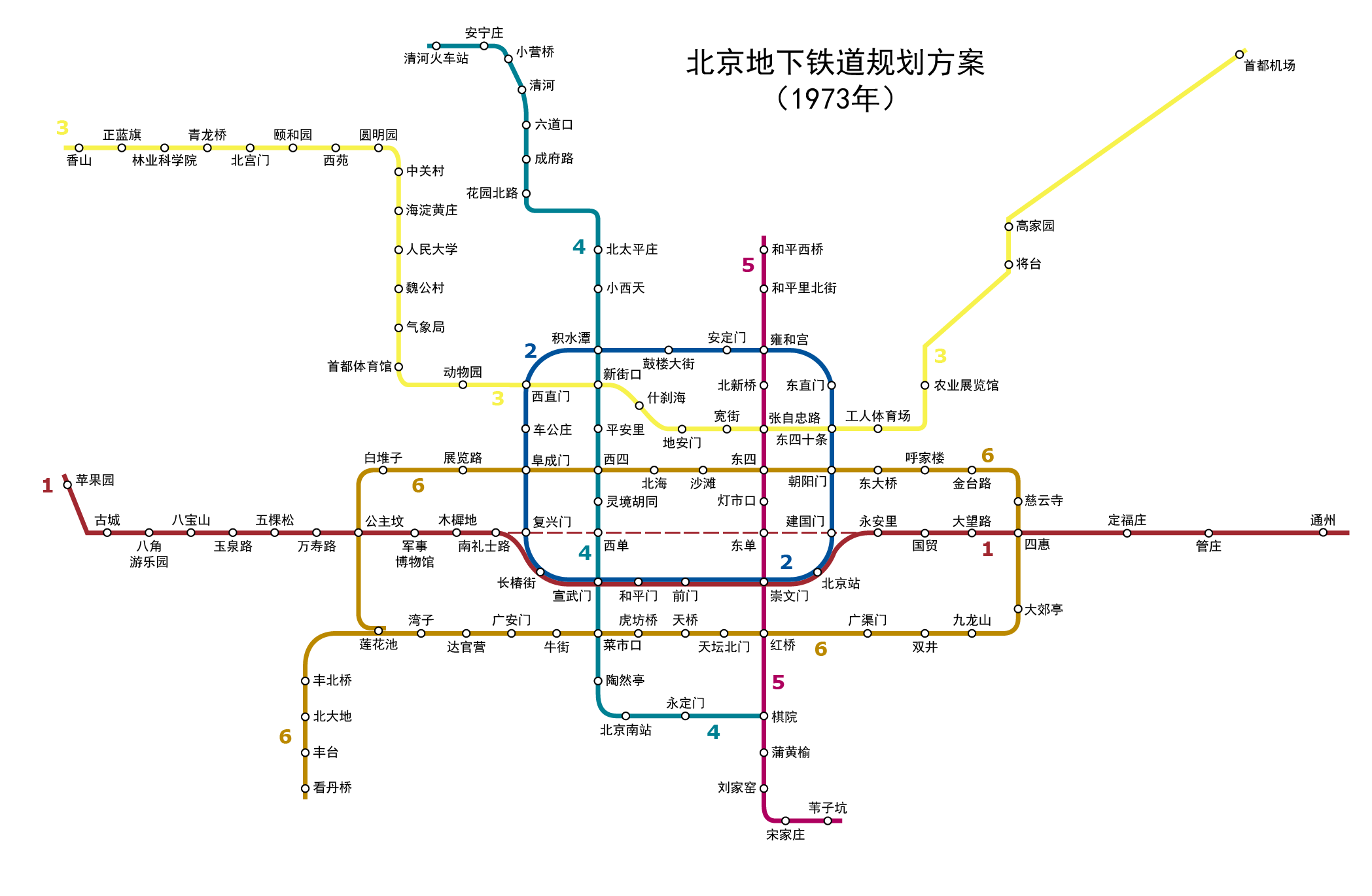
1973 Plan

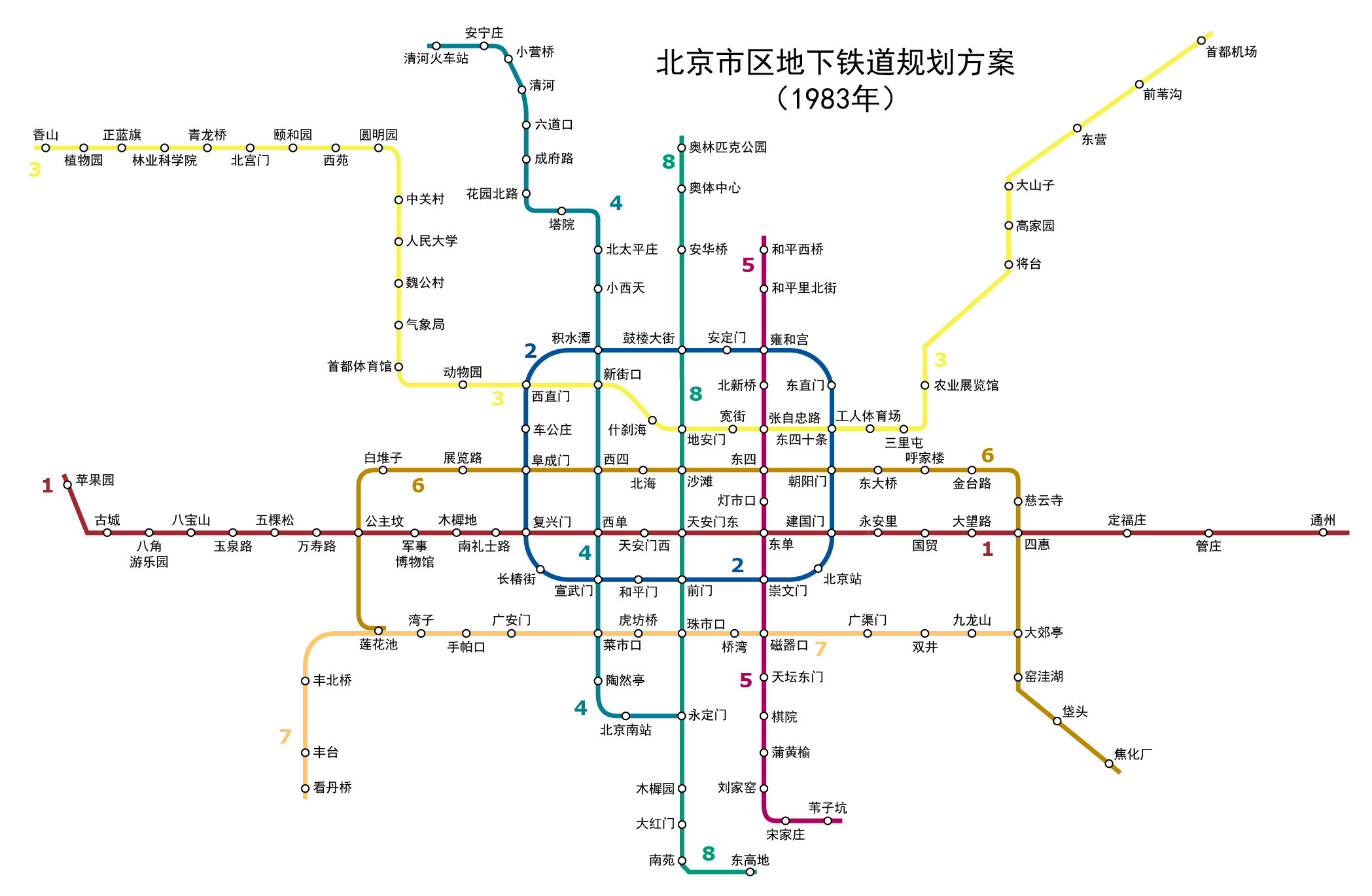
1983 Plan

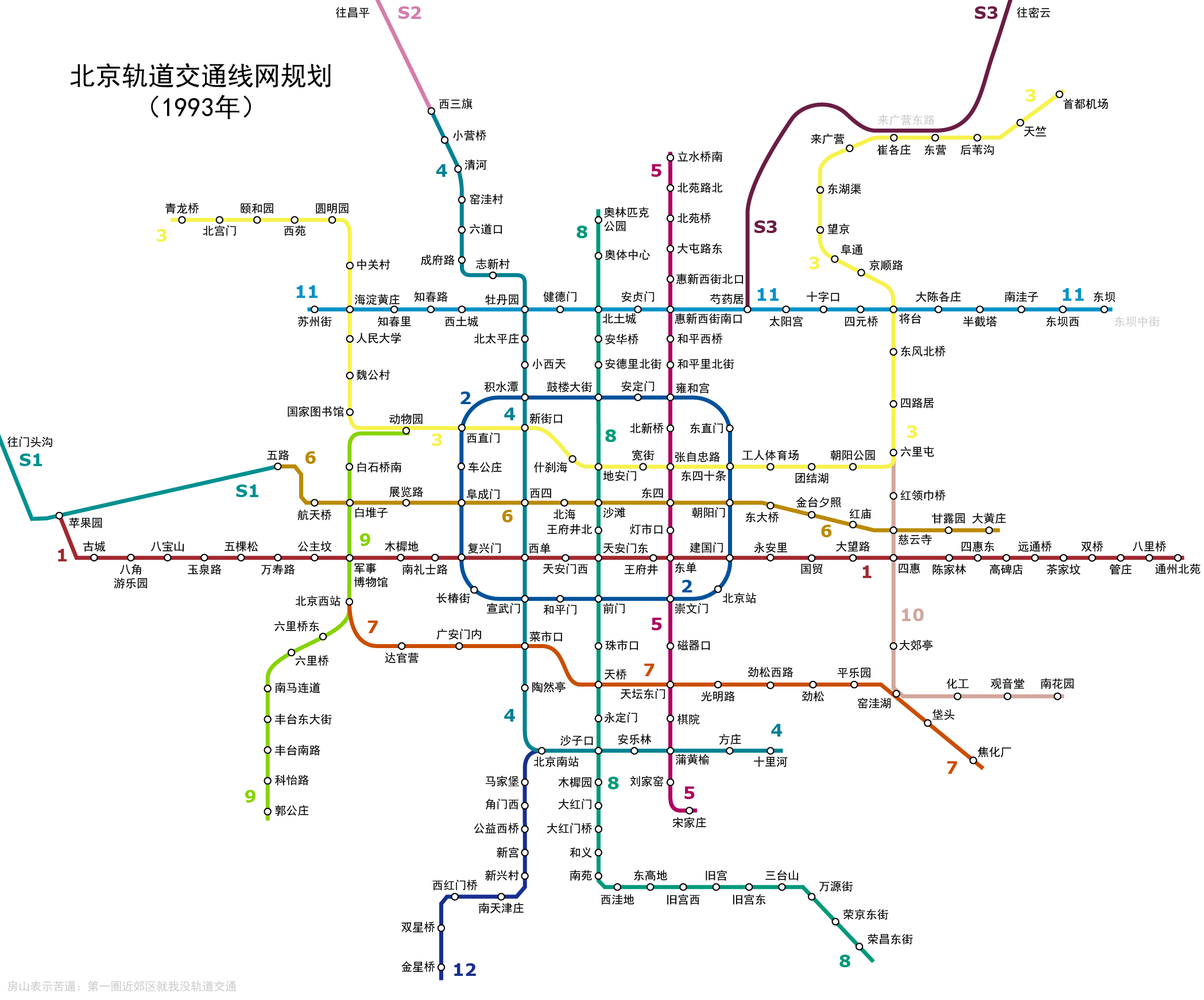
1993 Plan

The initial line was completed and began trial operations in time to mark the 20th anniversary of the founding of the People's Republic on October 1, 1969. It ran 21 km (13 mi) from Gucheng to the Beijing Railway Station and had 16 stations. This line forms parts of present-day Lines 1 and 2. It was the first subway to be built in China, and predates the metros of Hong Kong, Seoul, Singapore, San Francisco, and Washington, D.C., but technical problems would plague the project for the next decade.

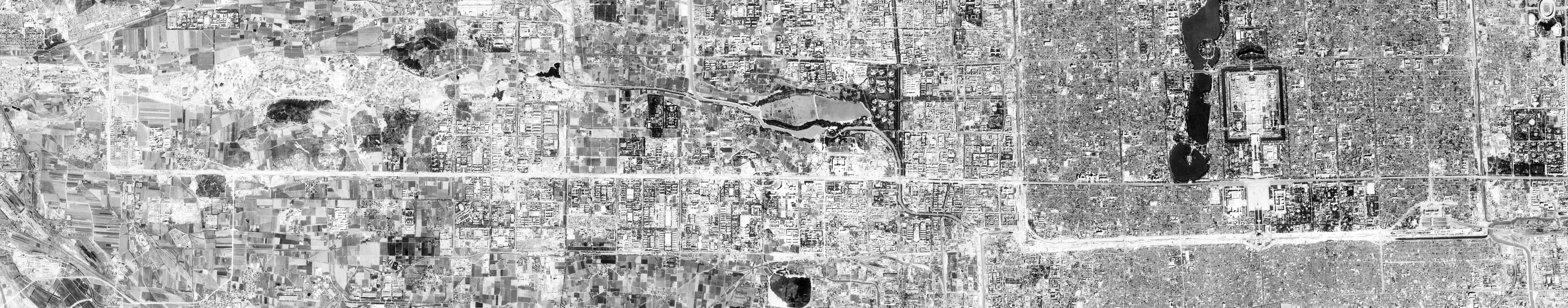
Satellite image of the construction of initial line shot by US spy satellite Corona KH-4B on September 20, 1967.

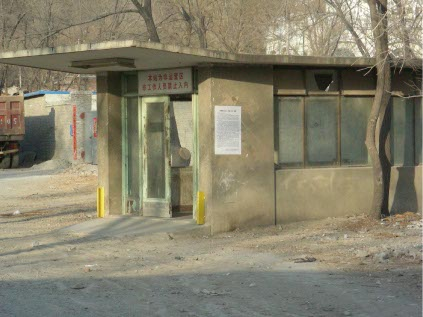
Entrance to the Fushouling station, once designated terminus of Line 1 but was not opened to the public. The station eventually opened in 2024.

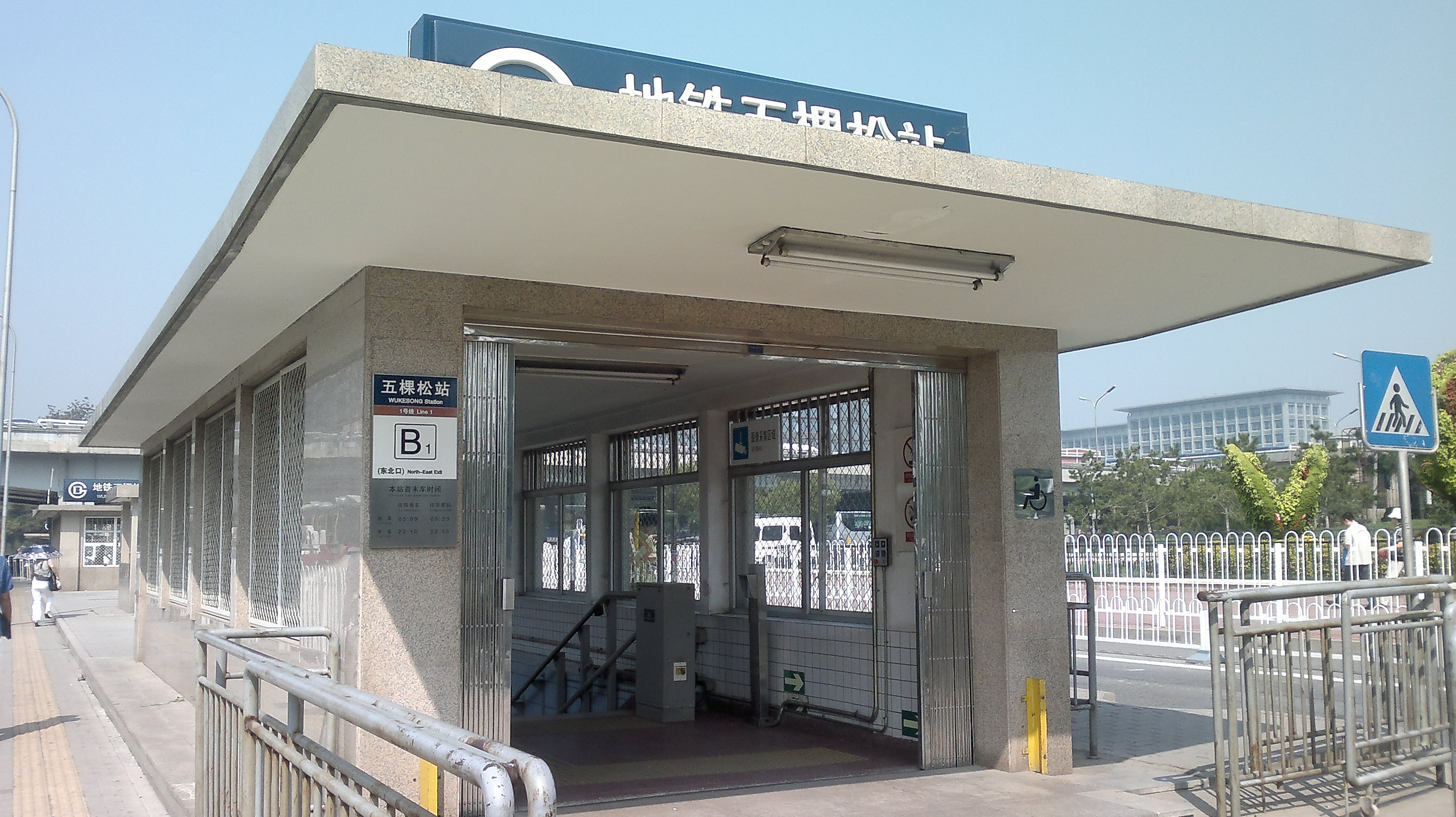
Entrance to the Wukesong station on Line 1

Initially, the subway hosted guest visits. On November 11, 1969, an electrical fire killed three people, injured over 100 and destroyed two cars. Premier Zhou Enlai placed the subway under the control of the People's Liberation Army in early 1970, but reliability problems persisted.

On January 15, 1971, the initial line began operation on a trial basis between the Beijing railway station and Gongzhufen. Single ride fare was set at ¥0.10 and only members of the public with credential letters from their work units could purchase tickets. The line was 10.7 km (6.6 mi) in length, had 10 stations and operated more than 60 train trips per day with a minimum wait time of 14 minutes. On August 15, the initial line was extended to Yuquan Lu and had 13 stations over 15.6 km (9.7 mi). On November 7, the line was extended again, to Gucheng Lu, and had 16 stations over 22.87 km (14.21 mi). The number of trains per day rose to 100. Overall, the line delivered 8.28 million rides in 1971, averaging 28,000 riders per day.

From 1971 to 1975, the subway was shut down for 398 days for political reasons. (Note: From August 12, 1973, to June 30, 1974, and in January 1975, the subway was closed due to defense mobilization. It was closed from September 13 to November 6, 1971, in the aftermath of the Lin Biao incident and on September 18, 1976, after the death of Chairman Mao.) On December 27, 1972, riders no longer needed to present credential letters to purchase tickets. In 1972, the subway delivered 15 million rides and averaged 41,000 riders per day. In 1973, the line was extended to Pingguoyuan and reached 23.6 km (14.7 mi) in length with 17 stations and 132 train trips per day. The line delivered 11 million rides in 1973, averaging 54,000 riders per day.

Despite its return to civilian control in 1976, the subway remained prone to closures due to fires, flooding, and accidents. Annual ridership grew from 22.2 million in 1976 and 28.4 million in 1977 to 30.9 million in 1978, and 55.2 million in 1980.

=== 1981–2000: two lines for two decades ===
On April 20, 1981, the Beijing Subway Company, then a subsidiary of the Beijing Public Transportation Company, was organized to take over subway operations. On September 15, 1981, the initial line passed its final inspections, and was handed over to the Beijing Subway Company, ending a decade of trial operations. It had 19 stations and ran 27.6 kilometres (17.1 miles) from Fushouling in the Western Hills to the Beijing railway station. Investment in the project totaled ¥706 million. Annual ridership rose from 64.7 million in 1981 and 72.5 million in 1982 to 82 million in 1983.

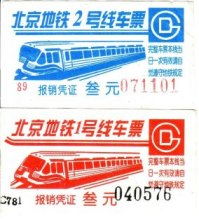
Paper tickets for Lines 1 & 2

On September 20, 1984, a second line was opened to the public. This horseshoe-shaped line was created from the eastern half of the initial line and corresponds to the southern half of the present-day Line 2. It ran 16.1 km (10.0 mi) from Fuxingmen to Jianguomen with 16 stations. Ridership reached 105 million in 1985.

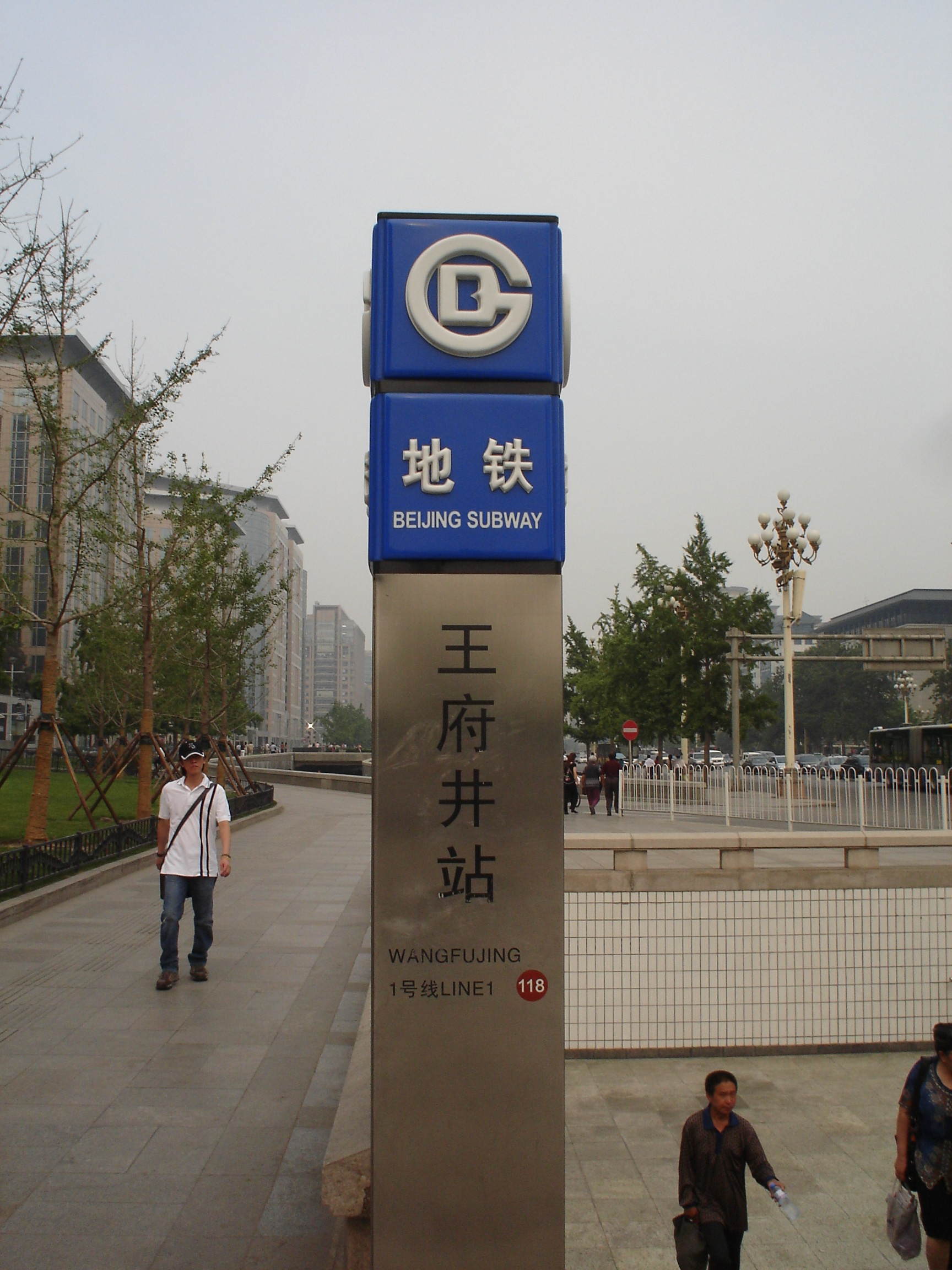
Entrance to the Wangfujing Station on Line 1. The Wangfujing station opened in 1999 as part of Line 1's eastward extension from Fuxingmen.

On December 28, 1987, the two existing lines were reconfigured into Lines 1, which ran from Pingguoyuan to Fuxingmen and Line 2, in its current loop, tracing the Ming city wall. Fares doubled to ¥0.20 for single-line rides and ¥0.30 for rides with transfers. Ridership reached 307 million in 1988. The subway was closed from June 3–4, 1989 during the suppression of the Tiananmen Square demonstrations. In 1990, the subway carried more than one million riders per day for the first time, as total ridership reached 381 million. After a fare hike to ¥0.50 in 1991, annual ridership declined slightly to 371 million.

On January 26, 1991, planning began on the eastward extension of Line 1 under Chang'an Avenue from Fuxingmen. The project was funded by a 19.2 billion yen low-interest development assistance loan from Japan. Construction began on the eastern extension on June 24, 1992, and the Xidan station opened on December 12, 1992. The remaining extension to Sihuidong was completed on September 28, 1999. National leaders Wen Jiabao, Jia Qinglin, Yu Zhengsheng and mayor Liu Qi were on hand to mark the occasion. The full-length of Line 1 became operational on June 28, 2000.

Despite little track expansion in the early 1990s, ridership grew rapidly to reach a record high of 558 million in 1995, but fell to 444 million the next year when fares rose from ¥0.50 to ¥2.00. After fares rose again to ¥3.00 in 2000, annual ridership fell to 434 million from 481 million in 1999.

=== 2001–2008: planning for the Olympics ===
In the summer of 2001, the city won the bid to host the 2008 Summer Olympics and accelerated plans to expand the subway. From 2002 to 2008, the city planned to invest ¥63.8 billion (US$7.69 billion) in subway projects and build an ambitious subway network. The plan, termed "three ring, four horizontal, five vertical and seven radial" in 2007, consisted of 19 lines:

- Three ring lines: 2, 10 and 13
- Four horizontal lines: 1, 6, 7, 14 (West)
- Five vertical lines: 4, 5, 8, 9, 14 (East)
- Seven radial lines: Batong, Changping, Daxing, Fangshan, Shunyi (Line 15), Yizhuang, Line S1

Work on Line 5 had already begun on September 25, 2000. Land clearing for Lines 4 and 10 began in November 2003 and construction commenced by the end of the year. Most new subway construction projects were funded by loans from the Big Four state banks. Line 4 was funded by the Beijing MTR Corporation, a joint-venture with the Hong Kong MTR. To achieve plans for 19 lines and 561 km (349 mi) by 2015, the city planned to invest a total of ¥200 billion ($29.2 billion).

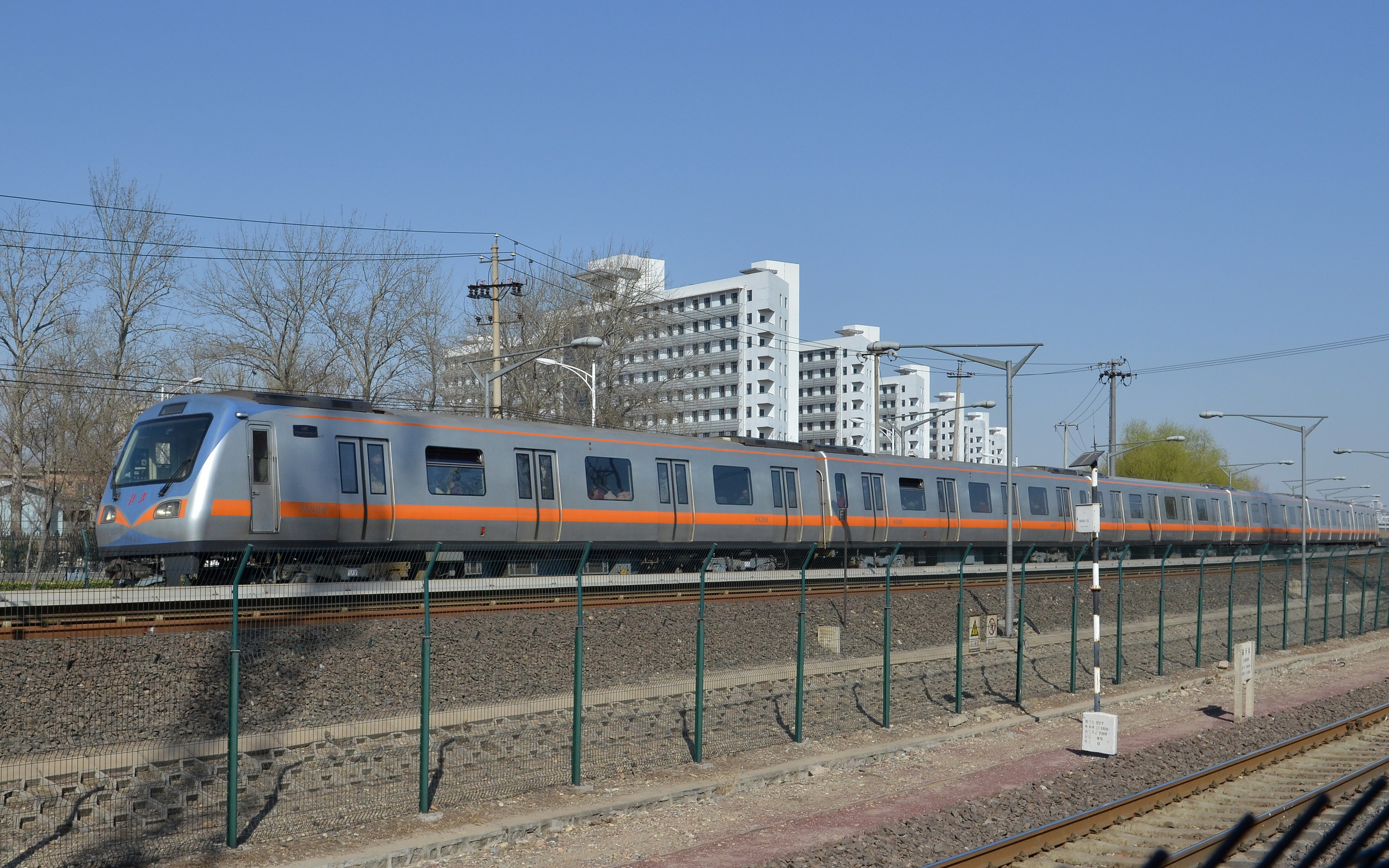
Line 13 train between Wudaokou and Shangdi

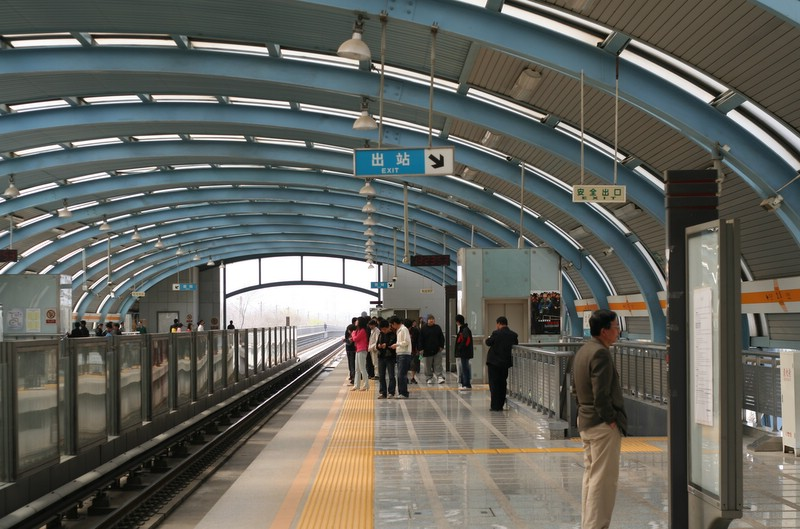
Line 13 station at Longze. Line 13 opened in two parts in 2002 and 2003.

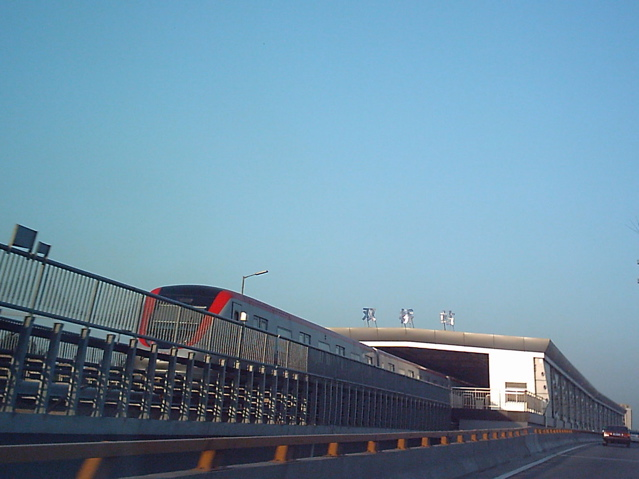
A model SFX01 Batong line train at Shuangqiao. The Batong line opened in Dec. 2003

The next additions to the subway were surface commuter lines that linked to the north and east of the city. Line 13, a half loop that links the northern suburbs, first opened on the western half from Huilongguan to Xizhimen on September 28, 2002 and the entire line became operational on January 28, 2003. Batong line, built as an extension to Line 1 to Tongzhou District, was opened as a separate line on December 27, 2003. Work on these two lines had begun respectively in December 1999 and 2000. Ridership hit 607 million in 2004.

Line 5 came into operation on October 7, 2007. It was the city's first north–south line, extending from Songjiazhuang in the south to Tiantongyuan in the north. On the same day, subway fares were reduced from between ¥3 and ¥7 per trip, depending on the line and number of transfers, to a single flat fare of ¥2 with unlimited transfers. The lower fare policy caused the Beijing Subway to run a deficit of ¥600 million in 2007, which was expected to widen to ¥1 billion in 2008. The Beijing municipal government covered these deficits to encourage mass transit use, and reduce traffic congestion and air pollution. On a total of 655 million rides delivered in 2007, the government's subsidy averaged ¥0.92 per ride.

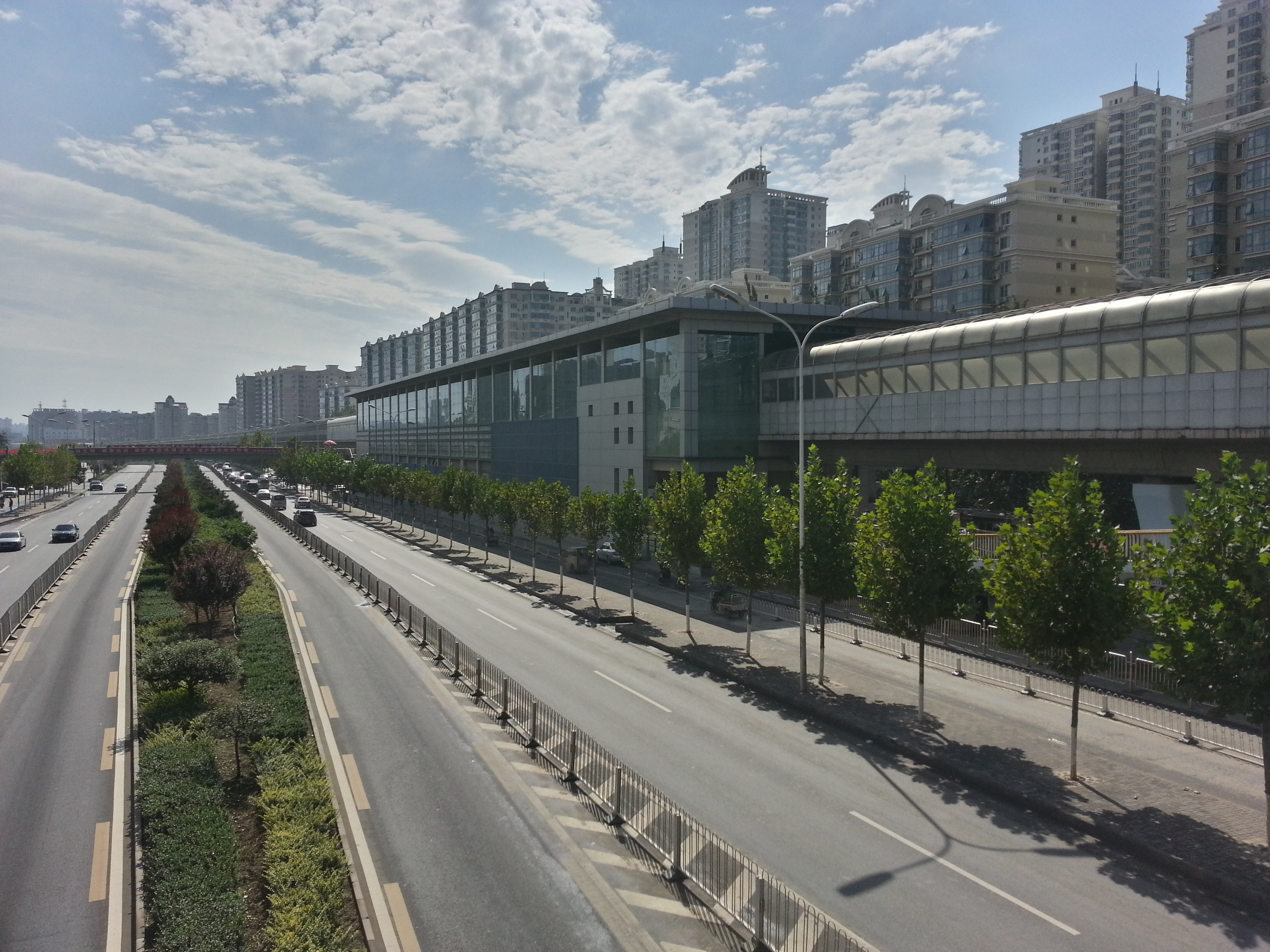
Elevated Line 5 station and platform at Tiantongyuan. Line 5 opened on Oct. 7, 2007.

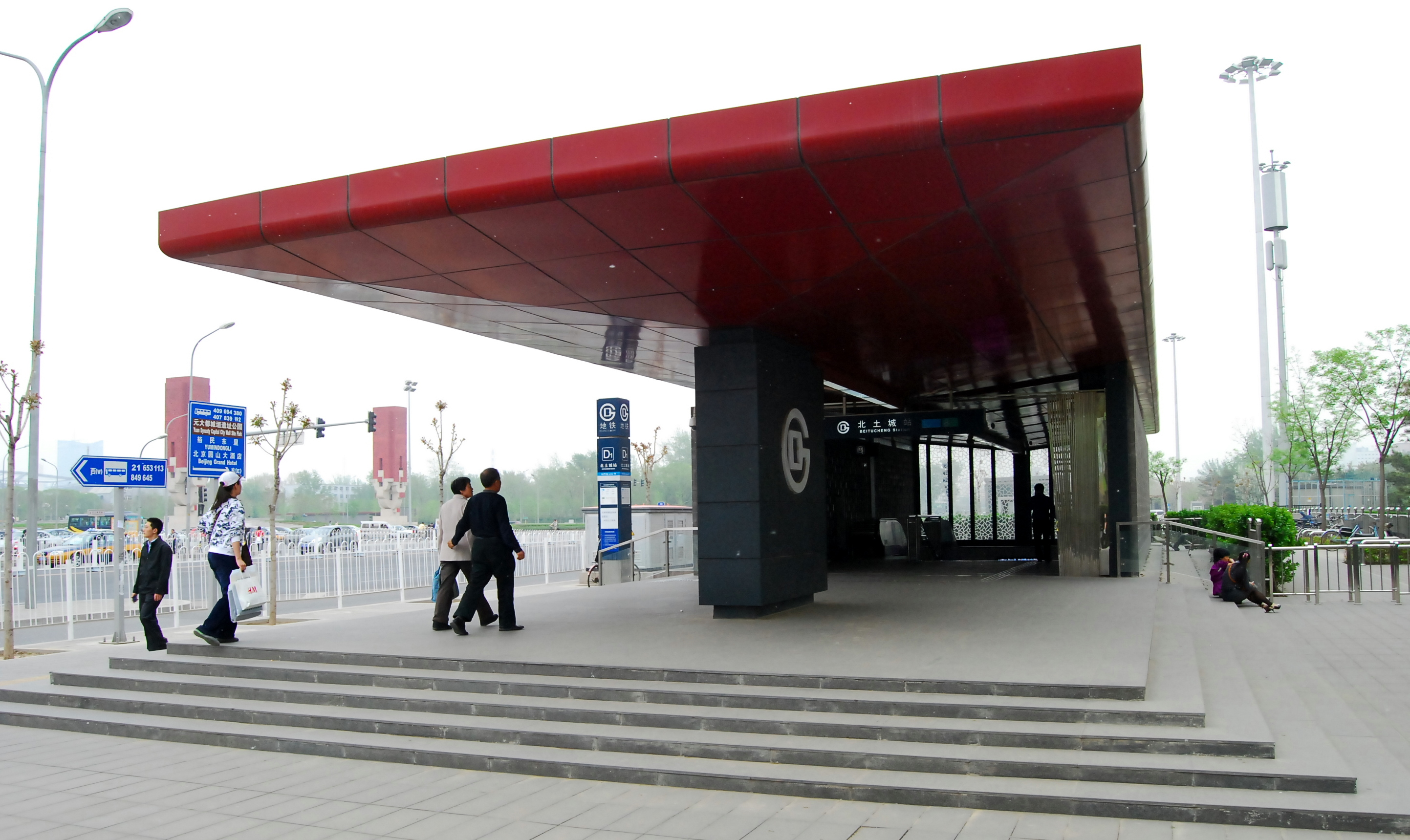
Beitucheng station for Lines 8 and 10, which along with the Capital Airport Express, opened on July 19, 2008.

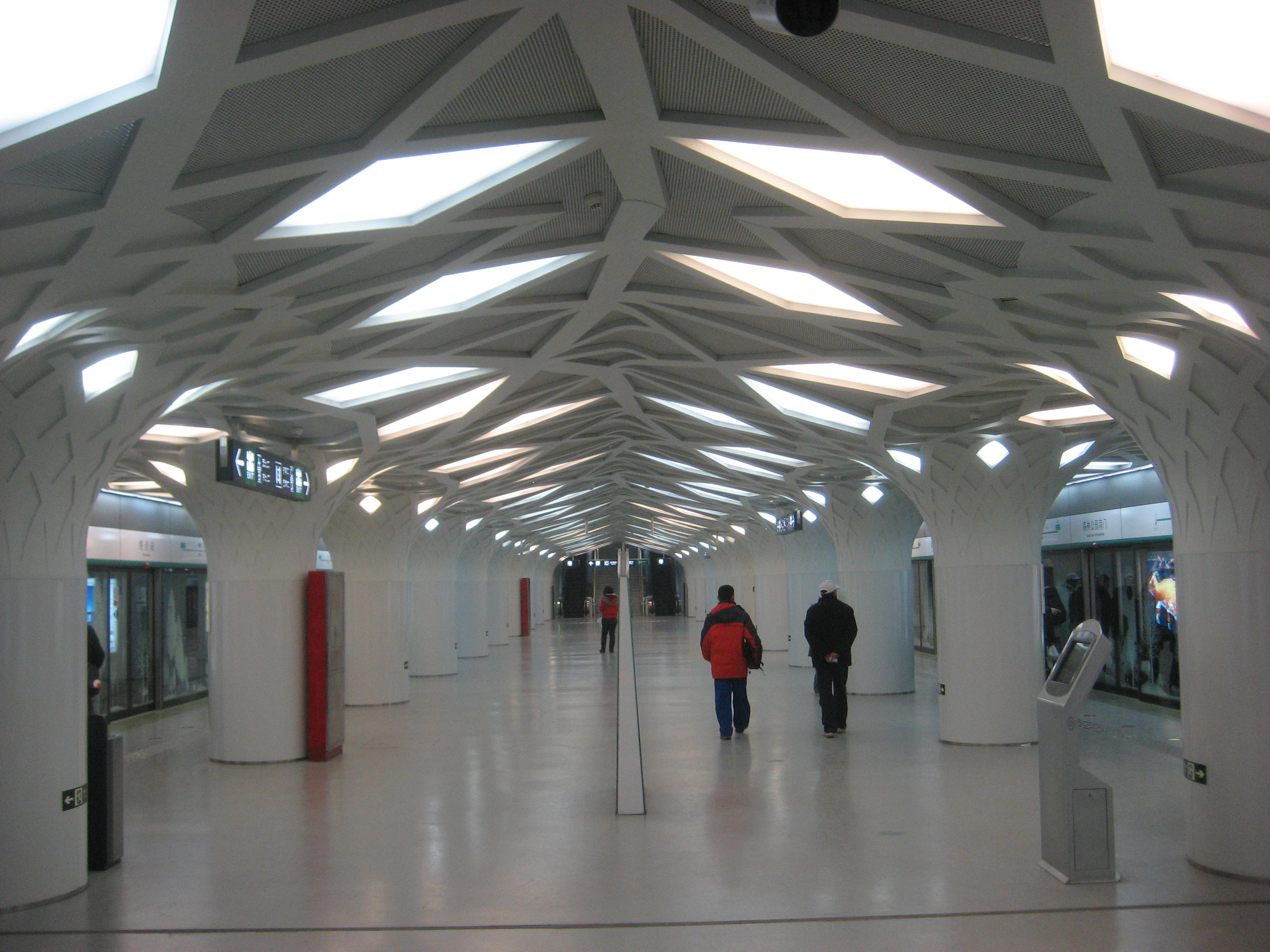
Each of the four original stations on the Olympic Branch Line (Line 8) has a unique interior decor style. (Pictured: Forest Park South Gate)

As part of the urban re-development for the 2008 Olympics, the subway system was significantly expanded.In the summer of 2008, in anticipation of the Summer Olympic Games, three new lines—Line 10 (Phase 1), Line 8 (Phase 1) and the Capital Airport Express—opened on July 19. The use of paper tickets, hand checked by clerks for 38 years, was discontinued and replaced by electronic tickets that are scanned by automatic fare collection machines upon entry and exit of the subway. Stations are outfitted with touch screen vending machines that sell single-ride tickets and multiple-ride Yikatong fare cards. The subway operated throughout the night from August 8–9, 2008 to accommodate the Opening Ceremonies of the Olympic Games, and is extending evening operations of all lines by one to three hours (to 1-2 a.m.) through the duration of the Games. The subway set a daily ridership record of 4.92 million on August 22, 2008, the day of the Games' closing ceremony. In 2008, total ridership rose by 75% to 1.2 billion.

=== 2008–2015: rapid expansion ===
After the Chinese government announced a ¥4 trillion economic stimulus package in November 2008, the Beijing urban planning commission further expedited subway building plans, especially for elevated lines to suburban districts that are cheaper to build. In December 2008, the commission moved completion dates of the Yizhuang and Daxing Lines to 2010 from 2012, finalized the route of the Fangshan Line, and unveiled the Changping and Xijiao Lines.

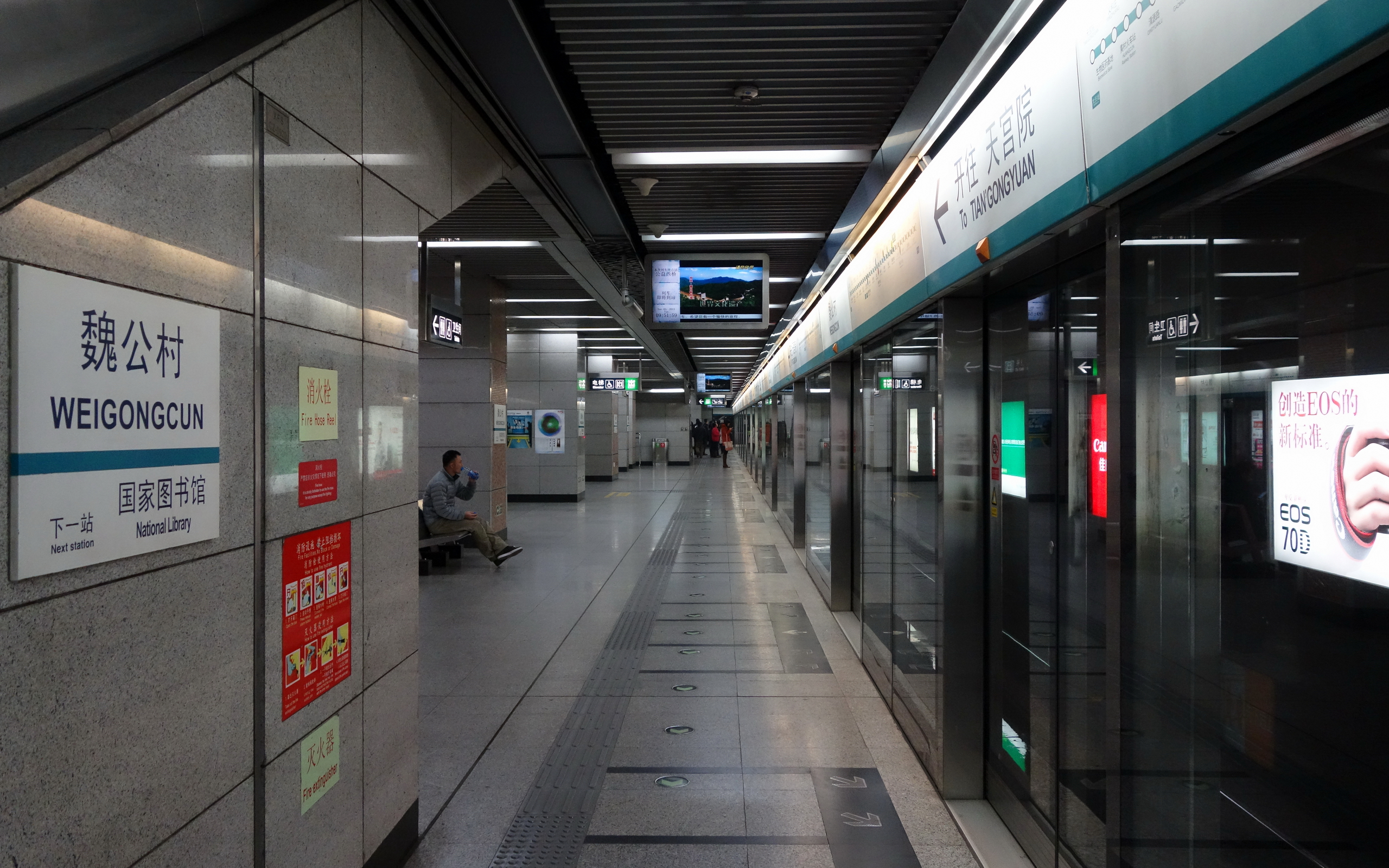
All stations built since 2007 have platform doors, including the Weigongcun station on Line 4, which opened September 28, 2009.

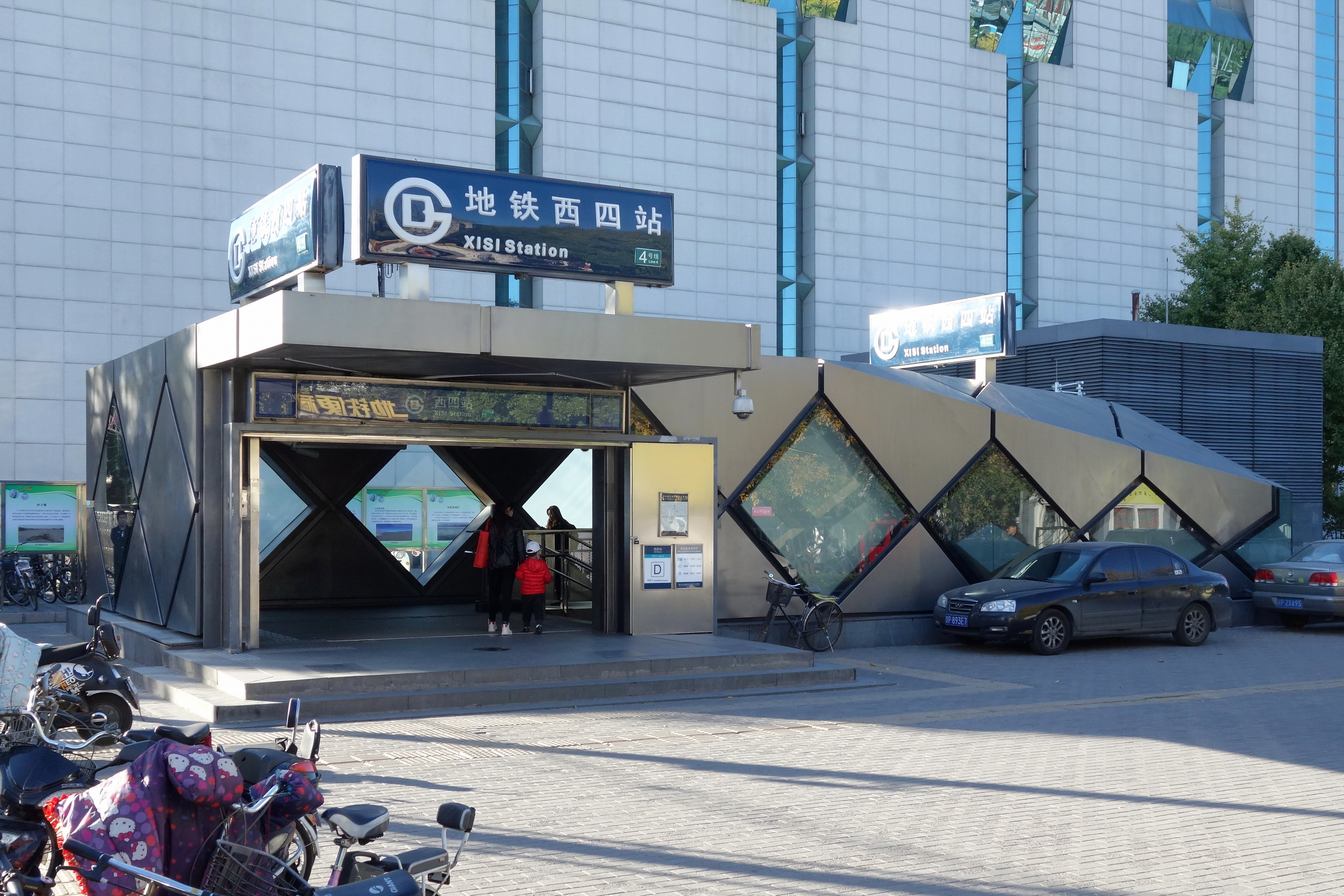
Entrance D to Xisi station on Line 4. Each station entrance has an entrance label

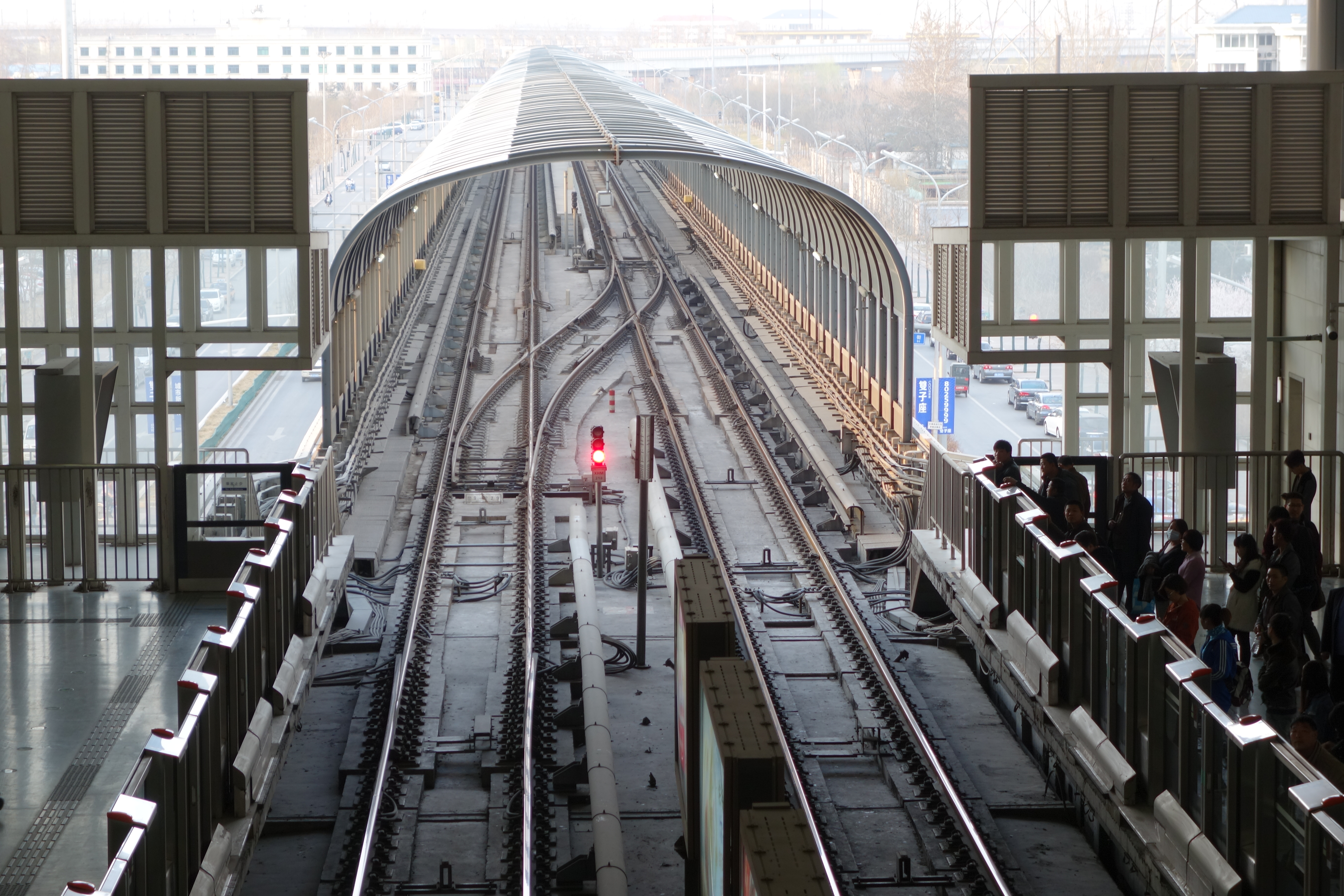
Tracks north of Xihongmen Station on the Daxing Line

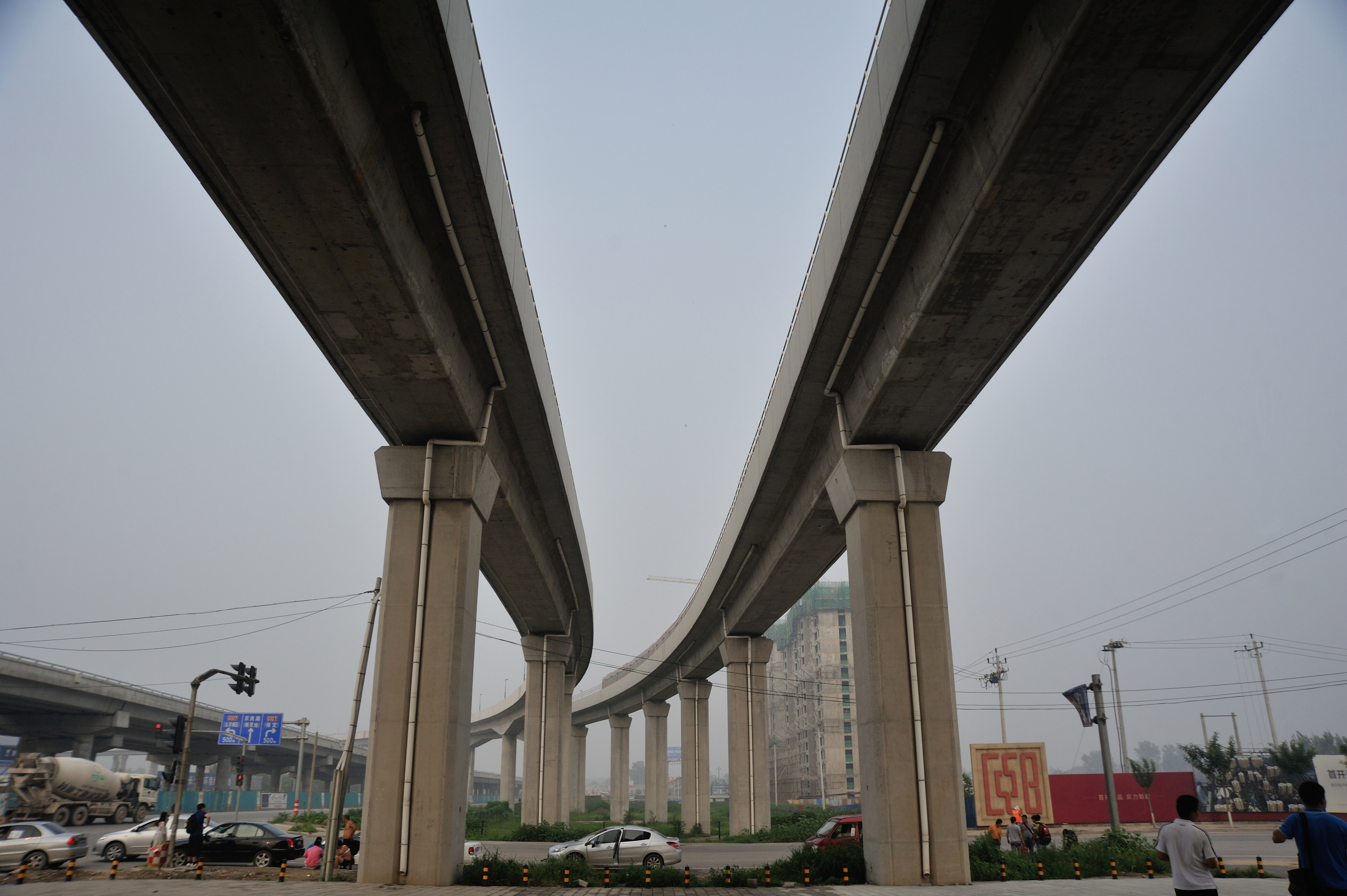
Elevated viaduct on the Fangshan Line

Line 4 started operation on September 28, 2009, bringing subway service to much of western Beijing. It is managed by the MTR Corporation through a joint venture with the city. In 2009, the subway delivered 1.457 billion rides, 19.24% of mass transit trips in Beijing.

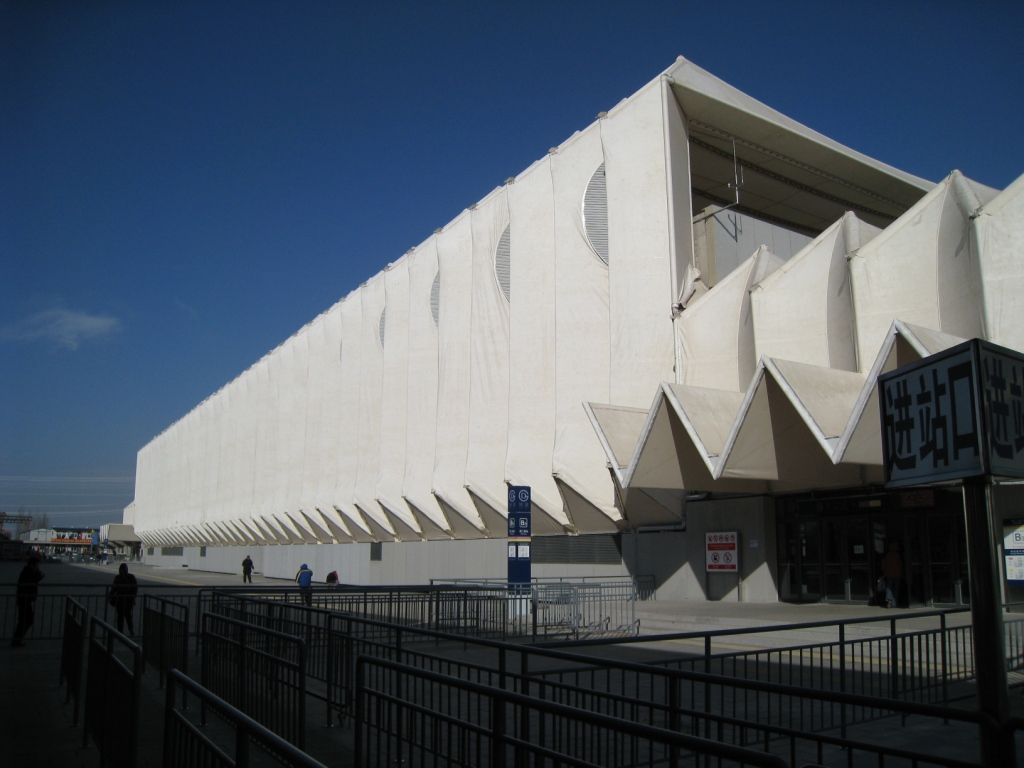
The Xi'erqi interchange for Lines 13 and Changping

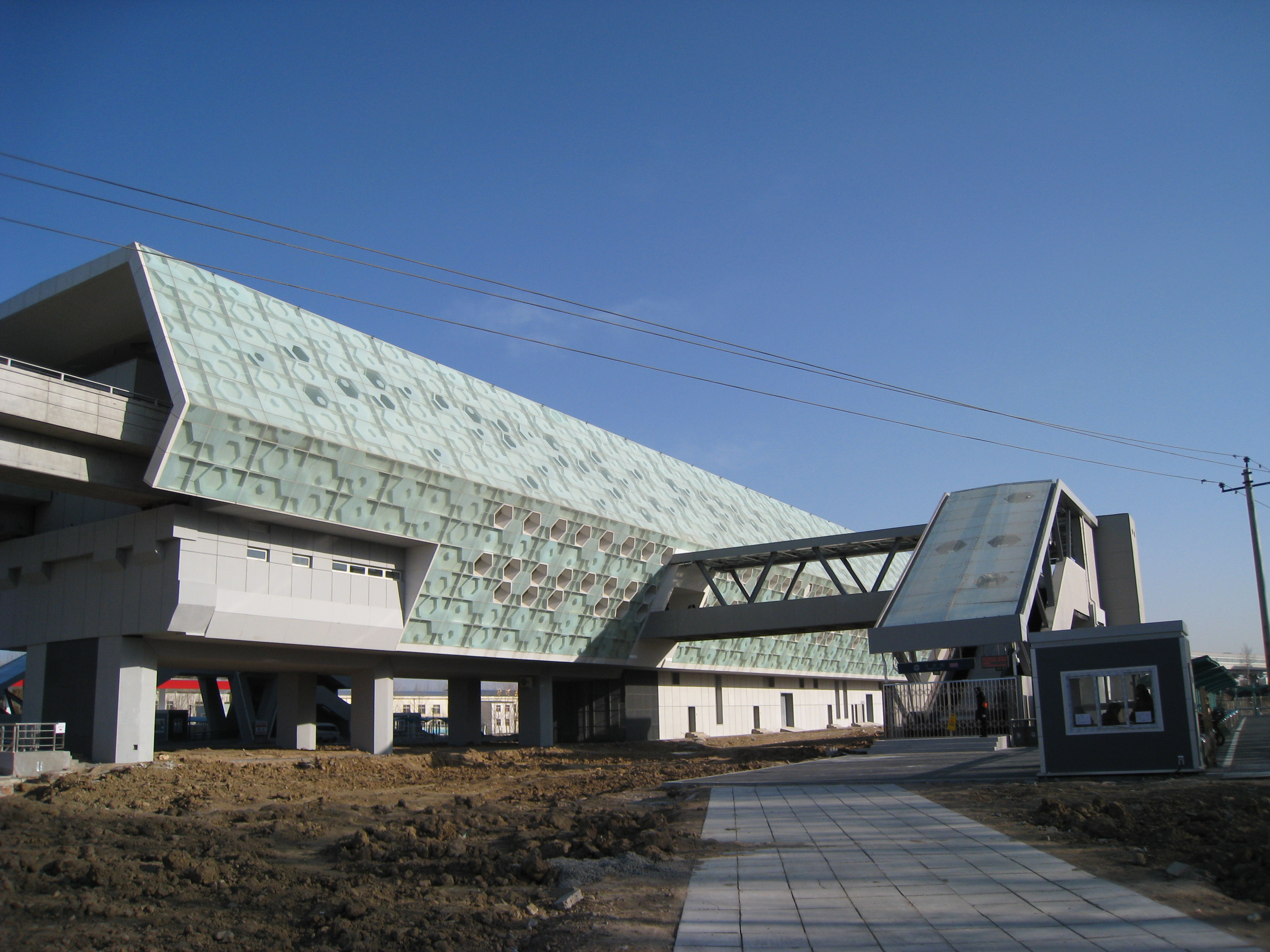
Shahe station on the Changping line

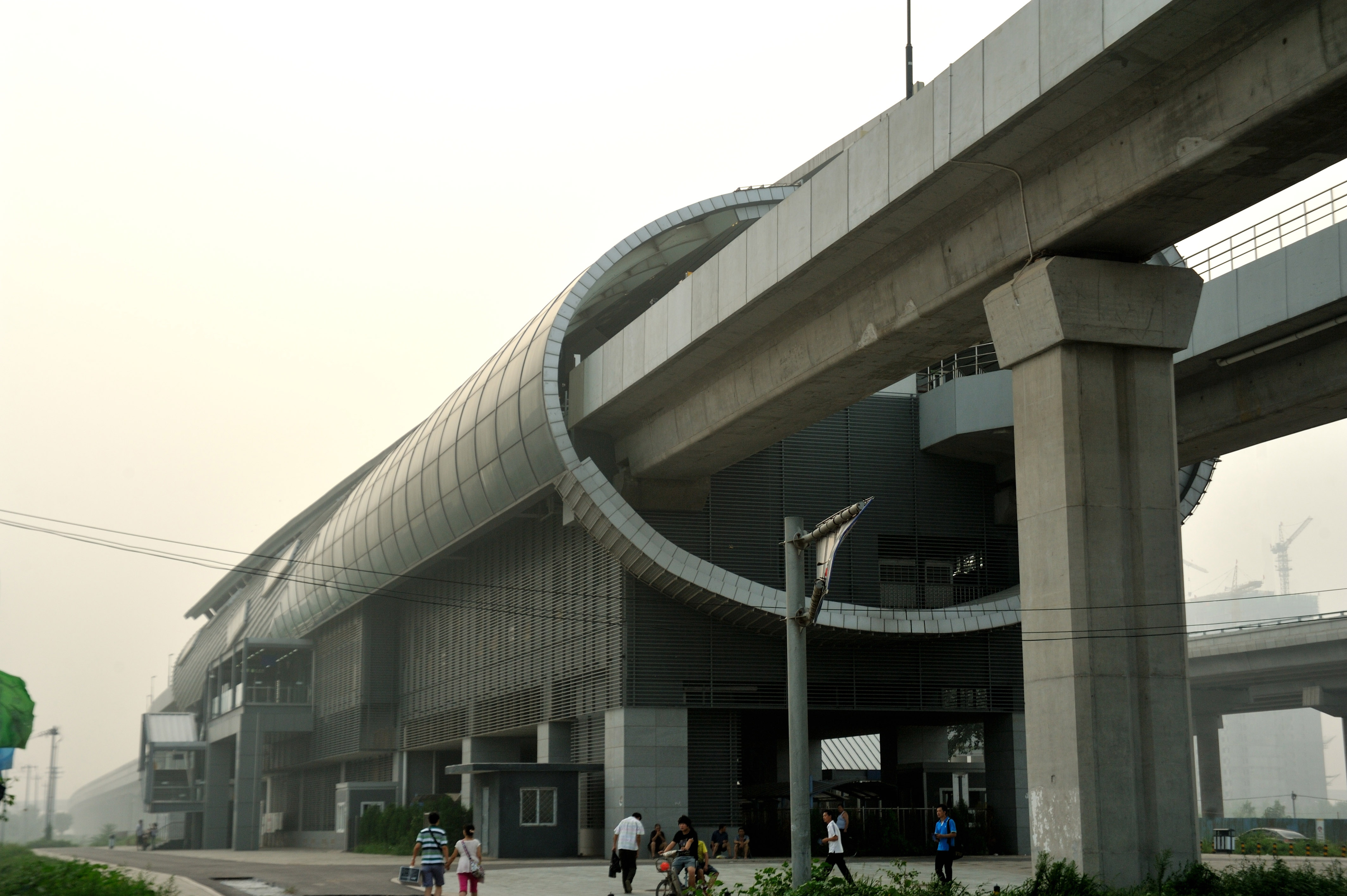
Changyang station on the Fangshan line

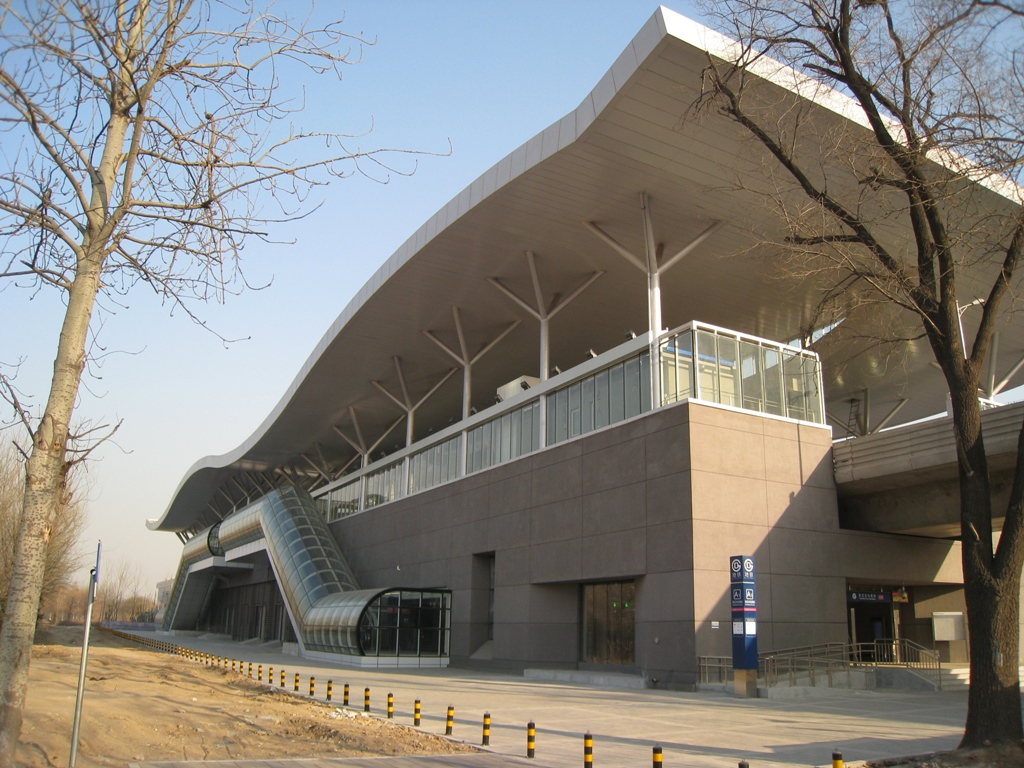
Yizhuang Culture Park station on the Yizhuang Line
On December 30, 2010, Lines 15, Changping, Fangshan, Yizhuang and Daxing, all suburban lines, commenced operation.

In 2010, Beijing's worsening traffic congestion prompted city planners to move the construction of several lines from the 13th Five Year Plan to the 12th Five Year Plan. This meant Lines 8 (Phase III), Line 3, Line 12, Line 16, the Yanfang line, as well as additional lines to Changping District and Tiantongyuan were to begin construction before 2015. Previously, Lines 3, 12 and 16 were being planned for the more distant future. On December 30, 2010, five suburban lines: Lines 15 (Phase I from Wangjingxi to Houshayu except Wangjing East station), Changping, Fangshan (except Guogongzhuang station), Yizhuang (except Yizhuang railway station), and Daxing, commenced operation. The addition of 108 km (67 mi) of track, a nearly 50% increase, made the subway the fourth longest metro in the world. One year later, on December 31, 2011, the subway surpassed the New York City Subway to become the third longest metro in revenue track length with the extension of Line 8 north from the Forest Park South Gate to Huilongguan Dongdajie, the opening of Line 9 in southwest Beijing from Beijing West railway station to Guogongzhuang (except Fengtai Dongdajie, which opened on October 12, 2012), the extension of the Fangshan Line to Guogongzhuang, and the extension of Line 15 from Houshayu to Fengbo in central Shunyi. In the same year, the Beijing government unveiled an ambitious expansion plan envisioning the subway network to reach a track density of 0.51 km per km^{2} (0.82 mi per sq. mi.) inside the Fifth Ring Road where residents would on average have to walk 1 km (0.62 mi) to the nearest subway station. Ridership reached 2.18 billion in 2011.

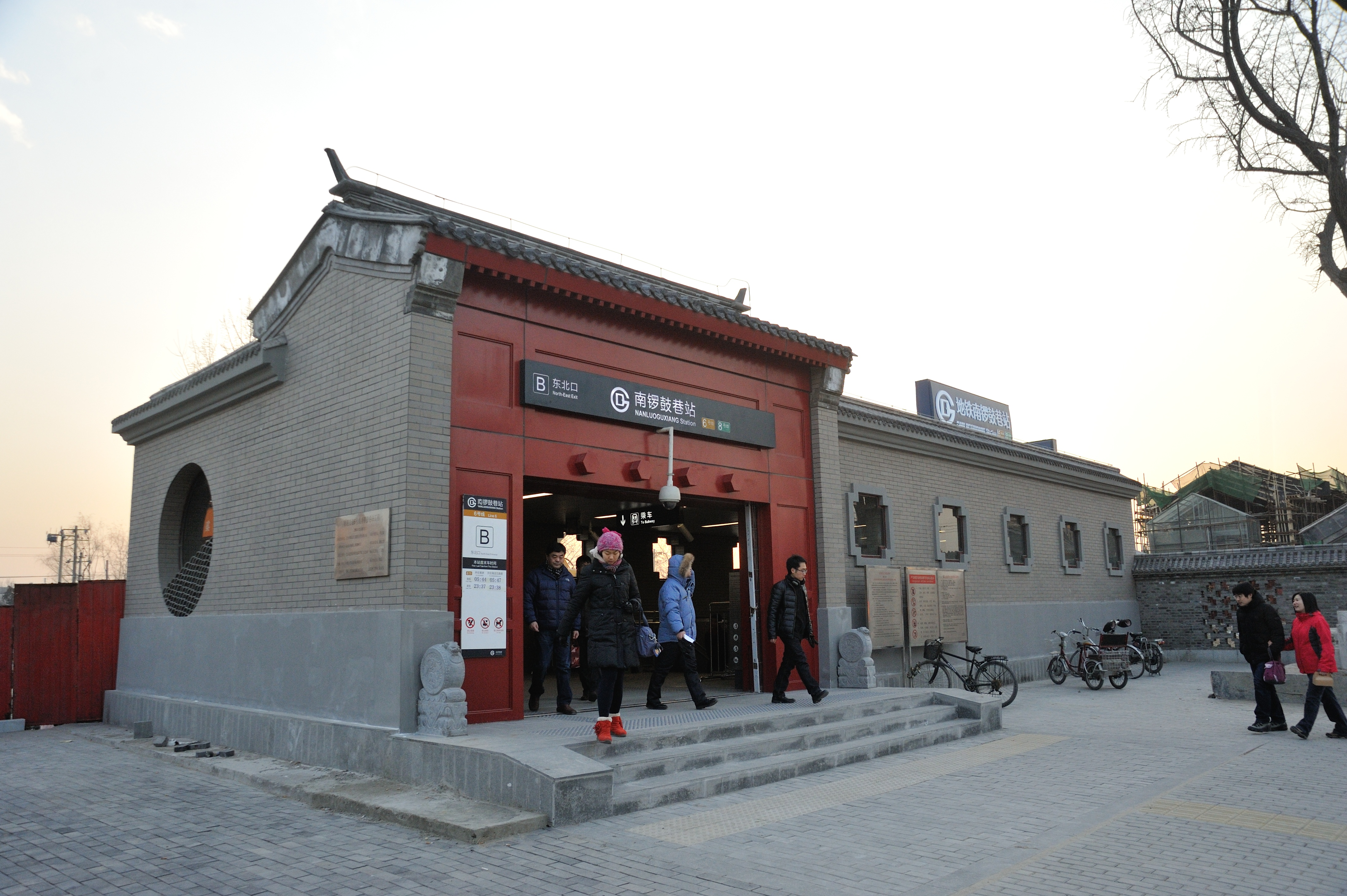
Nanluoguxiang station on Line 6 blends into the traditional courtyard neighborhood of central Beijing.

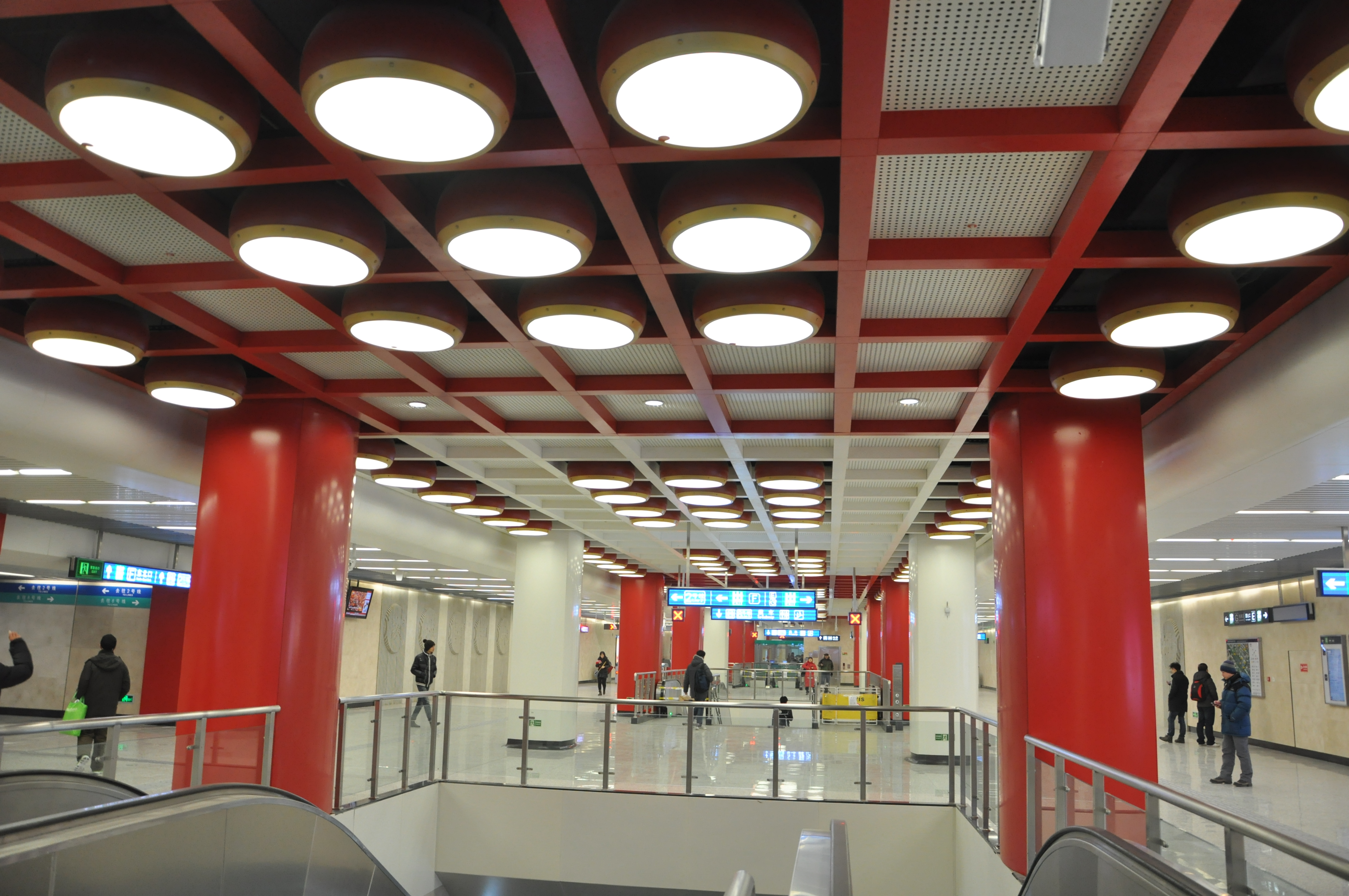
Line 8's concourse in Guloudajie station with drum-shaped lights inspired by nearby Drum Tower.

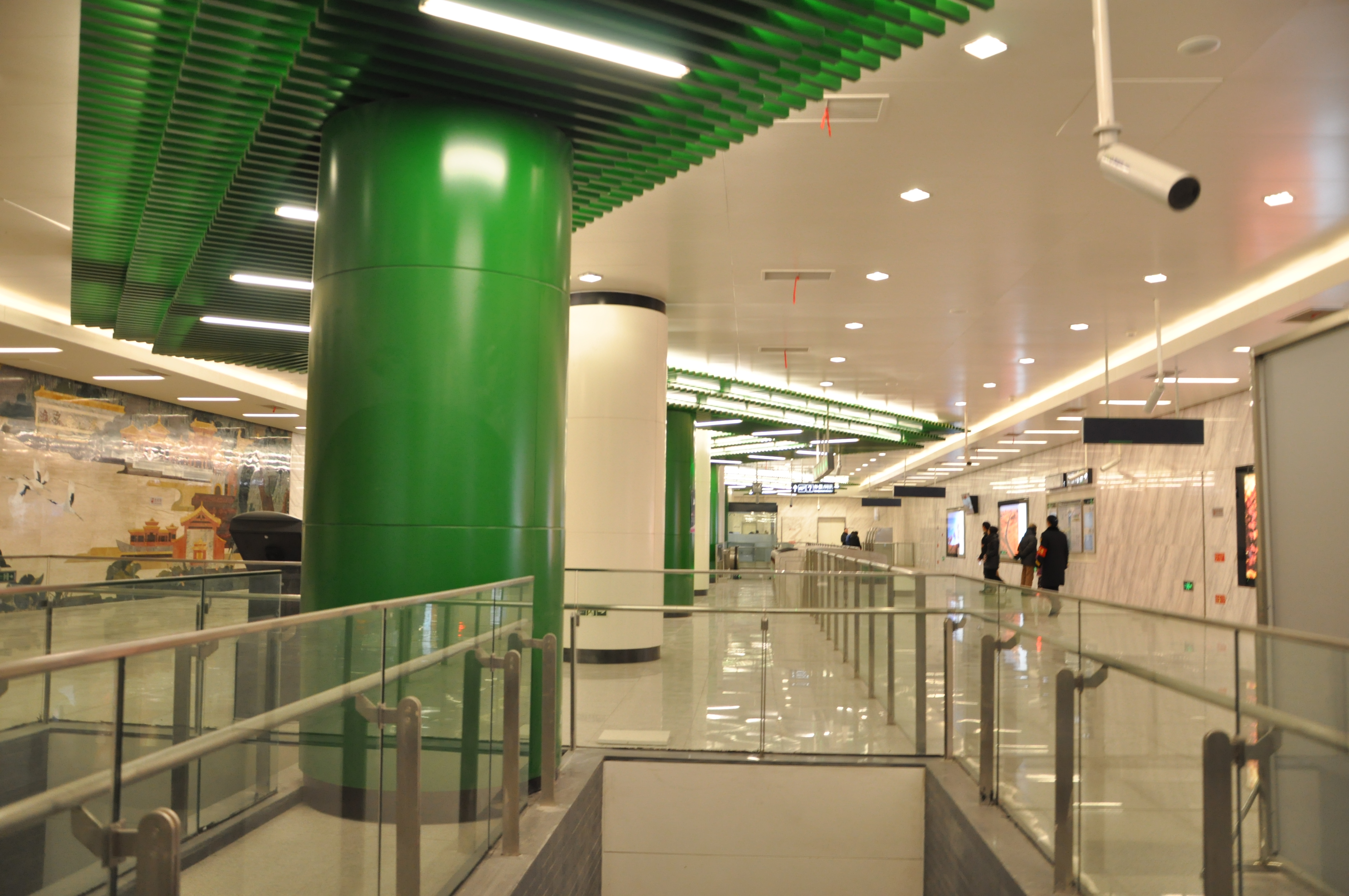
Interior décor of Beihai North station evokes the white stupa of Beihai Park.

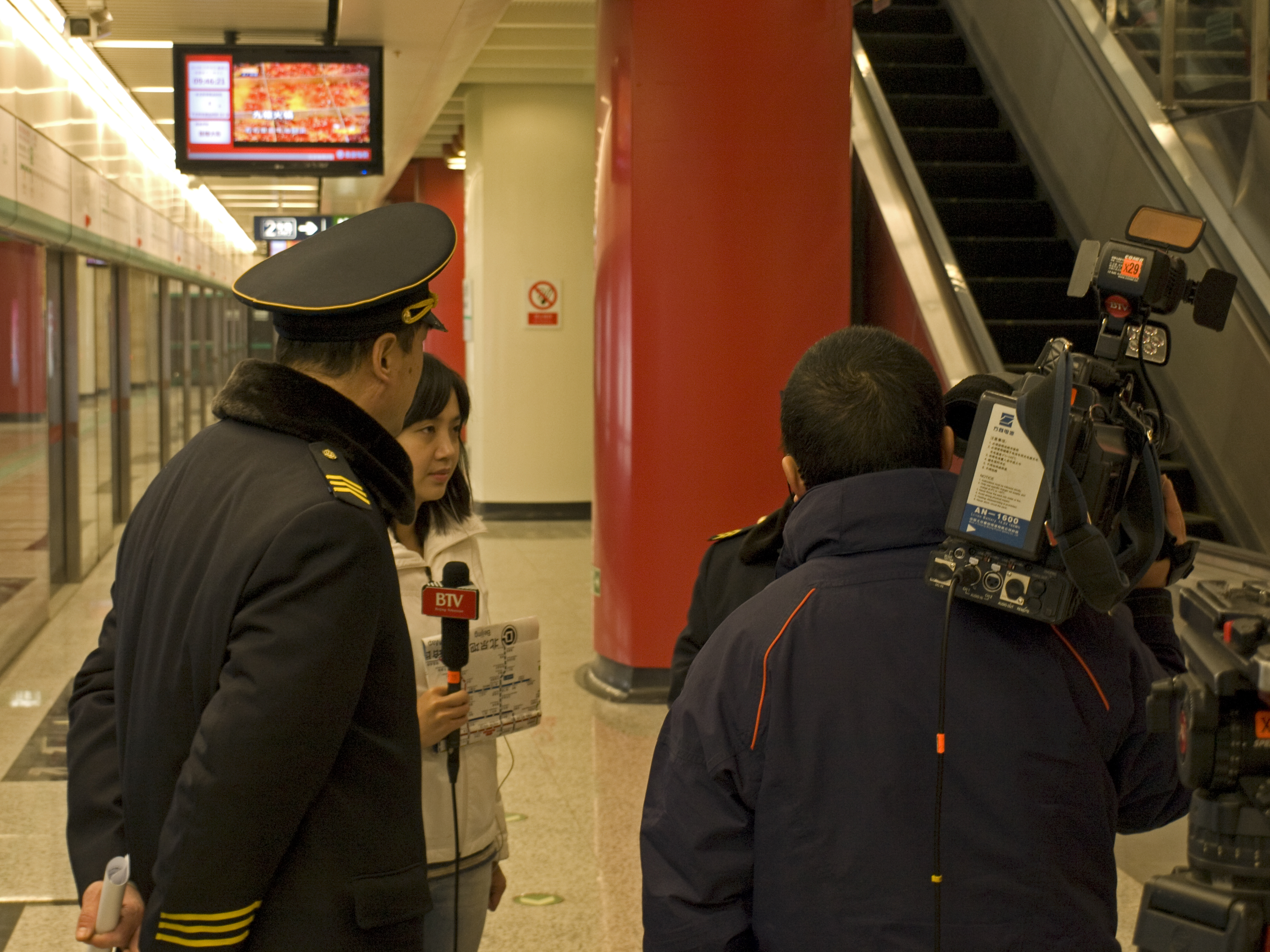
Beijing Television interviewed subway officials on December 30, 2012, when over 40 new stations were opened, and the subway temporarily surpassed the Shanghai Metro to be the longest in the world, only to be surpassed by Shanghai again a year later.

In February 2012, the city government confirmed that Lines Line 3, Line 12, Line 17, and Line 19 were under planning as part of Phase II expansion. Retroactively implying that the original three ring, four horizontal, five vertical and seven radial plan was part of Phase I expansion. Line 17 was planned to run north–south, parallel and to the east of Line 5, from Future Science Park North to Yizhuang Zhanqianqu South. Line 19 was planned to run north–south, from Mudanyuan to Xingong.

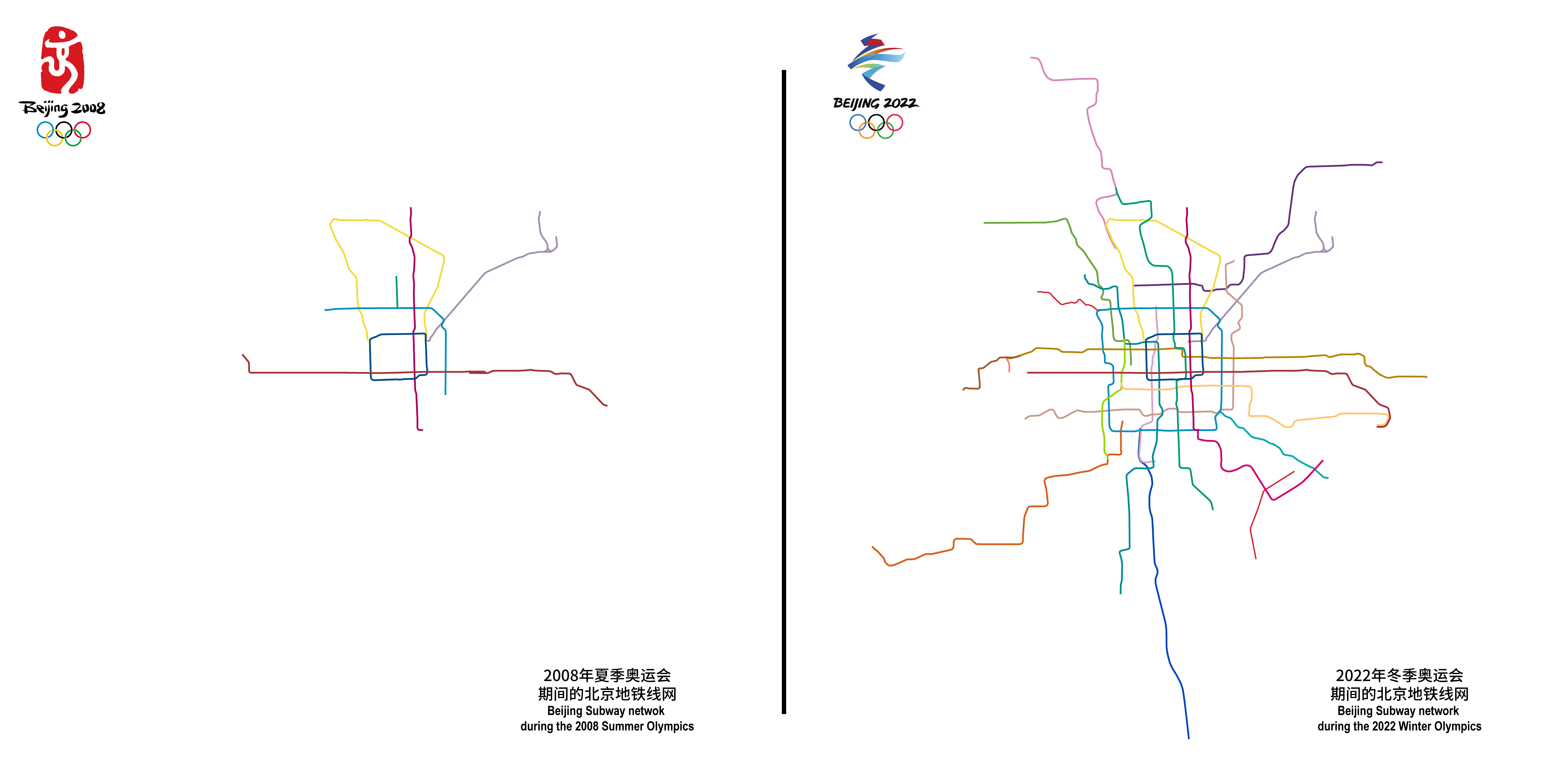
Beijing Subway network during the 2008 Summer and 2022 Winter Olympic Games

On December 30, 2012, Line 6 (Phase I from Haidian Wuluju to Caofang), the extension of Line 8 from Beitucheng south to Gulou Dajie (except Andeli Beijie), the remainder of Line 9 (except Military Museum station) and the remainder of the Line 10 loop (except the Xiju-Shoujingmao section and Jiaomen East station) entered service. The addition of 69.8 km (43 mi) of track increased the network length to 442 km (275 mi) and allowed the subway to overtake the Shanghai Metro, for several months, as the world's longest metro. The subway delivered 2.46 billion rides in 2012.

On May 5, 2013, the Line 10 loop was completed with the opening of the Xiju-Shoujingmao section and the Jiaomen East Station. The 57 km (35 mi) loop line became the longest underground subway loop in the world. On the same day, the first section of Line 14 from Zhangguozhuang to Xiju also entered operation, ahead of the opening of the Ninth China International Garden Expo in Fengtai District. The subway's total length reached 456 km (283 mi). On December 28, 2013, two sections were added to Line 8, which extended the line north to Zhuxinzhuang and south to Nanluoguxiang. In 2013, the subway delivered 3.209 billion rides, an increase of 30% from the year before.

On December 28, 2014, the subway network expanded by 62.2 km (38.6 mi) to 18 lines and 527 km (327 mi) with the opening of Line 7, the eastern extension of line 6 (from Caofang to Lucheng), the eastern section of line 14 (from Jintai Lu to Shangezhuang), and the western extension of line 15 (from Wangjingxi to Qinghua Donglu Xikou). At the same time, the ¥2 flat-rate fare was replaced with a variable-rate fare (a minimum of ¥3), to cover operation costs. In 2014, the subway delivered 3.387 billion rides, an increase of 5.68% from the year before. Average daily and weekday ridership also set new highs of 9.2786 million and 10.0876 million, respectively.

From 2007 to 2014, the cost of subway construction in Beijing rose sharply from ¥0.571 billion per km to ¥1.007 billion per km. The cost includes land acquisition, compensation to relocate residents and firms, actual construction costs and equipment purchase. In 2014, city budgeted ¥15.5 billion for subway construction, and the remainder of subway building costs was financed by the Beijing Infrastructure Investment Co. LTD, a city-owned investment firm.

In 2014, Beijing planning authorities assessed mass transit monorail lines for areas of the city in which subway construction or operation is difficult. Straddle beam monorail trains have lower transport capacity and operating speed (60 km/h or 37 mph) than conventional subways, but are quieter to operate, have smaller turning radius and better climbing capability, and cost only one-third to one-half of subways to build. According to the initial environmental assessment report by the Chinese Academy of Rail Sciences, the Yuquanlu Line was planned to have 21 stations over 25 km (16 mi) in western Beijing. The line was to begin construction in 2014 and would take two years to complete. The Dongsihuan Line (named for the Eastern Fourth Ring Road it was to follow) was planned to have 21 stations over 33.7 km (20.9 mi).

In early 2015, plans for both monorail lines were shelved indefinitely, due to low capacity and resident opposition. The Yuquanlu Line remains on the city's future transportation plan, and it will be built as a conventional underground subway line. The Dongsihuan Line was replaced by the East extension of Line 7.

On December 26, 2015, the subway network expanded to 554 km (344 mi) with the opening of the section of Line 14 from Beijing South railway station to Jintai Lu (11 stations; 16.6 km (10.3 mi)), Phase II of the Changping line from Nanshao to Changping Xishankou (5 stations; 10.6 km or 6.6 mi), Andelibeijie station on Line 8, and Datunlu East station on Line 15. Ridership in 2015 fell by 4% to 3.25 billion due to a fare increase from a flat fare back to a distance based fare.

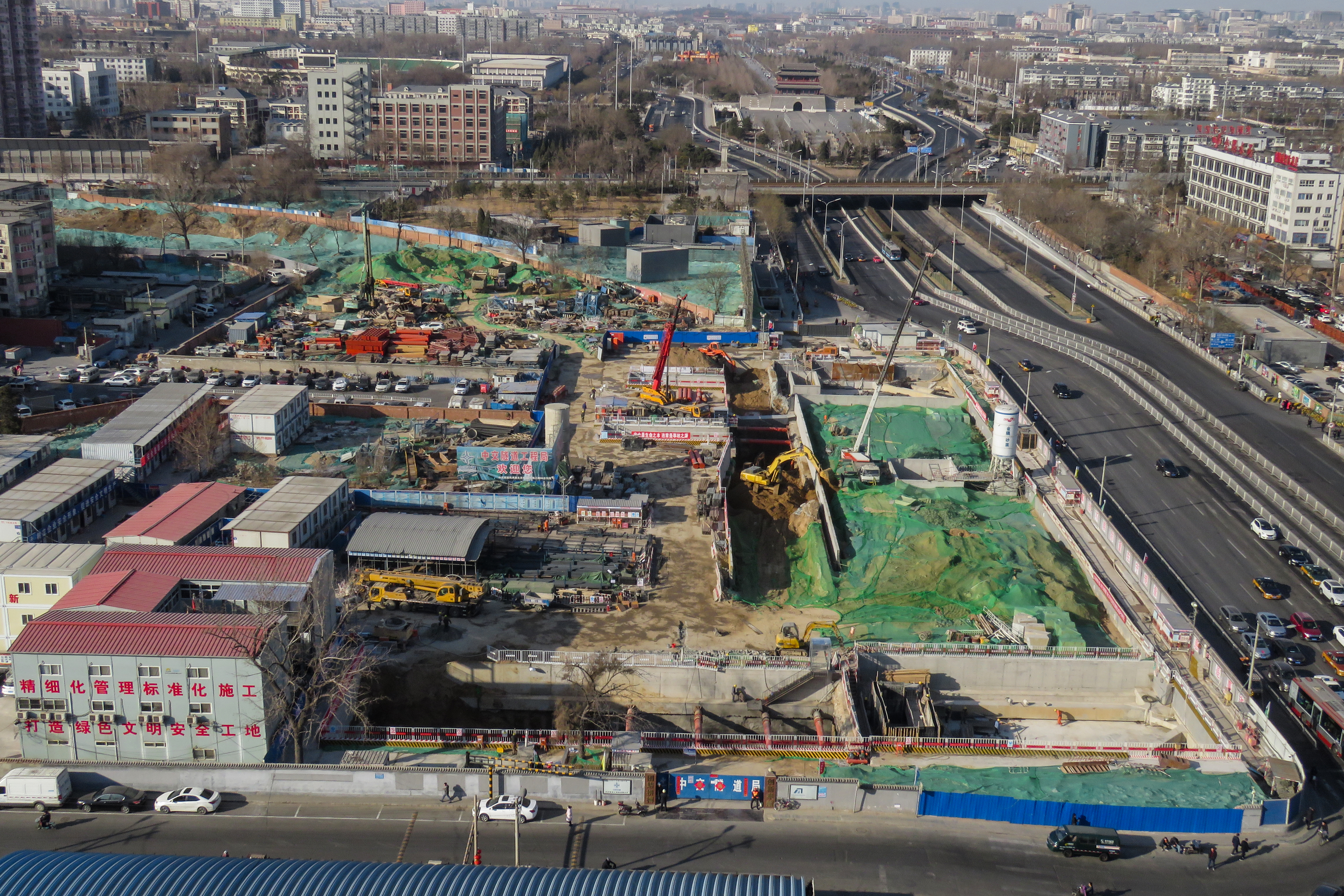
Line 8 construction site at Yongdingmenwai in March 2018, next to Beijing's central north-south axis.

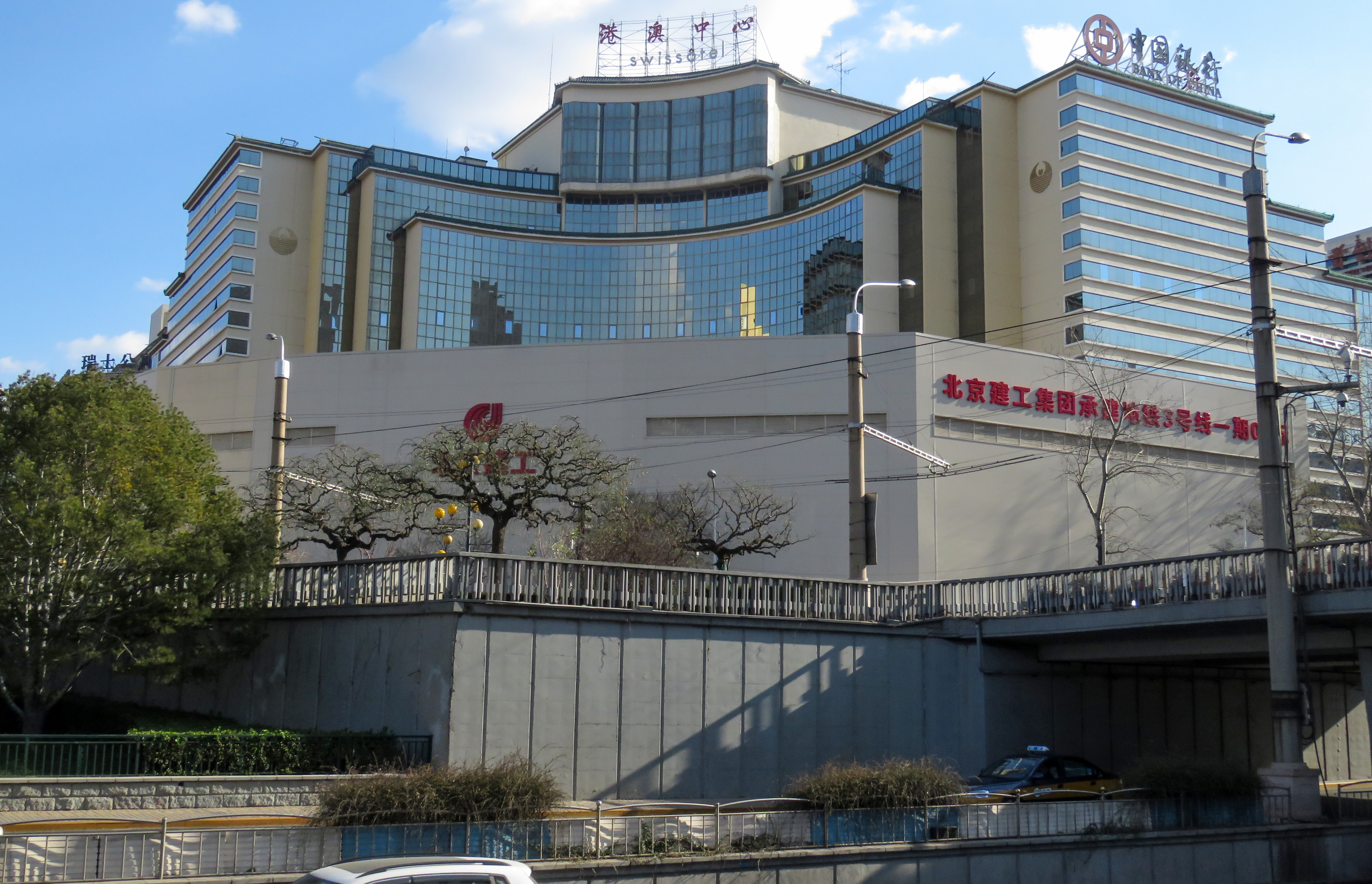
Enclosed construction site of Line 3 at Dongsishitiao along the 2nd Ring Road in December 2017.

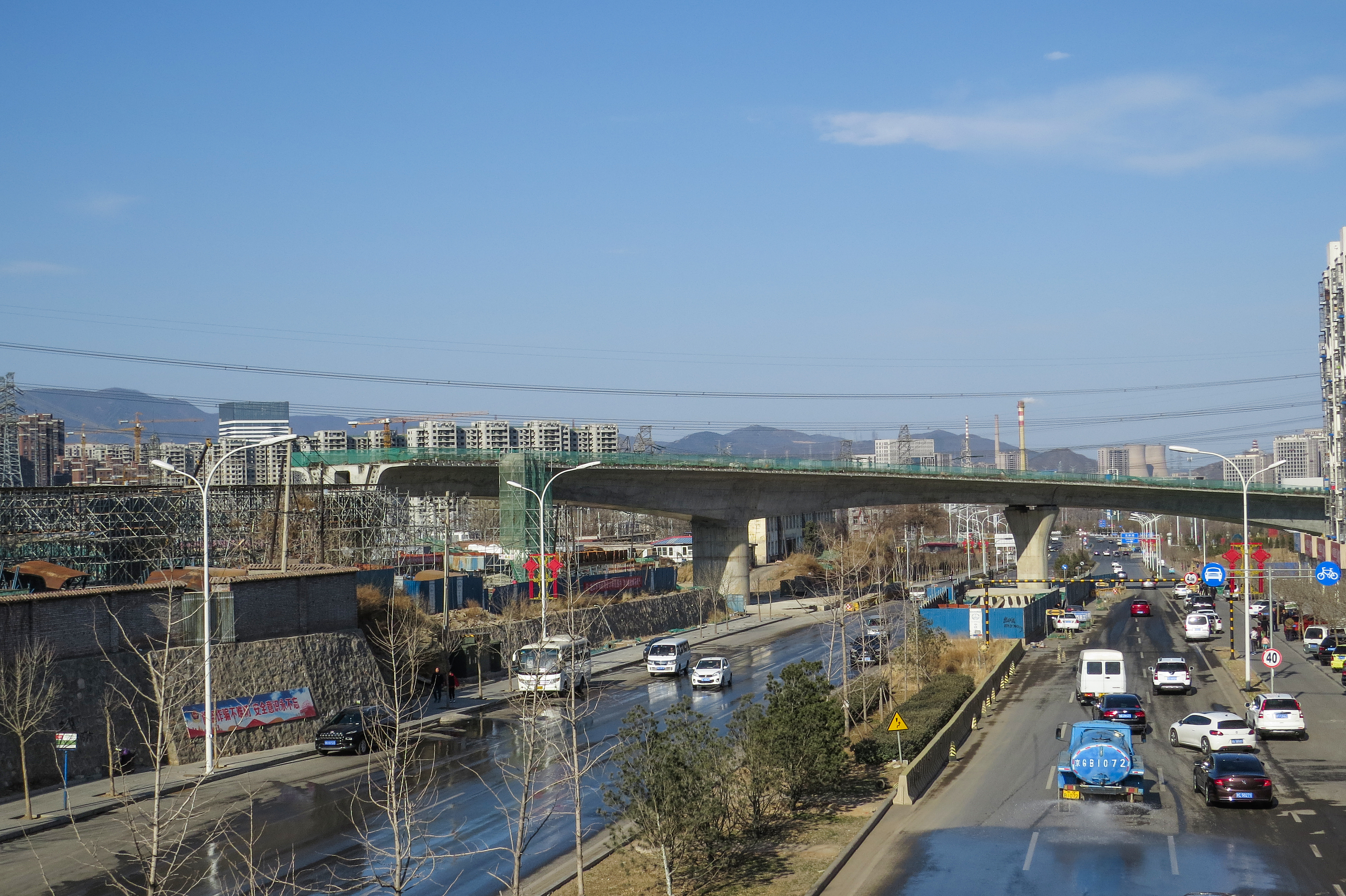
Viaduct of the S1 Line near Shichang under construction in March 2017.

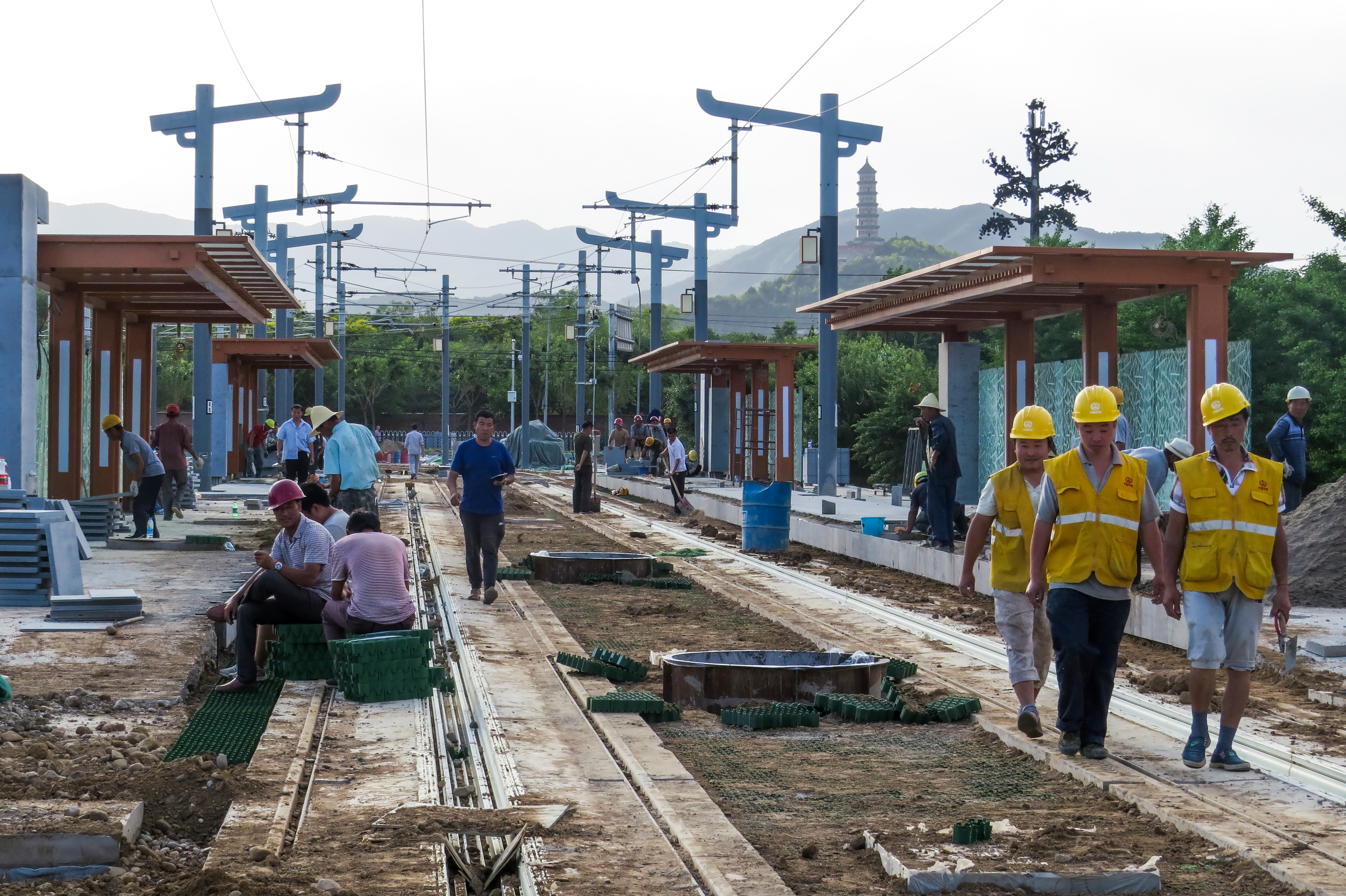
West Gate of Summer Palace on the Xijiao light rail line under construction in May 2017.

=== 2015–present: Phase II projects ===
With the near completion of the three ring, four horizontal, five vertical and seven radial subway network, work began on Phase II expansion projects. These new extensions and lines were expected to be operational in 2019–2021. The following lines were included in the approved Phase II construction plans:

- Line 3
- Line 12
- Line 17
- Line 19: Phase 1
- Line 7: Phase 2 (eastern extension)
- Line 8: Phase 4
- Capital Airport Express: Phase 2 (western extension)
- Fangshan line: Phase 2 (northern extension)
- Changping line: Phase 2 (southern extension)
- Batong line: Phase 2 (southern extension)
- Line 22
- CBD line

On December 9, 2016, construction started on 126 km (78 mi) of new line with the southern extension of Batong Line, the southern extension of Changping line, the Pinggu line, phase one of the New Airport line, and Line 3 Phase I breaking ground. The northern section of Line 16 opened on December 31, 2016. Ridership reached a new high of 3.66 billion. On December 30, 2017, a one-station extension of Fangshan Line (Suzhuang – Yancun East), Yanfang line (Yancun Dong - Yanshan), Xijiao line (Bagou - Fragrant Hills) and S1 line (Shichang – Jin'anqiao) were opened. On December 30, 2018, the western extension of Line 6 (Jin'anqiao – Haidian Wuluju), the South section of Line 8 (Zhushikou – Yinghai), a one-station extension on Line 8 North section (Nanluoguxiang – National Art Museum), a one-station extension on Yizhuang line (Ciqu – Yizhuang Railway Station) were opened. On September 26, 2019, the Daxing Airport Express (Phase 1) (Caoqiao - Daxing Airport) was opened. On December 28, 2019, the eastern extension of Line 7 (Jiaohuachang-Huazhuang) and the southern extension of Batong line (Tuqiao-Huazhuang) were opened. A revision to the Phase II plans in 2019 added Line 11 (branch line for the 2022 Winter Olympics) and a project to split Line 13 to the construction schedule.

Beijing Subway during the COVID-19 pandemic
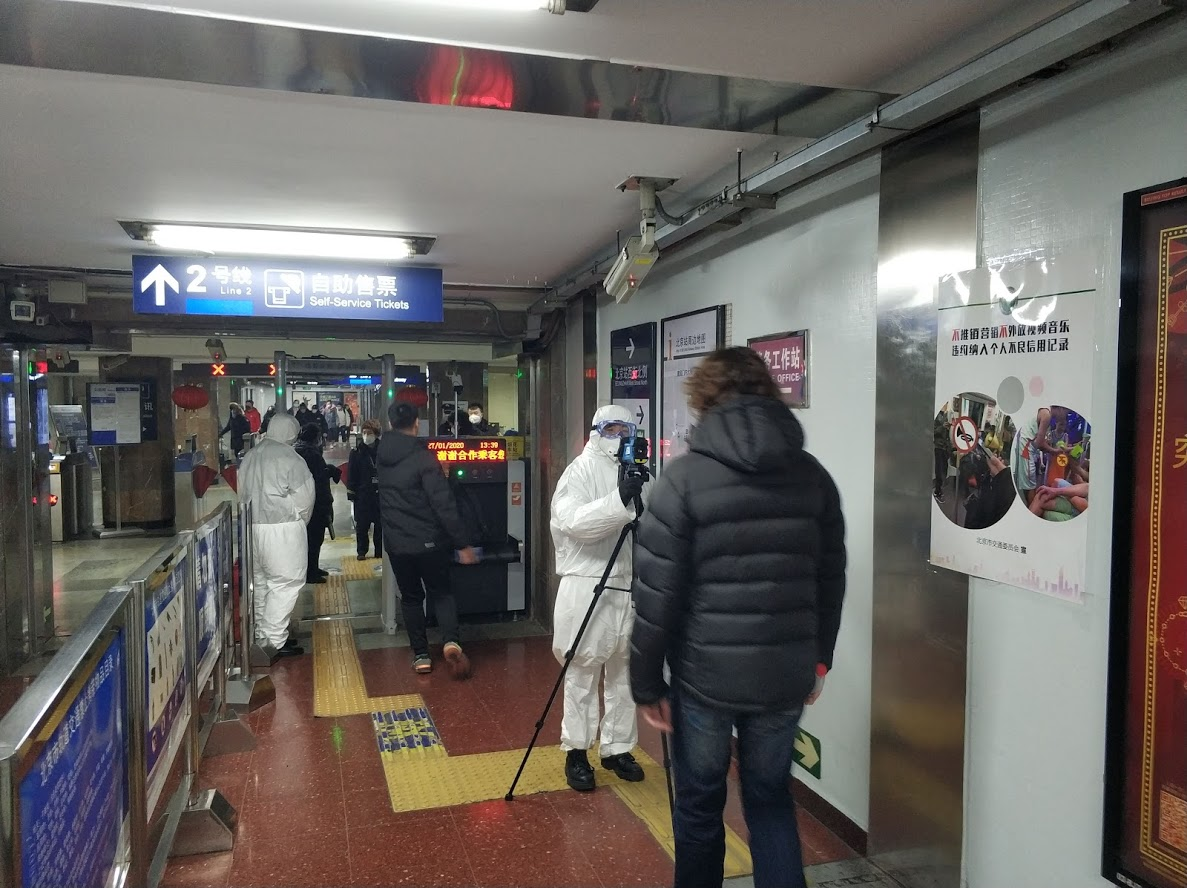
Subway staff in protective clothing check the temperature of a passenger with thermographic camera on January 27, 2020.

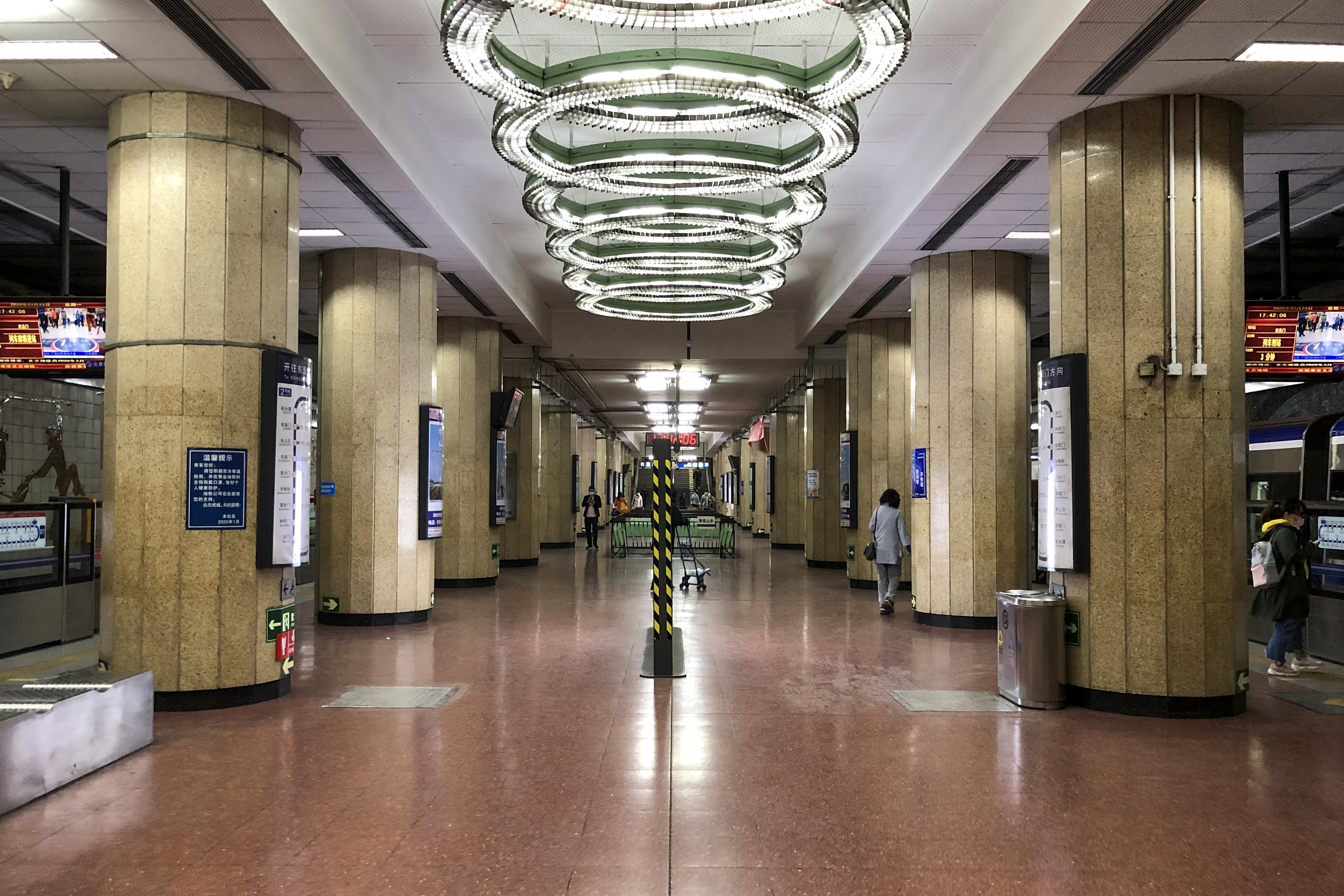
Subway ridership fell sharply during the COVID-19 pandemic. The Line 2 platform of Dongsi Shitiao station was almost vacant during the Friday evening rush hour on March 20, 2020

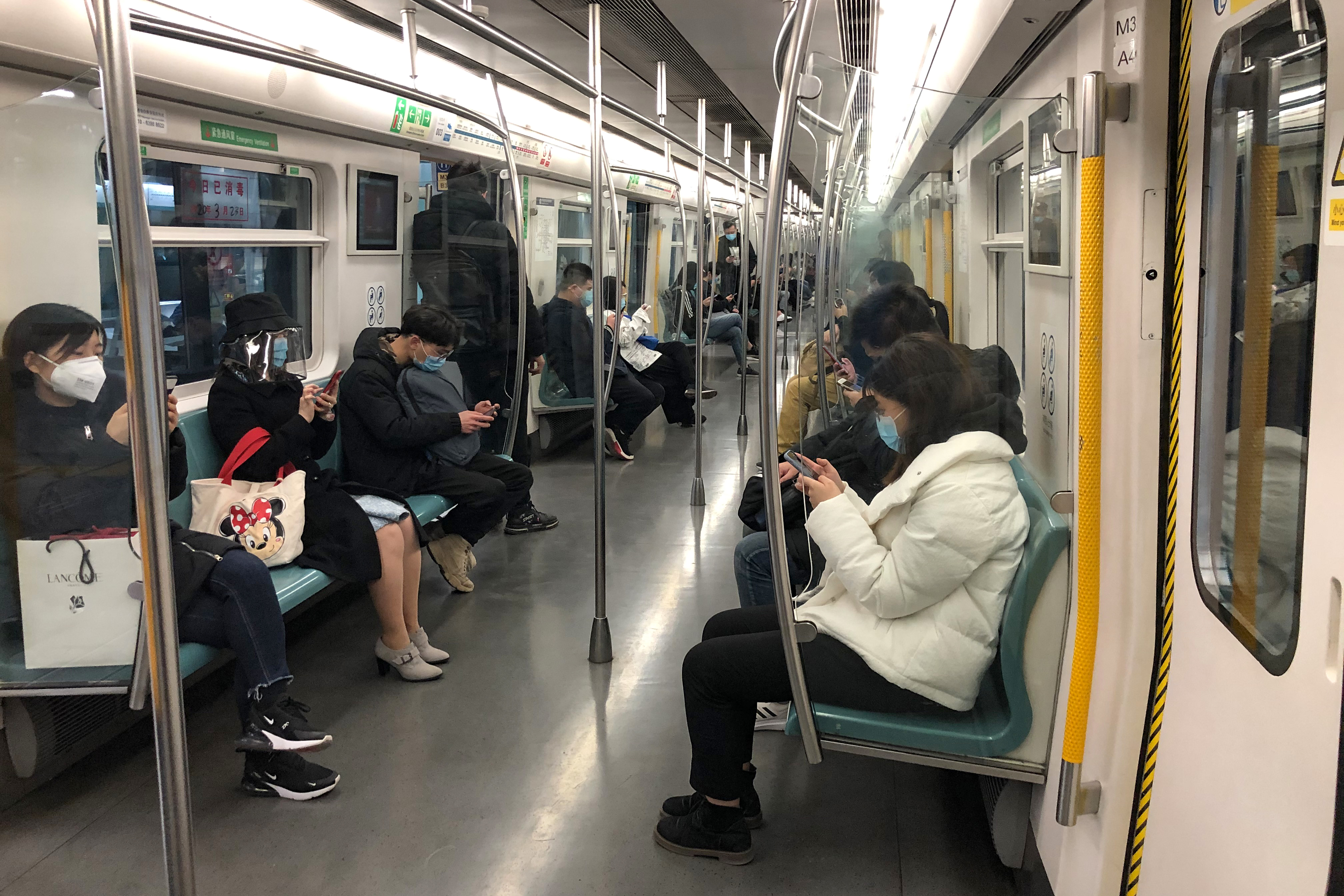
Passengers wear masks and maintain social distancing on a Line 4 train on March 23, 2020.

Recording of announcement on Line 4 train requiring all passengers to wear masks on March 23, 2020.

On January 24, 2020, the day after a lockdown was declared in the city of Wuhan to contain the outbreak of COVID-19 in China, the Beijing Subway began testing body temperature of passengers at the 55 subway stations including the three main railway stations and capital Airport. Temperature checks expanded to all subway stations by January 27.

On April 4, 2020, at 10:00am, Beijing Subway trains joined in China's national mourning of lives lost in the COVID-19 pandemic, by stopping for three minutes and sounding their horns three times, as conductors and passengers stood in silence. To control the spread of COVID-19, certain Line 6 trains were outfitted with smart surveillance cameras that can detect passengers not wearing masks.

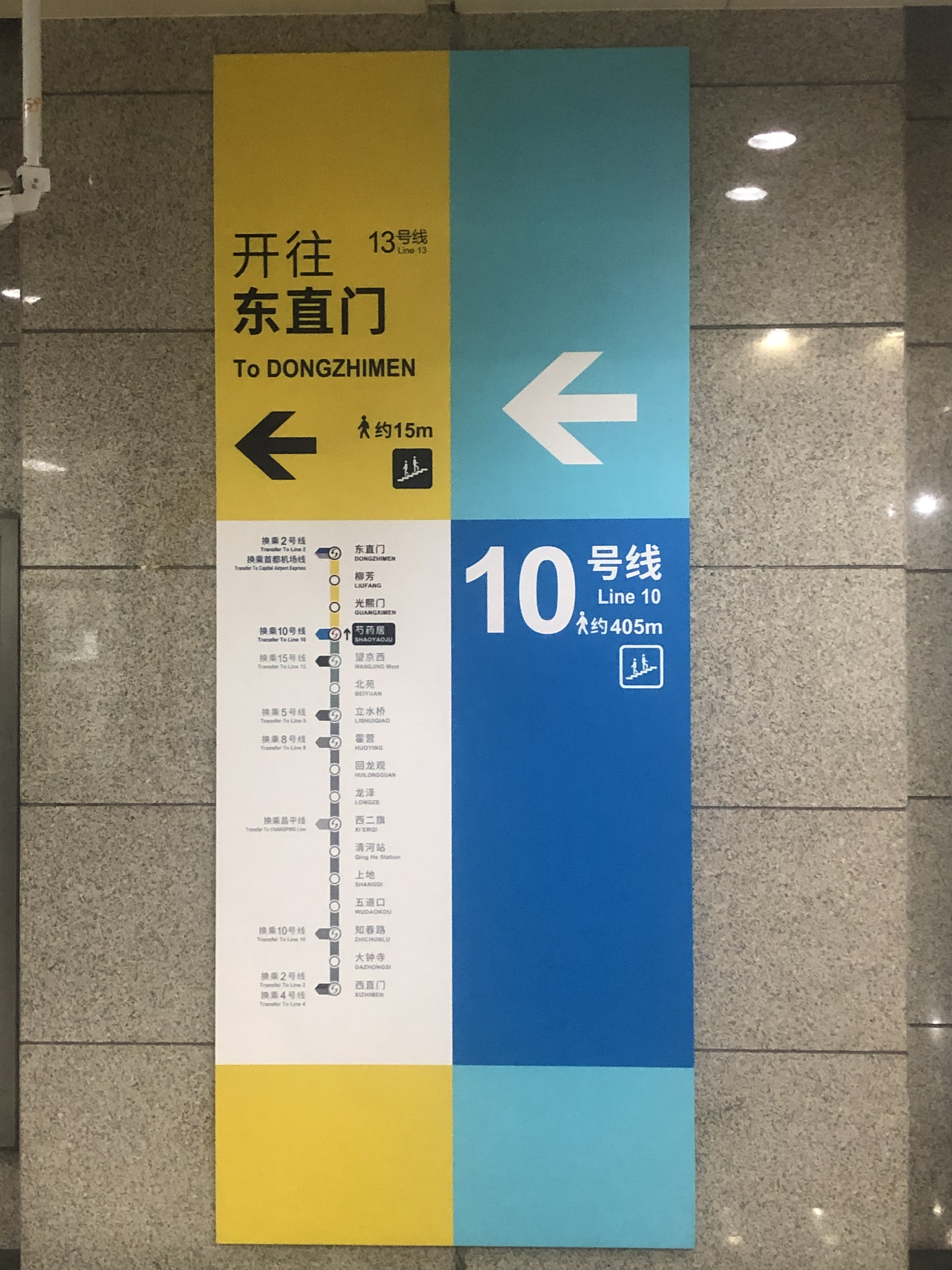
New wayfinding to Line 13

In May 2020, the Beijing Subway began to pilot a new style of wayfinding on Line 13 and Airport Express. However, since then the new designs were not rolled out to other lines or even new lines that opened afterward.

On December 31, 2020, the middle section of Line 16 (Xi Yuan-Ganjia Kou), the northern section of the Fangshan line (Guogongzhuang-Dongguantou Nan(S)), and the Yizhuang T1 line tram were opened.

On August 26, 2021, Line 7 and Batong line extended to Universal Resort station. On August 29, 2021, through operation of Line 1 and Batong line started. On December 31, 2021, the initial sections of Line 11 (Jin'anqiao - Shougang Park), Line 17 (Shilihe - Jiahuihu), Line 19 (Mudanyuan - Xingong); extensions of Capital Airport Express (Dongzhimen - Beixinqiao), Changping line (Xierqi - Qinghe Railway Station), Line S1 (Jin'anqiao - Pingguoyuan), Line 16 (Ganjiakou - Yuyuantan Park East Gate); and the central sections of Line 8 (Zhushikou - National Art Museum) and Line 14 (Beijing South Railway Station - Xiju) were opened. The opening of the central sections of Lines 8 and 14 along with the final section of Line S1 completed the three ring, four horizontal, five vertical and seven radial subway network plan (retroactively named Phase I expansion).

On July 30, 2022, stations Beitaipingzhuang, Ping'anli, Taipingqiao, Jingfengmen of Line 19 were opened. On December 31, 2022, the extension of Line 16 (Yuyuantan Park East Gate - Yushuzhuang) was opened.

On January 18, 2023, in the morning and evening peak hours of the workday, the cross-line operation of Fangshan Line and Line 9 began. On February 4, 2023, the extension of Changping Line (Qinghe Railway Station - Xitucheng) was opened.

On December 15, 2024, lines 3 and 12 were opened together with the remainder of the Changping line's southern extension. By the end of 2024, all of Beijing's 7 major railway stations and 2 international airports have been connected to the metro network.

=== Timeline ===
Commencement	Line	Terminals	Length km	Station(s)	Name
15 January 1971	1	Beijing Railway Station — Gongzhufen	10.7 km (6.65 mi)	10	Phase 1 (initial section)
5 August 1971	1	Yuquan Lu — Gongzhufen	4.9 km (3.04 mi)	3	Yuquan Lu extension
7 November 1971	1	Gucheng — Yuquan Lu	5.4 km (3.36 mi)	3	Gucheng extension
23 April 1973	1	Pingguoyuan — Gucheng	2.6 km (1.62 mi)	1	Pingguoyuan extension
20 September 1984	2	Fuxingmen — Jianguomen	16.1 km (10.00 mi)	12	Phase 2 (initial section)
28 December 1987	1	Nanlishi Lu — Fuxingmen	0.4 km (0.25 mi)	1	Line 1 & 2 realignment project
28 December 1987	1	Changchun Jie — Beijing Railway Station	−6.1 km (−3.79 mi)	-6	Line 1 & 2 realignment project
28 December 1987	2	Fuxingmen — Changchun Jie	1.2 km (0.75 mi)	1	Line 1 & 2 realignment project
28 December 1987	2	Beijing Railway Station — Jianguomen	1.0 km (0.62 mi)	1	Line 1 & 2 realignment project
28 December 1987	2	Changchun Jie — Beijing Railway Station	6.1 km (3.79 mi)	6	Line 1 & 2 realignment project
12 December 1992	1	Fuxingmen — Xidan	1.6 km (0.99 mi)	1	Xidan extension
28 September 1999	1	Tian'anmenxi — Sihuidong	10.1 km (6.28 mi)	10	Fuba line
28 June 2000	1	Xidan — Tian'anmenxi	1.3 km (0.81 mi)	2	Line 1 & Fuba line merging project
28 September 2002	13	Xizhimen — Huoying	20.62 km (12.81 mi)	9	Western section
28 January 2003	13	Huoying — Dongzhimen	20 km (12.43 mi)	7	Eastern section
27 December 2003	Batong	Sihui — Tuqiao	18.964 km (11.78 mi)	13	Phase 1
7 October 2007	5	Songjiazhuang — Tiantongyuanbei	27.6 km (17.15 mi)	23	Initial phase
19 July 2008	8	Forest Park South Gate — Beitucheng	3.583 km (2.23 mi)	3	Phase 1 (Olympic Branch Line)
19 July 2008	10	Bagou — Jingsong	24.680 km (15.34 mi)	22	Phase 1
19 July 2008	Capital Airport	Dongzhimen — Terminal 3 / Terminal 2	28.1 km (17.46 mi)	4	Initial phase
10 October 2008	8	Olympic Sports Center	—	1	Infill station
28 September 2009	4	Anheqiaobei — Gongyi Xiqiao	28.2 km (17.52 mi)	24	Initial phase
30 December 2010	Daxing	Gongqi Xiqiao — Tiangongyuan	21.76 km (13.52 mi)	11	Initial phase
30 December 2010	15	Wangjingxi — Houshayu	17.725 km (11.01 mi)	8	Phase 1 (1st section)
30 December 2010	Fangshan	Dabaotai — Suzhuang	21.726 km (13.50 mi)	10	Phase 1 (1st section)
30 December 2010	Yizhuang	Songjiazhuang — Ciqu	21.4 km (13.30 mi)	13	Initial phase
30 December 2010	Changping	Nanshao — Xi'erqi	21.3 km (13.24 mi)	7	Phase 1
25 December 2010	13	Xi'erqi (new) opens, Xi'erqi (old) closes	—	—	Xi'erqi replacement project
31 December 2011	8	Huilongguan Dongdajie — Forest Park South Gate	10.700 km (6.65 mi)	6	Phase 2 (northern section)
31 December 2011	9	Beijing West Railway Station — Guogongzhuang	5.379 km (3.34 mi)	8	Southern section
31 December 2011	15	Houshayu — Fengbo	11.060 km (6.87 mi)	4	Phase 1 (2nd section)
31 December 2011	Fangshan	Guogongzhuang — Dabaotai	1.438 km (0.89 mi)	1	Phase 1 (2nd section)
12 October 2012	9	Fengtai & Dongdajie opens	—	2	Infill stations
30 December 2012	6	Haidian Wuluju — Caofang	29.882 km (18.57 mi)	20	Phase 1
30 December 2012	10	Xiju — Bagou	13.843 km (8.60 mi)	9	Phase 2 (initial section)
30 December 2012	10	Jingsong — Capital University of Economics & Business	15.932 km (9.90 mi)	11	Phase 2 (initial section)
30 December 2012	8	Beitucheng — Gulou Dajie	3.375 km (2.10 mi)	2	Phase 2 (1st southern section)
30 December 2012	9	National Library — Beijing West Railway Station	10.282 km (6.39 mi)	3	Northern section
5 May 2013	10	Capital University of Economics & Business — Xiju	3.420 km (2.13 mi)	2	Phase 2 (final)
5 May 2013	10	Jiaomendong opens	—	1	Infill station
5 May 2013	14	Zhangguozhuang — Xiju	12.4 km (7.71 mi)	6	Western section
21 December 2013	9	Military Museum opens	—	1	Infill station
28 December 2013	8	Gulou Dajie — Nanluogu	2.090 km (1.30 mi)	2	Phase 2 (2nd southern section)
28 December 2013	8	Zhuxinzhuang — Huilongguan Dongdajie	6.659 km (4.14 mi)	3	Changping Line & Line 8 connector project
15 February 2014	14	Qilizhuang opens	—	1	Infill station
28 December 2014	6	Caofang — Lucheng	12.751 km (7.92 mi)	6	Phase 2
28 December 2014	7	Beijing West Railway Station — Jiaohuachang	23.7 km (14.73 mi)	19	Phase 1
28 December 2014	14	Jintai Lu — Shangezhuang	14.8 km (9.20 mi)	10	1st part of eastern section
28 December 2014	15	Qinghua Donglu Xikou — Wangjingxi	9.944 km (6.18 mi)	6	Phase 1 (3rd section)
26 December 2015	8	Andeli Beijie	—	1	Infill station
26 December 2015	14	Beijing South Railway Station — Jintai Lu	16.6 km (10.31 mi)	9	2nd part of eastern section
26 December 2015	15	Datunludong opens	—	1	Infill station
26 December 2015	Changping	Changping Xishankou — Nanshao	10.6 km (6.59 mi)	5	Phase 2
31 December 2016	14	Chaoyang Park opens	—	1	Infill station
31 December 2016	15	Wangjingdong opens	—	1	Infill station
31 December 2016	15	Bei'anhe — Xi Yuan	19.6 km (12.18 mi)	9	Northern section
30 December 2017	14	Pingleyuan opens	—	1	Infill station
30 December 2017	16	Nongda Nanlu opens	—	1	Infill station
30 December 2017	Fangshan	Suzhuang — Yancundong	2.2 km (1.37 mi)	1	Western extension
30 December 2017	Yanfang	Yancundong — Yanshan	14.4 km (8.95 mi)	9	Main line
30 December 2017	S1	Jin'anqiao — Shichang	8.216 km (5.11 mi)	7	Initial phase
30 December 2017	Xijiao	Bagou — Fragrant Hills	8.8 km (5.47 mi)	6	Initial phase
30 December 2018	6	Jin'anqiao — Haidian Wuluju	10.556 km (6.56 mi)	5	Phase 3
30 December 2018	6	Beiyunhedong opens	—	1	Infill station
30 December 2018	7	Fatou opens	—	1	Infill station
30 December 2018	8	Nanluogu Xiang — National Art Museum	1.88 km (1.17 mi)	1	Phase 2 (3rd southern section)
30 December 2018	8	Zhushikou — Yinghai	16.4 km (10.19 mi)	12	Phase 3 (southern section) & Phase 4
30 December 2018	Yizhuang	Ciqu — Yizhuang Railway Station	1.334 km (0.83 mi)	1	One-station extension
26 September 2019	Daxing Airport	Caoqiao — Daxing Airport	41.36 km (25.70 mi)	3	Phase 1
28 December 2019	7	Jiaohuachang — Huazhuang	1.769 km (1.10 mi)	8	Phase 2 (eastern extension)
28 December 2019	7	Shuangjing opens	—	1	Infill station
28 December 2019	Batong	Tuqiao — Huazhuang	2.731 km (1.70 mi)	1	Phase 2 (southern extension)
28 December 2019	13	Qinghe Railway Station opens	—	1	Infill station
18 April 2020	1	Pingguoyuan closes	−2.606 km (−1.62 mi)	-1	Closed for renovation works
31 December 2020	16	Xi Yuan — Ganjia Kou	10.929 km (6.79 mi)	5	Middle section
31 December 2020	Fangshan	Guogongzhuang — Dongguantounan	4.8 km (2.98 mi)	4	Northern extension
31 December 2020	Yizhuang T1	Quzhuang — Dinghaiyuan	11.9 km (7.39 mi)	14	Initial section
26 August 2021	7	Huazhuang — Universal Resort	1.769 km (1.10 mi)	1	Phase 2 (eastern section)
26 August 2021	Batong	Huazhuang — Universal Resort	1.769 km (1.10 mi)	1	Phase 2 (southern extension)
31 December 2021	6	Pingguoyuan opens	—	1	Infill station
31 December 2021	8	National Art Museum — Zhushikou	4.3 km (2.67 mi)	3	Phase 3 (northern section)
31 December 2021	11	Jin'anqiao — Shougang Park	1.5 km (0.93 mi)	3	Phase 1
31 December 2021	14	Beijing South Railway Station — Xiju	4 km (2.49 mi)	5	Central section
31 December 2021	16	Ganjia Kou — Yuyuantan Park East Gate	0.97 km (0.60 mi)	1	Middle section
31 December 2021	17	Shilihe — Jiahuihu	15.8 km (9.82 mi)	7	Southern section
31 December 2021	19	Mudanyuan — Xingong	20.6 km (12.80 mi)	6	Phase 1
31 December 2021	Capital Airport	Dongzhimen — Beixinqiao	1.8 km (1.12 mi)	1	Western extension
31 December 2021	Changping	Xi'erqi — Qinghe Railway Station	1.5 km (0.93 mi)	1	Southern extension
31 December 2021	S1	Jin'anqiao — Pingguoyuan	1.149 km (0.71 mi)	1	Remaining section
30 July 2022	19	Beitaipingzhuang, Ping'anli, Taipingqiao & Jingfengmen opens	—	4	Infill stations
31 December 2022	16	Yuyuantan Park East Gate — Yushuzhuang	14.234 km (8.84 mi)	9	Southern section
4 February 2023	Changping	Qinghe Railway Station — Xitucheng	9.7 km (6.03 mi)	5	Southern extension
18 March 2023	6	Erligou opens	—	1	Infill station
18 March 2023	16	Erligou opens	—	1	Infill station
30 December 2023	11	Moshikou — Jin'anqiao	1.4 km (0.87 mi)	1	Phase 1
30 December 2023	16	Yushuzhuang — Wanpingcheng	2.7 km (1.68 mi)	2	Southern extension
30 December 2023	16	Suzhou Jie opens	—	1	Infill station
30 December 2023	17	Future Science City North — Workers' Stadium	24.9 km (15.47 mi)	9	Northern section
15 December 2024	3	Dongsi Shitiao — Dongbabei	14.7 km (9.13 mi)	10	Initial section
15 December 2024	12	Sijiqing Qiao — Dongbabei	27.5 km (17.09 mi)	20	Initial section
15 December 2024	Changping	Xitucheng — Jimen Qiao	0.7 km (0.43 mi)	1	Southern extension
15 December 2024	Changping	Zhufangbei opens	—	1	Infill station
19 January 2025	16	Lize Shangwuqu	—	1	Infill station
2 June 2025	1	Bajiao Amusement Park closes	—	-1	Under renovation (reopening on 3 May 2027)
8 November 2025	8	Dahong Men opens	—	1	Infill station
27 December 2025	6	Lucheng — Luyang	2.1 km (1.30 mi)	1	Phase 2 (southern extension)
27 December 2025	17	Workers' Stadium — Shilihe	8.2 km (5.10 mi)	3	Middle section
27 December 2025	18	Malianwa — Tiantongyuandong	19.805 km (12.31 mi)	11	Initial section
31 January 2026	17	Wangjingxi opens	—	1	Infill station
15 February 2026	1	Gucheng & Babaoshan stations closed	5.353 km (3.33 mi)	-2	Temporary closure for Line 1 branch works
16 May 2026	1	Gucheng, Babaoshan and Pingguoyuan stations reopen	7.959 km (4.95 mi)	3	Pingguoyuan station renovation works complete
30 June 2026	6	Tongyun Men opens	—	1	Infill station

=== Ridership ===
View source data.

Average Daily Ridership

Year	Riders	±%
1971	22,685	—
1972	41,066	+81.0%
1973	31,151	−24.1%
1974	31,014	−0.4%
1975	53,233	+71.6%
1976	60,792	+14.2%
1977	77,699	+27.8%
1978	84,740	+9.1%
1979	131,096	+54.7%
1980	150,847	+15.1%
1981	177,151	+17.4%
1982	198,712	+12.2%
1983	224,630	+13.0%
1984	281,530	+25.3%

Year	Riders	±%
1985	382,548	+35.9%
1986	432,301	+13.0%
1987	526,767	+21.9%
1988	838,743	+59.2%
1989	850,740	+1.4%
1990	1,045,973	+22.9%
1991	1,016,082	−2.9%
1992	1,169,699	+15.1%
1993	1,345,479	+15.0%
1994	1,460,164	+8.5%
1995	1,528,822	+4.7%
1996	1,213,497	−20.6%
1997	1,219,342	+0.5%
1998	1,265,753	+3.8%

Year	Riders	±%
1999	1,317,808	+4.1%
2000	1,185,792	−10.0%
2001	1,284,932	+8.4%
2002	1,312,329	+2.1%
2003	1,293,151	−1.5%
2004	1,658,470	+28.3%
2005	1,857,534	+12.0%
2006	2,106,575	+13.4%
2007	1,794,521	−14.8%
2008	3,278,689	+82.7%
2009	3,991,781	+21.7%
2010	5,041,096	+26.3%
2011	5,972,603	+18.5%
2012	6,721,311	+12.5%

Year	Riders	±%
2013	8,791,781	+30.8%
2014	9,278,600	+5.5%
2015	8,904,109	−4.0%
2016	9,998,000	+12.3%
2017	10,350,411	+3.5%
2018	10,543,608	+1.9%
2019	10,821,500	+2.6%
2020	6,256,831	−42.2%
2021	8,465,753	+35.3%
2022	6,191,781	−26.9%
2023	9,452,055	+52.7%
2024	9,896,175	+4.7%

Source: 北京地铁大事记回顾 1965-2006 • 北京市2010年暨"十一五"期间国民经济和社会发展统计公报 • 北京市2011年国民经济和社会发展统计公报 • 北京市2012年国民经济和社会发展统计公报 • 北京市2013年国民经济和社会发展统计公报 • • 北京市2015年暨"十二五"时期国民经济和社会发展统计公报 • • • • 北京市2020年国民经济和社会发展统计公报 • 北京市2021年国民经济和社会发展统计公报 • 北京市2022年国民经济和社会发展统计公报 • 北京市2023年国民经济和社会发展统计公报 • 北京市2024年国民经济和社会发展统计公报

== Facilities ==
=== Accessibility ===
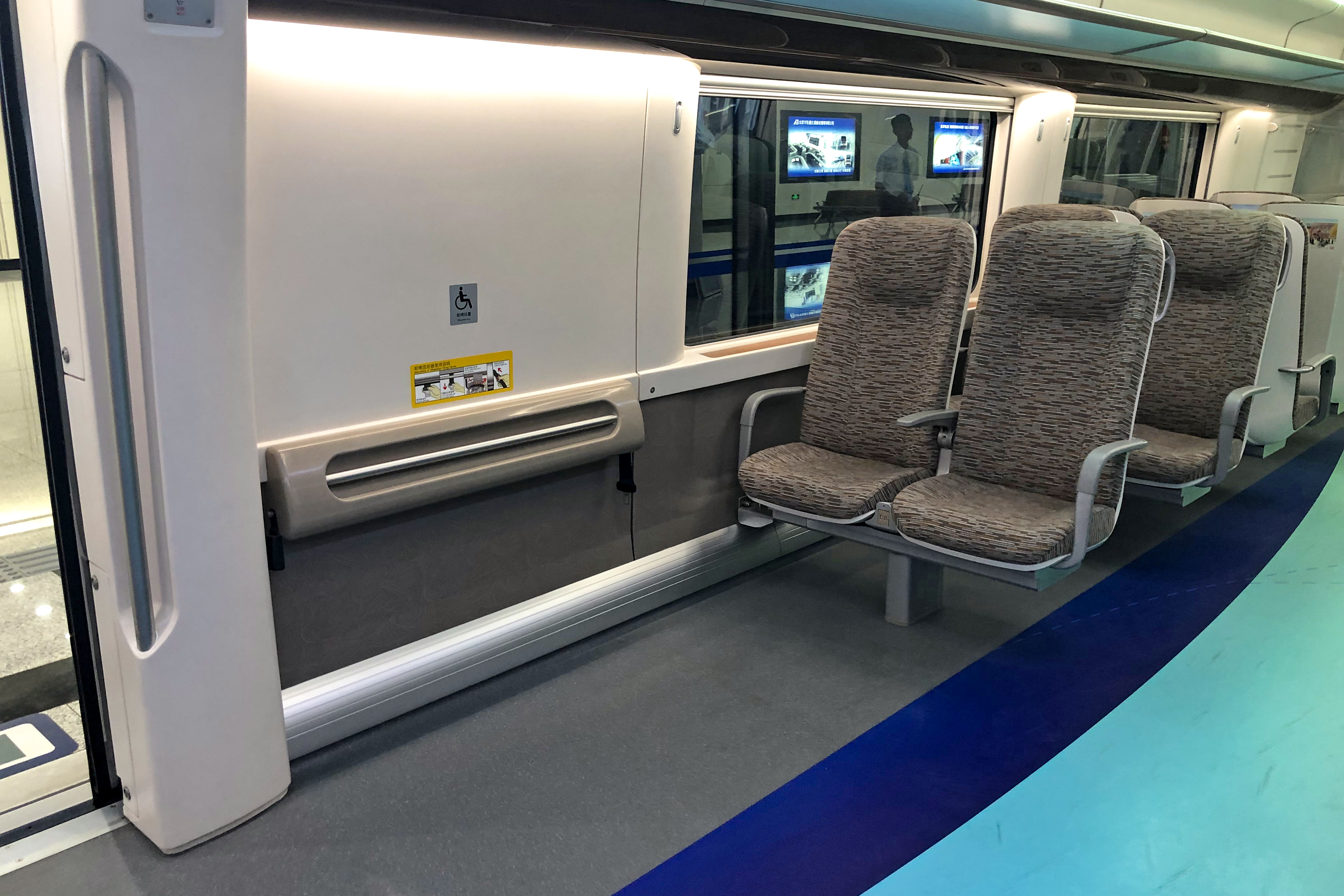
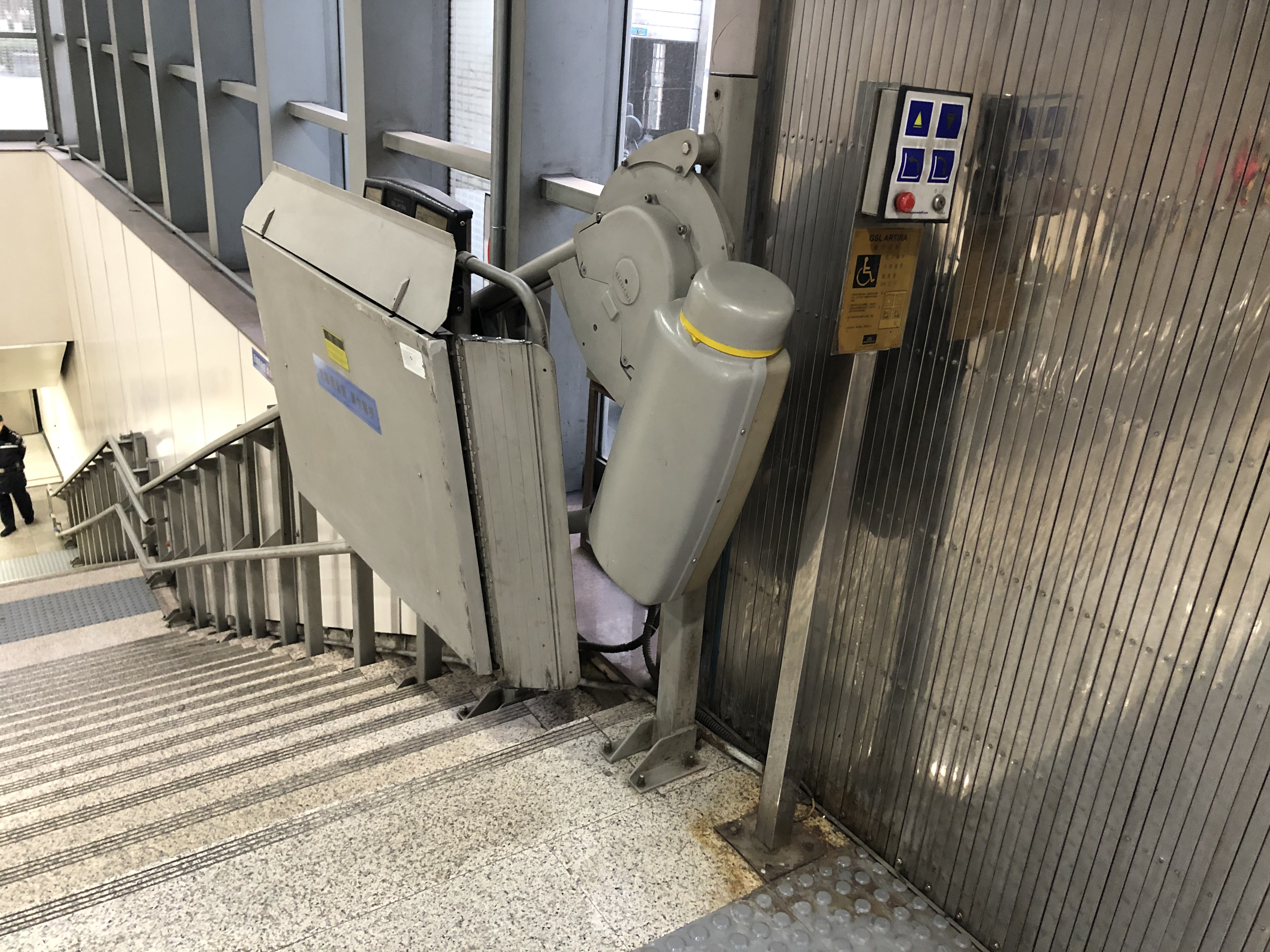
Left: Space for wheelchair inside Daxing Airport Express.
Right: A foldable wheelchair lift inside Exit A of the Dongdan station. Most stations built after 2007 have elevators. Older stations have been outfitted with wheelchair lifts. Tactile paving is found throughout stations.

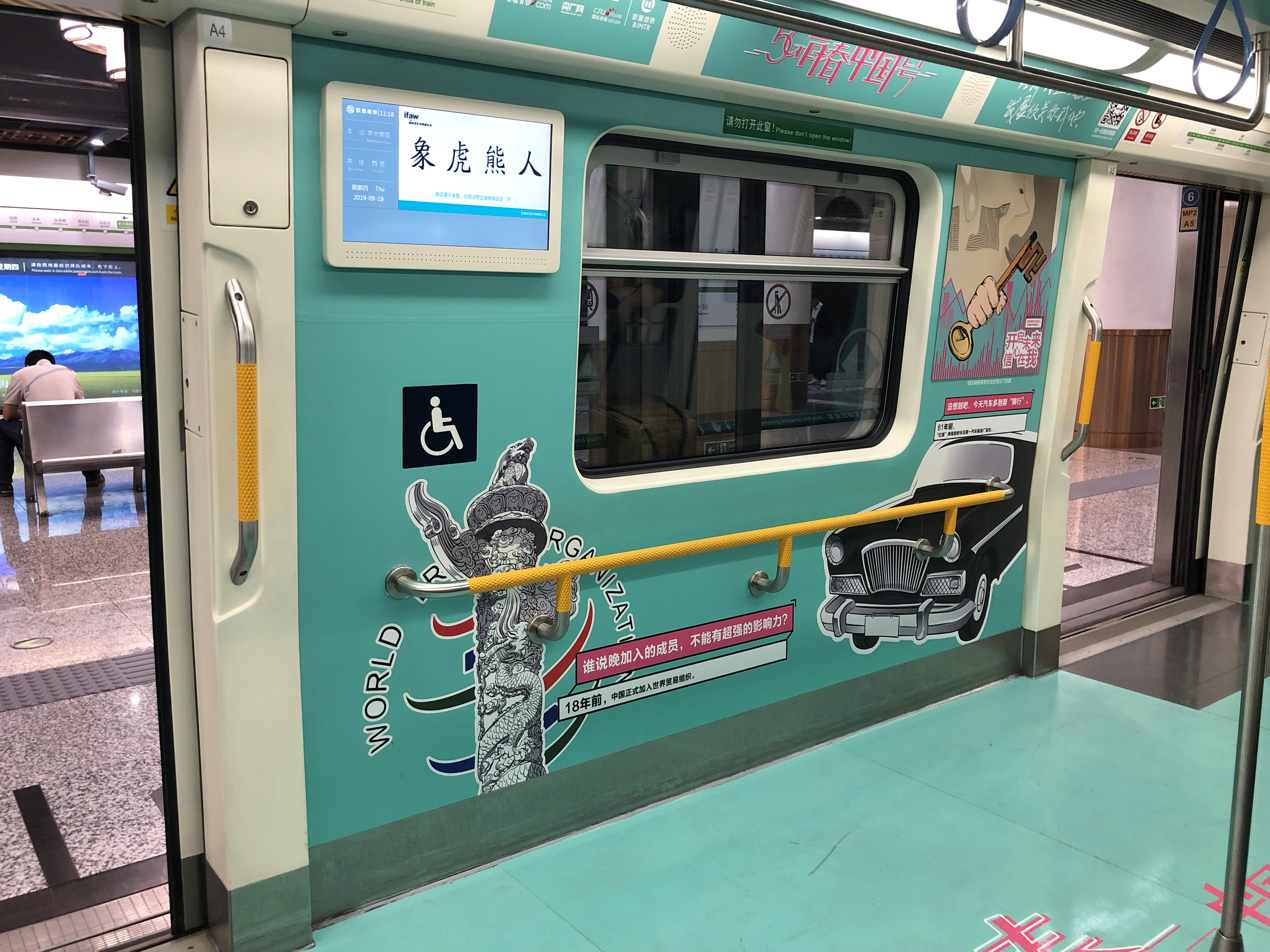
Wheelchair space in Beijing Subway

Each station is equipped with ramps, lifts, or elevators to facilitate wheelchair access. Newer model train cars now provide space to accommodate wheelchairs. Automated audio announcements for incoming trains are available in all lines. On all lines, station names are announced in Mandarin Chinese and English. Under subway regulations, riders with mobility limitations may obtain assistance from subway staff to enter and exit stations and trains, and visually impaired riders may bring assistance devices and guide dogs into the subway.

=== Cellular network coverage ===
Mobile phones can currently be used throughout the network. In 2014, Beijing Subway started upgrading cellular networks in the Beijing subway to 4G. In 2016, the entire subway network has 4G coverage. Since 2019, 5G coverage is being rolled out across the network.

=== Commercial facilities ===
In the 1990s a number of fast food and convenience stores operated in the Beijing Subway. In 2002, fourteen Wumart convenience stores opened in various Line 2 stations.

After witnessing the Daegu subway fire in February 2003, the Beijing Subway gradually removed the 80 newsstands and fast food restaurants across 39 stations in Line 1 and Line 2. The popular underground mall at Xidan station was closed. This was in contrast to other systems in China which added more commercial outlets in stations as they started to rapidly expand their networks. Since the implementation of this policy new lines did not have any outlets upon opening.

Passengers consistently complained that the lack of commercial outlets in the Beijing Subway was inconvenient. In the early 2010s, Beijing Subway started reversing some of these policies. Vending machines selling drinks and snacks have been gradually introduced inside stations since 2013. Later machines with other common items such as flowers, earphones, masks, etc. were also introduced. In 2013, China Resources Vanguard and FamilyMart expressed interest in opening convenience stores in the Beijing Subway but this never materialized.

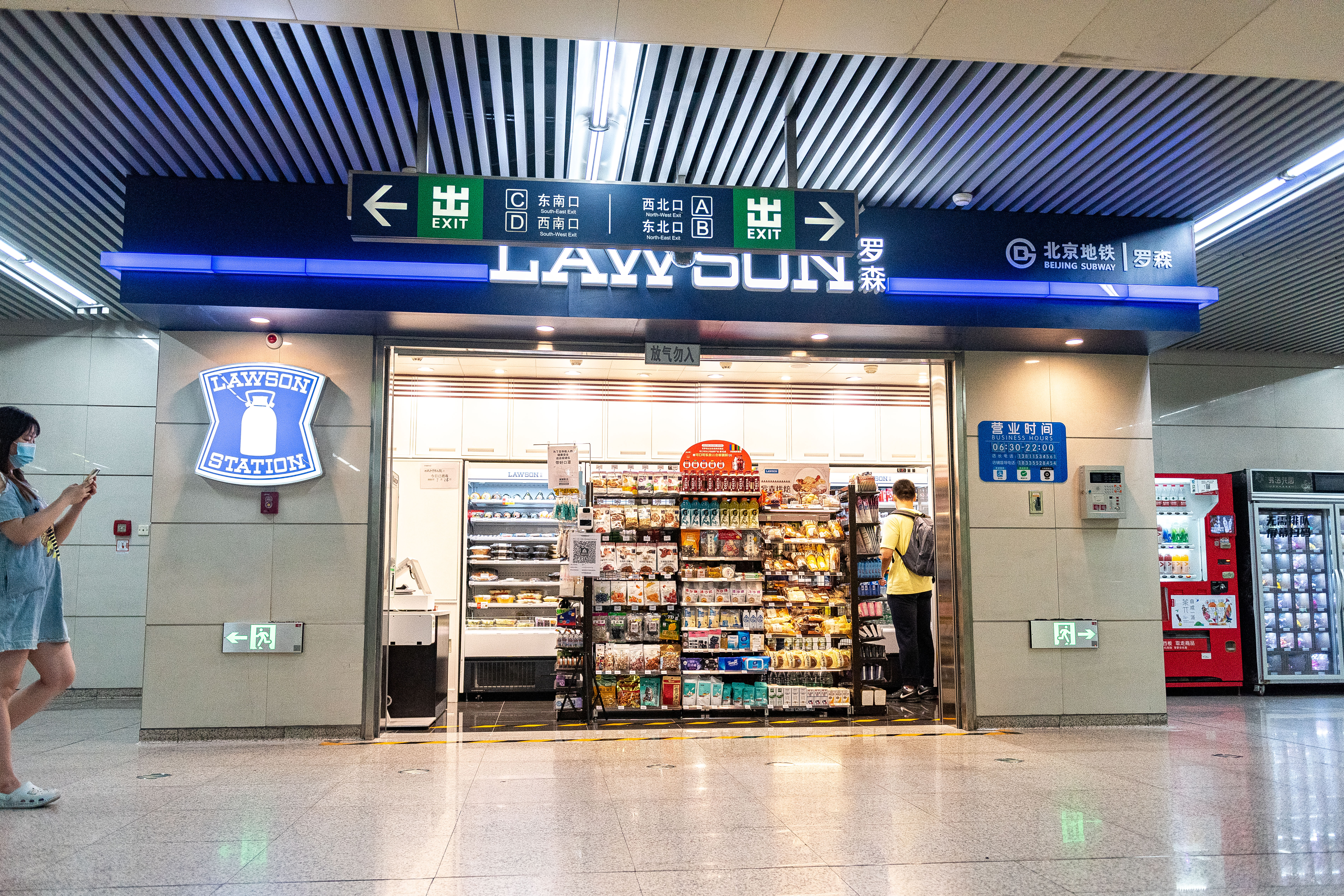
On July 25, 2021, Lawson opened a store in the paid area of Hepingli Beijie Station.

The survey report on passenger satisfaction in subway services since 2018 shows that more than 70% of passengers want convenience stores in subway stations, especially for various hot and cold drinks, ready-to-eat food, and bento meals. In December 2020, "the deployment of 130 convenient service facilities at subway stations" was listed as a key project for the Beijing municipal government. On July 25, 2021, Beijing Subway selected three stations, Hepingli Beijie station of Line 5, Qingnian Lu station of Line 6, and Caishikou station of Line 7, to carry out a pilot program of opening convenience stores. Since December 2021, a rapid rollout of station commerce began on a large scale across the network with a variety of commercial establishments such as bookstores, pharmacies, flower shops and specialty vendors being constructed inside stations.

=== Information hotline and app ===
The Beijing Subway telephone hotline was initiated on the eve of the 2008 Summer Olympic Games to provide traveler information, receive complaints and suggestions, and file lost and found reports. The hotline combined the nine public service telephones of various subway departments. On December 29, 2013, the hotline number was switched from (010)-6834-5678 to (010)-96165 for abbreviated dialing. In December 2014, the hotline began offering fare information, as the subway switched to distance-based fare. The hotline has staffed service from 5 am to midnight and has automated service during unstaffed hours.

The Beijing Subway has an official mobile application and a number of third-party apps.

=== English station names ===
According to the related rules released in 2006, all the place names, common names and proper names of subway stations and bus stops should use uppercase Hanyu Pinyin. For example, Nanlishi Lu Station should be written as NANLISHILU Station. However, names of venues can use English translation, such as Military Museum.

According to the translation standard released in December 2017, station names of rail transit and public transport have to follow the laws.

Since December 2018, Beijing Subway has changed the format of names of the new subway stations every year. On the subway map of December 2018, the station names used Roman script, and it gave consideration to English writing habit and pronunciation. The format changed to verbatim in December 2019, where the positions (East, South, West and North) were written in Hanyu Pinyin and an English abbreviation was added to them.

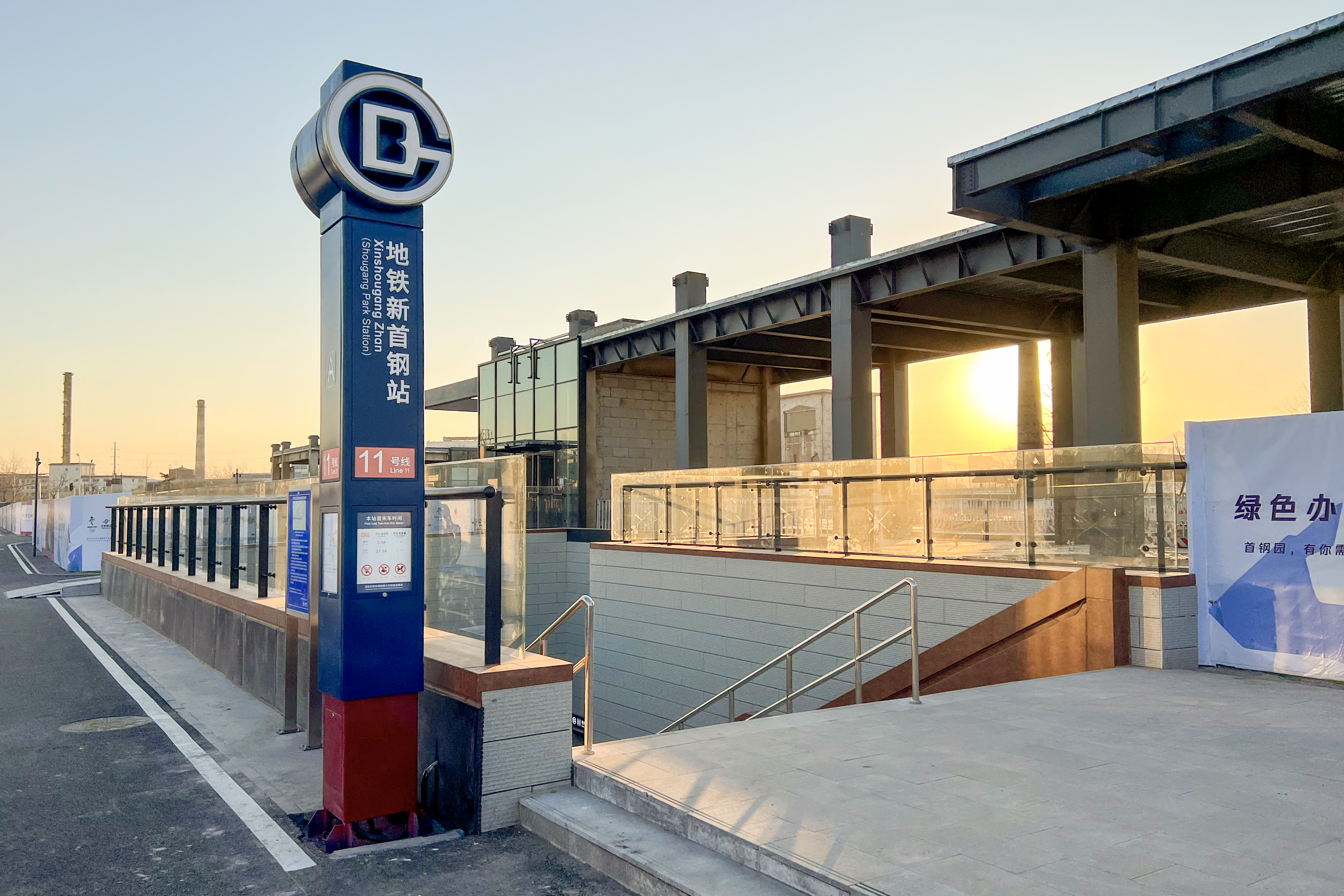
Station sign at Xinshougang (Shougang Park) station. (January 2022)

Since December 31, 2021, Beijing Subway has started using a new station name format. The Pinyin "Zhan" is used instead of English word "Station" on the light box at the subway entrance. This caused a strong disagreement. Citizens criticized it, making comments like "Chinese do not need to read and foreigners cannot read it". Some of the landmark named stations use Chinese name, Hanyu Pinyin and English translation. Some of the stations that used English translation names (such as Shahe Univ. Park, Life Science Park and Liangxiang Univ. Town) changed to Hanyu Pinyin only (These stations changed back to English translations in December 2022). Lines 3, 12 and 18 use the translation rules that announced in 2024. For example, "Dongbabei", "Dongbaxi", "Jiangtaixi", "Huoyingdong", "Tiantongyuandong", "Sijiqing Qiao" and "Shangdi Software Park".

== System upgrades ==
=== Capacity ===
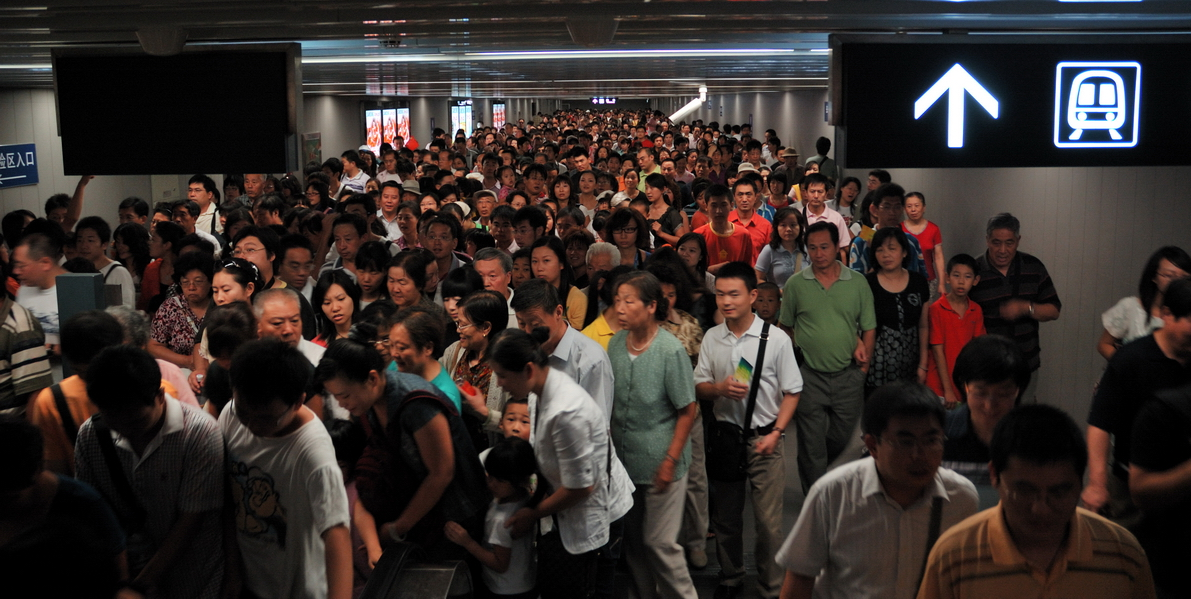
A crowded transfer corridor on Line 10.

With new lines drawing more riders to the network, the subway has experienced severe overcrowding, especially during the rush hour. Since 2015, significant sections of Lines 1, 4 – Daxing, 5, 10, 13, Batong and Changping are officially over capacity during rush hour. By 2019, Lines 1, 2, 4, 5, 6 and 10 all have daily weekday ridership's of over 1 million passengers a day each. In short term response, the subway upgraded electrical, signal and yard equipment to increase the frequency of trains to add additional capacity. Peak headways have been reduced to 1 min. 43 sec. on Line 4; 1 min. 45 sec. on Lines 1/Batong, 5, 9, and 10; 2 min. on Lines 2, 6, 13 and Changping; 2 min. and 35 sec. on Line 15; 3 min. 30 sec. on Line 8; and 15 min. on the Airport Express. The Beijing Subway is investigating the feasibility of reducing headways of Line 10 down to 1 min 40 seconds.

Lines 13 and Batong have converted 4-car to 6-car trains. Lines 6 and 7 have longer platforms that can accommodate 8-car type B trains, while lines 14, 16, 17 and 19 use higher capacity wide-body type A trains (all mentioned except Line 14 use eight-car trains). New lines that cross the city center such as Line 3 and Line 12, now under construction, will also adopt high capacity 8-car type A trains with a 70 percent increase in capacity over older lines using 6 car type B. When completed these lines are expected to greatly relieve overcrowding in the existing network.

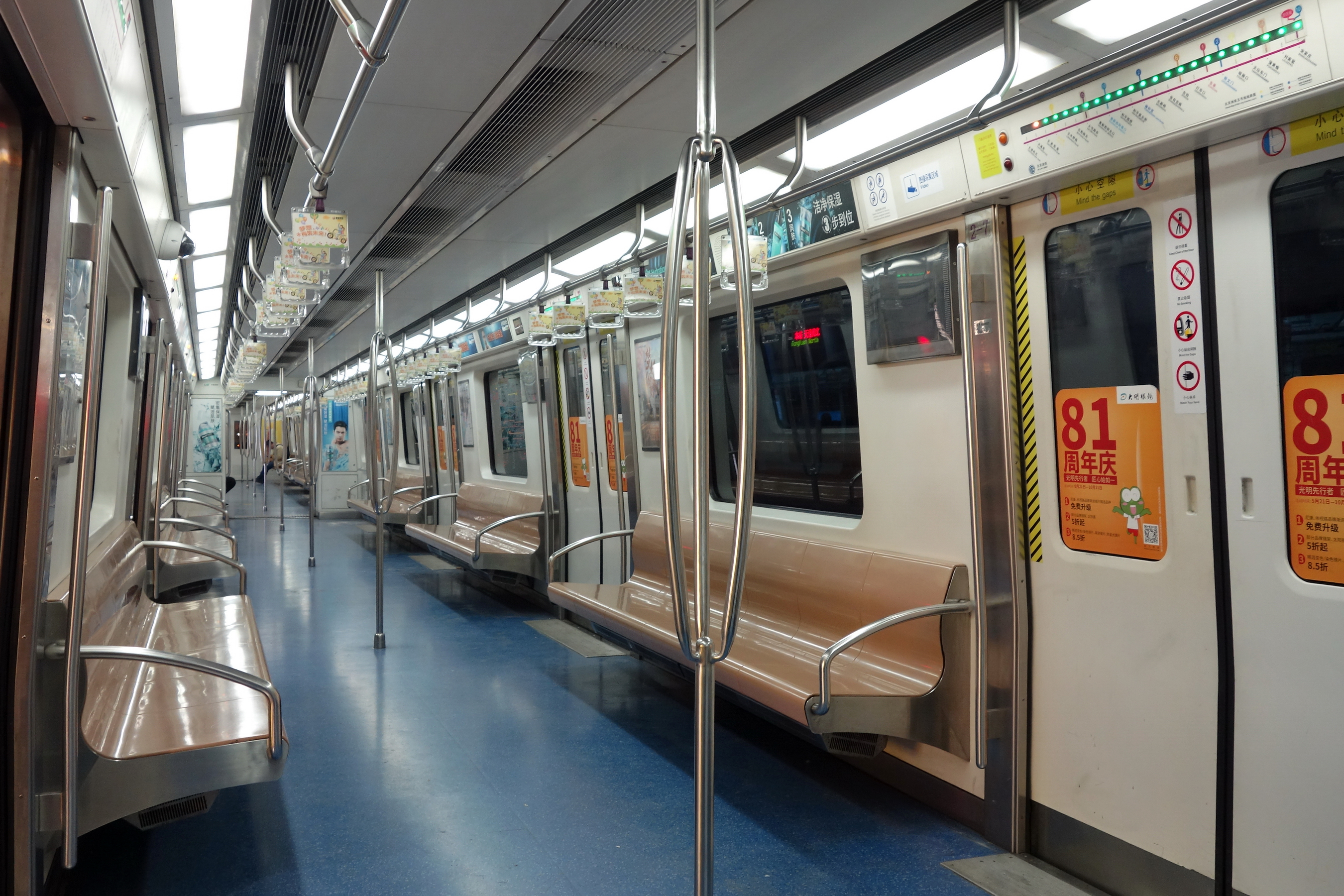
The articulated cars of Line 5 trains have greater carrying capacity.

Despite these efforts, during the morning rush hour, conductors at line terminals and other busy stations must routinely restrict the number of passengers who can board each train to prevent the train from becoming too crowded for passengers waiting at other stations down the line. Some of these stations have built queuing lines outside the stations to manage the flow of waiting passengers. As of August 31, 2011, 25 stations mainly on Lines 1, 5, 13, and Batong have imposed such restrictions. By January 7, 2013, 41 stations on Lines 1, 2, 5, 13, Batong, and Changping had instituted passenger flow restrictions during the morning rush hour. The number of stations with passenger flow restrictions reached 110 in January 2019, affecting all lines except Lines 15, 16, Fangshan, Yanfang and S1. Lines 4, 5, 10 and 13 strategically run several empty train runs during rush hour bound for specific stations help clear busy station queues. Counter peak flow express trains started operating on Line 15, Changping and Batong to minimize line runtimes and allow the existing fleet size to serve more passengers during peak periods. Additionally, investigations are being carried out on Line 15 and Yizhuang for upgrading to 120 km/h operations.

=== Transfers ===
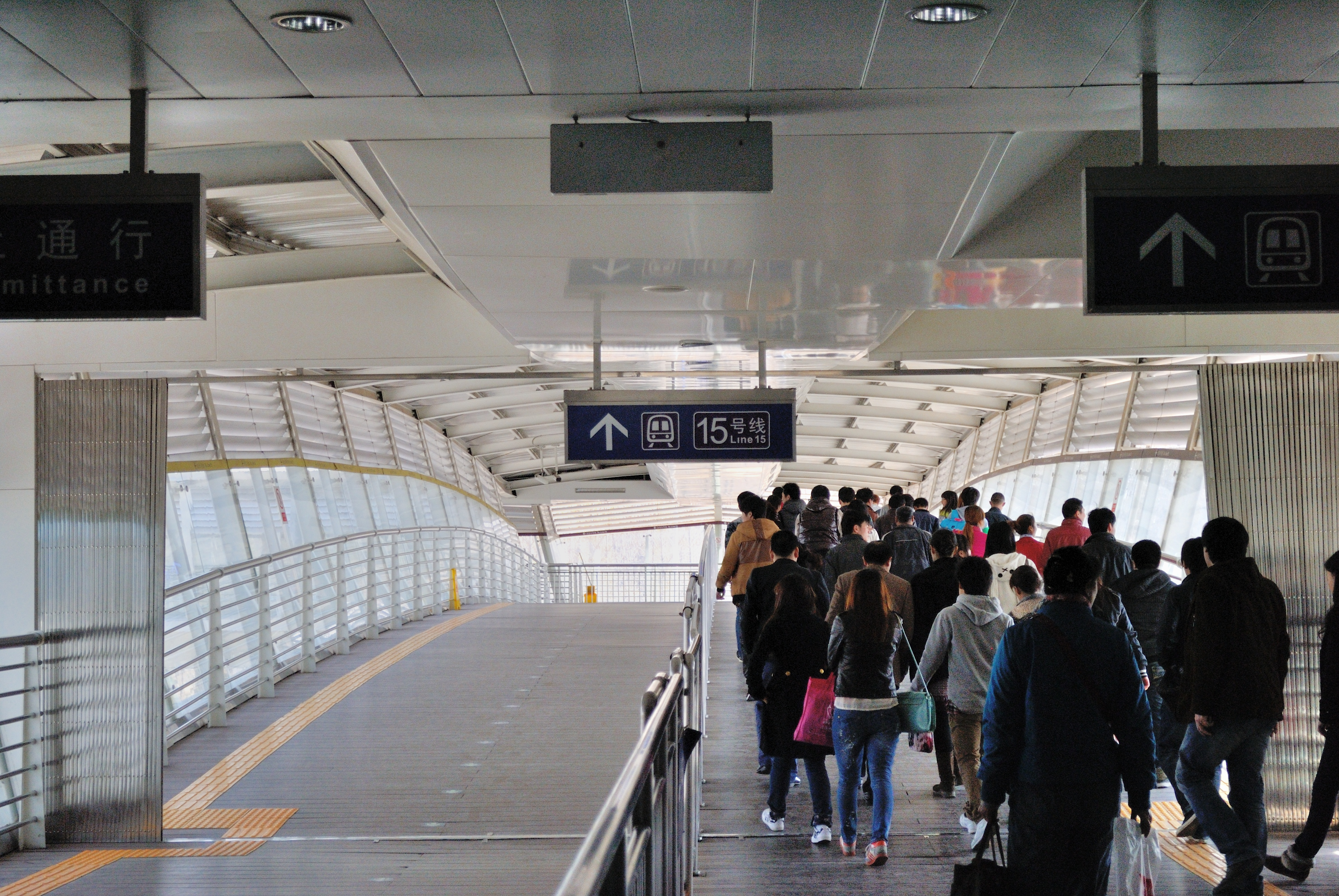
At Wangjing West, in the former interchange passage between Lines 13 and 15, passengers transferring must pass through a lengthy transfer corridor that includes a pedestrian footbridge (closed January 2026; passengers now have to transfer via the newly opened Line 17 concourse).

Interchange stations that permit transfers across two or more subway lines receive heavy traffic passenger flow. The older interchange stations are known for lengthy transfer corridors and slow transfers during peak hours. The average transfer distance at older interchange stations is 128 m (420 ft) The transfer between Lines 2 and 13 at Xizhimen once required 15 minutes to complete during rush hours. In 2011, this station was rebuilt to reduce the transfer distance to about 170 m (560 ft) long. There are plans to rebuild other interchange stations such as Dongzhimen.

In newer interchange stations, which are designed to permit more efficient transfers, the average transfer distance is 63 m (207 ft). Many of the newer interchange stations including Guogongzhuang (Lines 9 and Fangshan), Nanluoguxiang (Lines 8 and 6), Zhuxinzhuang (Changping and Line 8), Beijing West railway station (Lines 9 and 7), National Library (Lines 9 and 4), Yancun East (Fangshan Line and Yanfang Line) feature cross platform transfers. Nevertheless, longer transfer corridors must still be used when the alignment of the lines do not permit cross-platform transfer. The transfer corridors between Lines 1 and 9 at the Military Museum, which opened on December 23, 2013, are 160 m (520 ft) in one direction and just under 300 m (980 ft) in the other.

== Safety ==
=== Security check ===
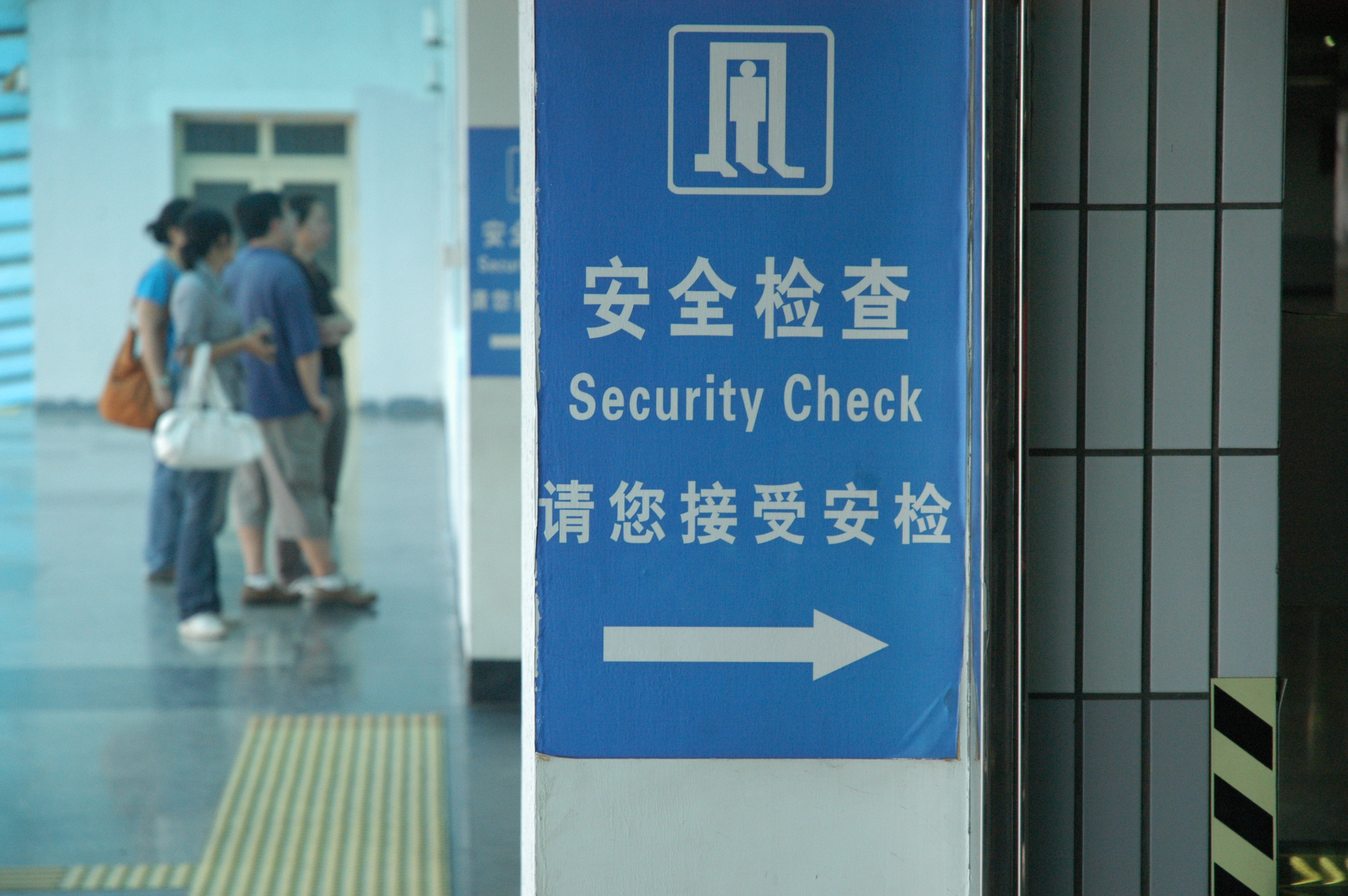
Since the 2008 Olympics, security checks of riders and bags have become mandatory on the Beijing Subway.

To ensure public safety during the 2008 Summer Olympic and Paralympic Games, the subway initiated a three-month heightened security program from June 29 to September 20, 2008. Riders were subject to searches of their persons and belongings at all stations by security inspectors using metal detectors, X-ray machines and sniffer dogs. Items banned from public transportation such as "guns, ammunition, knives, explosives, flammable and radioactive materials, and toxic chemicals" were subject to confiscation. The security program was reinstituted during the 2009 New Year Holiday and has since been made permanent through regulations enacted in February 2009.

=== Accidents and incidents ===
The subway was plagued by numerous accidents in its early years, including a fire in 1969 that killed six people and injured over 200. But its operations have improved dramatically and there have been few reported accidents in recent years. Most of the reported fatalities on the subway are the result of suicides. Authorities have responded by installing doors on platforms of newer lines.

- On October 8, 2003, the collapse of steel beams at the construction site of Line 5's Chongwenmen station killed three workers and injured one.
- On March 29, 2007, the construction site at the Suzhoujie station on Line 10 collapsed, burying six workers.
- On June 6, 2008, prior to the opening of Line 10, a worker was crushed to death inside an escalator in Zhichunlu station when an intern turned on the moving staircase.
- On July 14, 2010, two workers were killed and eight were injured at the construction site of Line 15's Shunyi station when the steel support structure collapsed on them.
- On September 17, 2010, Line 9 tunnels under construction beneath Yuyuantan Lake were flooded, killing one worker. A city official who oversaw waterworks contracts at the site was convicted of corruption and given a death sentence with reprieve.
- On June 1, 2011, one worker was killed when a section of Line 6 under construction in Xicheng District near Ping'anli collapsed.
- On July 5, 2011, an escalator collapsed at Beijing Zoo Station, killing one 13-year-old boy and injuring 28.
- On July 19, 2012, a man was fatally shot at Hujialou station by a sniper from the Beijing Special Weapons and Tactics Unit after taking a subway worker hostage.
- On May 4, 2013, a train derailed when it overran a section of track on Line 4. The section was not open to the public and was undergoing testing. There were no injuries.
- On November 6, 2014, a woman was killed when she tried to board the train at Huixinxijie Nankou station on Beijing Subway's Line 5. She became trapped between the train door and the platform edge door and was crushed to death by the departing train. The accident happened on the second day of APEC China 2014 meetings in the city during which the municipal government has banned cars from the roads on alternate days to ease congestion and reduce pollution during the summit – measures which the capital's transport authorities have estimated would lead to an extra one million passengers on the subway every day.
- On March 26, 2015, a Yizhuang line train was testing when it derailed around Taihu Depot. No passengers were on board and the driver faced leg injuries.
- On January 1, 2018, a Xijiao line train derailed around Fragrant Hills station. There were no injuries. Fragrant Hills station was temporarily closed until March 1, 2018.
- On December 14, 2023, two trains on the Changping line collided between Xi'erqi station and Life Science Park station, causing one of the carriages to break apart and injuring over 500 passengers on board.

== Subway culture ==
=== Logo ===
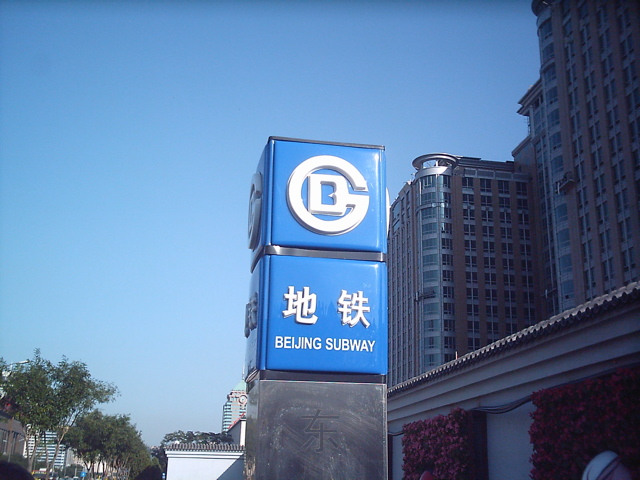
The logo of the Beijing Subway contains the subway's abbreviation, B.G.D.

The subway's logo, a capital letter "G" encircling a capital letter "D" with the letter "B" silhouetted inside the letter D, was designed by Zhang Lide, a subway employee, and officially designated in April 1984. The letters B, G, and D form the pinyin abbreviation for "北京高速电车" (pinyin: Běijīng gāosù diànchē; lit. 'Beijing high-speed electric carriage').

=== Subway Culture Park ===
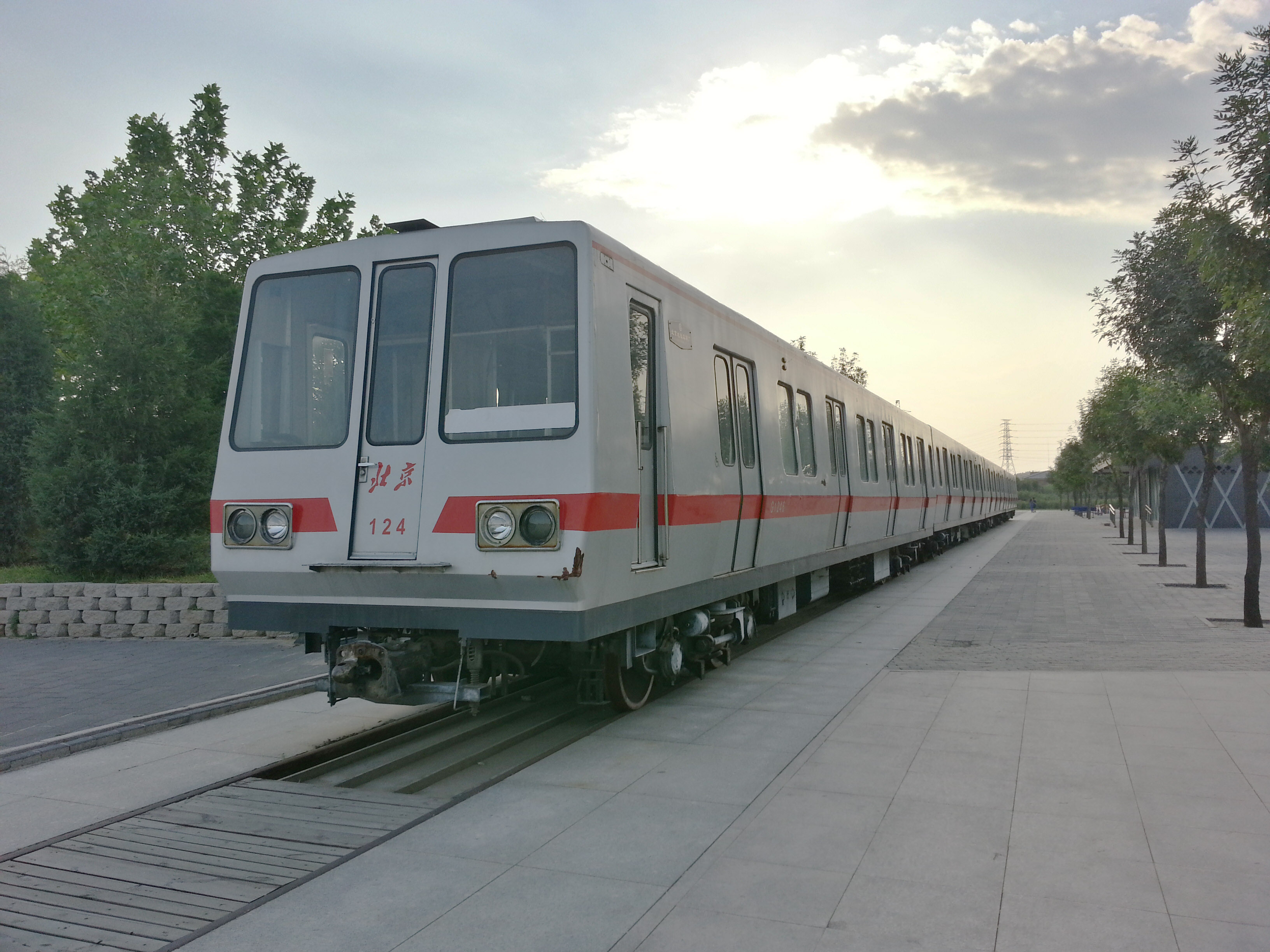
A decommissioned Line 1 car in the Beijing Subway Culture Park

The Beijing Subway Culture Park, located near Xihongmen in Daxing District, opened in 2010 to commemorate the 40-year history of the Beijing Subway. The 19 ha (47 acres) park was built using dirt and debris removed from the construction of the Daxing line and contains old rolling stock, sculpture, and informational displays. Admission to the park is free.

== Beijing Suburban Railway ==
The Beijing Suburban Railway, a suburban commuter train service, is managed separately from the Beijing Subway. The two systems, although complementary, are not related to each other operationally. Beijing Suburban Railway is operated by the China Railway Beijing Group.

There are 4 suburban railway lines currently in operation: Line S2, Sub-Central line, Huairou–Miyun line and Tongmi line.

== See also ==
- List of Beijing Subway stations
- Transport in Beijing
- List of metro systems
- Urban rail transit in China
