= Terminal 3 station =

Terminal 3 station can refer to:

- Terminal 3 station (Beijing Subway), a subway station on Capital Airport Express of Beijing Subway, China.
- Terminal 3 station (Zhengzhou Metro), an unopened station on Chengjiao Line of Zhengzhou Metro, Henan Province, China.
- Airport Terminal 3 (Dubai Metro), a metro station in Dubai, United Arab Emirates.
- Terminal 3 station, an automated people mover station on the Terminal Link at Toronto Pearson International Airport, Toronto, Canada.
