= Terminal 3 =

Terminal 3 may refer to:

== Art, entertainment, and media ==
- "Terminal 3" (song), the Irish entry in the Eurovision Song Contest 1984

== Transportation ==
=== Airport terminals ===
- Beijing Capital International Airport Terminal 3 in China
- Ben Gurion Airport Terminal 3 the main airport in Israel
- Cairo International Airport Terminal 3 in Egypt
- Cancún International Airport Terminal 3 in Mexico
- Changi Airport Terminal 3 in Singapore
- Dubai International Terminal 3 in the United Arab Emirates
- Frankfurt Airport Terminal 3 in Germany
- Heathrow Terminal 3 in London, United Kingdom
- Indira Gandhi International Airport Terminal 3 in Delhi, India
- Málaga Airport Terminal 3 in Spain
- Manchester Airport Terminal 3 in the United Kingdom
- McCarran International Airport Terminal 3 in Las Vegas, Nevada
- Ninoy Aquino International Airport Terminal 3 serving Manila, Philippines
- Pearson Airport Terminal 3 at Pearson International Airport in Toronto, Canada
- Phoenix Sky Harbor International Airport Terminal 3 in Arizona, United States
- Soekarno–Hatta International Airport Terminal 3 serving Jakarta, Indonesia
- Sydney Airport Terminal 3 in Australia

=== Seaport terminals ===
- Port of Richmond Terminal 3, a seaport in California, United States

=== Subway and train stations ===
- 3 Hao Hangzhanlou (Terminal 3) station on the Airport Express of the Beijing Subway, serving Beijing Capital Airport Terminal 3
- Terminal 3 station, a stop on the Terminal Link automated people mover at Toronto Pearson International Airport
