= Line 20 (Beijing Subway) =

Rapid transit line under construction in Beijing

- 20

Overview
- Other name: M20, R4 (planned name)
- Status: Under construction
- Termini: Guanzhuang Lu Xikou; Yanjing Qiao
- Stations: 5 (Phase 1)

Service
- Type: Rapid transit
- System: Beijing Subway
- Depot: Zhuangtoucun
- Rolling stock: 4-car Type A

History
- Opened: 2030 (Phase 1)

Technical
- Line length: 20.78 km
- Character: Underground and elevated
- Track gauge: 1,435 mm (4 ft 8 1/2 in)

Line 20 of the Beijing Subway (Chinese: 北京地铁20号线; pinyin: běijīng dìtiě èrshí hàoxiàn), or Line R4 (Chinese: 北京地铁R4线; pinyin: běijīng dìtiě R sì xiàn) (Note: R stands for Rapid here.) is a rapid transit line under construction in Beijing.

The first phase of Line 20 will be 20.78 km in length with 5 stations. All stations except Linhe are underground stations. It runs from Guanzhuang Lu Xikou on Line 3 in Chaoyang District to Yanjing Qiao in Shunyi District.

It is expected to open in 2030. There will be through service between Line 3 and Line 20.

== Stations (Phase 1) ==
Station Name		Connections
English	Chinese	Connections
Guanzhuang Lu Xikou	管庄路西口	Through service: 3 (U/C)
Terminal 3	3号航站楼	Capital Airport
Zhongde Chanyeyuan	中德产业园	
Linhe	临河	
Yanjing Qiao	燕京桥	

== History ==
In 2019, Liu Xuesong, representative of the Beijing Municipal People's Congress and general manager of Capital Airport Holding, suggested building the northern section of the line in advance.

On November 10, 2020, the Shunyi Branch of the Beijing Municipal Planning and Natural Resources Commission released a notice to advance the preliminary work of rail transit, including the Shunyi section of Line 20.

According to the information released on January 11, 2022, the first phase of the line is included in the "Beijing Rail Transit Phase III Construction Plan". On 8 July 2022, the EIA of Phase III Plan announced that it will be a 19 km (12 mi) line, with 4 stations from Guanzhuang Lu Xikou station in Chaoyang District to Linhe station in Shunyi District.

On 17 June 2024, Beijing Infrastructure Investment published their first EIA analysis, confirmed that phase 1 of line 20 will have 5 stations. Later on 27 August, their second EIA analysis said that there will introduce through trains with line 3 and line 12, as well as Linhe is an elevated station, the depot is tentatively named Zhuangtoucun Depot that located north of Chengbeijian River.

On 7 January 2025, it was confirmed that the line will use 4-car Type A trains, which is similar to Line 3.

Construction of the Phase 1 North Section (Guanzhuang Lu Xikou Station to Yanjing Qiao Station) started on 2 June 2026.
