= 2 Hao Hangzhanlou (Terminal 2) station =

Beijing Subway station

2 Hao Hangzhanlou (Terminal 2) 2号航站楼
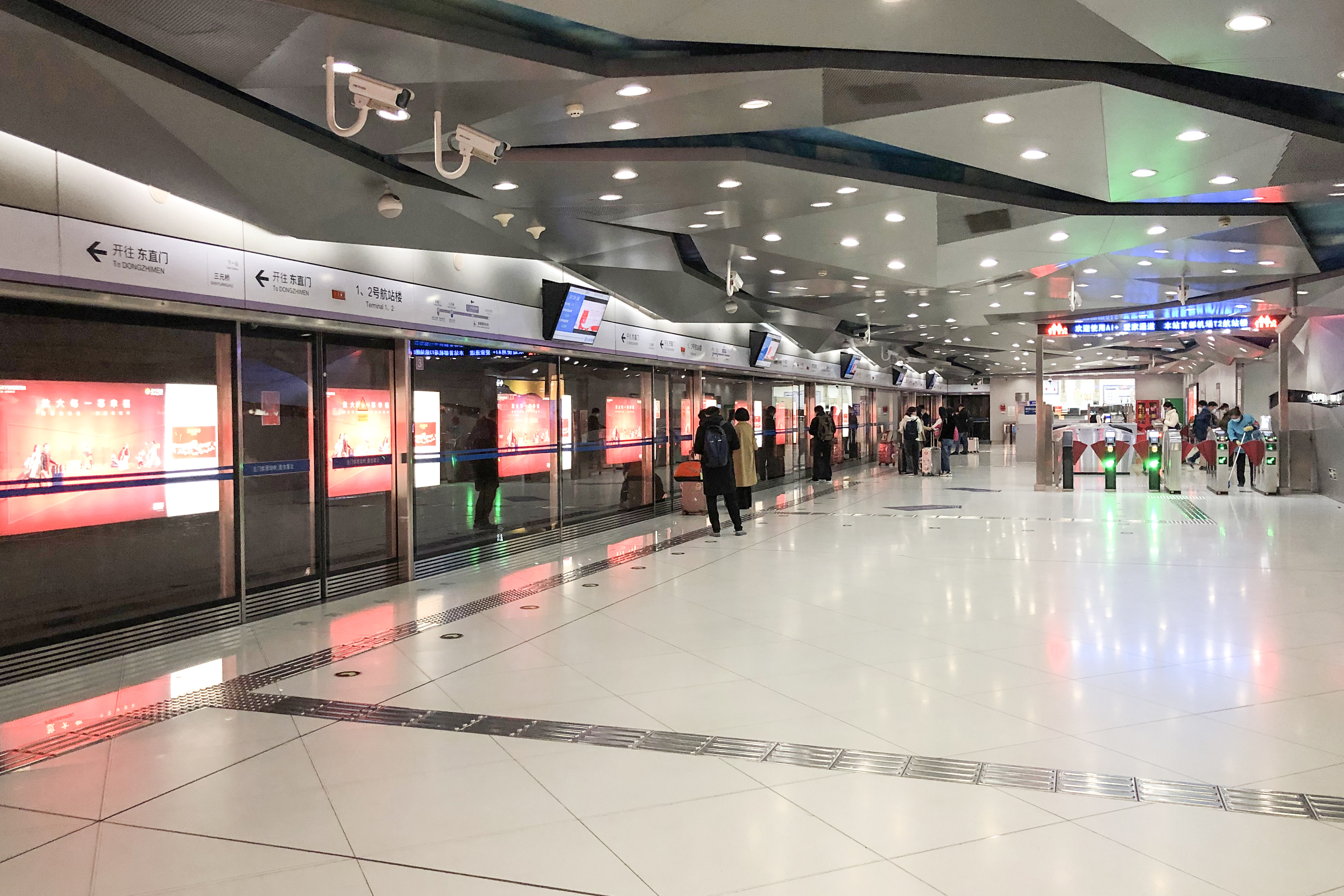
- Platform in October 2020

General information
- Location: Terminal 2, Beijing Capital International Airport; Chaoyang District, Beijing; China
- Coordinates: 40°04′46″N 116°35′34″E
- Operator: Beijing Capital Metro Corp., Ltd.
- Line: Capital Airport Express
- Platforms: 1 (1 side platform)
- Tracks: 1

Construction
- Structure type: Underground
- Accessible: Yes

History
- Opened: July 19, 2008; 18 years ago

Services
Preceding station	Beijing Subway	Following station
Terminal 3 One-way operation	Capital Airport Express	Sanyuanqiao towards Beixinqiao
Location
- Location within Beijing

2 Hao Hangzhanlou (Terminal 2) station (simplified Chinese: 2号航站楼站; traditional Chinese: 2號航站樓站; pinyin: Èrhào Hángzhànlóu zhàn) is a station on the Capital Airport Express of the Beijing Subway, serving Terminal 2 at Beijing Capital International Airport.

It is a terminus station for the Capital Airport Express.

== Station layout ==
The station has an underground single-sided platform.

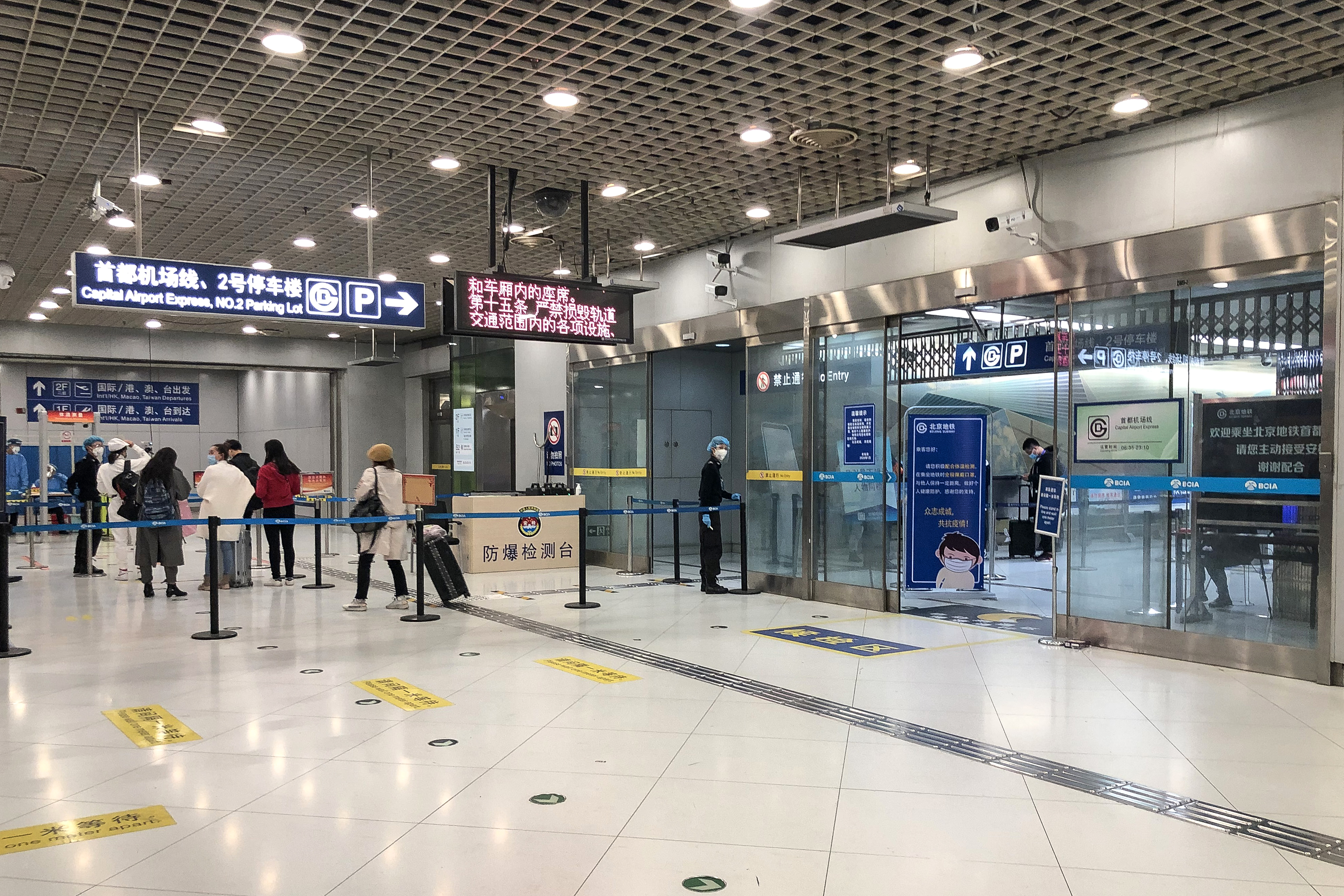
Station entrance on the B2 floor of Terminal 2
