= Sanyuan Qiao station =

Beijing Subway interchange station

Sanyuan Qiao 三元桥
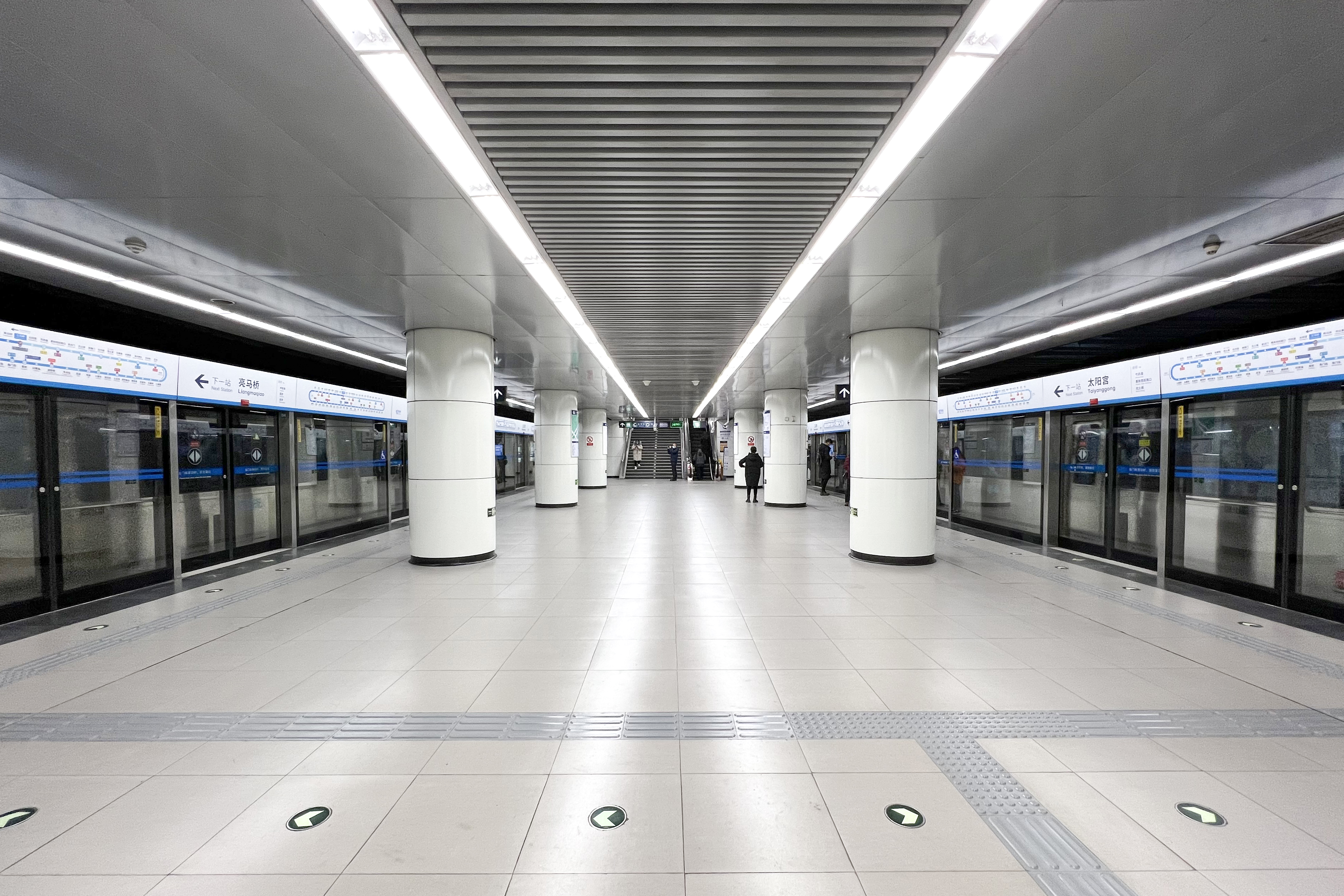
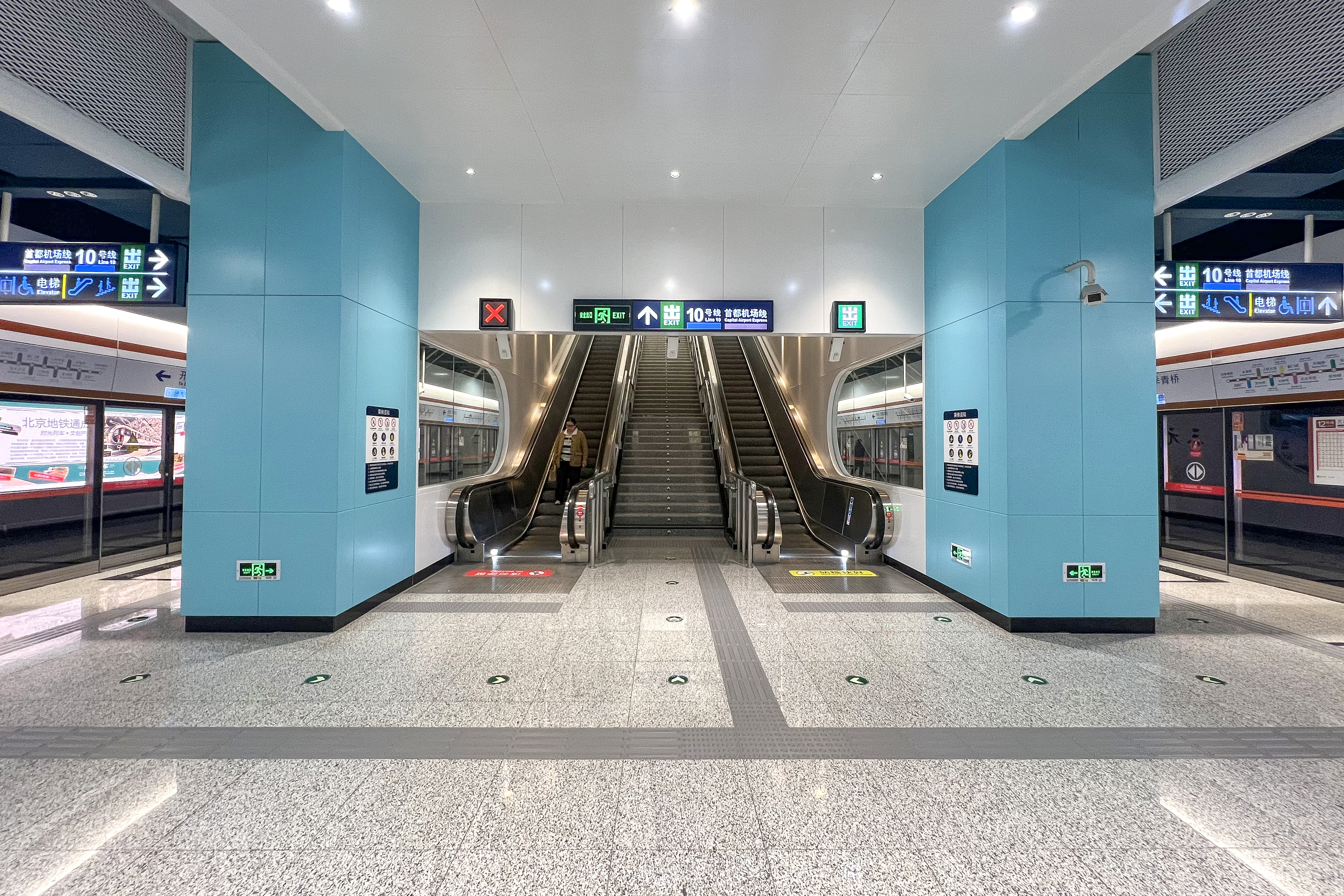
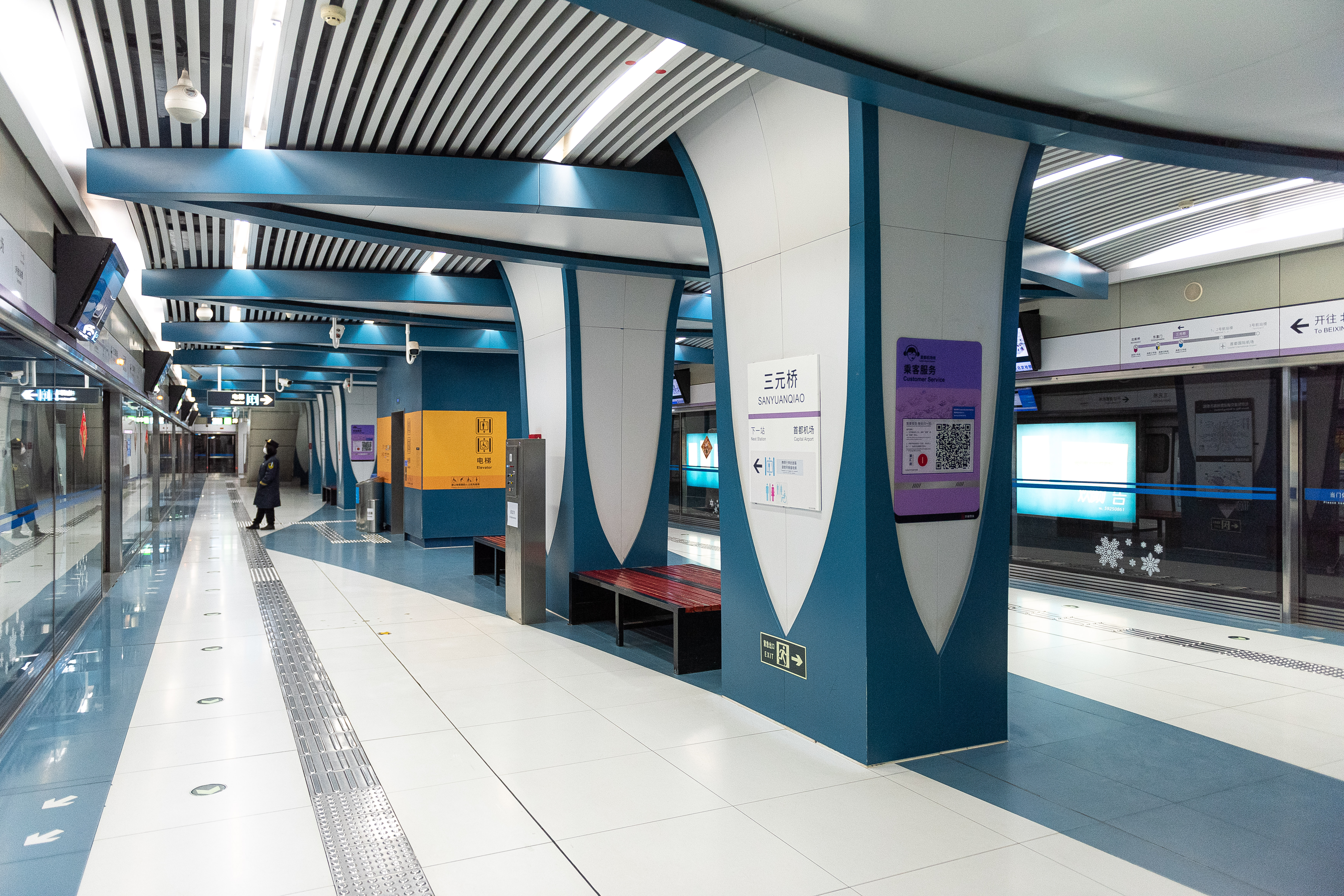
- Line 10 platform Line 12 platform Capital Airport Express platform

General information
- Location: Sanyuan Bridge; Chaoyang District, Beijing; China
- Coordinates: 39°57′41″N 116°27′25″E
- Operator: Beijing Mass Transit Railway Operation Corporation Limited (Line 10); Beijing Capital Metro Corporation Limited (Capital Airport Express)
- Lines: Line 10; Line 12; Capital Airport Express
- Platforms: 4 (2 island platforms)
- Tracks: 4

Construction
- Structure type: Underground
- Accessible: Yes

History
- Opened: Line 10 and Capital Airport Express: July 19, 2008; 18 years ago; Line 12: December 15, 2024; 20 months ago

Services
Preceding station	Beijing Subway	Following station
Taiyanggong outer loop / anticlockwise	Line 10	Liangma Qiao inner loop / clockwise
Xibahe towards Sijiqing Qiao	Line 12	Jiangtaixi towards Dongbabei
Dongzhimen One-way operation	Capital Airport Express	Terminal 3 towards Beijing Capital International Airport
Terminal 2 One-way operation	Capital Airport Express	Dongzhimen towards Beixinqiao
Location
- Location within Beijing

Sanyuan Qiao station (simplified Chinese: 三元桥站; traditional Chinese: 三元橋站; pinyin: Sānyuán Qiáo zhàn) is an interchange station between the Capital Airport Express, Line 10 and Line 12 of the Beijing Subway, located in the Sanyuan Bridge area in Chaoyang District of Beijing.

== Station layout ==
Line 10, Line 12 and Capital Airport Express stations all have underground island platforms.

== Fare areas ==
Due to a different ticketing system on the Capital Airport Express, the fare areas are not connected. A transfer between Line 10 or Line 12 with the Capital Airport Express requires passengers to exit from one line and pay a separate fare for the other line.

== Exits ==
There are 10 exits, lettered A, B, C1, C2, C3, D, E1, E2, F and G. Exits B, D, E1 and E2 are accessible, where Exit B has a stairlift and Exits D, E1 and E2 have elevators.

== Ridership ==
It handled a peak entry and exit traffic of 110,000 people on May 5, 2013.
