= Dongzhimen station =

Beijing Subway interchange station

Coordinates: 39.941626°N 116.435842°E

Dongzhimen 东直门
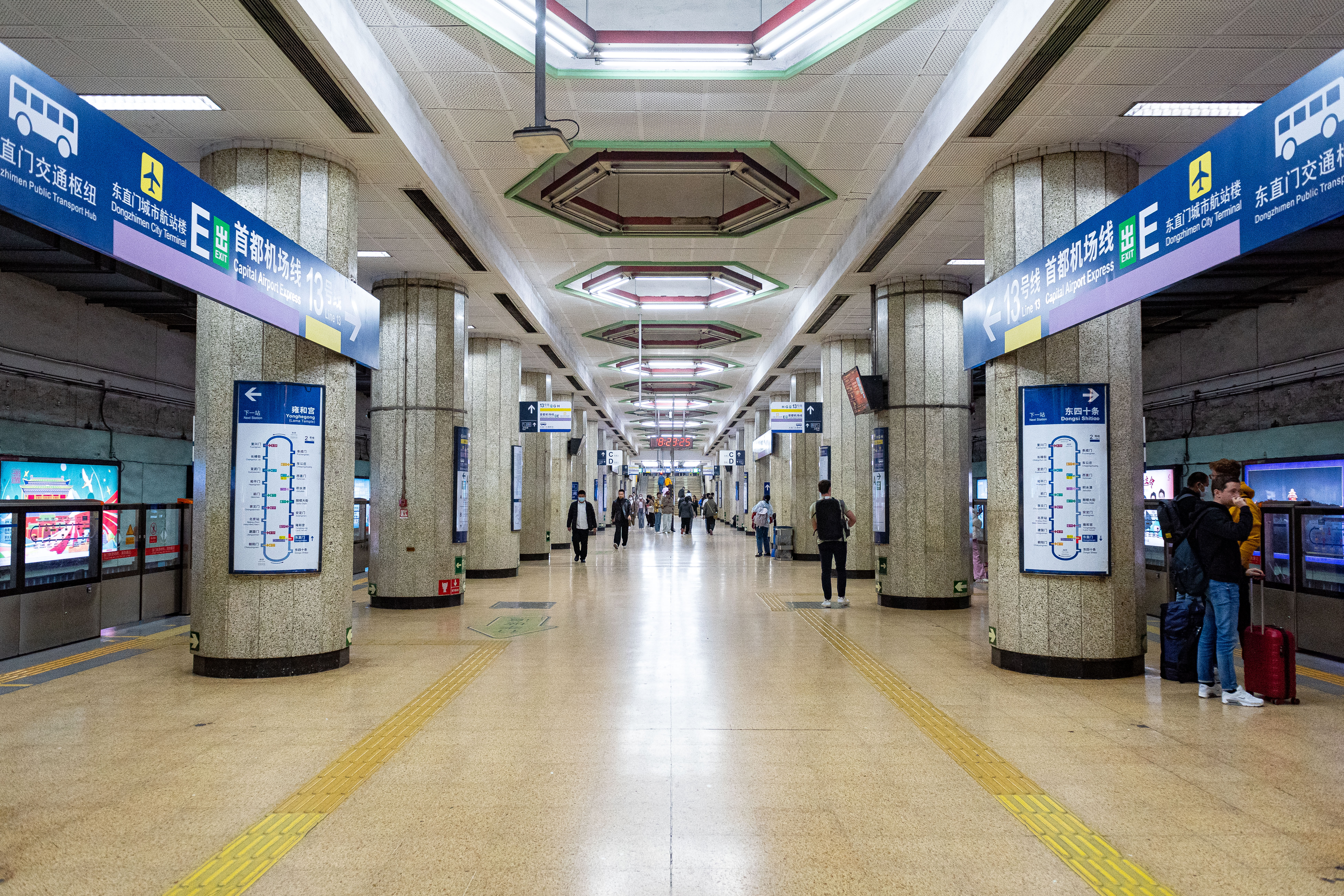
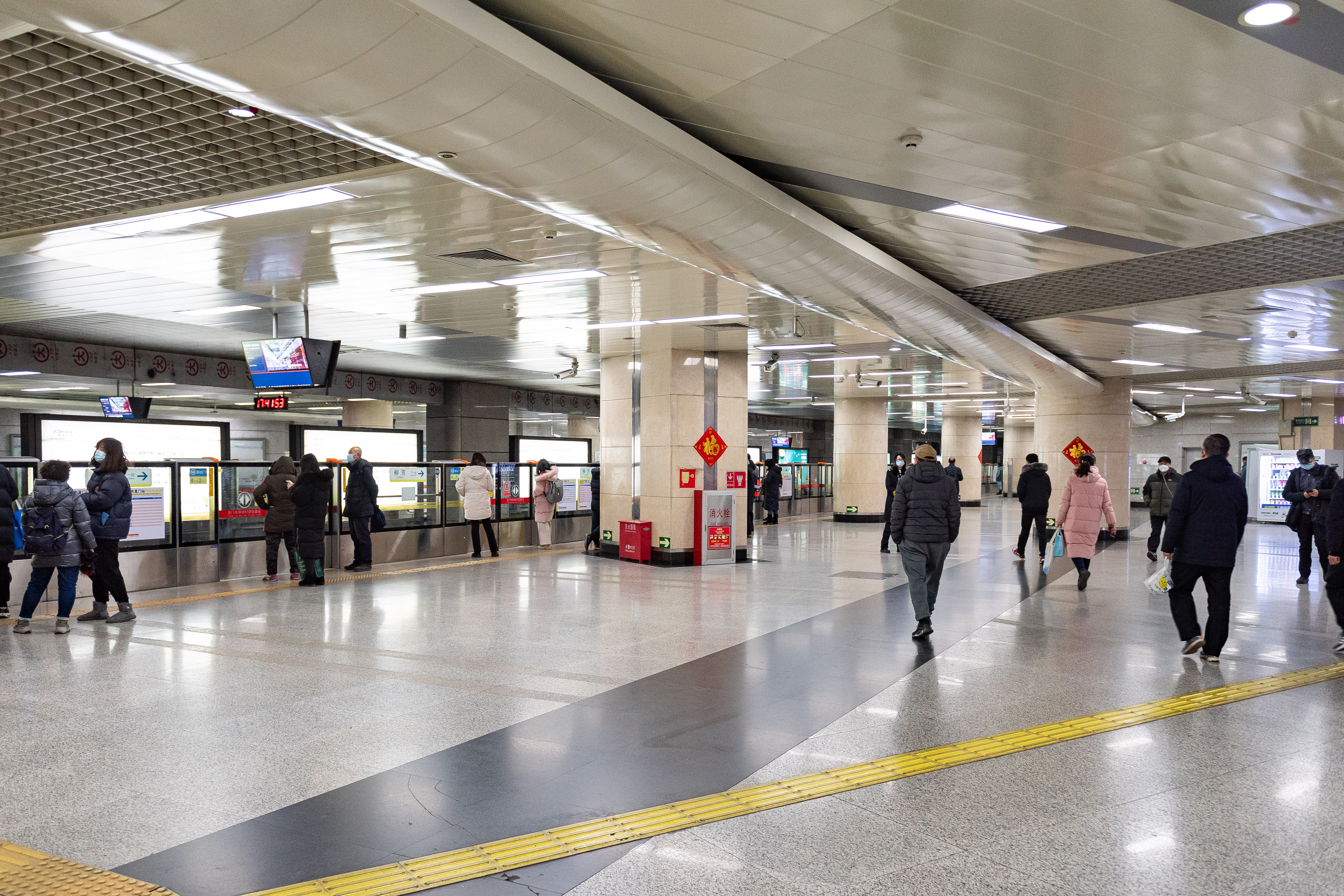
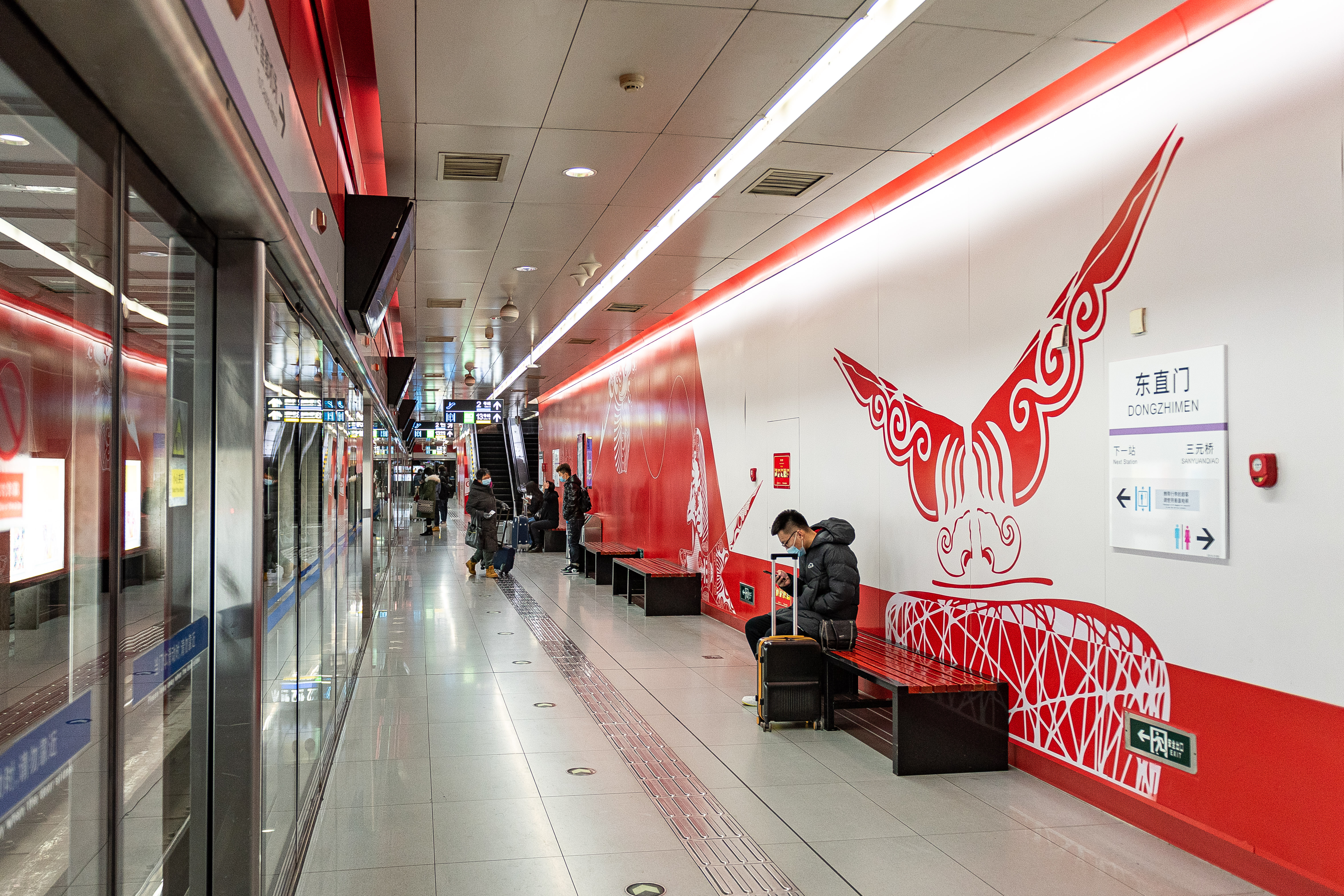
- Line 2 platform Line 13 boarding platform Capital Airport Express eastbound platform

General information
- Location: Dongzhimen, East 2nd Ring Road and Dongzhimen Inner Street and Dongzhimen Outer Street (东直门外大街); Dongcheng District, Beijing; China
- Operator: Beijing Mass Transit Railway Operation Corporation Limited (Line 2 and 13); Beijing Capital Metro Corporation Limited (Capital Airport Express)
- Lines: Line 2; Line 13; Capital Airport Express
- Platforms: 6 (1 island platform and 4 side platforms)
- Tracks: 6

Construction
- Structure type: Underground
- Accessible: Yes

Other information
- Station code: 214 (Line 2); 1316 (Line 13)

History
- Opened: September 20, 1984; 41 years ago (Line 2); January 28, 2003; 23 years ago (Line 13); July 19, 2008; 18 years ago (Capital Airport Express)

Services
Preceding station	Beijing Subway	Following station
Yonghegong Lama Temple outer loop / anticlockwise	Line 2	Dongsi Shitiao inner loop / clockwise
Liufang towards Xizhimen	Line 13	Terminus
Beixinqiao Terminus	Capital Airport Express	Sanyuanqiao towards Beijing Capital International Airport
Location
- Location within Beijing

Dongzhimen station (simplified Chinese: 东直门站; traditional Chinese: 東直門站; pinyin: Dōngzhímén zhàn) is an interchange station for Line 2, Line 13 and the Capital Airport Express of the Beijing Subway.

Dongzhimen is the eastern terminus for Line 13 service. It is also the only underground station on Line 13. There are two side platforms in the Line 13 station. One is for customers to disembark and the other is for customers to get on the train. Stairs and escalators lead to the transfers to Line 2 and the Capital Airport Express.

== Station layout ==
The line 2 station has an underground island platform. The line 13 and Capital Airport Express stations have underground side platforms. The line 13 platforms are located a level under the line 2 platforms, whilst the Capital Airport Express platforms are located a level under the line 13 platforms.

== Exits ==
There are 7 exits, lettered A, B, C, D, E, G, and H. Exits A, G, and H are accessible.

== Gallery ==
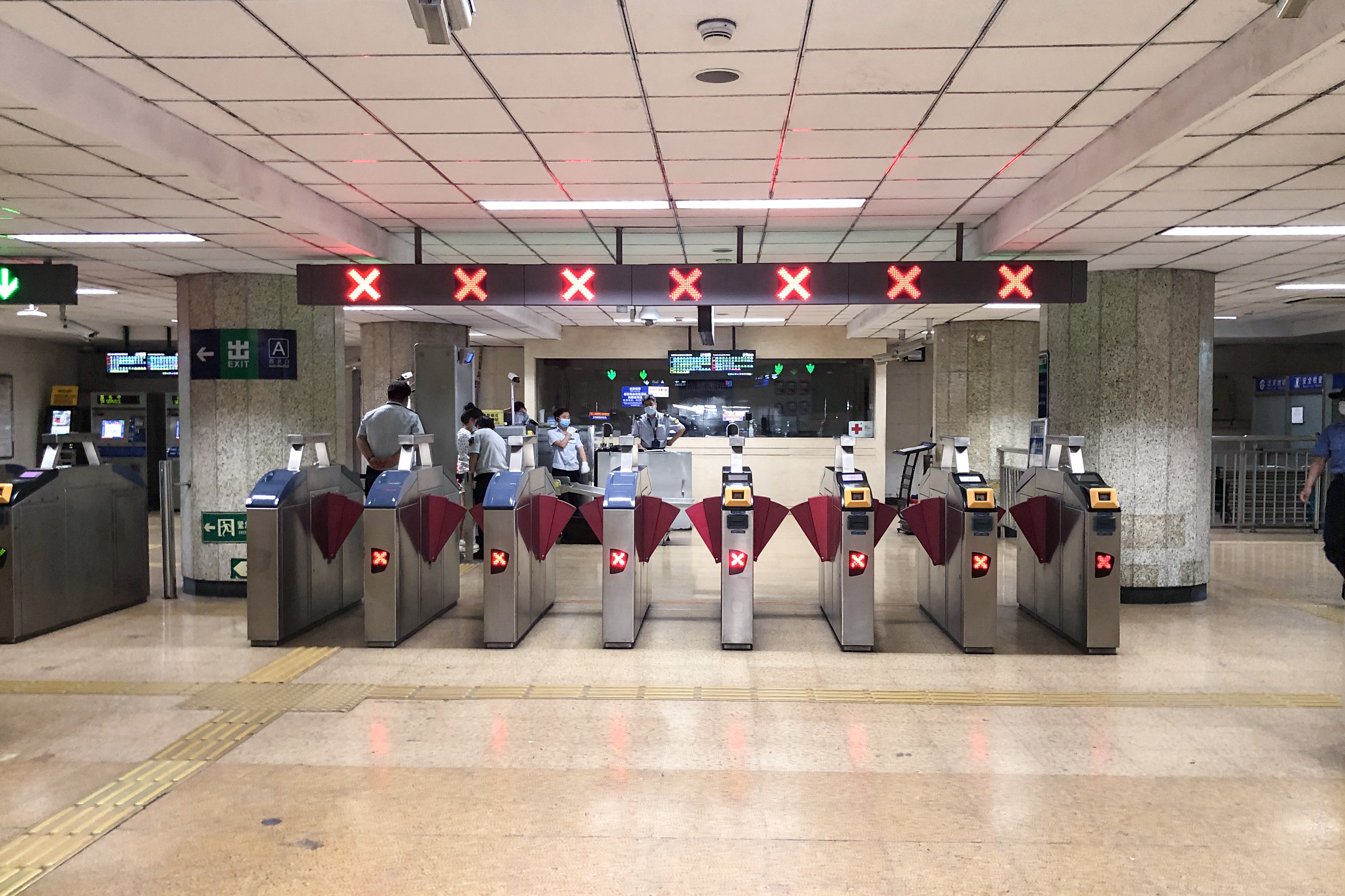
Line 2 north concourse

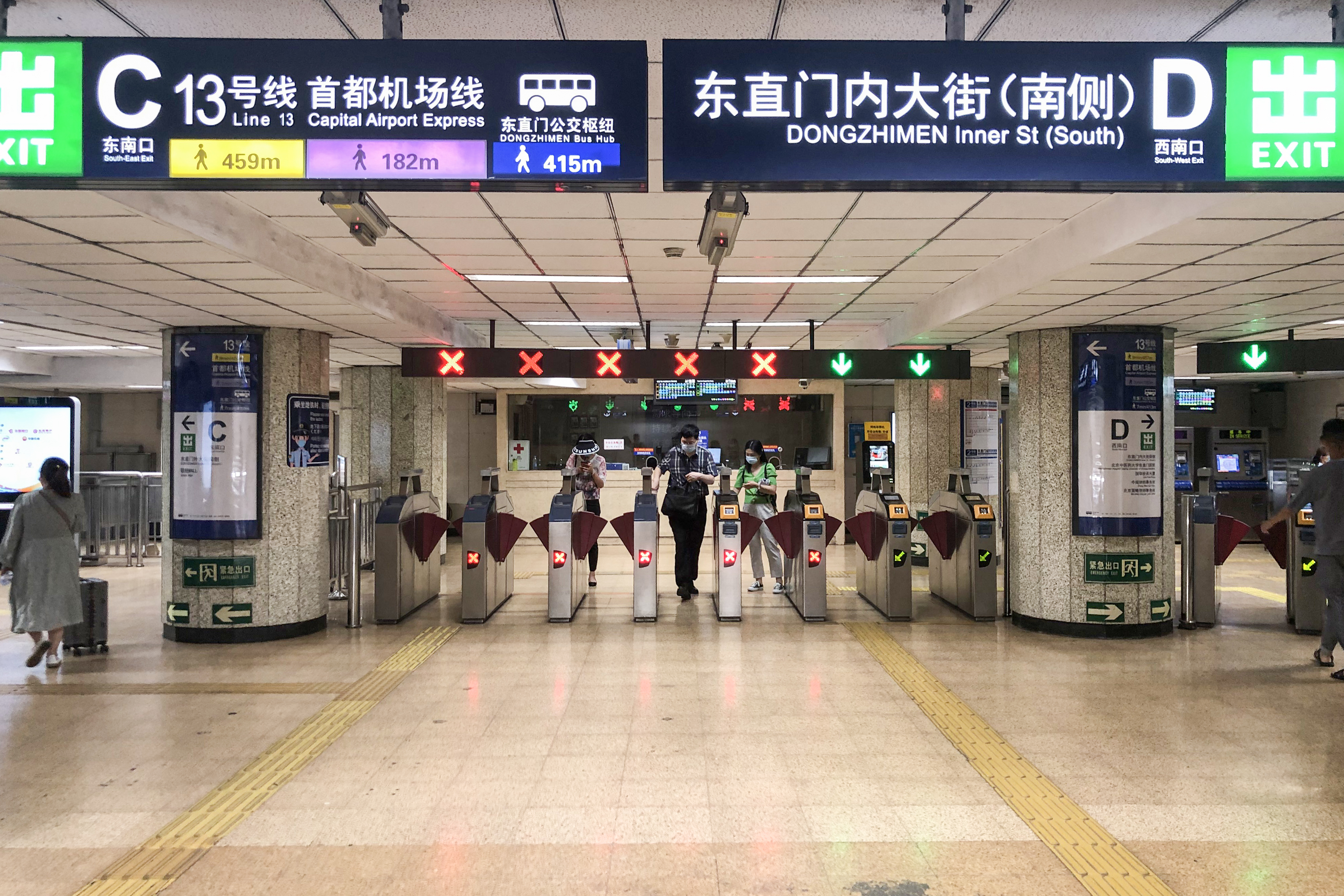
Line 2 south concourse

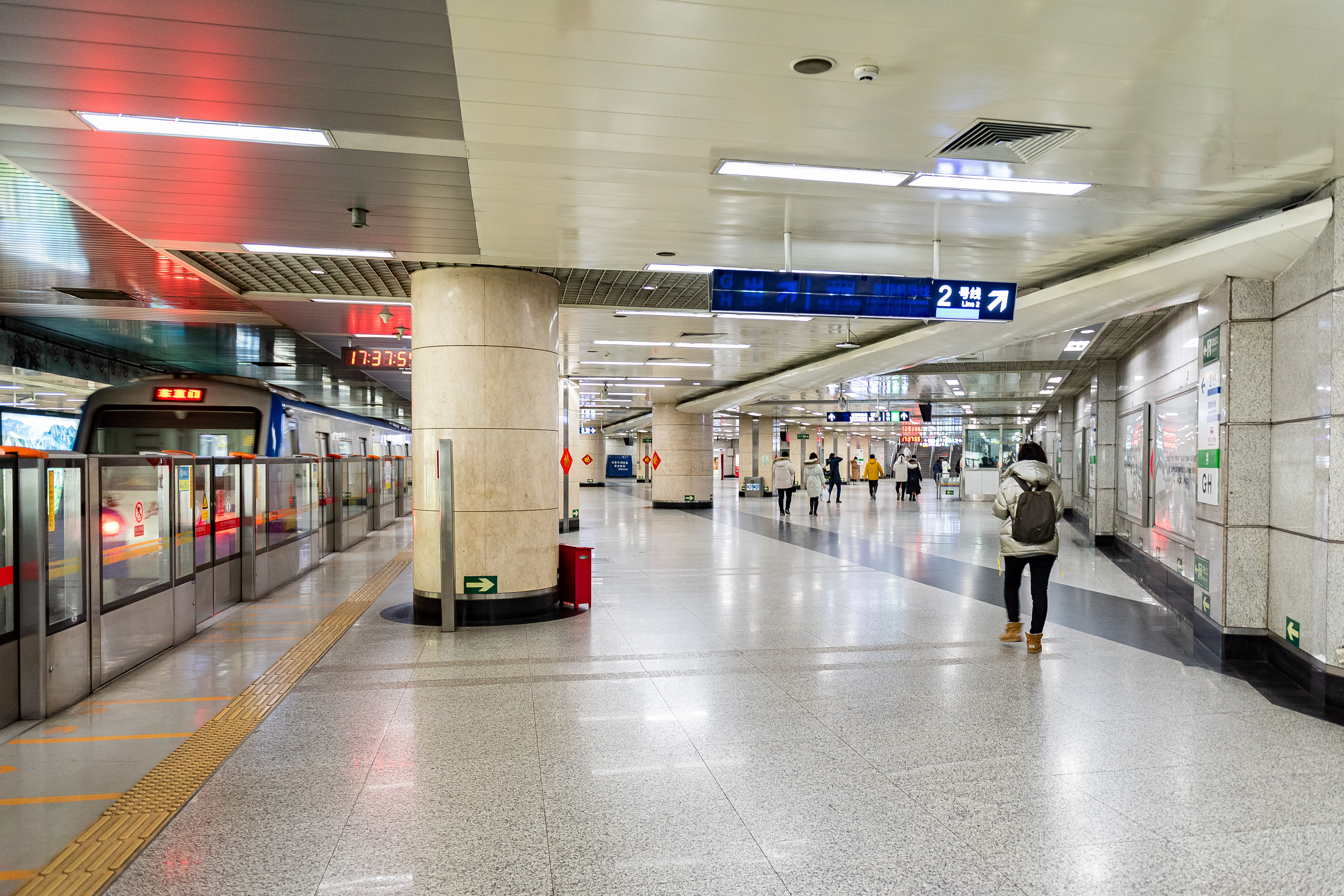
Line 13 alighting platform

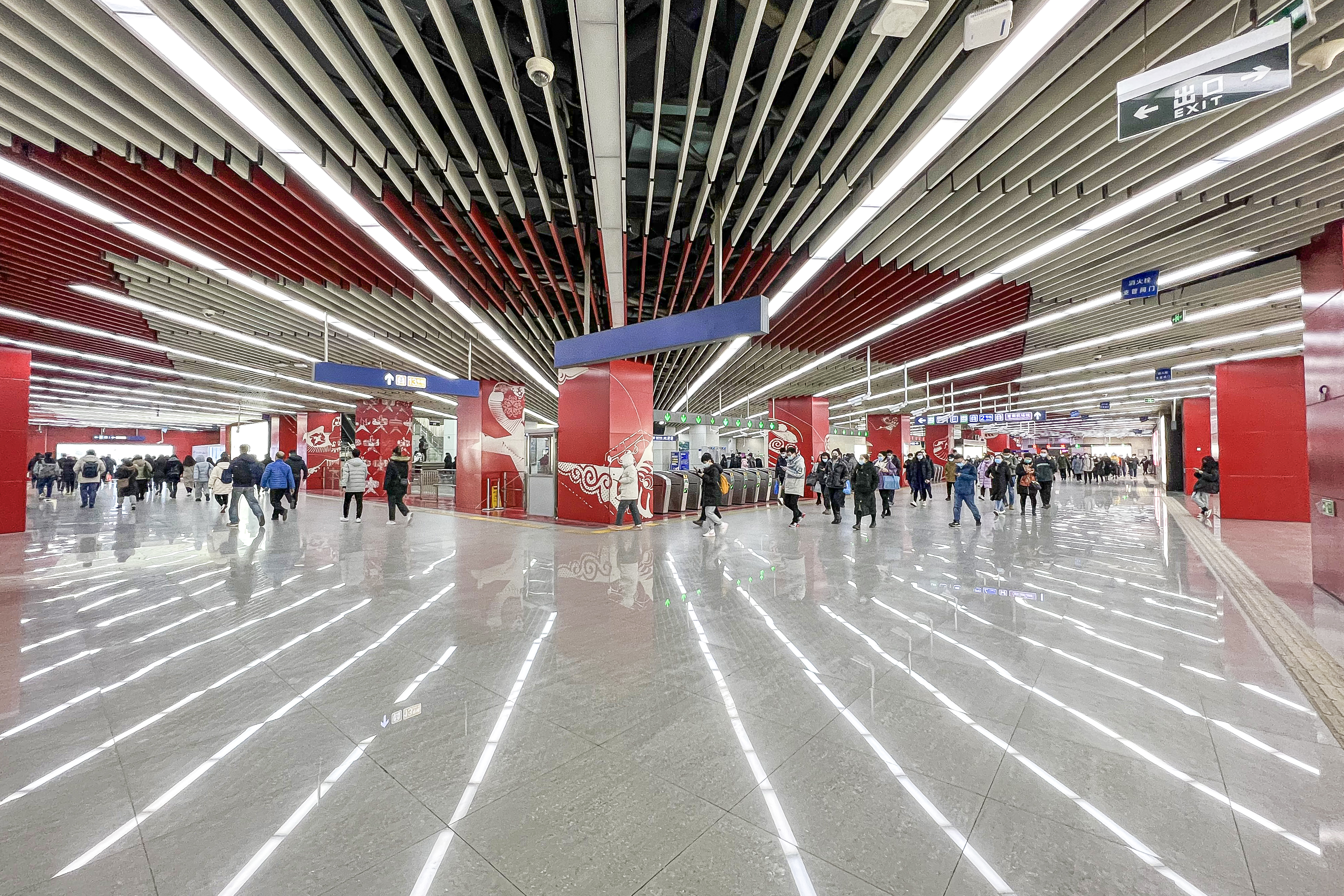
Line 13 concourse (December 2021)

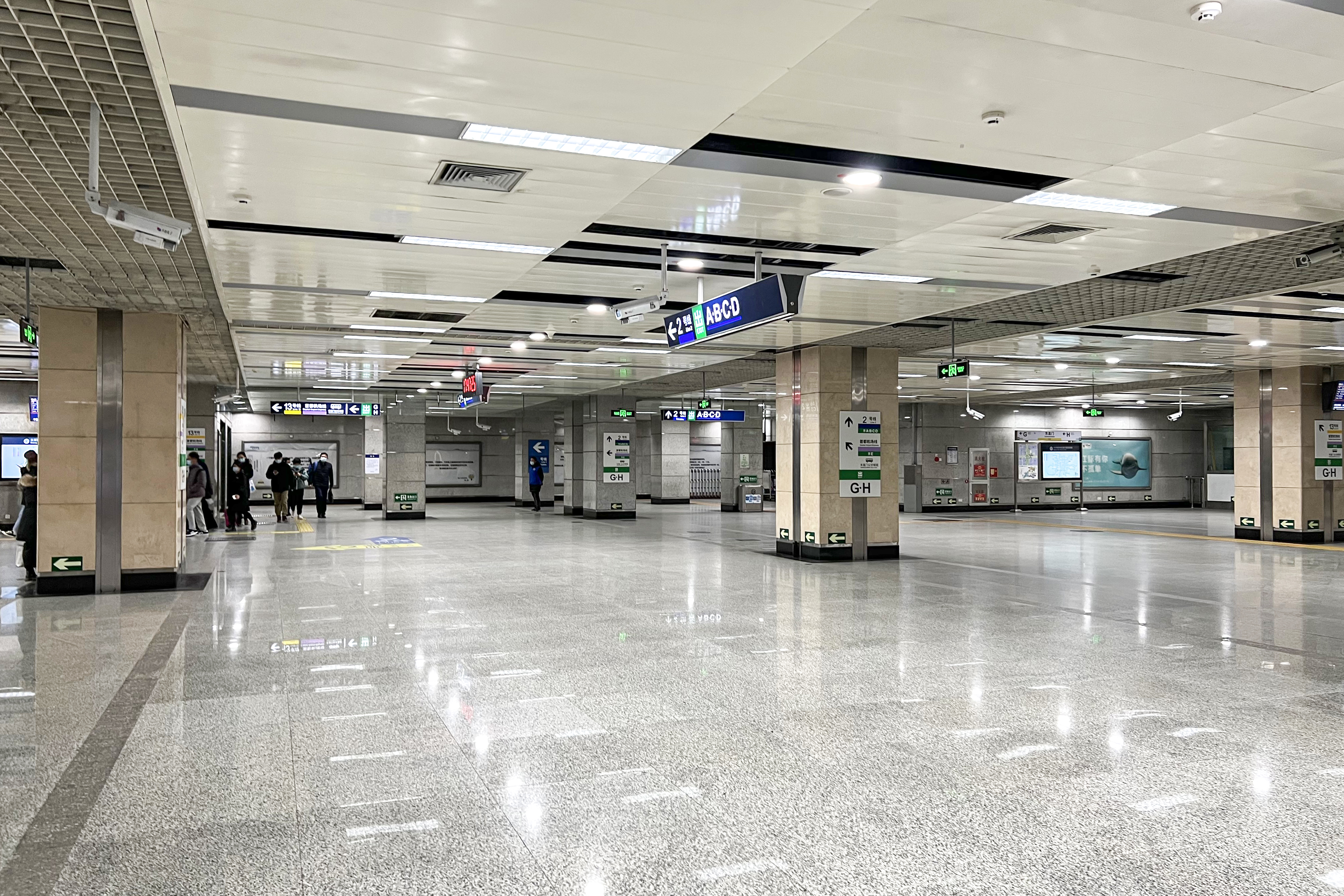
Line 13 alighting platform with transfer corridor to Line 2

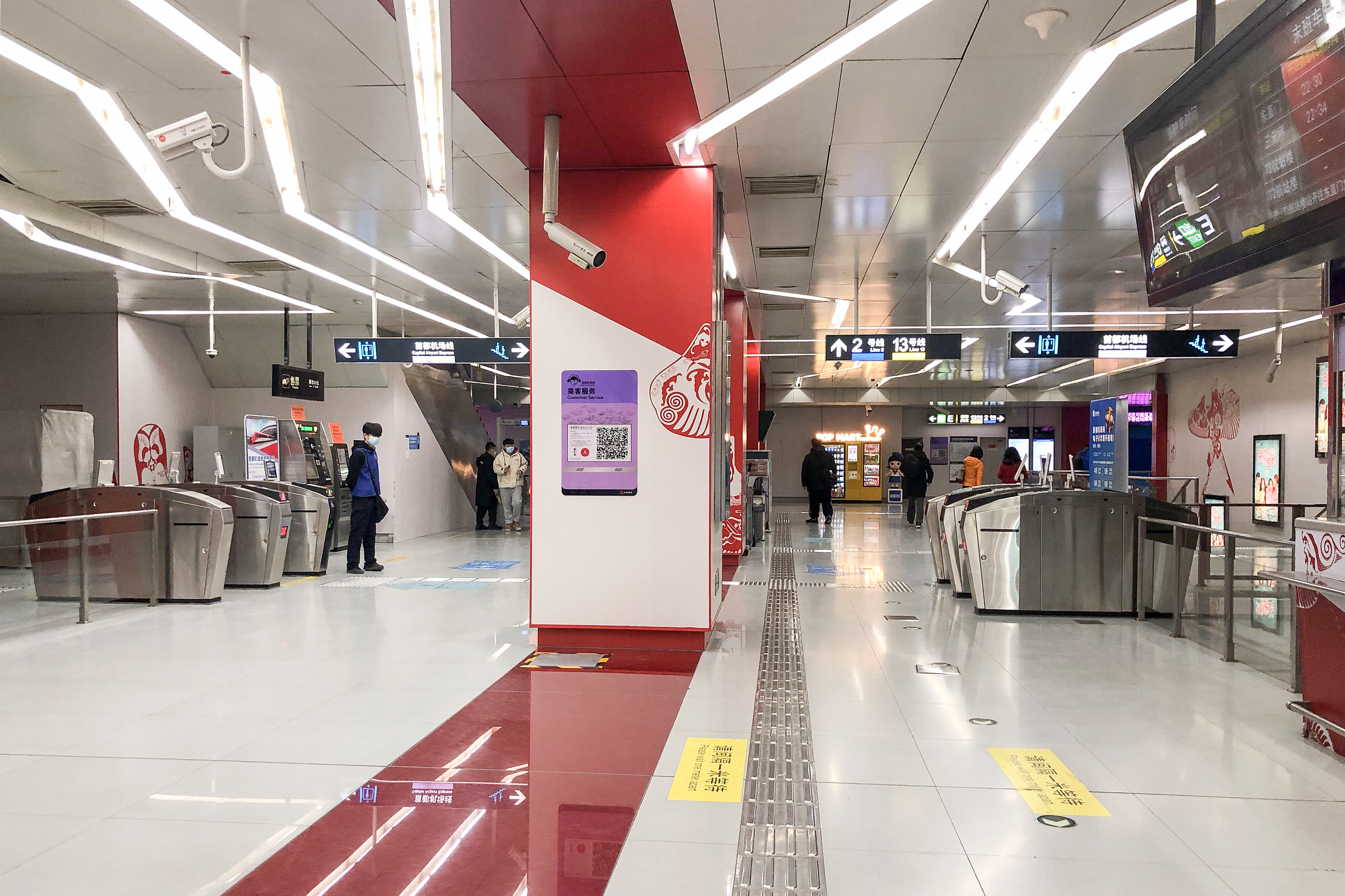
Capital Airport Express upper concourse (December 2021)

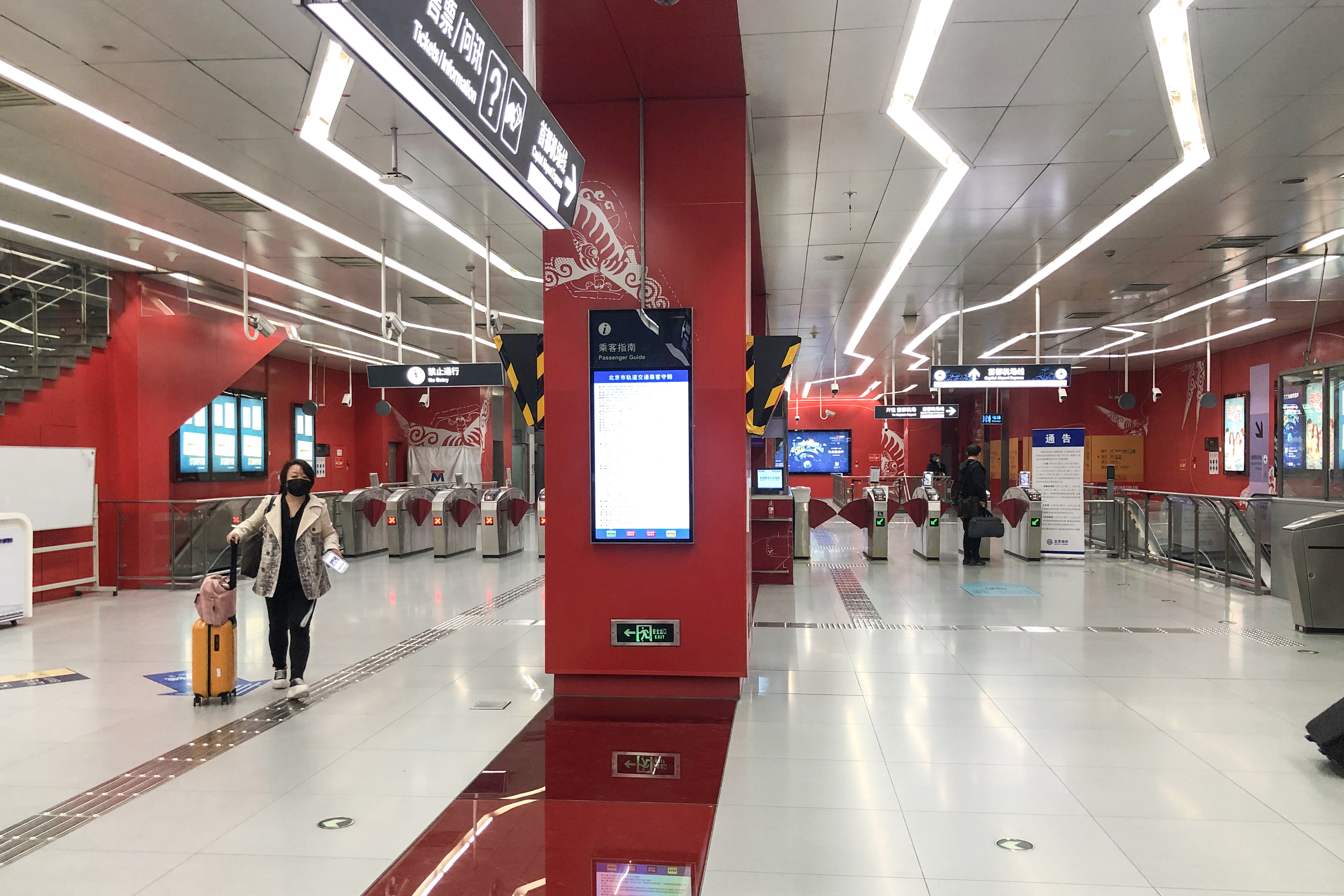
Capital Airport Express concourse (October 2021)

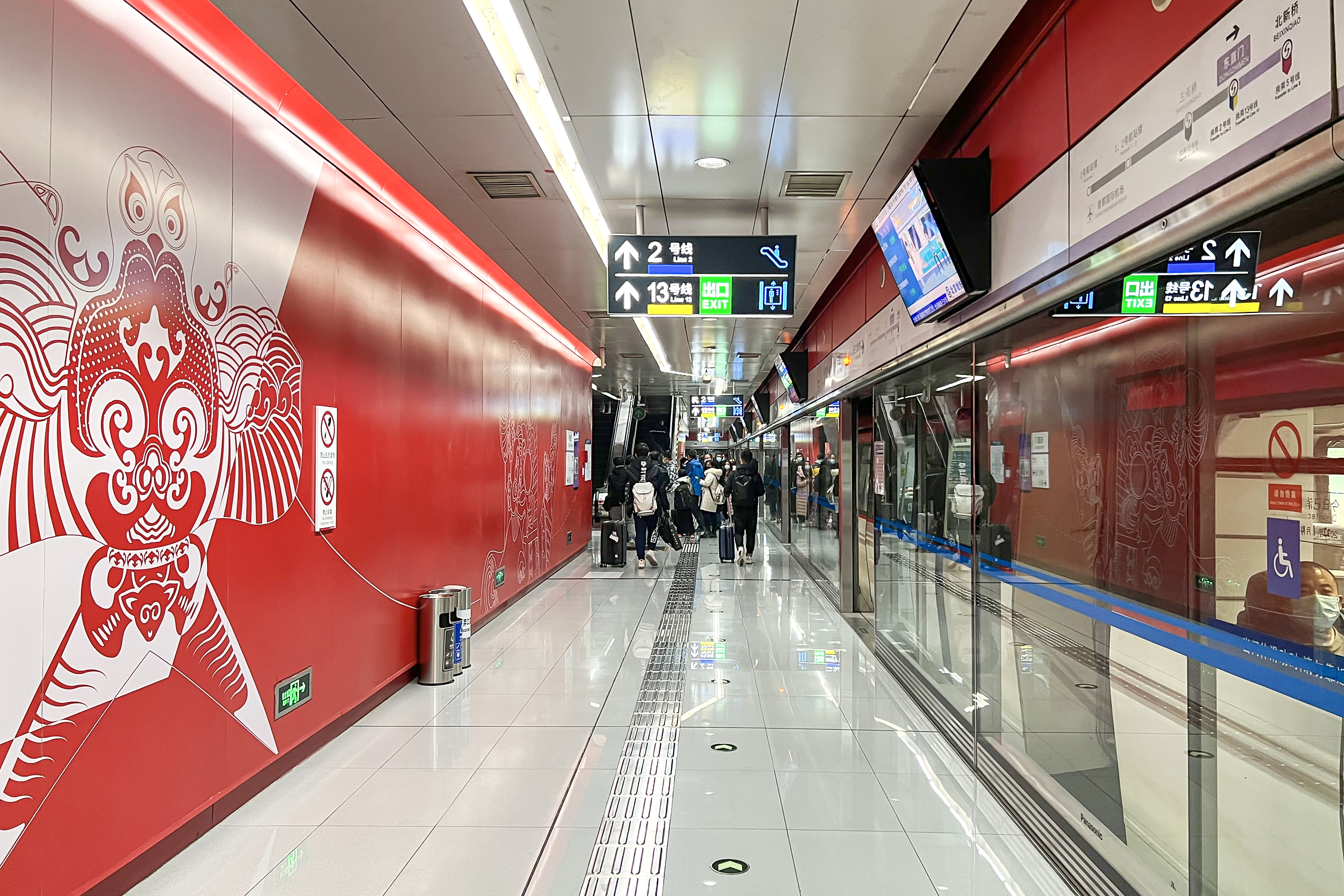
Capital Airport Express westbound platform

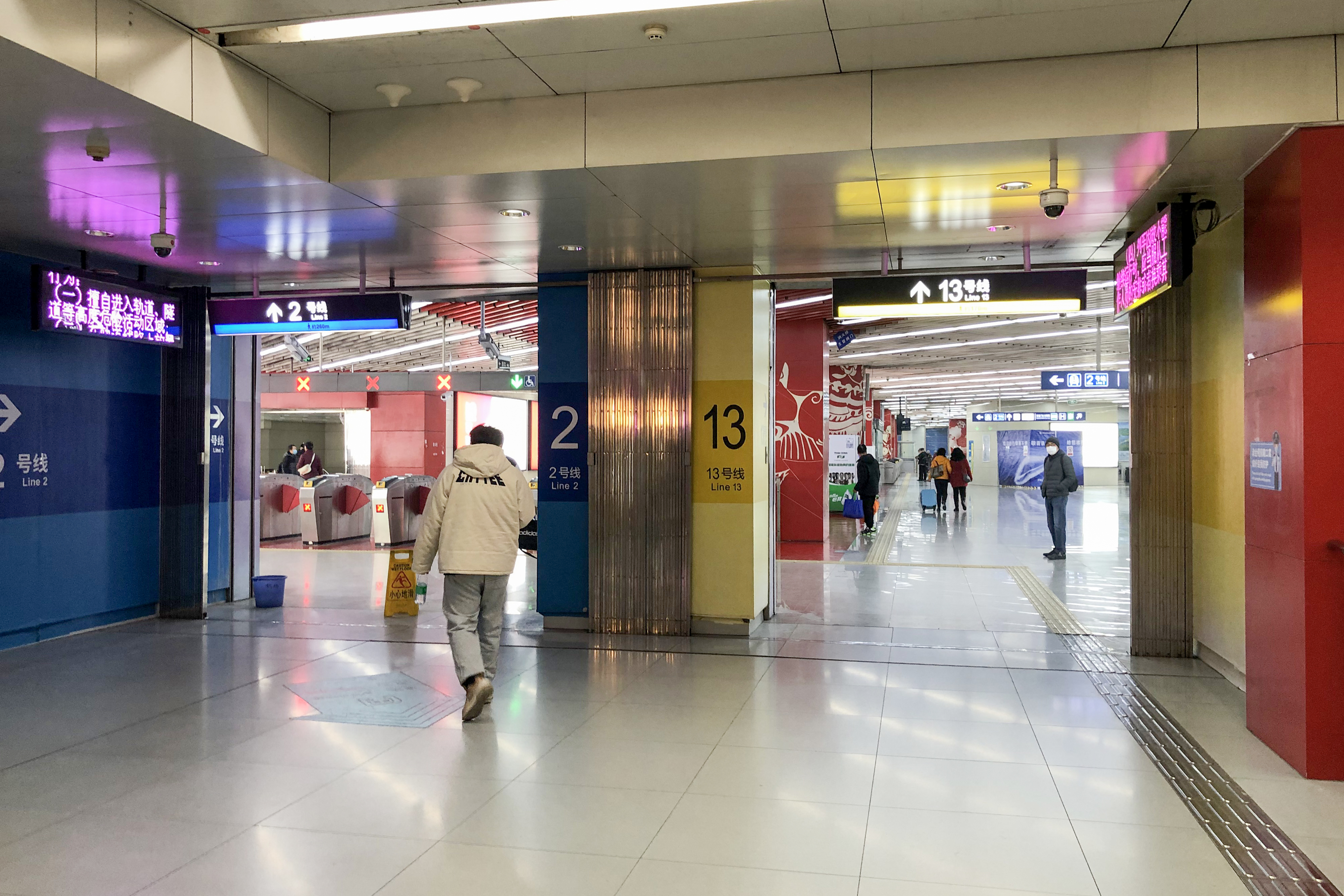
Capital Airport Express upper concourse entrance to conventional lines

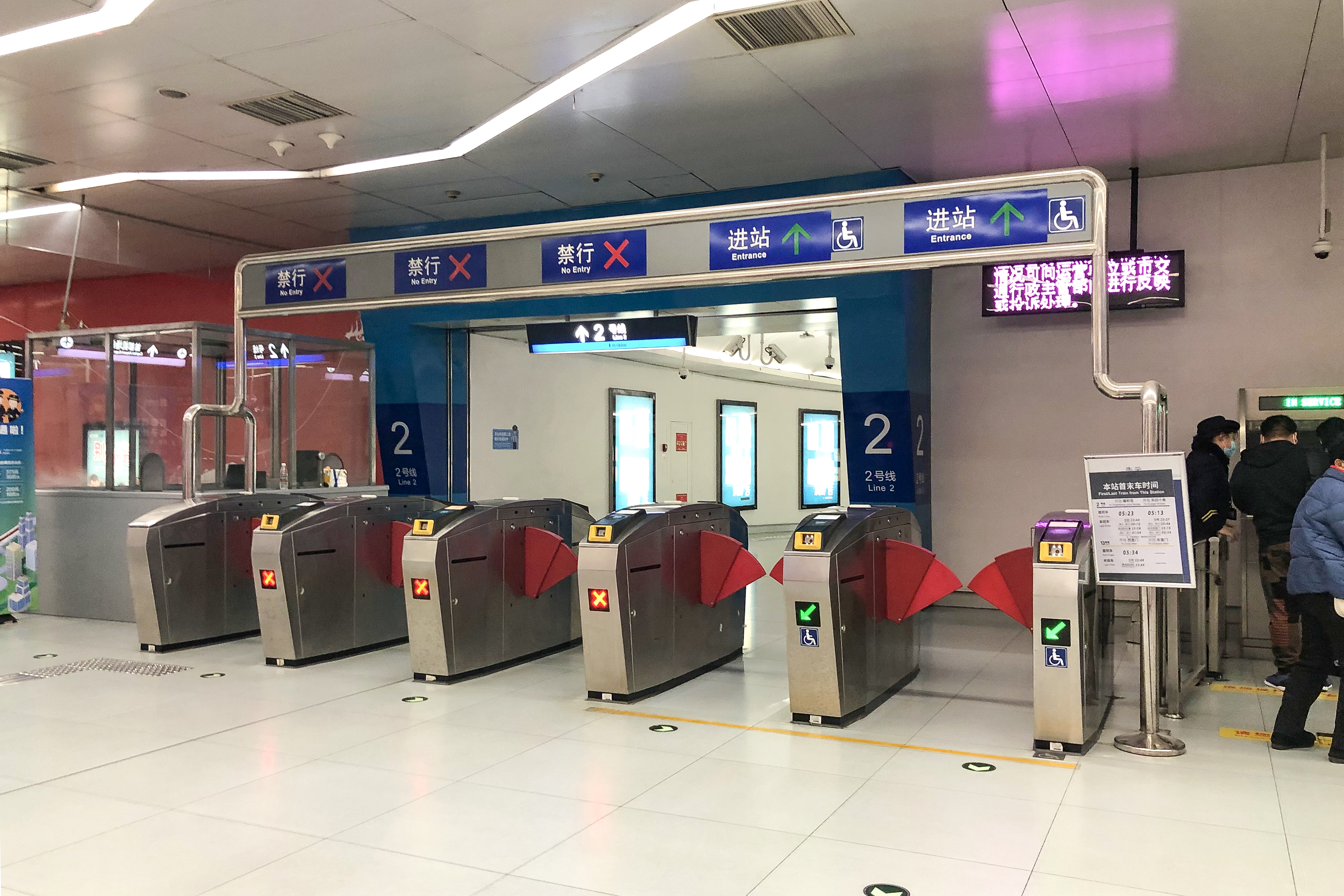
Capital Airport Express concourse entrance to conventional lines

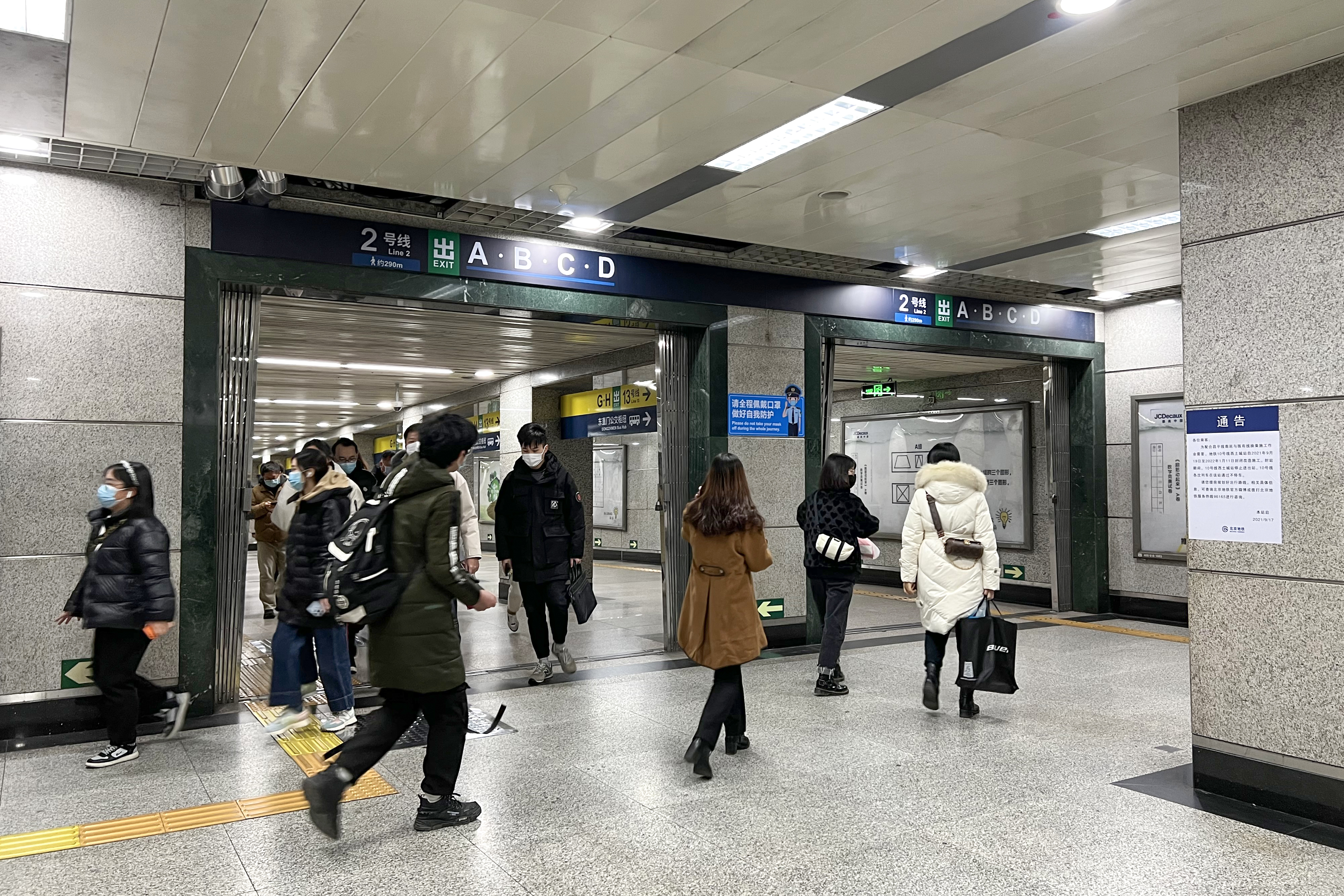
Interchange interface from Line 13 to Line 2

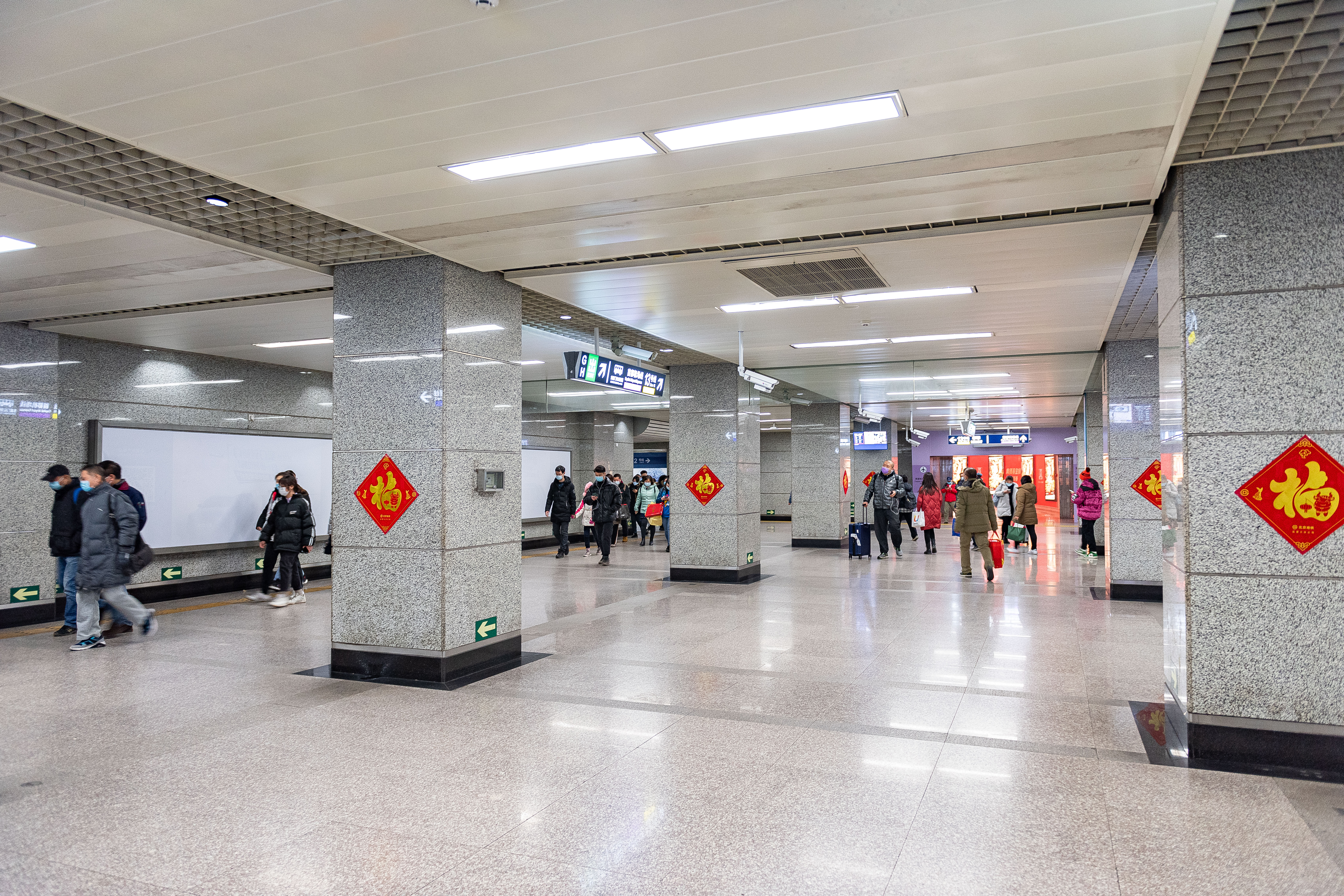
Interchange corridor in the direction of Capital Airport Express

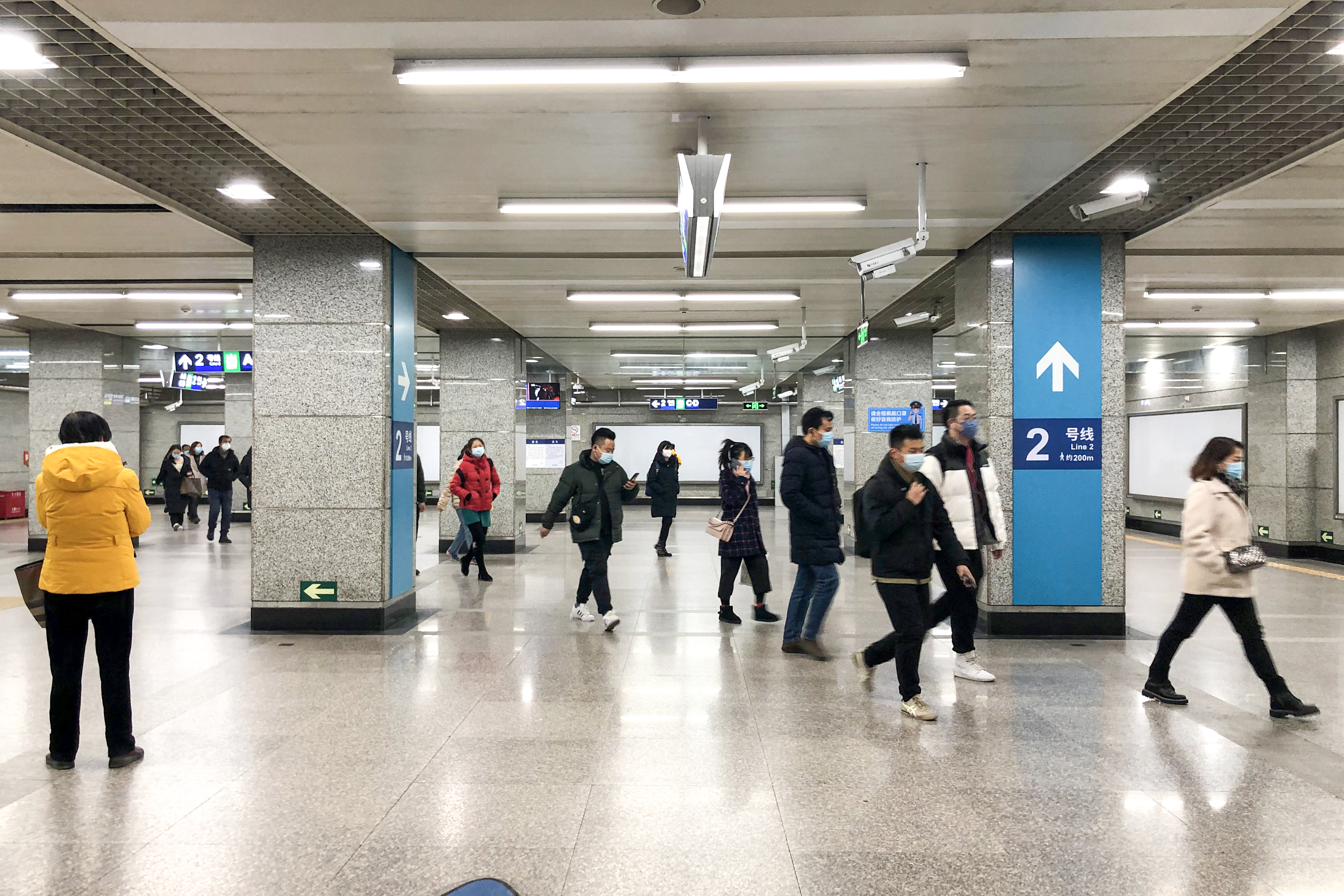
Interchange corridor in the direction of Line 2

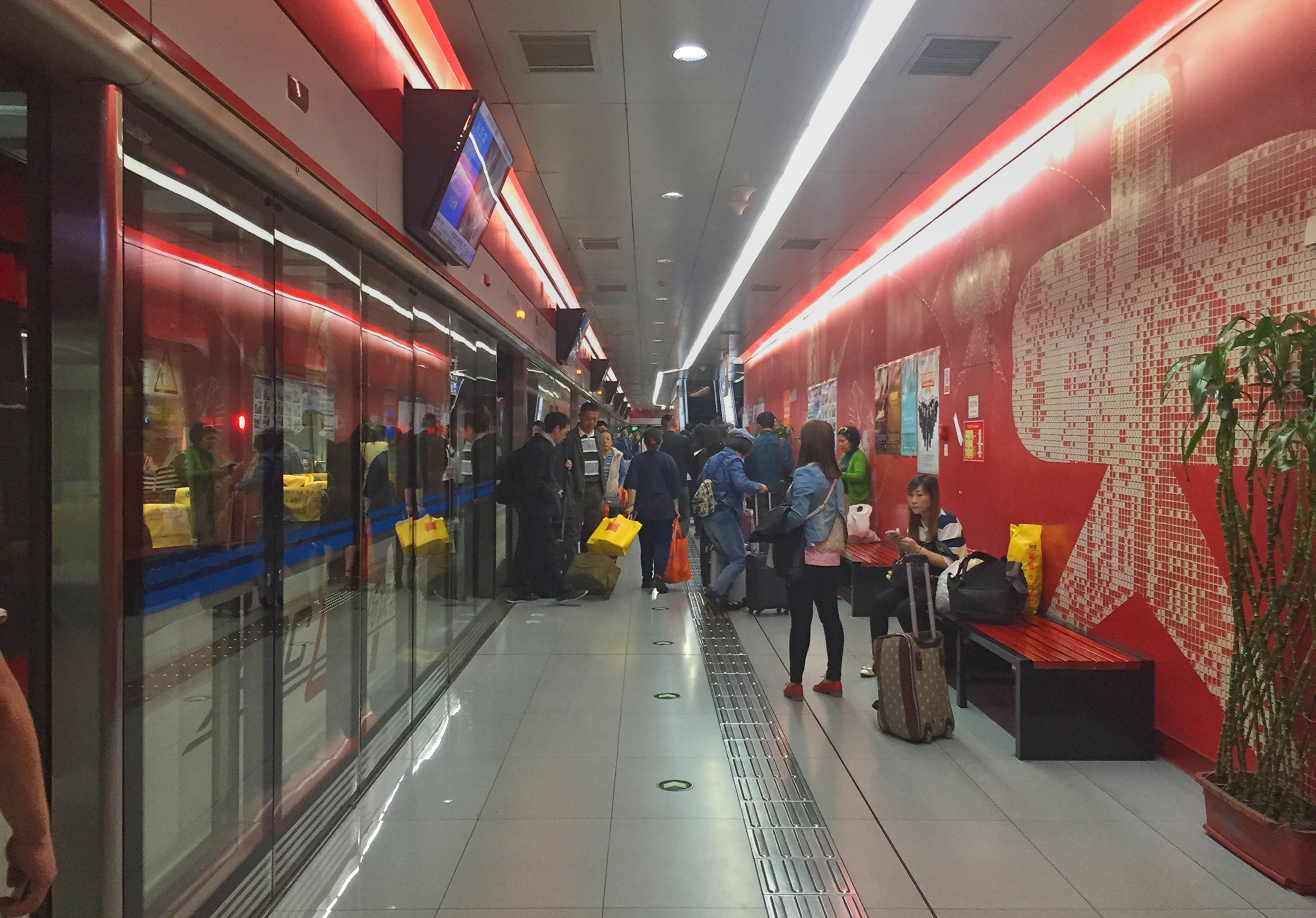
Capital Airport Express platform (April 2016)

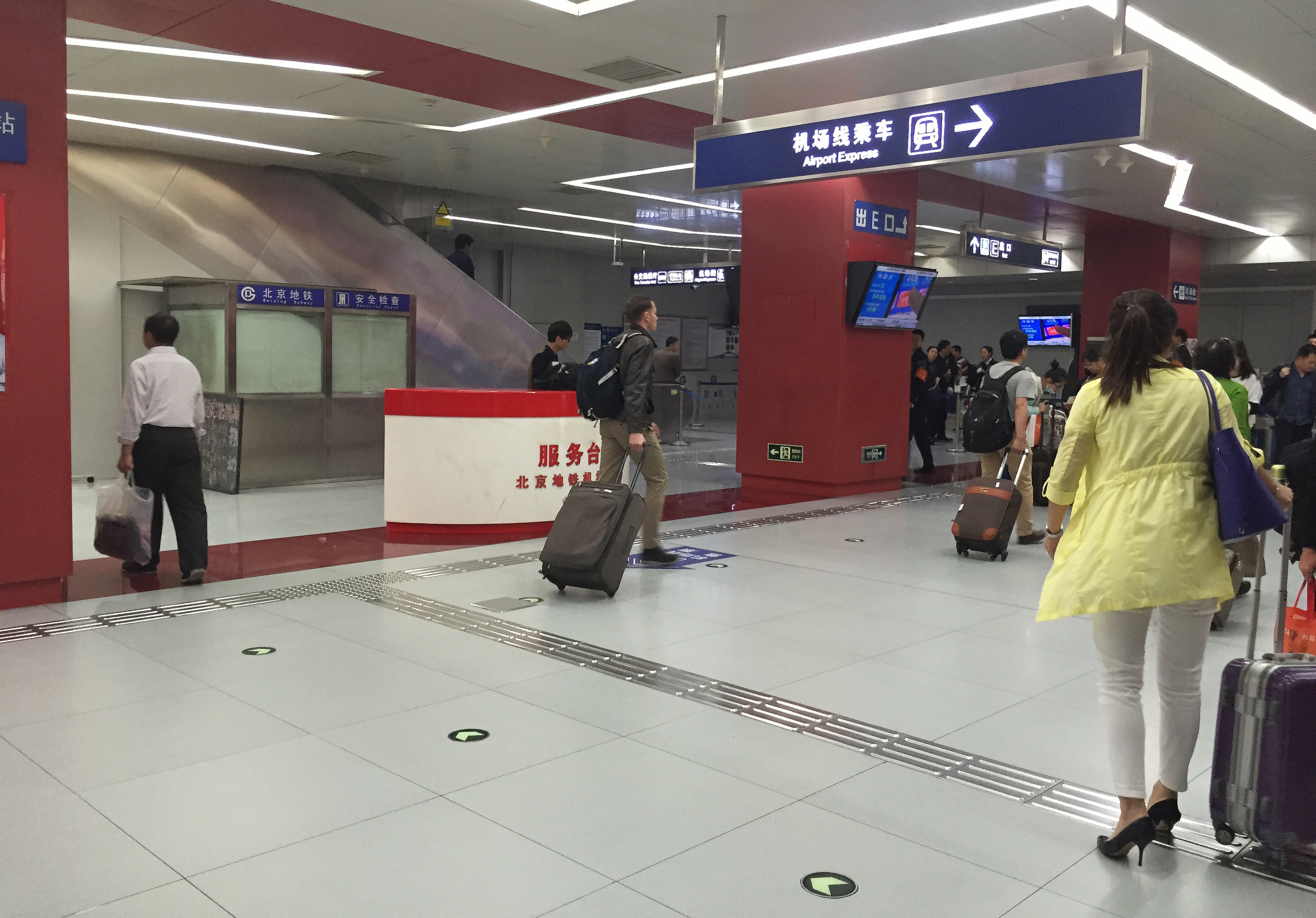
Capital Airport Express concourse (April 2016)

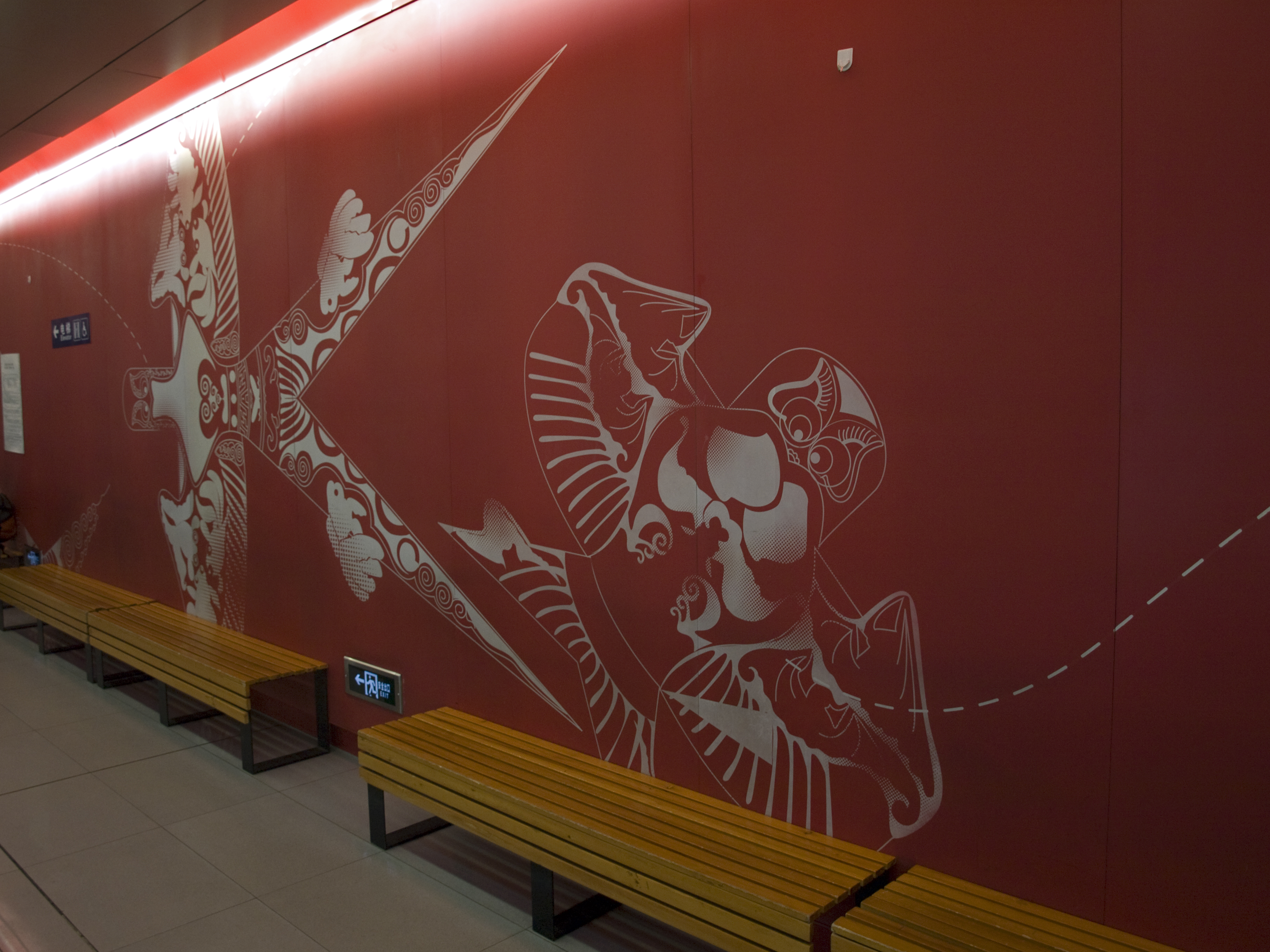
Capital Airport Express platform artwork
