= 3 Hao Hangzhanlou (Terminal 3) station =

Beijing Subway station

3 Hao Hangzhanlou (Terminal 3) 3号航站楼
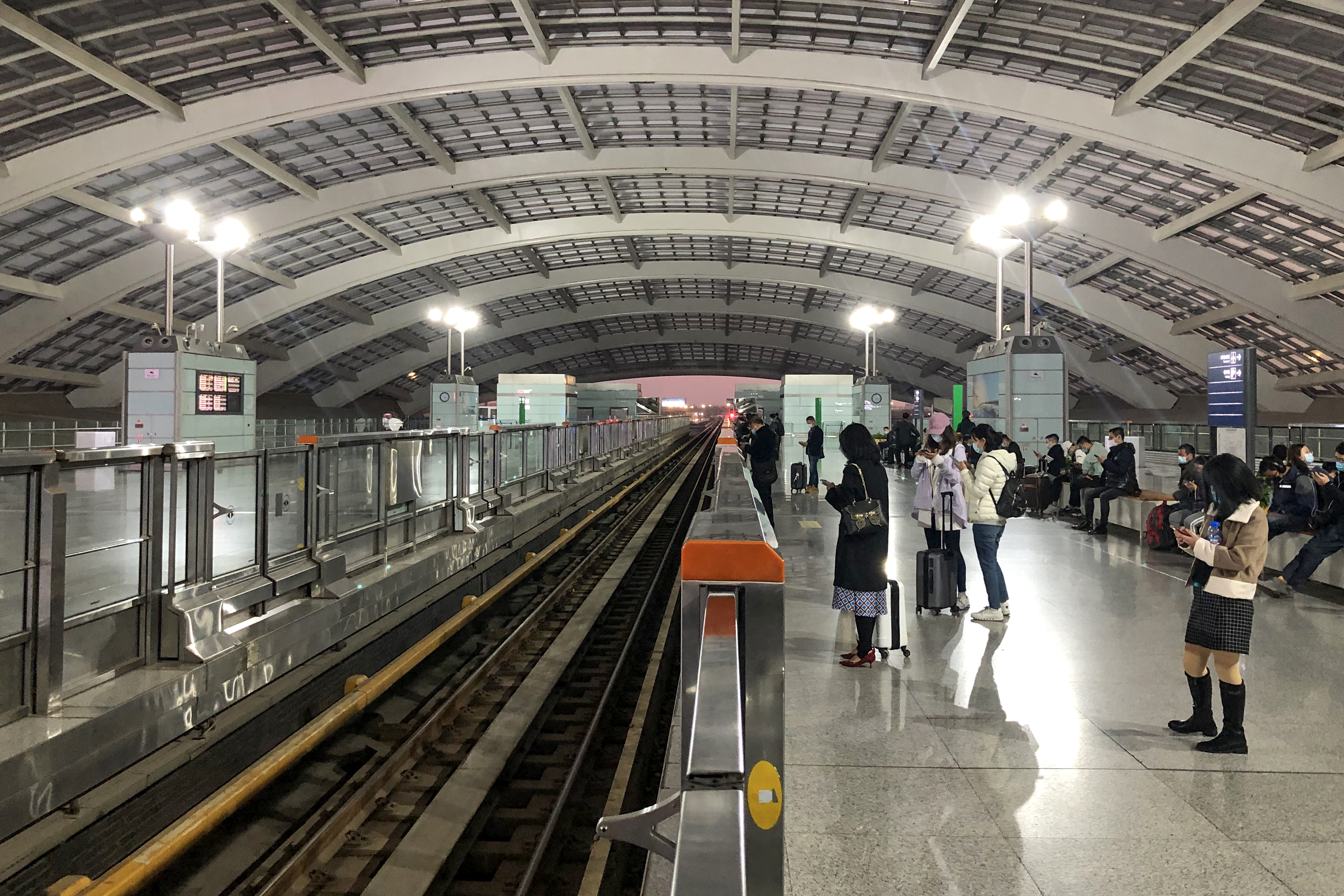
- Platform

General information
- Location: Terminal 3, Beijing Capital International Airport; Shunyi District, Beijing; China
- Coordinates: 40.0542°N 116.6157°E
- Operator: Beijing Capital Metro Corp., Ltd.
- Line: Capital Airport Express
- Platforms: 3 (1 island platform and 1 side platform)
- Tracks: 2

Construction
- Structure type: Elevated
- Accessible: Yes

History
- Opened: July 19, 2008; 18 years ago

Services
Preceding station	Beijing Subway	Following station
Sanyuanqiao One-way operation	Capital Airport Express	Terminal 2 towards Beixinqiao
Location
- Location within Beijing

3 Hao Hangzhanlou (Terminal 3) station (simplified Chinese: 3号航站楼站; traditional Chinese: 3號航站樓站; pinyin: Sānhào Hángzhànlóu zhàn) is a station on the Capital Airport Express of the Beijing Subway, serving Terminal 3 at Beijing Capital International Airport.

== Station layout ==
The station has an elevated island and side platform.

== Gallery ==
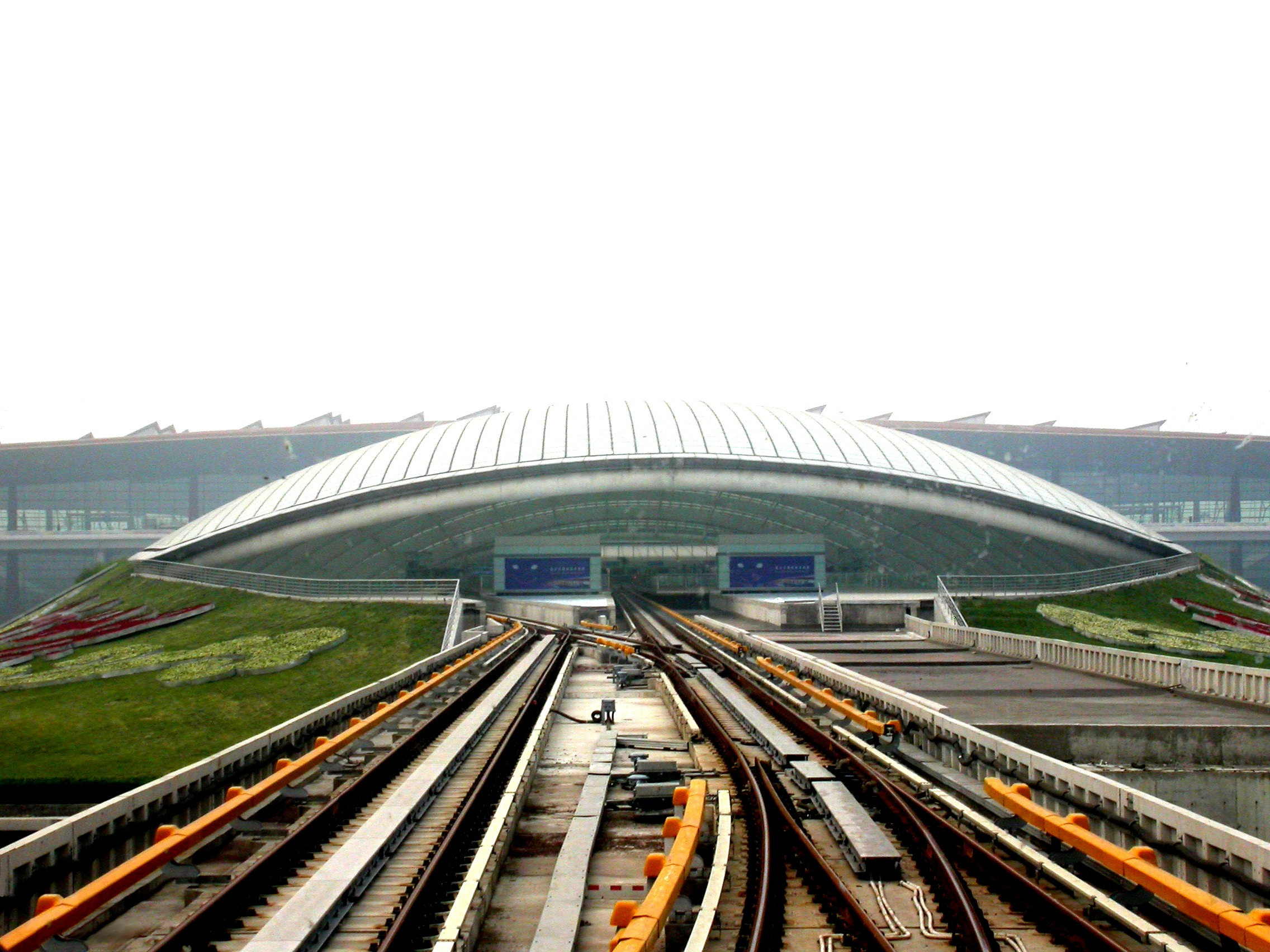
Station Exterior

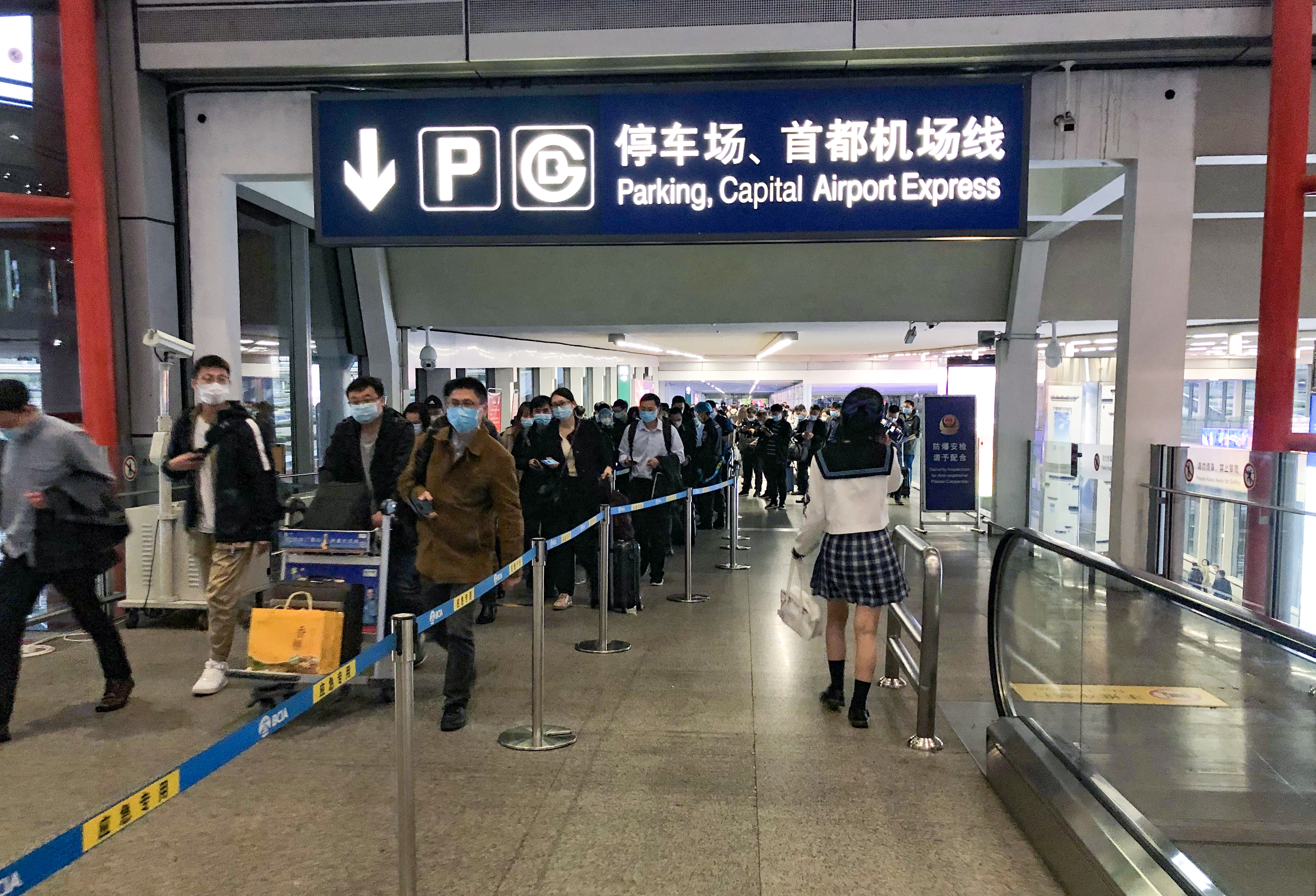
Entrance

== Future Development ==
Line 20 (Line R4) and Line S6 is planned to expand to Terminal 3. Line 20 has an expected completion date of 2030.
