= Capital Airport Express =

Metro line and Airport rail system of Beijing Subway

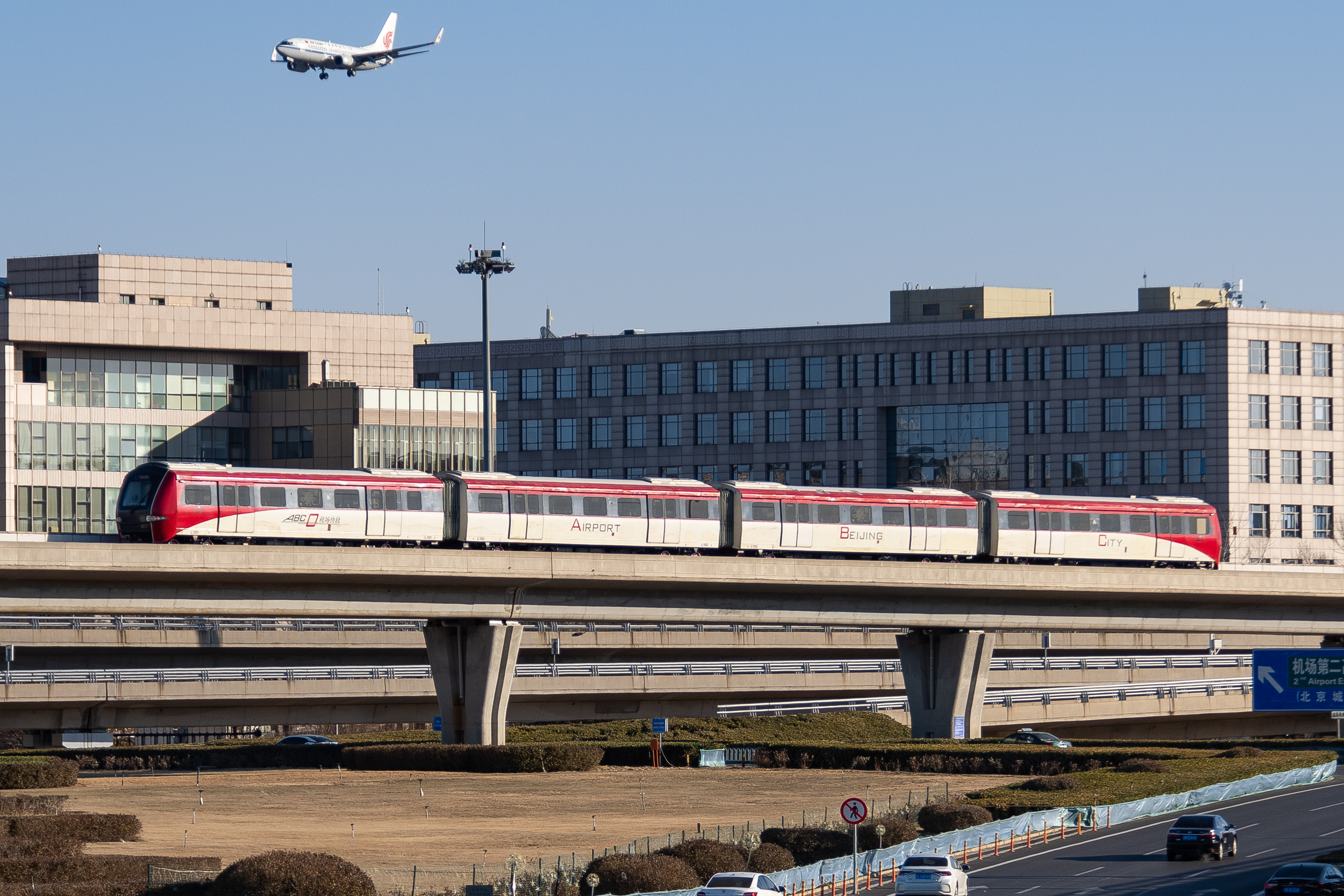
- A Capital Airport Express train leaving Terminal 3 station with a landing Boeing 737-700 of Air China on the background

Overview
- Other name: M34/L1 (planned name)
- Native name: 首都机场线
- Status: Operational
- Locale: Dongcheng, Chaoyang, and Shunyi districts Beijing
- Termini: Terminal 3 / Terminal 2; Beixinqiao
- Stations: 5

Service
- Type: Airport rail link, Rapid transit
- System: Beijing Subway
- Operator(s): Beijing Subway Co. (19 July 2008 - 27 March 2017); Beijing Capital Metro Corp., Ltd. (27 March 2017 - present)
- Depot: Tianzhu
- Rolling stock: 4-car Type L_{B} (QKZ5 - CNR/CRRC Changchun–Bombardier Innovia ART 200)
- Daily ridership: 31,300 (2014 Avg.); 49,100 (2014 Peak)

History
- Opened: 19 July 2008; 18 years ago

Technical
- Line length: 29.9 km (18.6 mi)
- Character: Underground and elevated
- Track gauge: 1,435 mm (4 ft 8 1/2 in)
- Electrification: 750 V DC third rail linear induction motor
- Operating speed: 110 km/h (68 mph)

Capital Airport Express
- Simplified Chinese: 北京地铁首都机场线
- Traditional Chinese: 北京地鐵首都機場線
Transcriptions
Standard Mandarin
- Hanyu Pinyin: Běijīng Dìtiě Shǒudū Jīchǎng Xiàn

The Capital Airport Express (Chinese: 首都机场线; pinyin: Shǒudū Jīchǎng Xiàn), also known by the initials ABC, Airport Beijing City, is an airport rail link of the Beijing Subway from Beixinqiao station to the Beijing Capital International Airport. The line became operational on July 19, 2008. On subway maps, the Capital Airport Express' color is purplish gray (Pantone 666C).

== Overview ==
Capital Airport Express trains first depart Beixinqiao, stop at Dongzhimen and Sanyuanqiao, then stop at Terminal 3. Trains then reverse at Terminal 3 and head to Terminal 2. Trains reverse again and proceed to Beixinqiao, stopping at Sanyuanqiao and Dongzhimen along the way.

A one-way fare on the Capital Airport Express costs RMB(¥) 25, with no free transfers to or from other lines.

== Stations ==
Service routes		Station Name		Connections	Nearby Bus Stops	Distance km		Location
Service routes		English	Chinese	Connections	Nearby Bus Stops	Distance km		Location
●	●	Beixinqiao	北新桥	5	13 82 84 106 107 115 117 135 612	0.000	0.000	Dongcheng
●	●	Dongzhimen	东直门	2 13	18 24 44 75 106 107 117 123 130 132 135 142 200 359 401 404 413 416 612 850快 852 852快 915 916快 918 935快 942 980快 快速直达专线72 快速直达专线102 通医专线3 夜20 专26	1.822	1.822	Dongcheng
●	●	Sanyuanqiao	三元桥	10 12	18 95 104 132 300 300快 302 359 368 379 401 403 404 419 536 604 641 671 850 850快 852 915 916 916快 918 935 935快 939 980快 快速直达专线72 快速直达专线195 快速直达专线196 夜30	3.022	4.844	Chaoyang
●	↑	3 Hao Hangzhanlou (Terminal 3)	3号航站楼	PEK	顺9 顺10	18.322	23.166	Shunyi
↳	●	2 Hao Hangzhanlou (Terminal 2)	2号航站楼	PEK	顺7	7.243	30.409	Chaoyang

== History ==
The Airport Express was originally planned to run non-stop between Dongzhimen and the Capital Airport. An intermediate stop at Sanyuanqiao was subsequently added for the convenience of passengers connecting to Line 10.

Designers for the new line considered several types of technology for the Airport Express, including:

- high-speed maglev, similar to that of the Shanghai Maglev Train
- low-speed maglev, similar to that of the Linimo line in Japan
- conventional electric motor propulsion
- linear motor propulsion

The linear motor option was ultimately decided upon.

Planning accelerated after the city won the bid to host the 2008 Summer Olympic Games, which included a promise to connect the airport to the Olympic village by subway. The project cost ¥5.4bn and involved a consortium of companies led by the Beijing Dongzhimen Airport Express Rail Company.

The project operated under a tight delivery schedule, initially with very limited public disclosure. During construction, officials from both the Beijing Dongzhimen Airport Express Rail Co. and Bombardier expressed concerns about whether the project would be completed, as originally planned, by the end of 2007, with test operations to start in April 2008. At the time, Zhang Jianwei, chief country representative for Bombardier, called the short timetable for a project of this type unprecedented. Zhang expressed confidence that Bombardier would meet its responsibilities as its Chinese contractors routinely worked 24 hours a day, something not possible in other countries. He also noted, however, that even if the line were to open on time, the need for haste could compromise the quality of construction.

There was also considerable uncertainty over the progress of the project, the identity of contractors and its operational arrangement. Construction was reported to have begun on June 14, 2005, but aspects of the project still awaited the central government's approval. Local media reported in January 2005 that the train supplier had been "basically decided", but was not officially selected and announced until March 2006.

Track-laying began in March 2007 and was completed by November 2007. Testing using empty trains commenced in April 2008 and official operations started on July 19 of that year, in time for the opening of the Summer Olympic Games on August 8, 2008. The line delivered 2.17 million rides in 2008.

An expansion of the Tianzhu depot was approved in November 2017, improving headways from 10 minutes to 4 minutes.

The line was renamed from Airport Express to Capital Airport Express in September 2019, to avoid confusion with Daxing Airport Express.

A 1.8 km (1.1 mi) western extension to Beixinqiao station was opened for service on 31 December 2021.

Segment	Commencement	Length	Station(s)	Name
Dongzhimen — Terminal 3 / Terminal 2	19 July 2008	28.1 km (17.5 mi)	4	Initial phase
Dongzhimen — Beixinqiao	31 December 2021	1.8 km (1.1 mi)	1	Western extension

== Infrastructure and rolling stock ==
The Airport Express line adopts Advanced Rapid Transit (since renamed Innovia Metro) technology from Bombardier Transportation, with a fleet of 10 QKZ5 trains assembled by Changchun Railway Vehicles (CRV, now part of CRRC Corporation) under a technology transfer agreement. The vehicles were based on those used on AirTrain JFK in New York City, with Bombardier providing bogies as well as the electrical, propulsion and brake systems, which were assembled by CRV.

As with the majority of Beijing Subway trains, the Airport Express trains use a 750 V third rail power supply, and have a maximum speed of 110 kilometres per hour (68 mph). Trains are configured in fixed sets of four cars with a total of 230 seats, arranged in a longitudinal layout to maximize their quantity.

The line uses Alstom's "Urbalis" communications-based train control system, which is capable of driving trains automatically, although staff still monitor the trains from the front (Grade of Automation level 2). At the time of opening, this system made the Airport Express the first rapid transit line with automated operation in China, and the second such rail line of any kind, after the people mover in Terminal 3 at the airport, which was also supplied by Bombardier.

Since January 2020, the interiors of the QKZ5 trains were being renovated. The LCD TV display in the passenger compartment has been changed to a 27-inch smart multimedia display that can display flight information and the static paper route map above the door has also been replaced by dynamic LCD screens showing maps and passenger information.

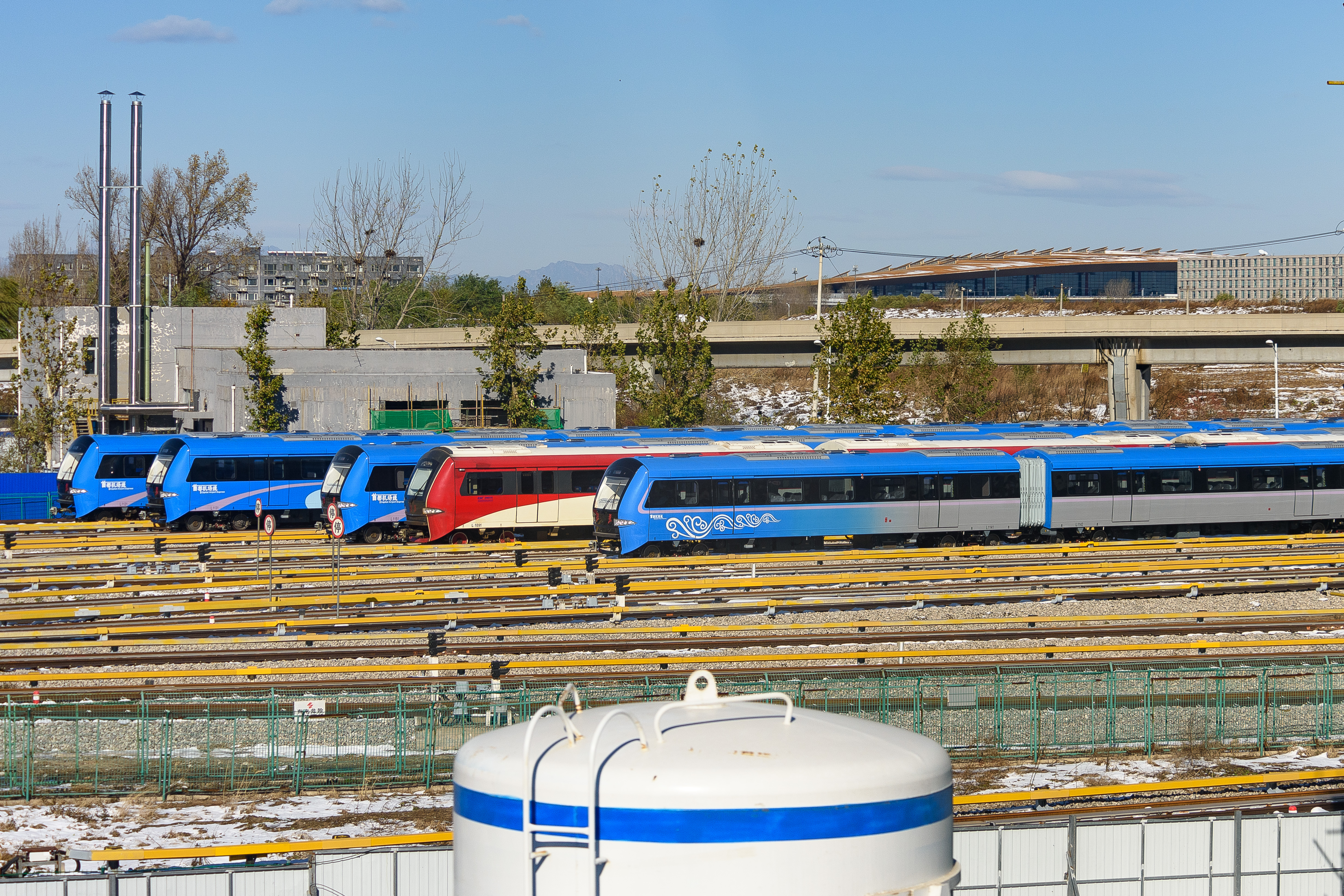
New Capital Airport Express Trains, note set L1 114 has a different livery.

In September 2018, an announcement requesting an 8 additional linear motor trainsets was made. CRRC Changchun won the bid in November of the same year. In 2021, the first train was delivered. The new trains have a blue livery was delivered, equipped with wider seats and mobile phone charging sockets.

Model	Image	Manufacturer	Year built	Amount in service	Fleet numbers	Depot
QKZ5		CRRC Changchun Railway Vehicles; Bombardier Transportation	2007	10 (2007)	L1 101–L1 110 (2007)	Tianzhu
CCD3004		CRRC Changchun Railway Vehicles	2021	5 (2022)	L1 111–L1 115 (2021)	Tianzhu

== Future development ==
=== Infill station ===
Reserved space for an infill station at Wangjingnan, where the Capital Airport Express intersects with Line 14, is also part of long-term plans.

=== Others ===
In the short term, there is little scope to increase the Capital Airport Express's capacity. The 4-car train sets used on the line have significantly lower capacity than those on other Beijing Subway lines, which operate 6-car or 8-car train sets. Also, the Capital Airport Express track design requires trains from Terminal 3 to first travel to Terminal 2 before returning to the city. If trains were able to return directly from Terminal 3 to the city the capacity on the route could be increased.

== See also ==
- Daxing Airport Express of Beijing Subway
- Beijing Capital Airport Bus
