= Beixinqiao station =

Beijing Subway station

Coordinates: 39.9408°N 116.4169°E

Beixinqiao 北新桥
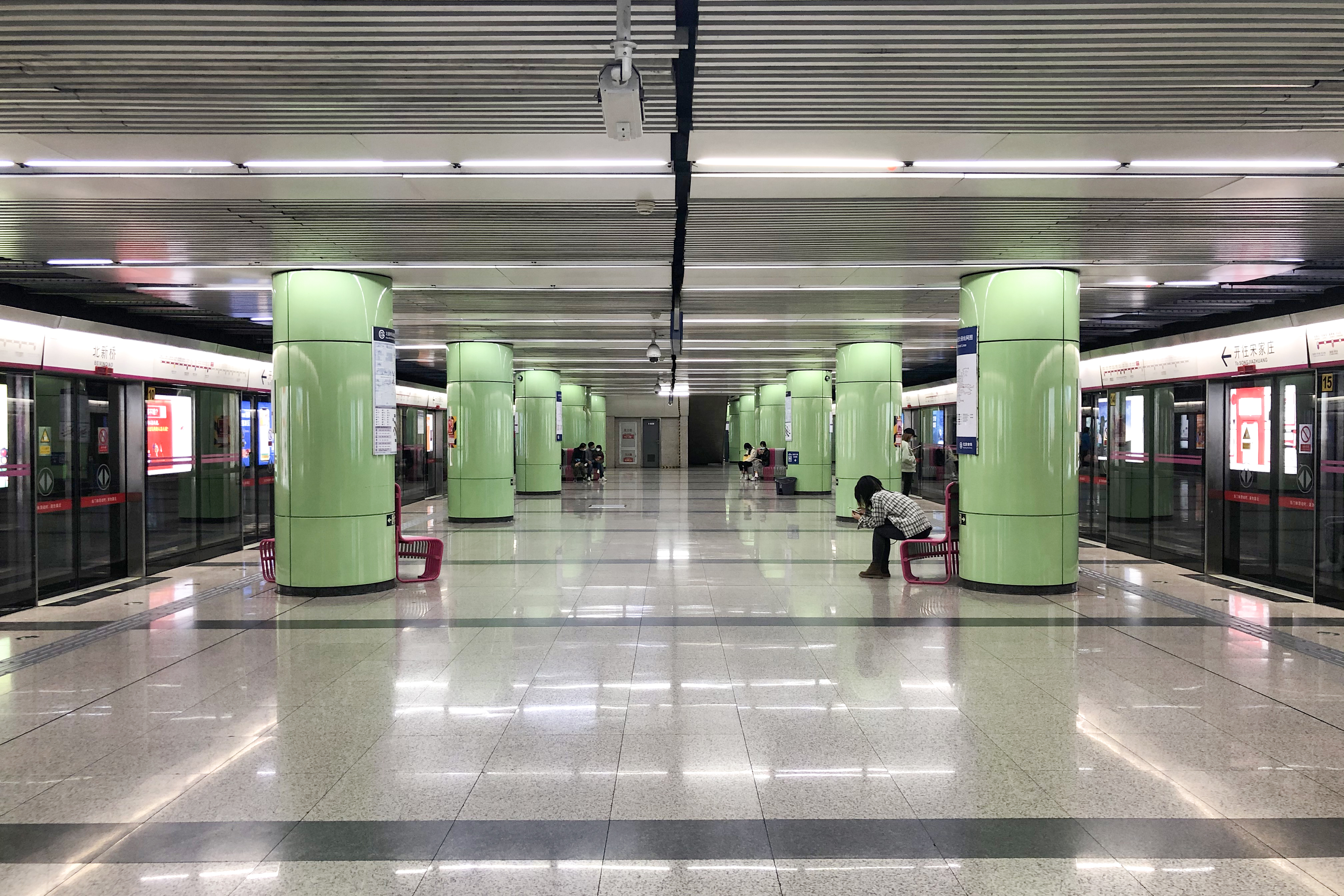
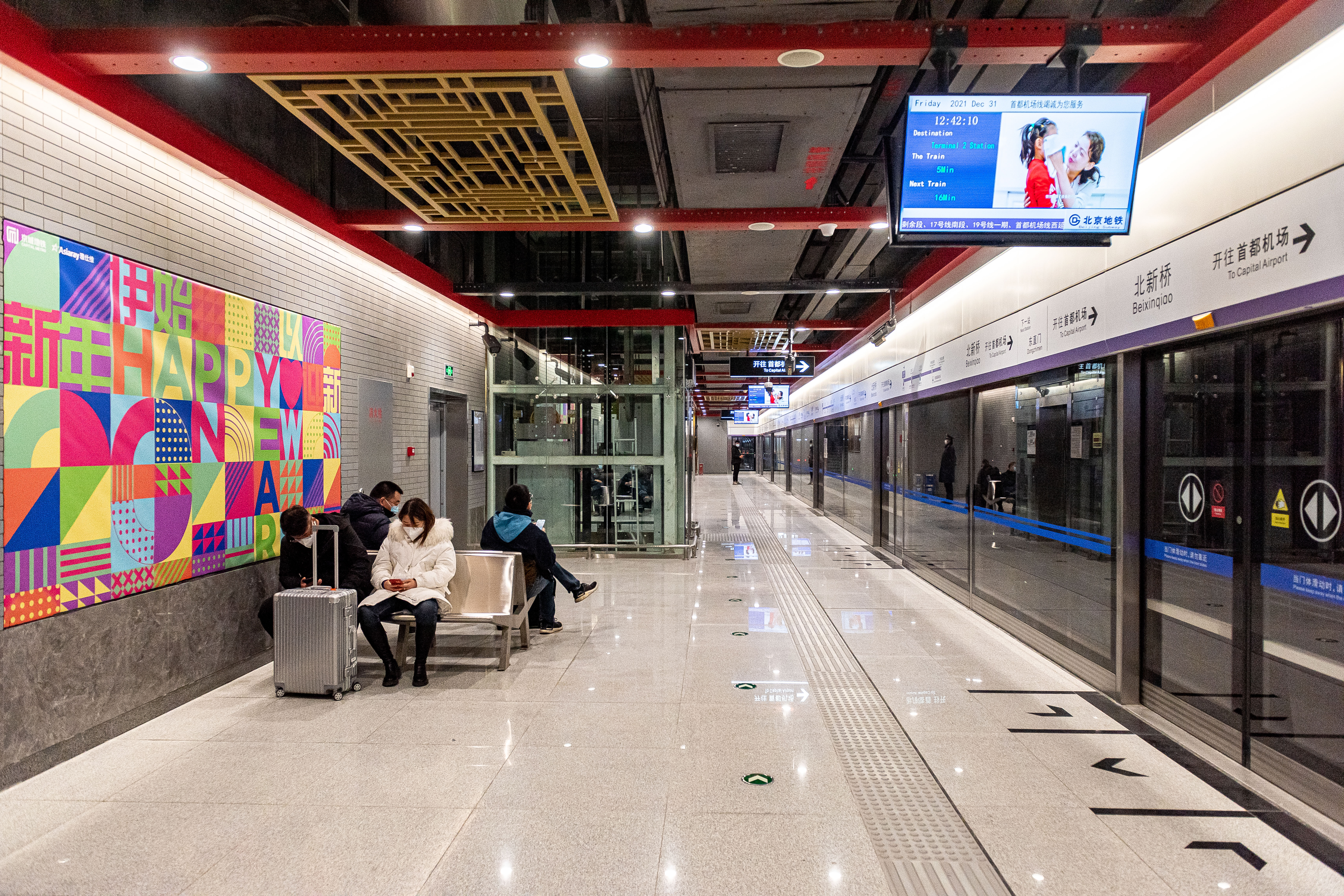
- Line 5 platform Capital Airport Express boarding platform

General information
- Location: Dongcheng District, Beijing; China
- Operator: Beijing Mass Transit Railway Operation Corporation Limited
- Lines: Line 5 Capital Airport Express
- Platforms: 4 (1 island platform and 2 side platforms)
- Tracks: 4

Construction
- Structure type: Underground
- Accessible: Yes

History
- Opened: October 7, 2007; 18 years ago (Line 5); December 31, 2021; 4 years ago (Capital Airport Express)

Services
Preceding station	Beijing Subway	Following station
Yonghegong Lama Temple towards Tiantongyuanbei	Line 5	Zhangzizhong Lu towards Songjiazhuang
Terminus	Capital Airport Express	Dongzhimen towards Beijing Capital International Airport
Location
- Location within Beijing

Beixinqiao station (simplified Chinese: 北新桥站; traditional Chinese: 北新橋站; pinyin: Běixīnqiáo Zhàn) is a station on Line 5 and Capital Airport Express of the Beijing Subway. It is located in Beixinqiao Subdistrict, at the intersection of Jiaodaokou East Street to the west, Dongzhimen Inner Street to the east, Yonghegong Street to the north and Dongsi North Street to the south.

== Station layout ==
The station has an underground island platform for Line 5 and 2 side platforms for Capital Airport Express.

== Exits ==
There are 5 exits, lettered A, B, C, D and E. Exit D is accessible via a stairlift, and exits A and E are accessible via elevators.

== Gallery ==
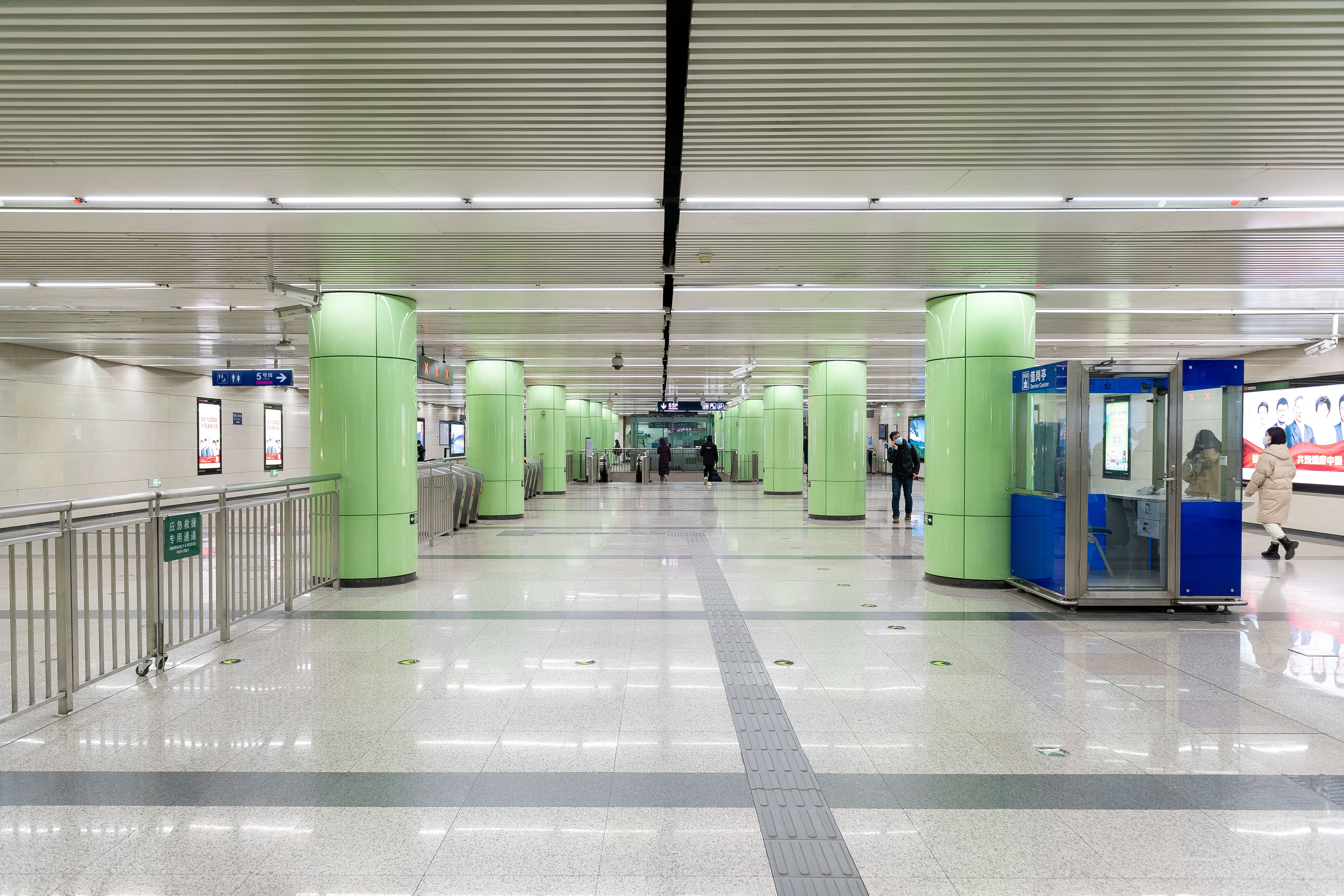
Line 5 concourse

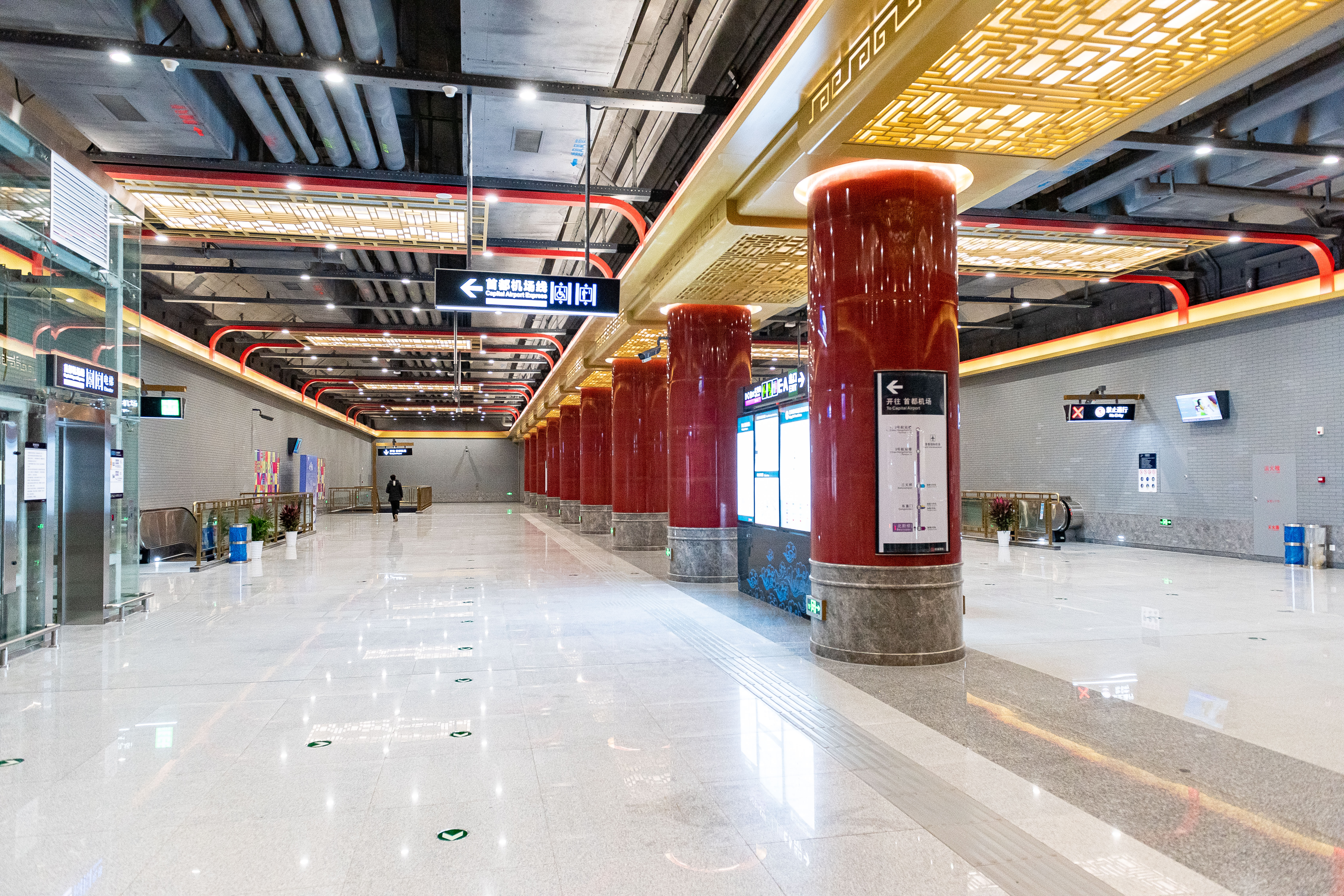
Capital Airport Express concourse

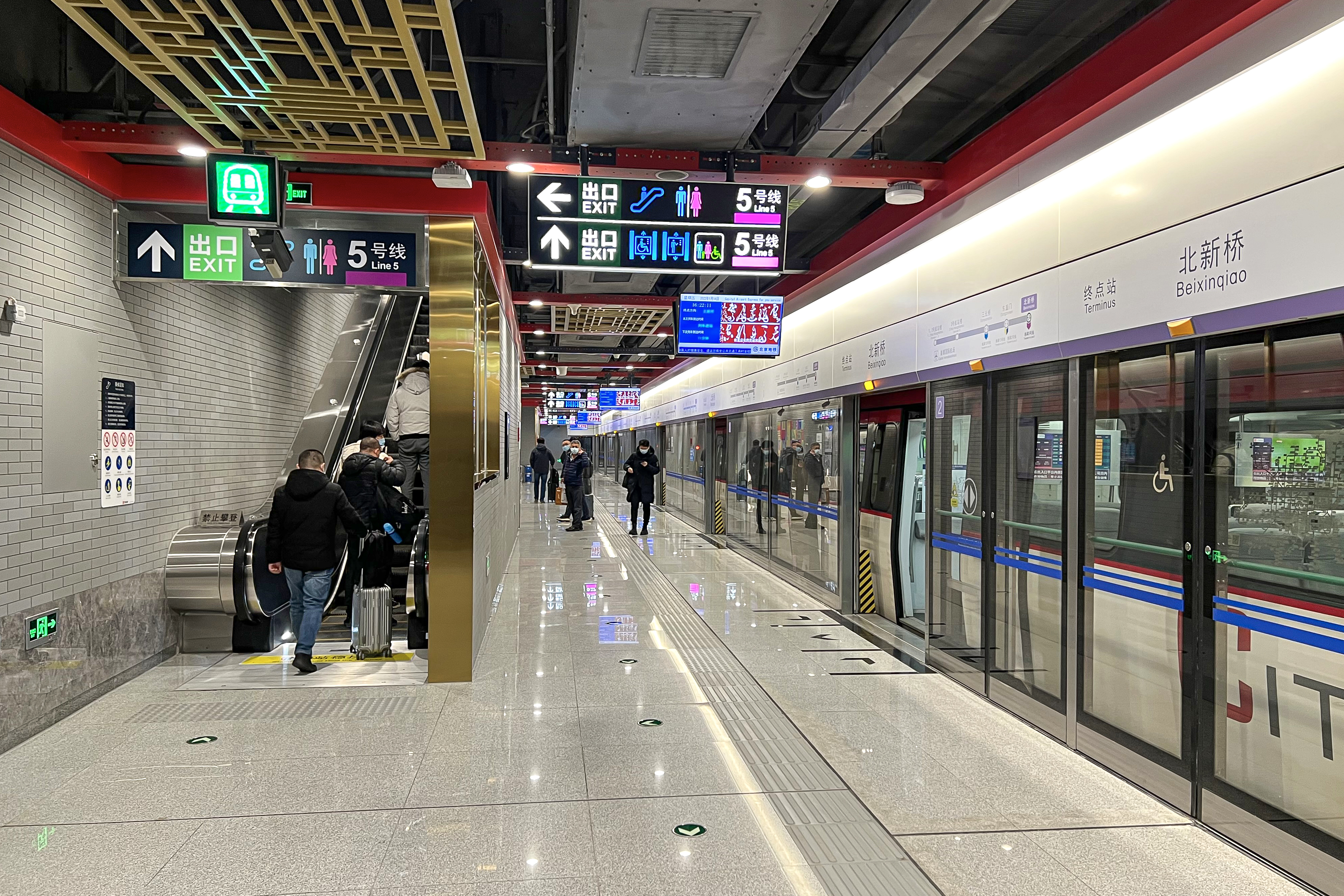
Capital Airport Express alighting platform

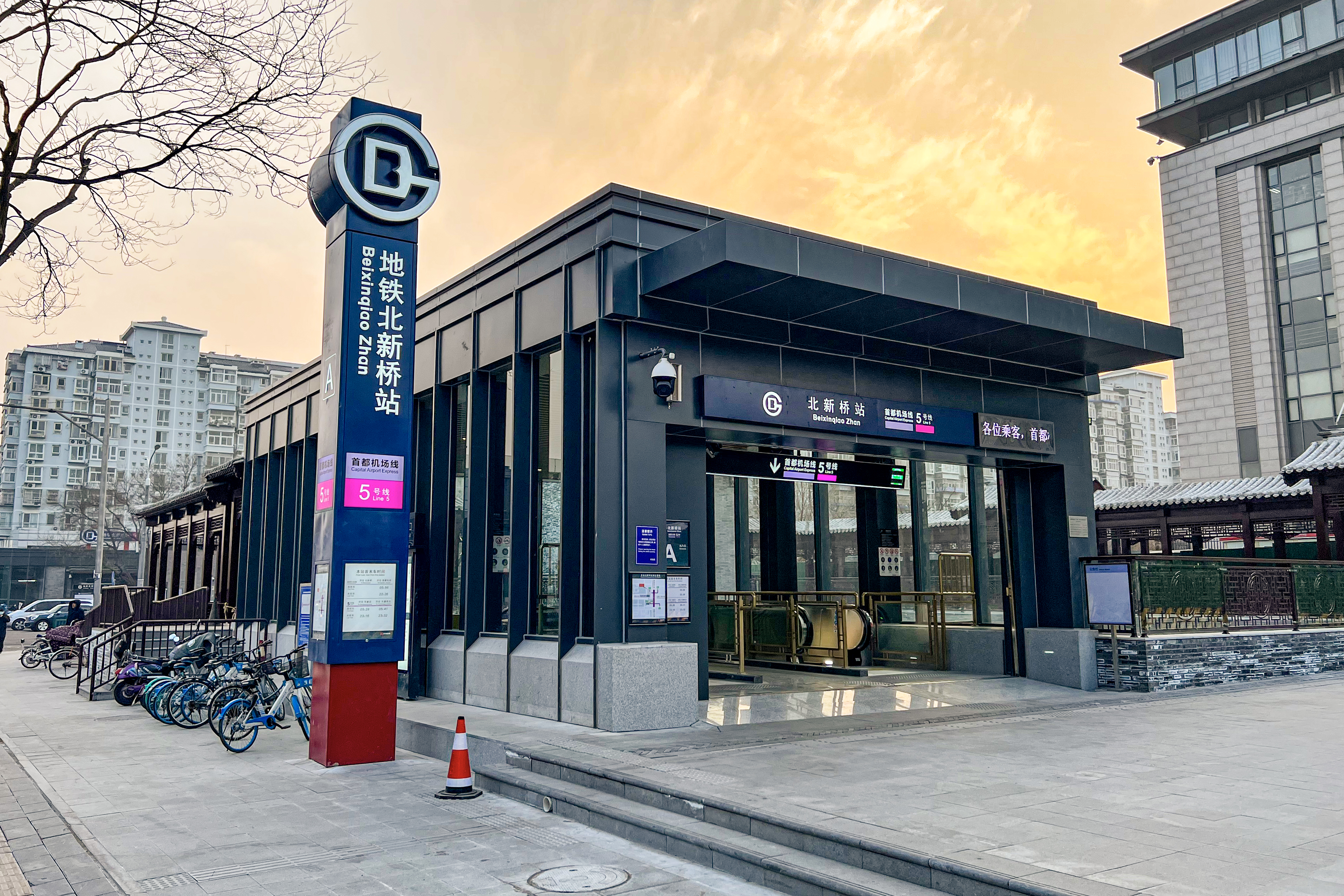
Beixinqiao Station Exit A
