= Caoqiao station =

Beijing Subway station

Coordinates: 39°50′45″N 116°21′07″E

Caoqiao 草桥
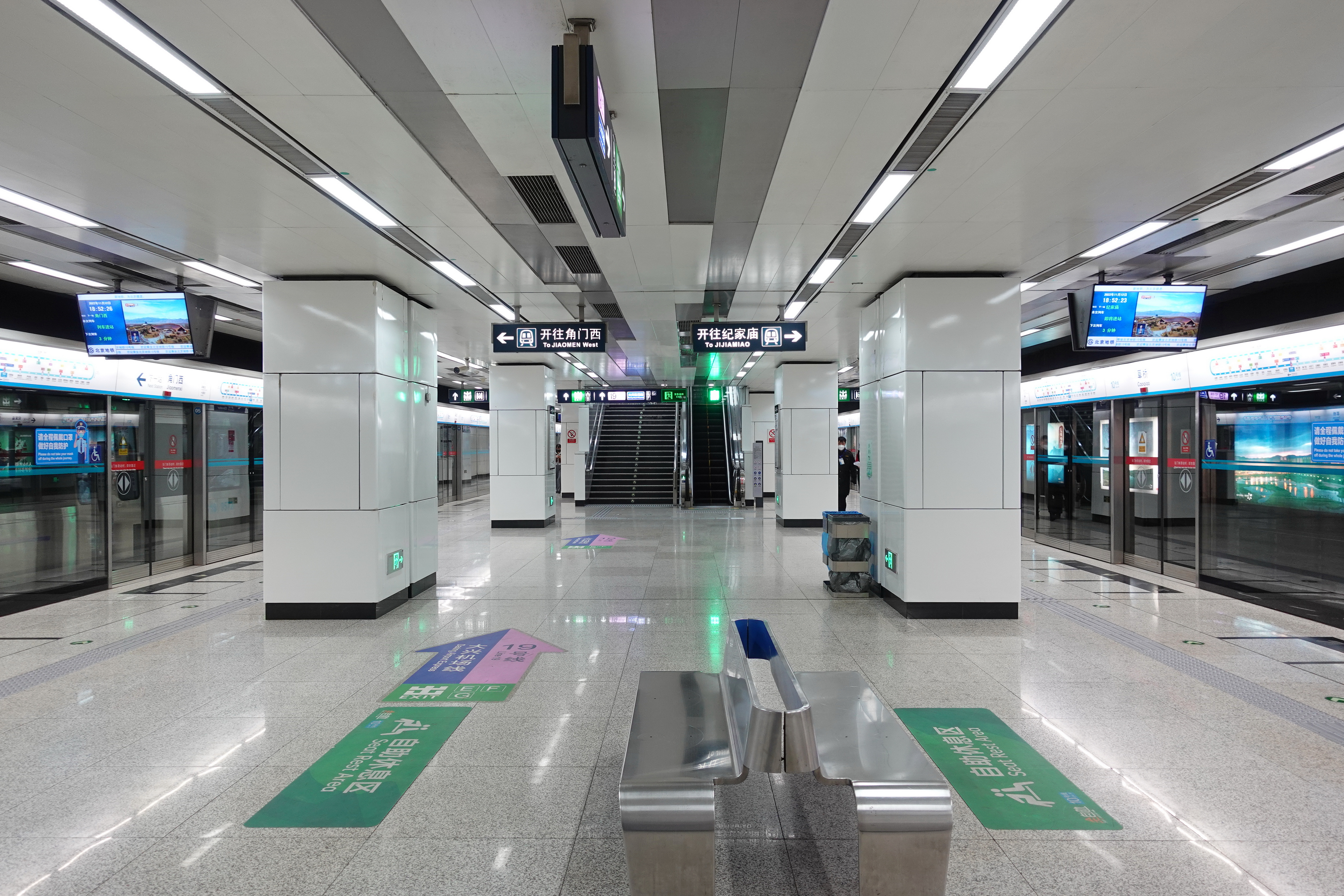
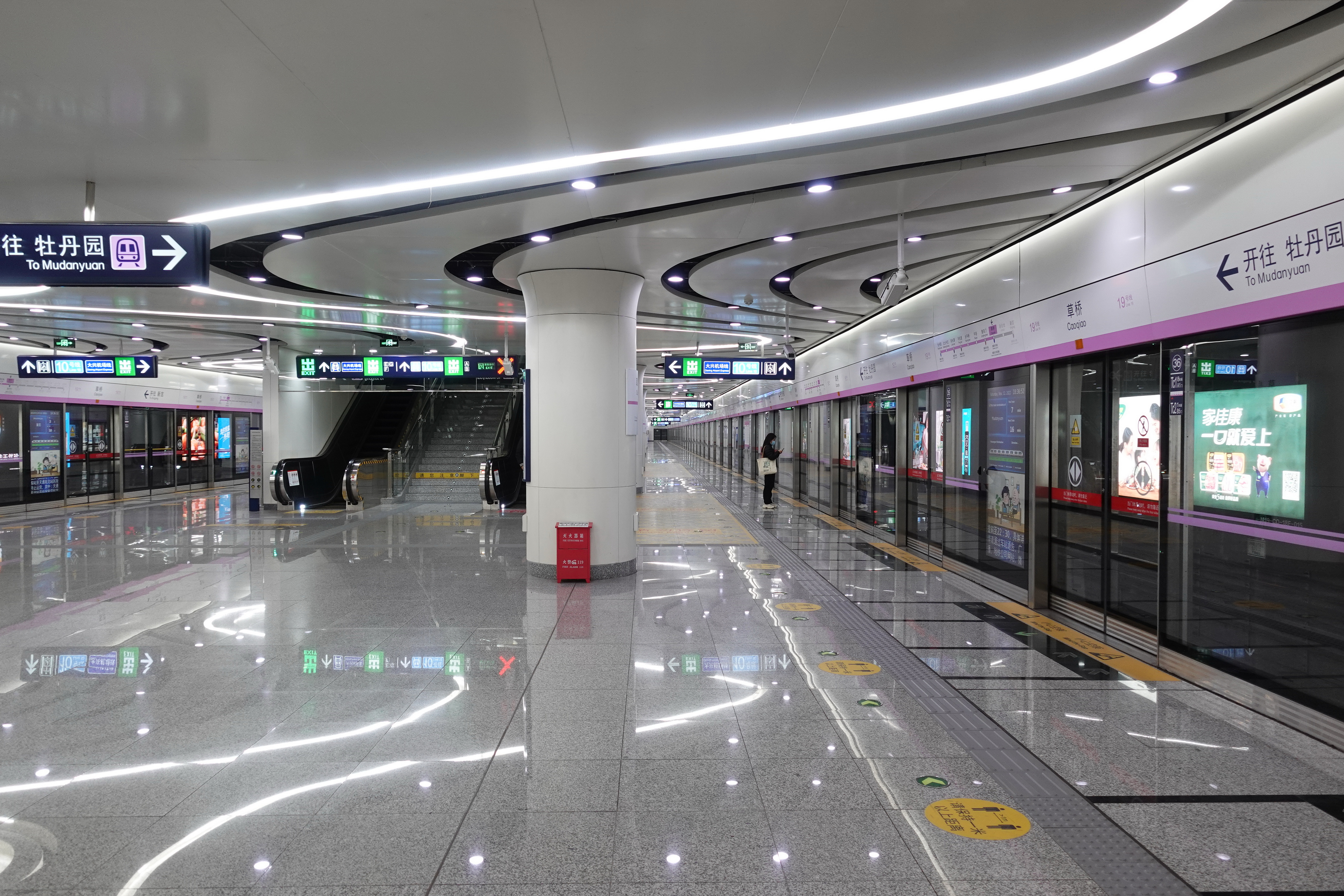
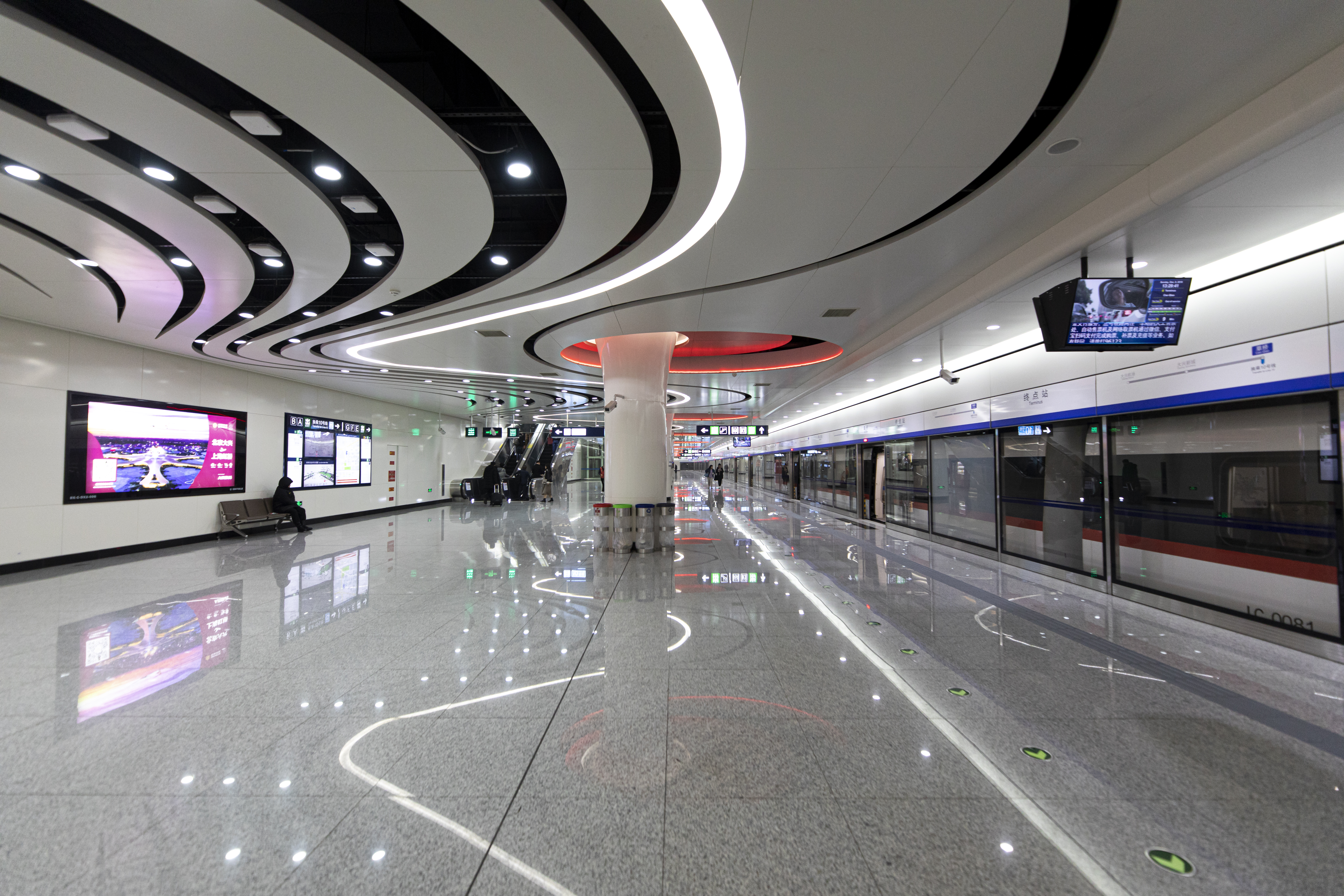
- Line 10 platform Line 19 platform Daxing Airport Express platform

General information
- Location: Yuquanyingqiao (玉泉营桥); Zhenguosi North Street (镇国寺北街) and Jingkai Expressway (京开高速公路); Yuquanying Subdistrict, Fengtai District, Beijing; China
- Operator: Beijing Mass Transit Railway Operation Corporation Limited (Line 10); Beijing Metro Operation Administration (BJMOA) Corporation Limited (Line 19 & Daxing Airport Express)
- Lines: Line 10; Line 19; Daxing Airport Express
- Platforms: 6 (2 island platforms and 2 side platforms)
- Tracks: 6

Construction
- Structure type: Underground
- Accessible: Yes

History
- Opened: December 30, 2012 (Line 10); September 26, 2019 (Daxing Airport Express); December 31, 2021 (Line 19)

Services
Preceding station	Beijing Subway	Following station
Jiaomenxi outer loop / anticlockwise	Line 10	Jijiamiao inner loop / clockwise
Jingfengmen towards Mudanyuan	Line 19	Xinfadi towards Xingong
Terminus	Daxing Airport Express	Daxing Xincheng towards Daxing Airport
Location
- Location within Beijing

Caoqiao station (simplified Chinese: 草桥站; traditional Chinese: 草橋站; pinyin: Cǎoqiáo zhàn) is a station on Line 10, Line 19 and Daxing Airport Express of the Beijing Subway.

== Opening time ==
The station for Line 10 opened on December 30, 2012.

The station for Daxing Airport Express opened on September 26, 2019.

The station for Line 19 opened on December 31, 2021.

== Station layout ==
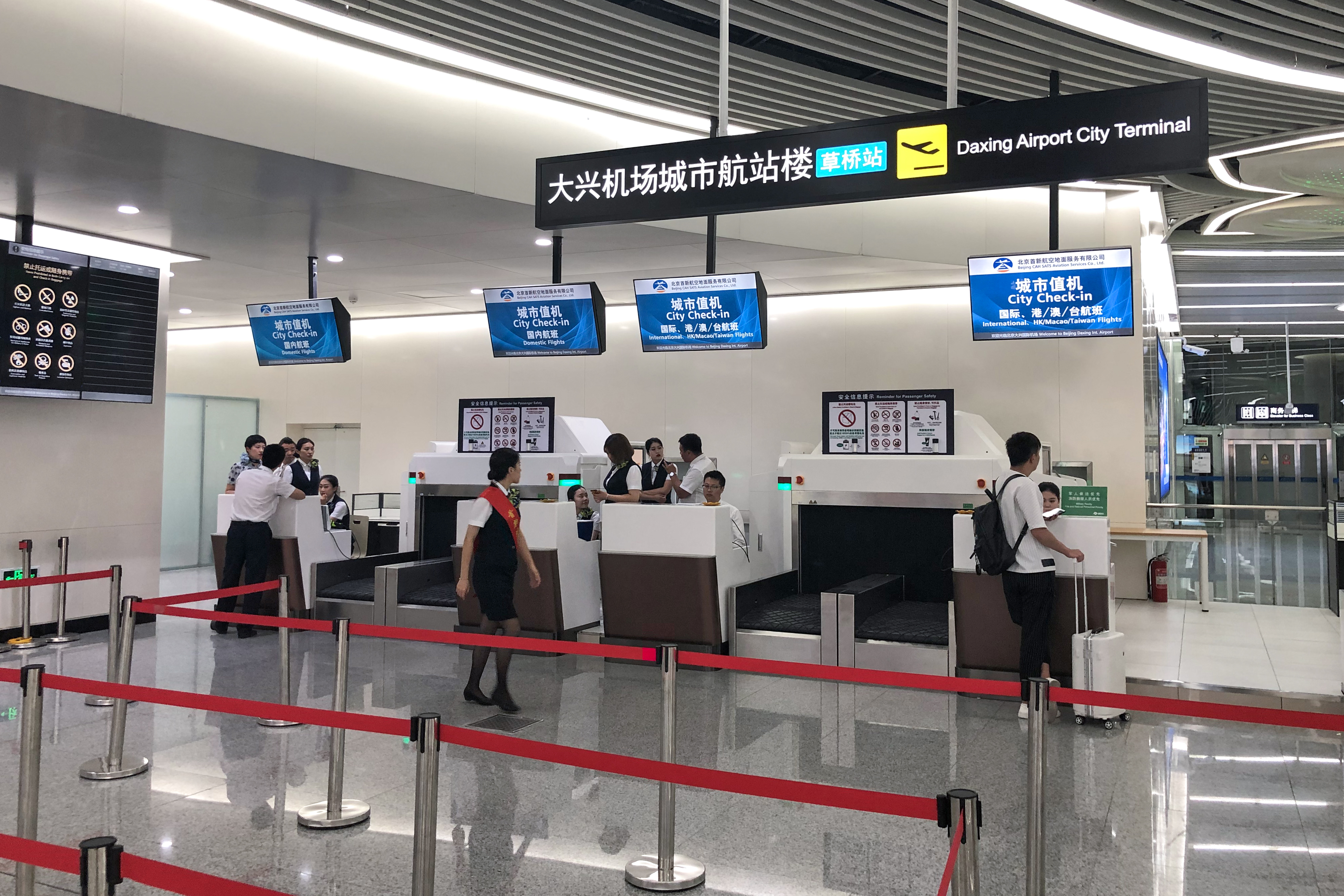
In-town check-in counters at Caoqiao station

The line 10 and line 19 stations both have underground island platforms, and the Daxing Airport Express station has 2 underground side platforms. The Daxing Airport Express station provides an in-town check-in service for flights departing Beijing Daxing International Airport, with 4 counters in the southwest of Daxing Airport Express concourse. XiamenAir has an individual information desk in the Daxing Airport Express concourse.

== Exits ==
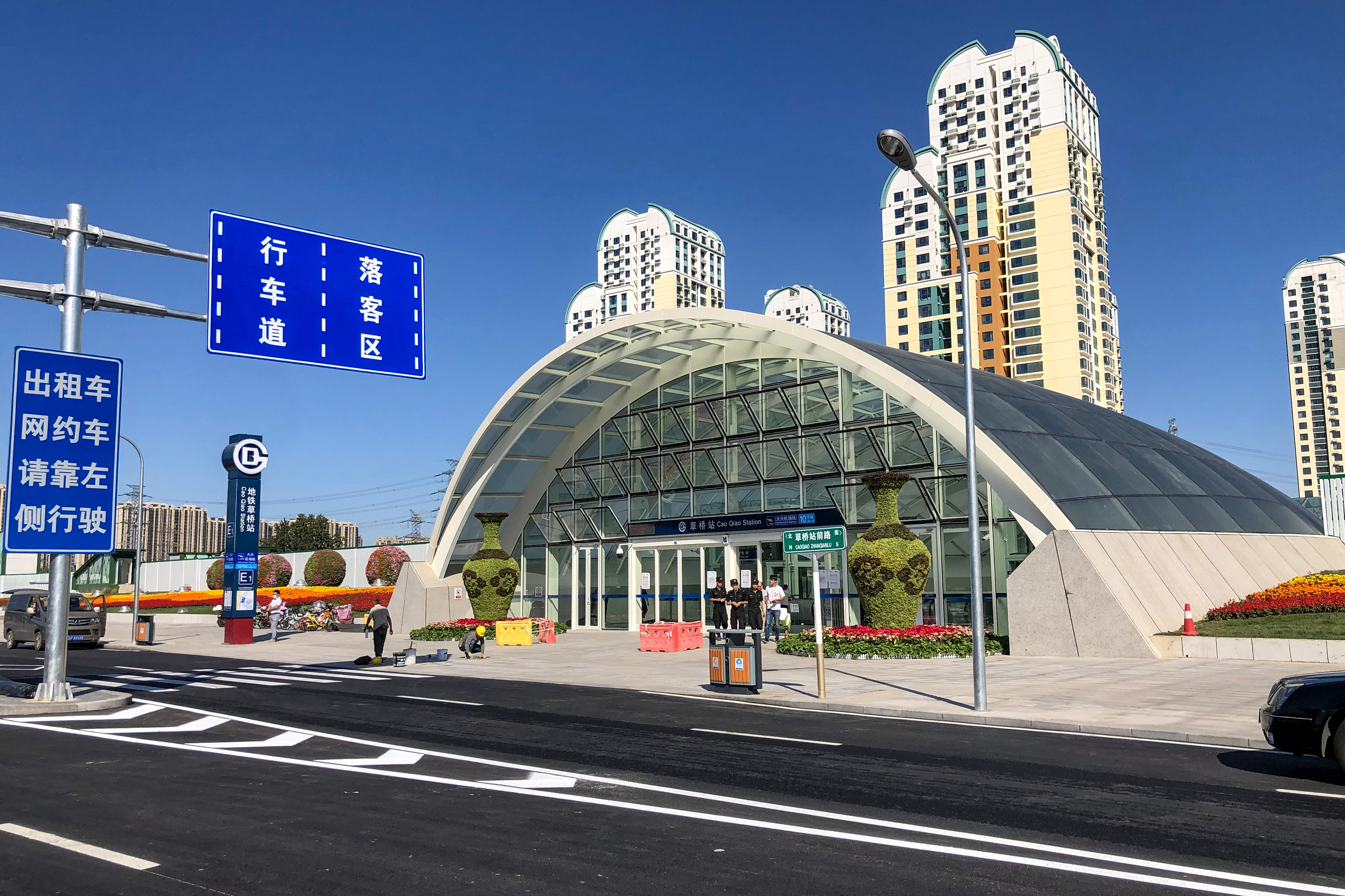
Exit E_{1}

There are 5 exits in operation, lettered A, B, E_{1}, F and G. Two more exits, lettered E_{2} and H, are under construction.

Exits A, E_{1}, F, and G are accessible.

== Gallery ==
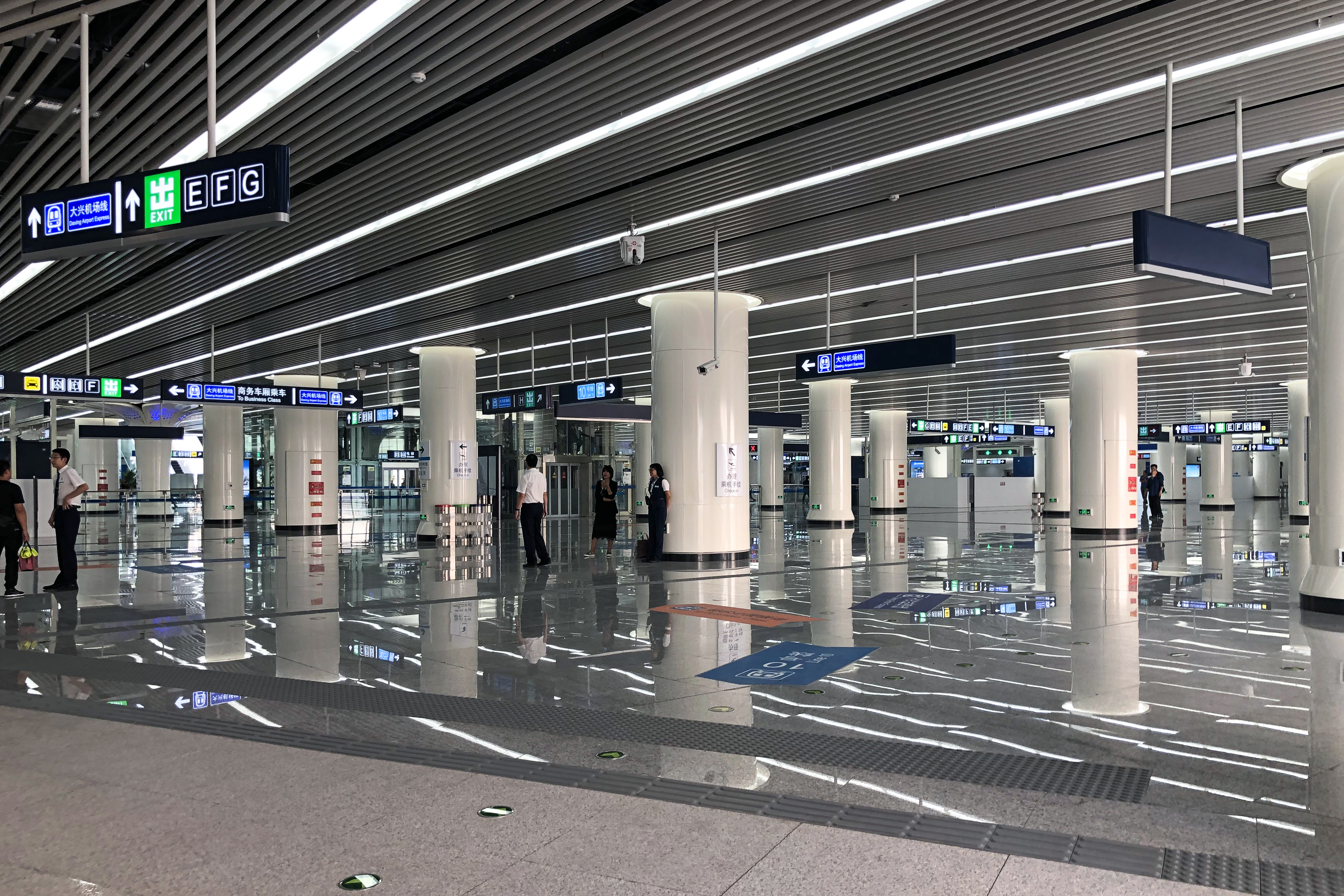
Daxing Airport Express concourse

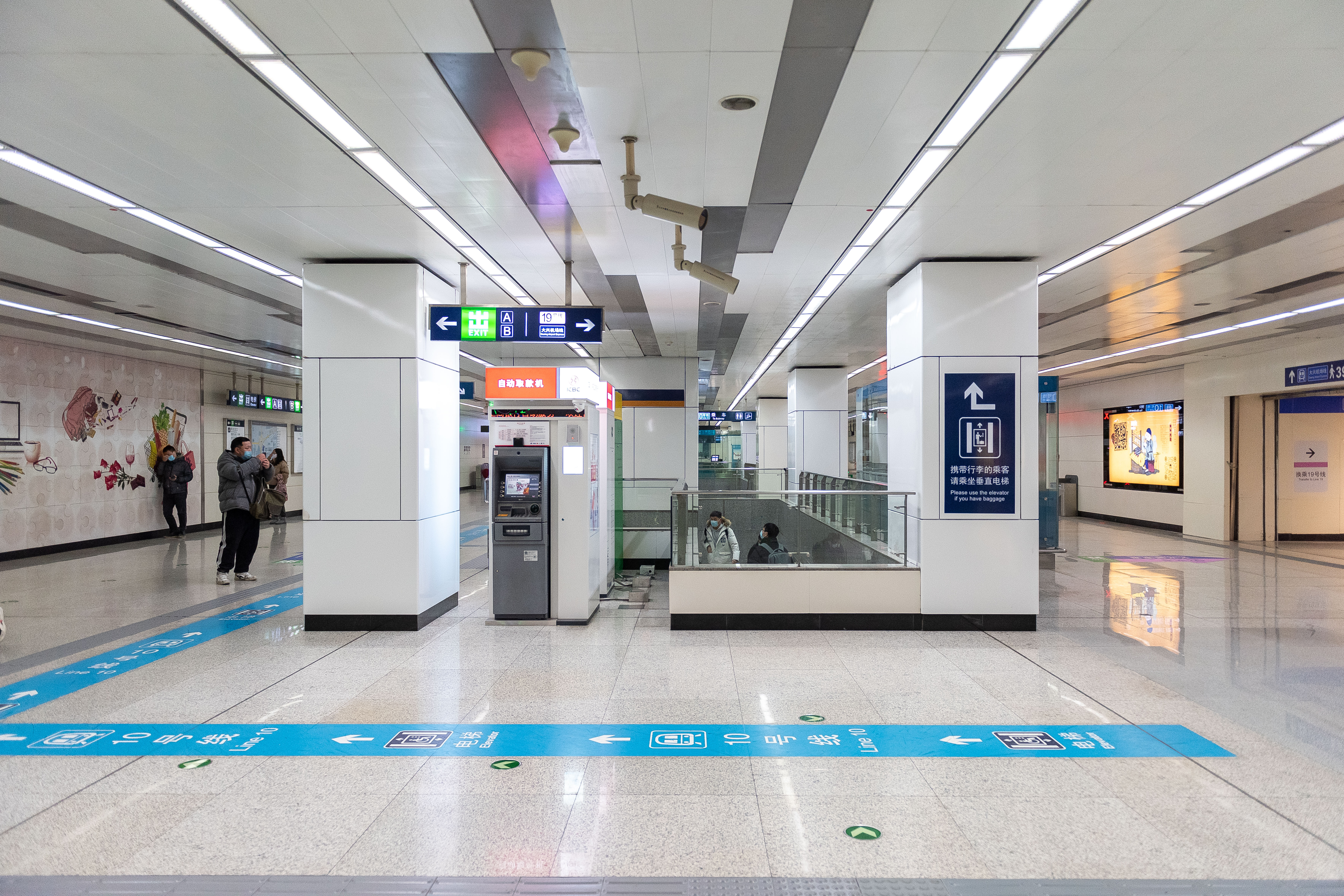
Line 10 concourse

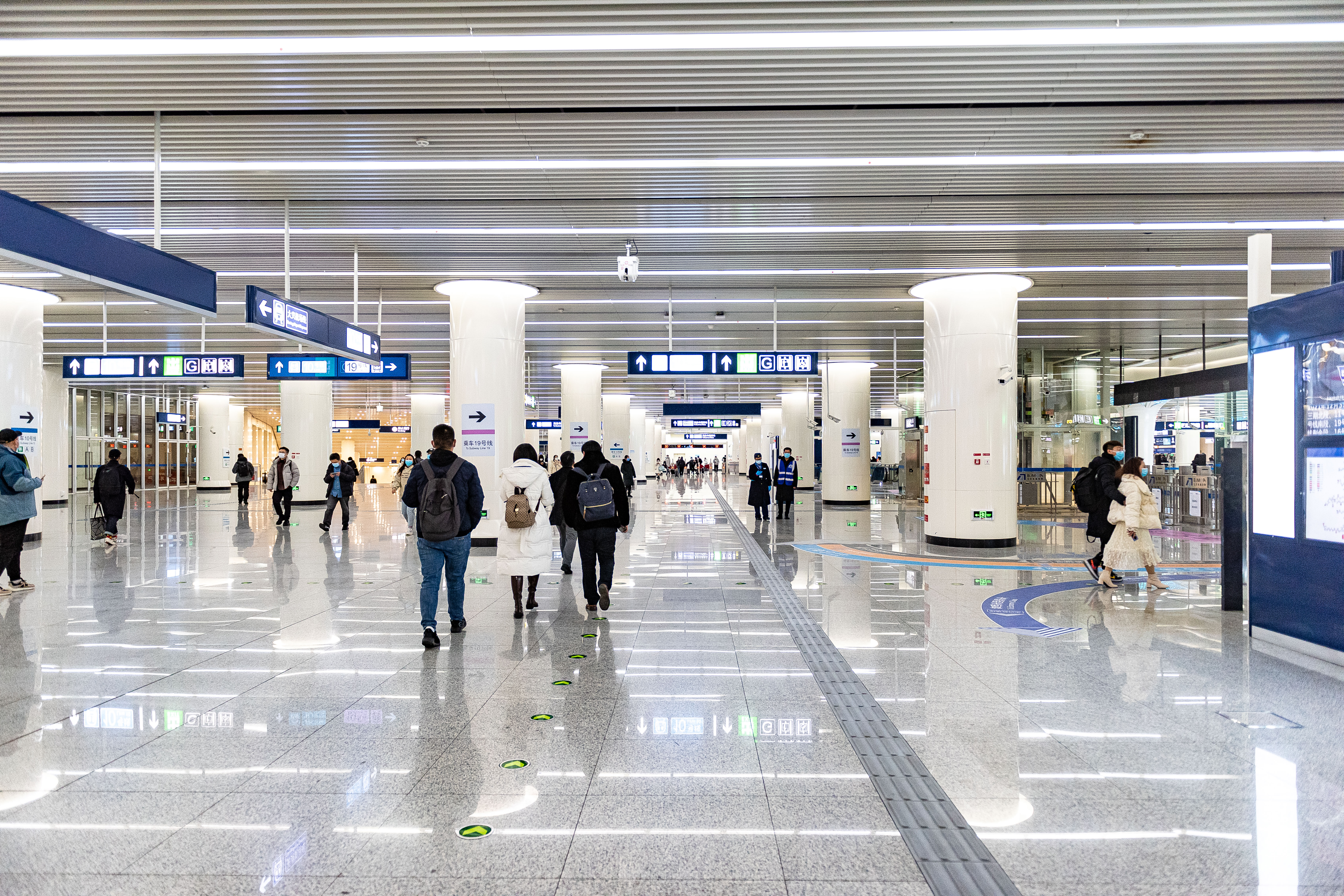
Line 19 concourse

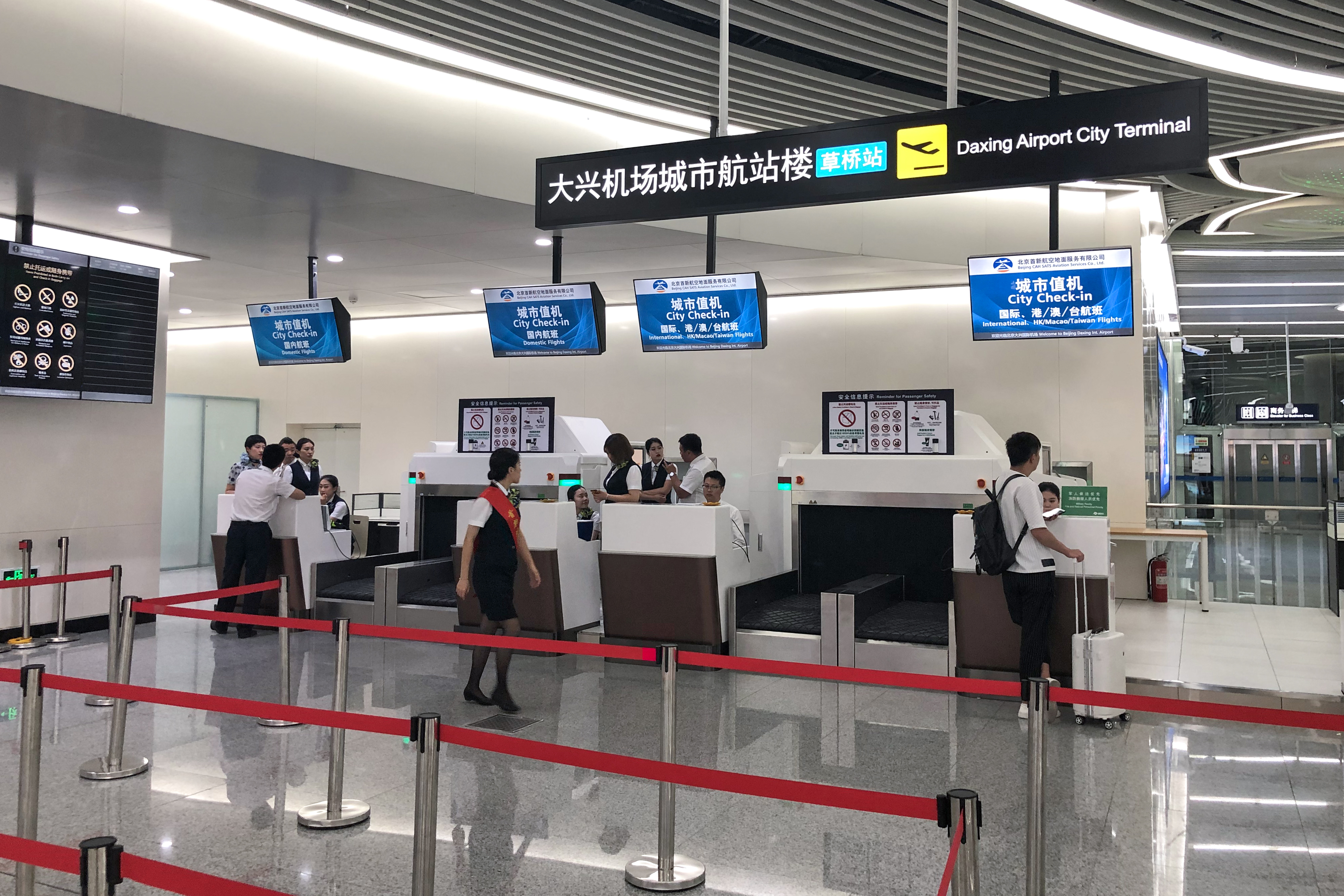
Check-in counters for Daxing Airport Express

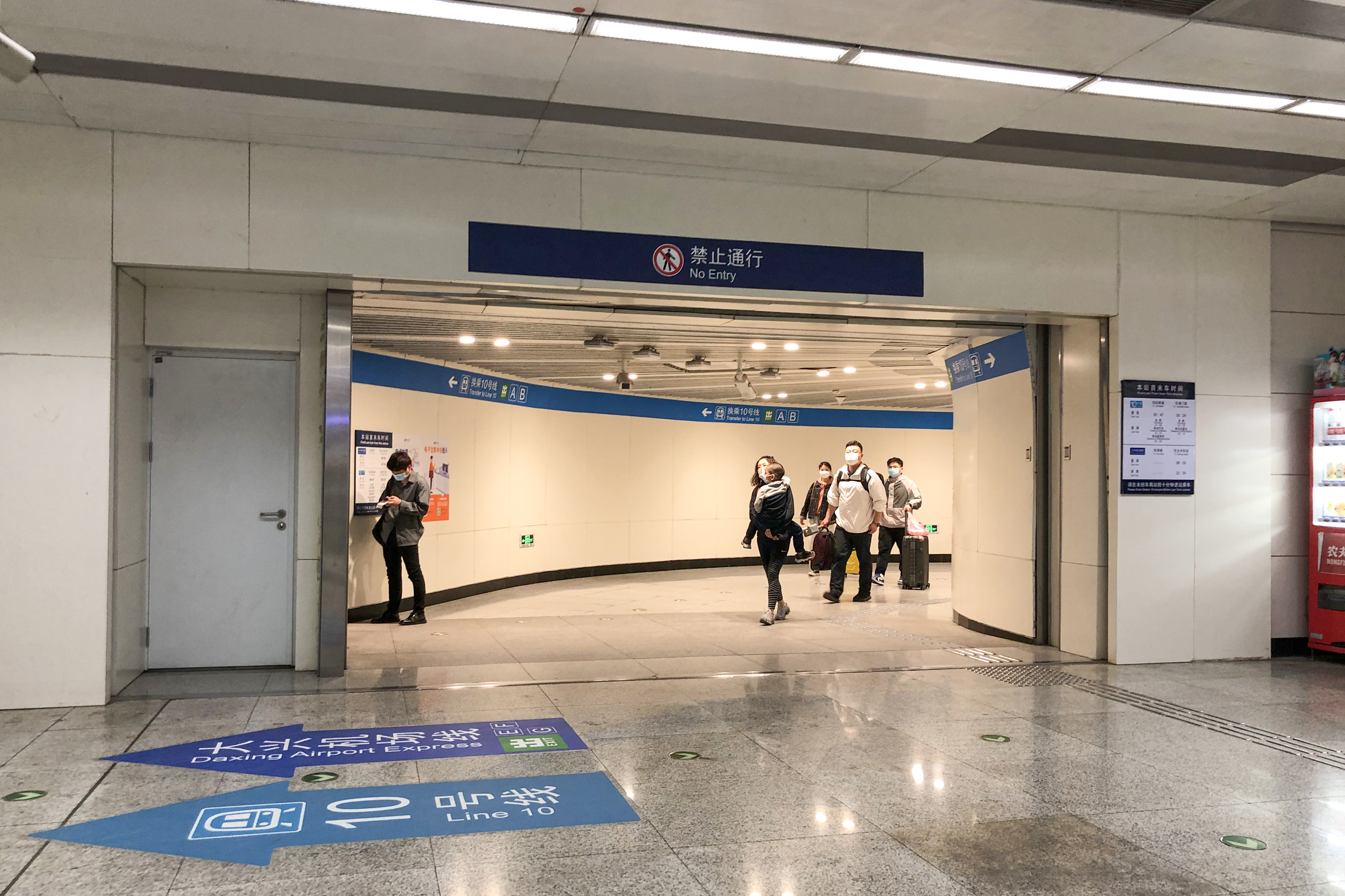
Line 10 west interchange interface

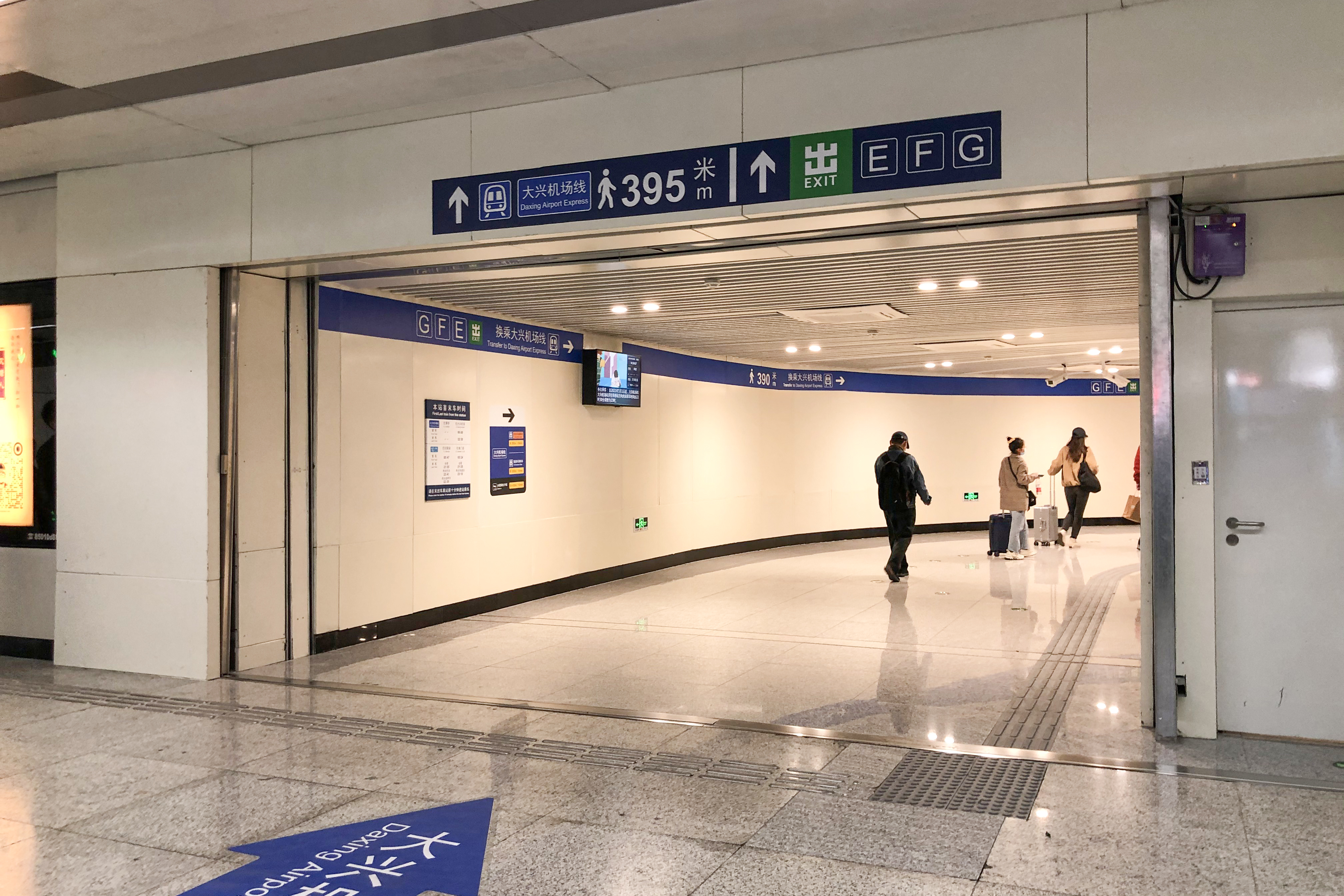
Line 10 central interchange interface

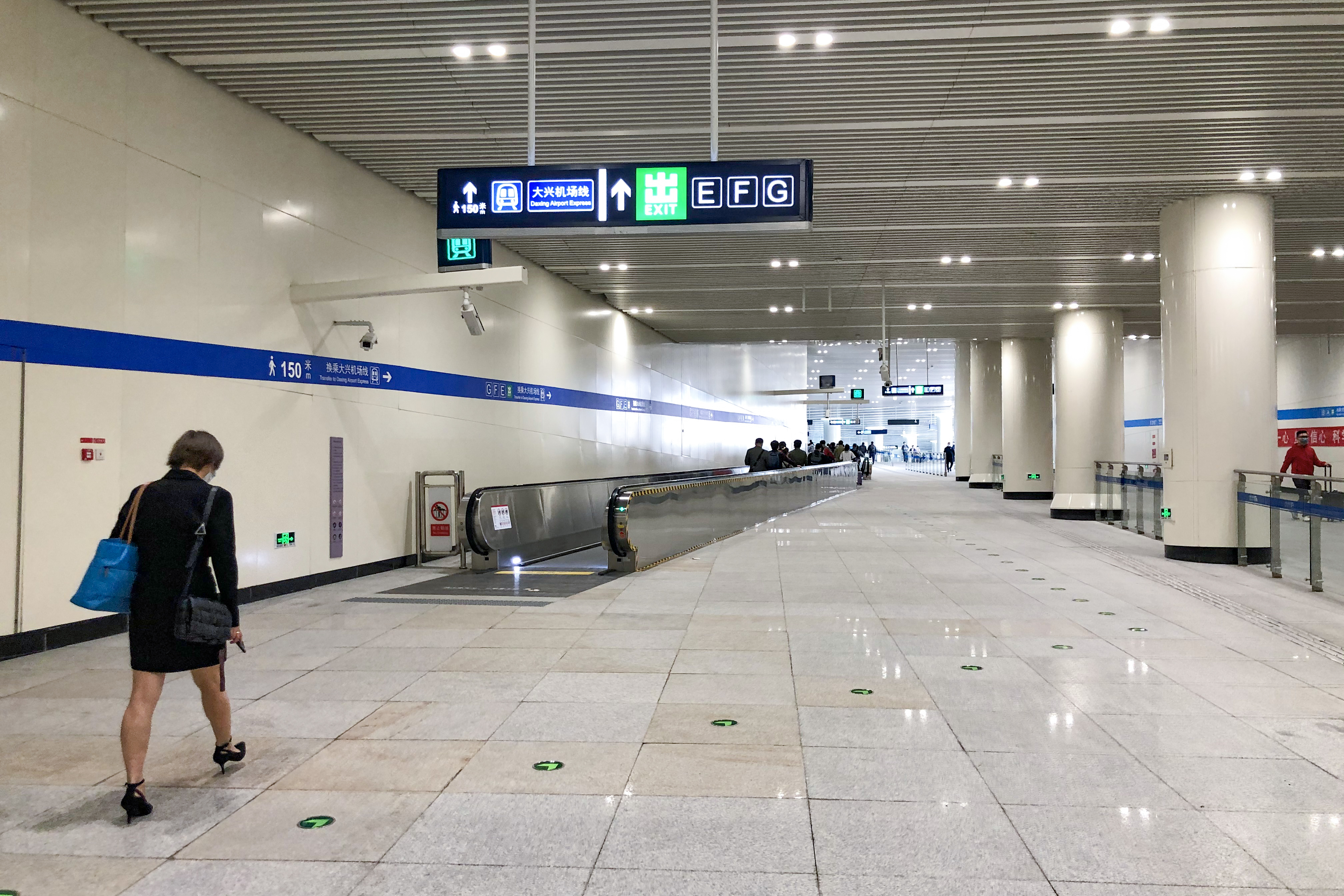
South interchange corridor

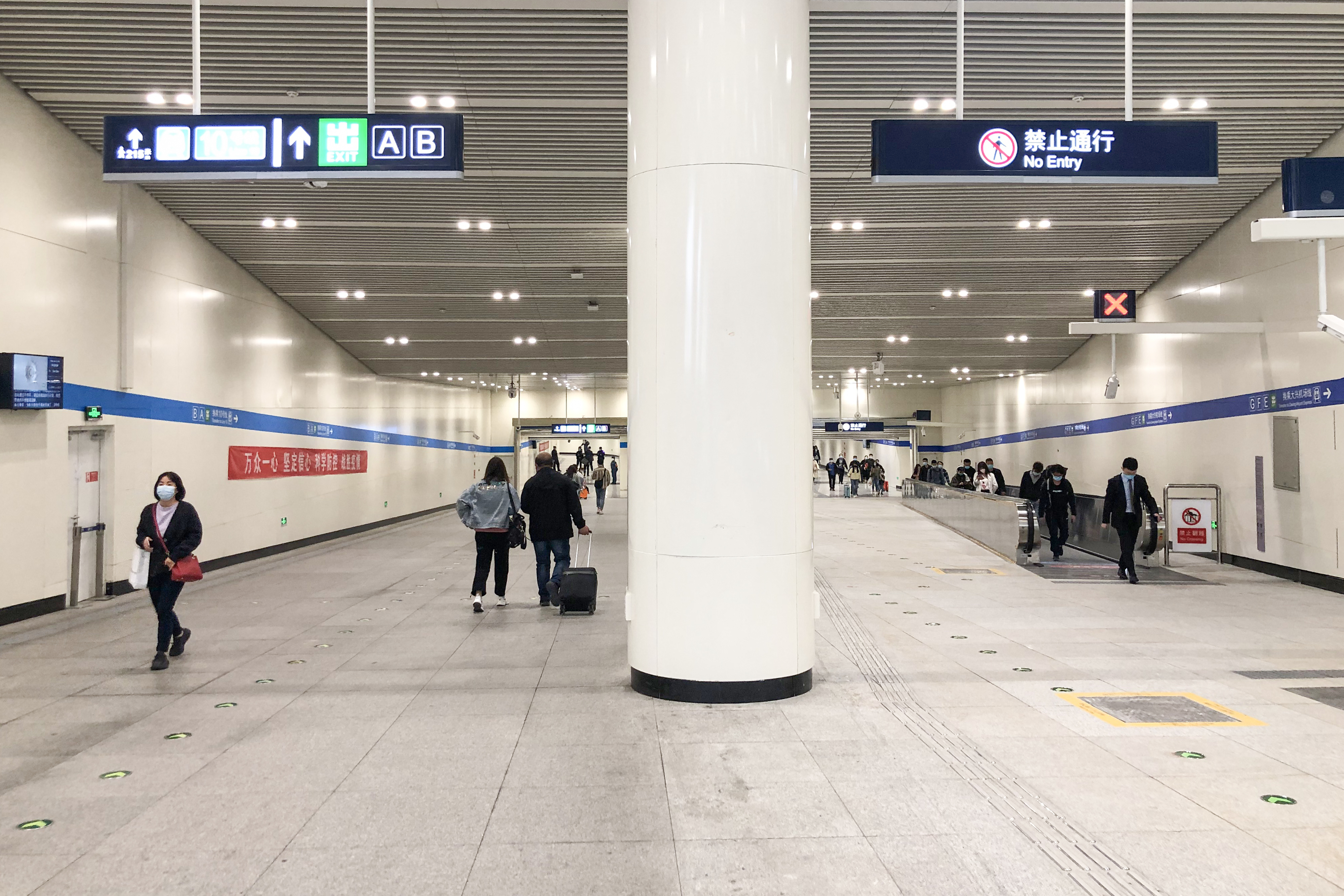
North and south interchange corridors
