= Ping'anli station =

Beijing Subway interchange station

Coordinates: 39.9338°N 116.3729°E

Ping'anli 平安里
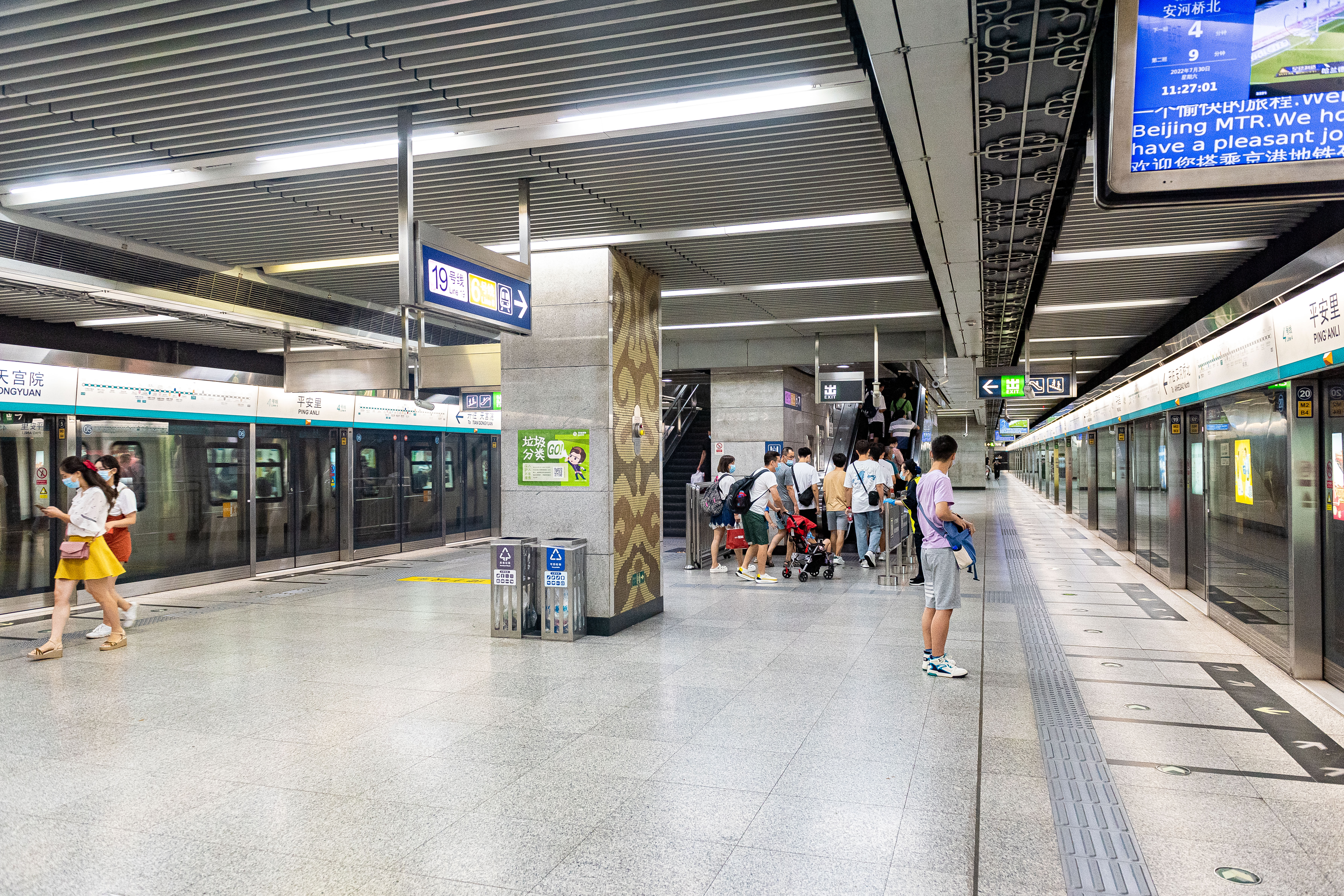
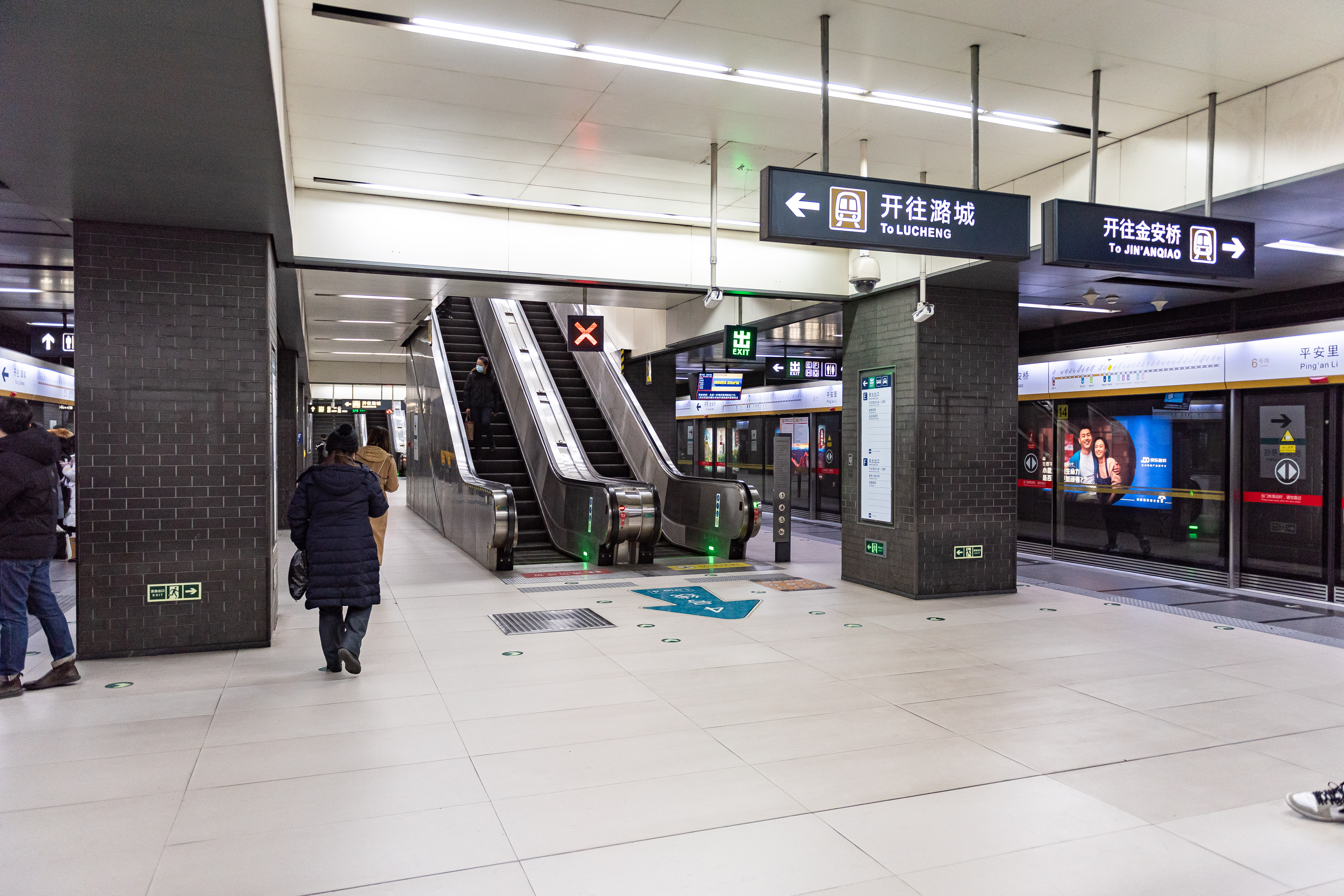
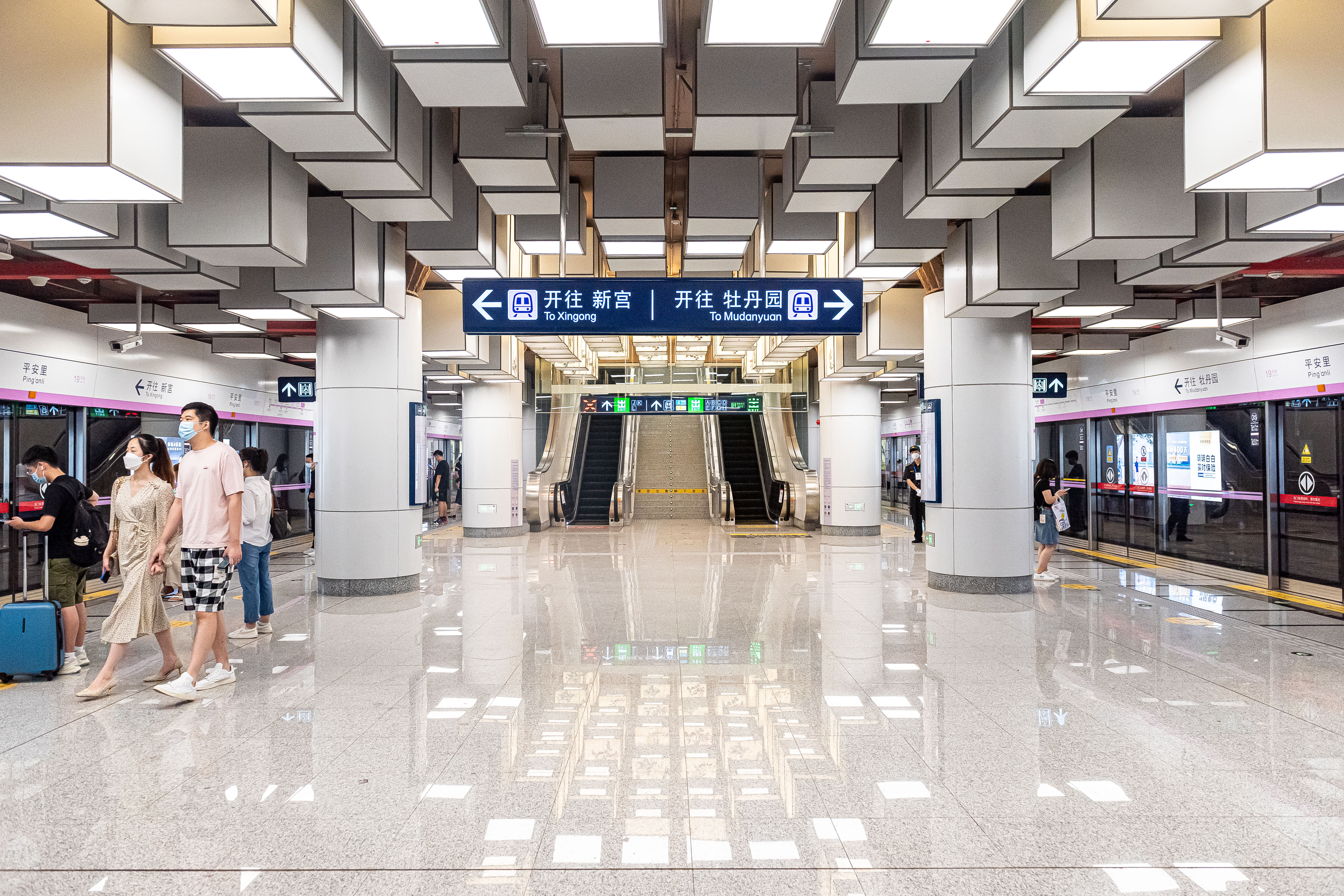
- Line 4 platform Line 6 platform Line 19 platform

General information
- Location: Xinjiekou South Street / Xisi North Street and Ping'anli West Street / Di'anmen West Street; Xicheng District, Beijing; China
- Operator: Beijing MTR Corporation Limited (Line 4); Beijing Mass Transit Railway Operation Corporation Limited (Line 6); Beijing Metro Operation Administration (BJMOA) Corporation Limited (Line 19)
- Lines: Line 4; Line 6; Line 19
- Platforms: 6 (3 island platforms)
- Tracks: 6

Construction
- Structure type: Underground
- Accessible: Yes

History
- Opened: September 28, 2009; 16 years ago (Line 4); December 30, 2012; 13 years ago (Line 6); July 30, 2022; 4 years ago (Line 19)

Services
Preceding station	Beijing Subway	Following station
Xinjie Kou towards Anheqiaobei	Line 4	Xisi towards Tiangong Yuan
Chegongzhuang towards Jin'anqiao	Line 6	Beihaibei towards Luyang
Jishuitan towards Mudanyuan	Line 19	Taipingqiao towards Xingong
Location
- Location within Beijing

Ping'anli station (Chinese: 平安里站; pinyin: Píng'ānlǐ zhàn, also known as PING'ANLI station, Ping'an Li station or Ping'ɑnli Zhɑn) is an interchange station on Line 4, Line 6 and Line 19 of Beijing Subway.

== Station layout ==
Both the lines 4, 6 and 19 stations have underground island platforms.

== Exits ==
There are 11 exits, lettered A, B, C, D, E, F, G, H, J, K, L. Exits B and F are accessible.

== Gallery ==
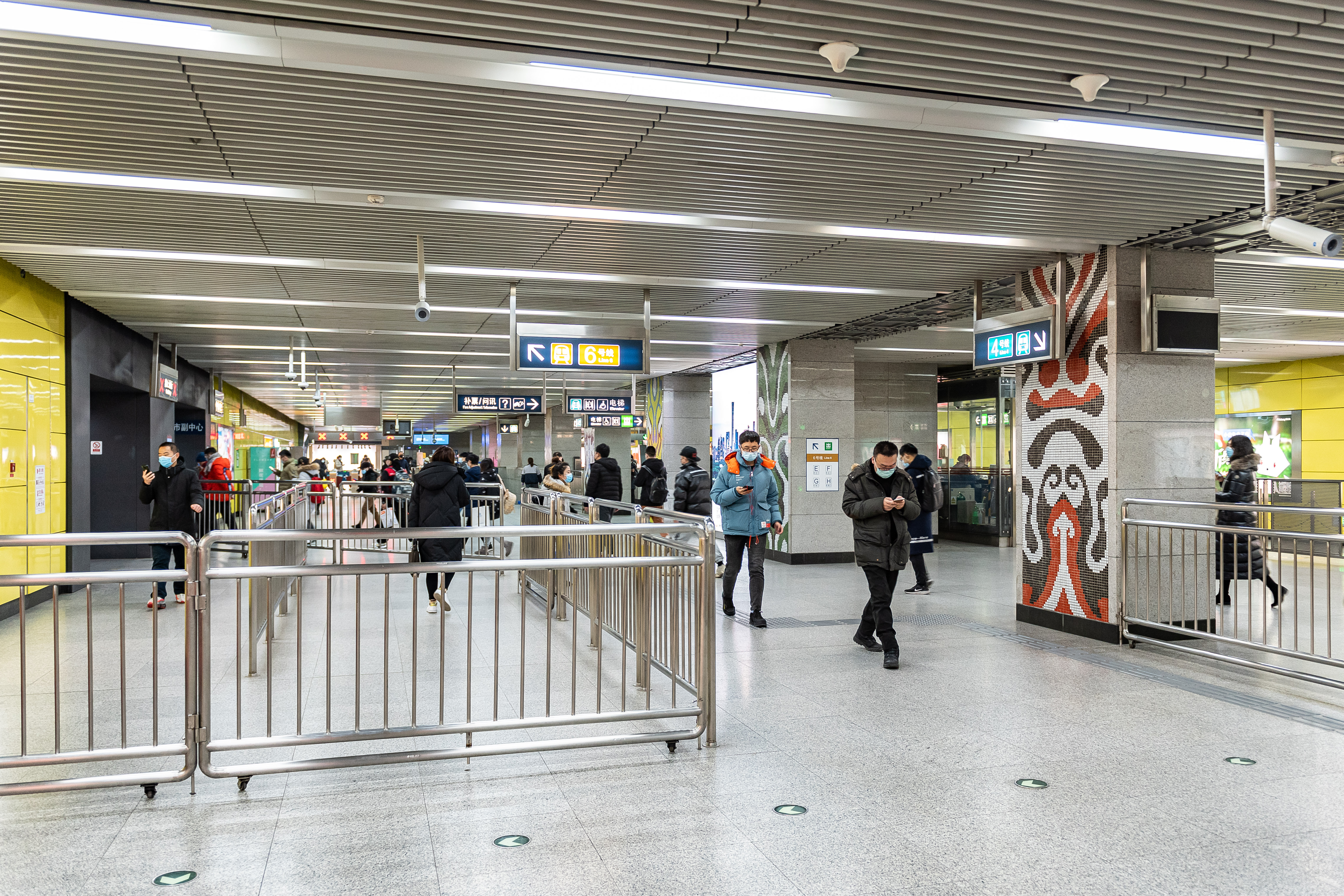
Line 4 concourse

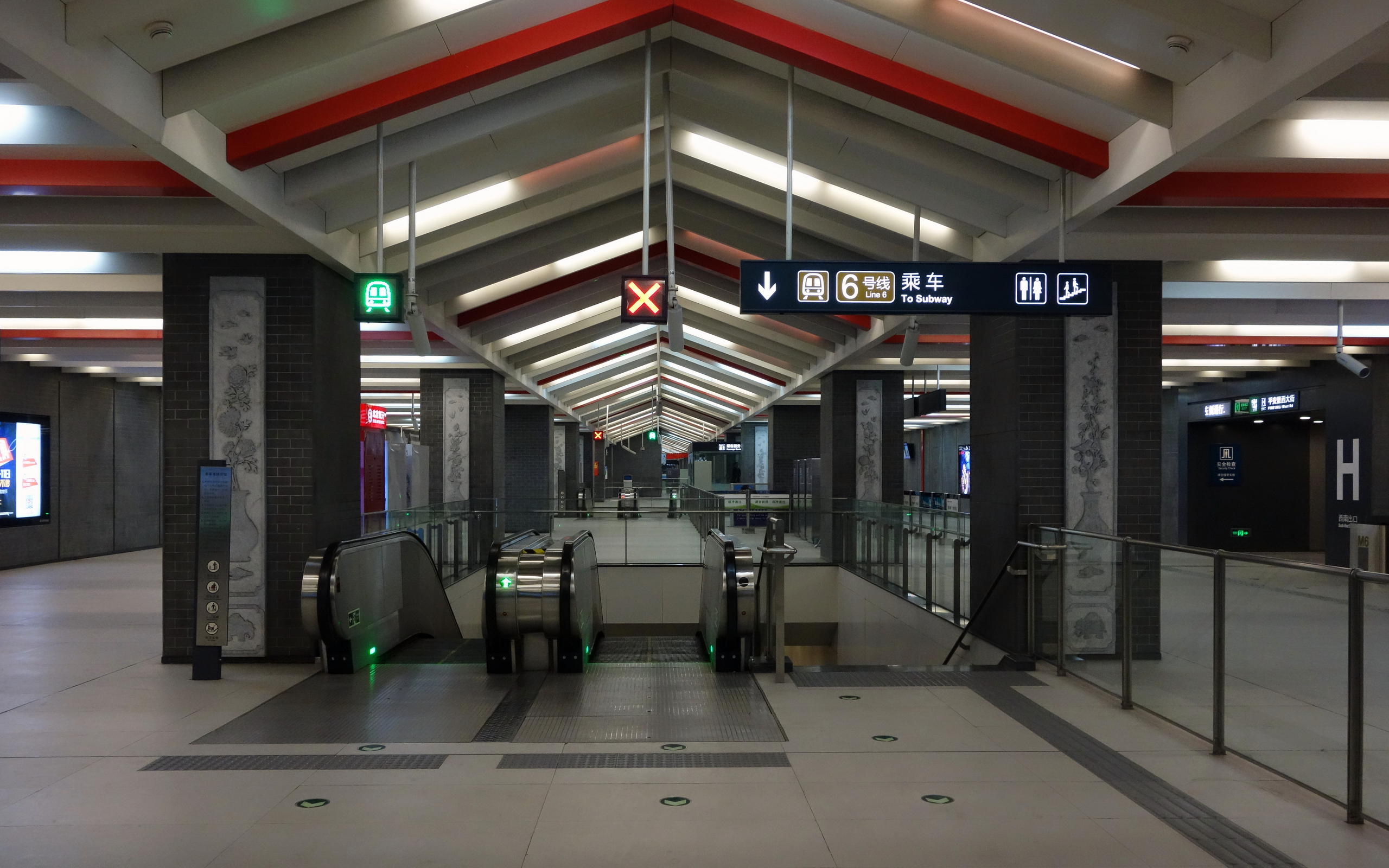
Line 6 concourse (November 2013)

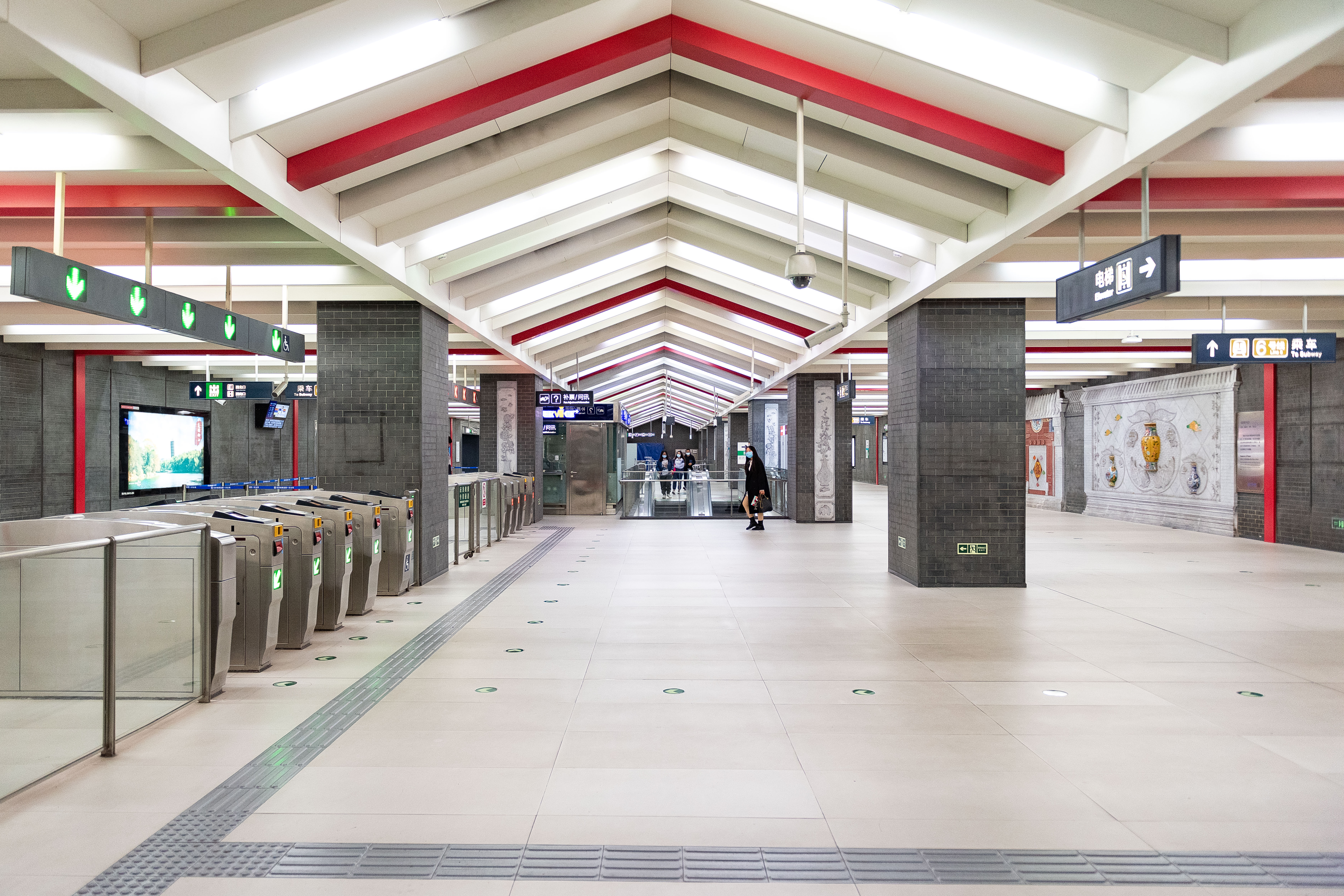
Line 6 concourse (October 2021)

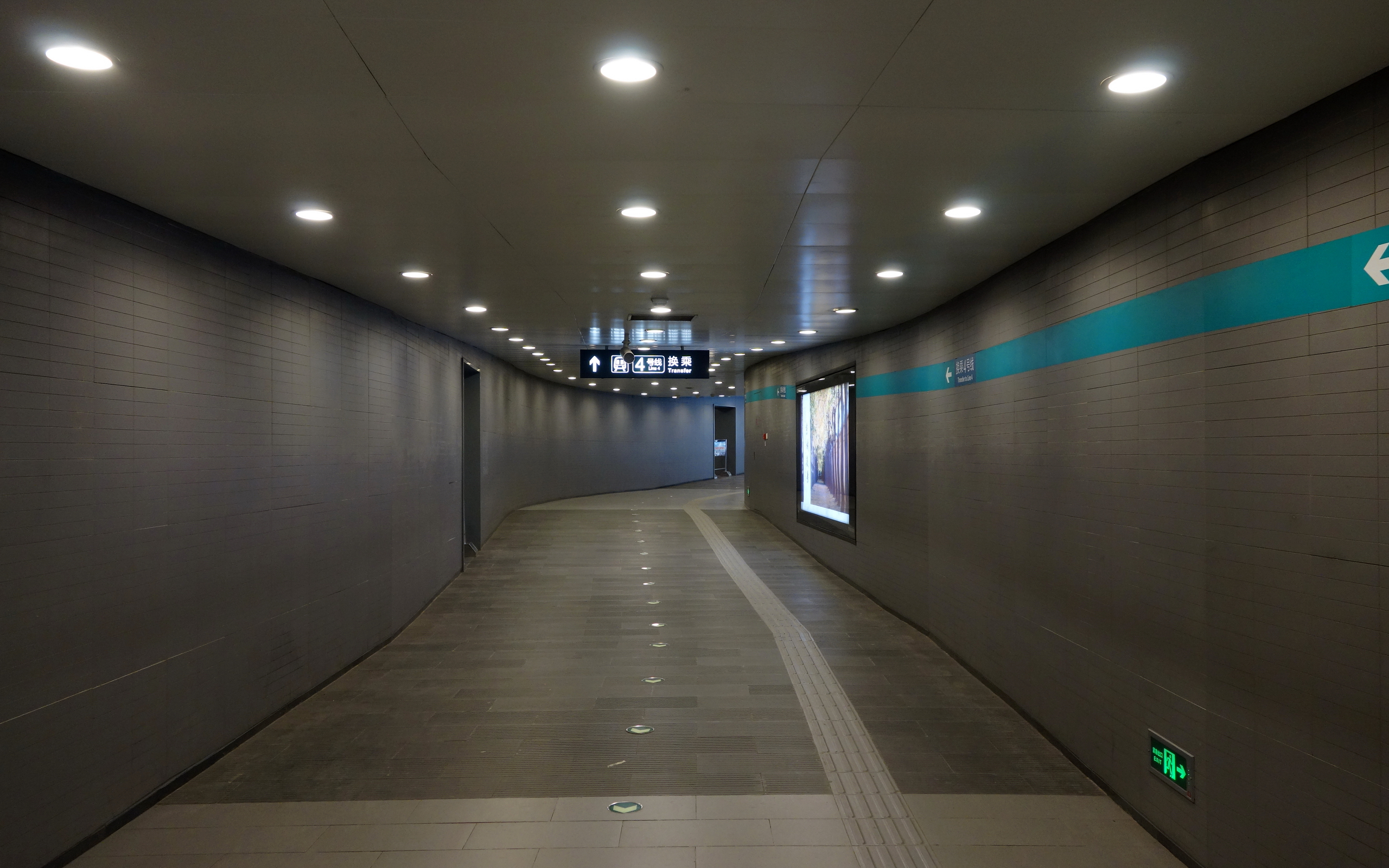
Interchange corridor between Line 4 and Line 6

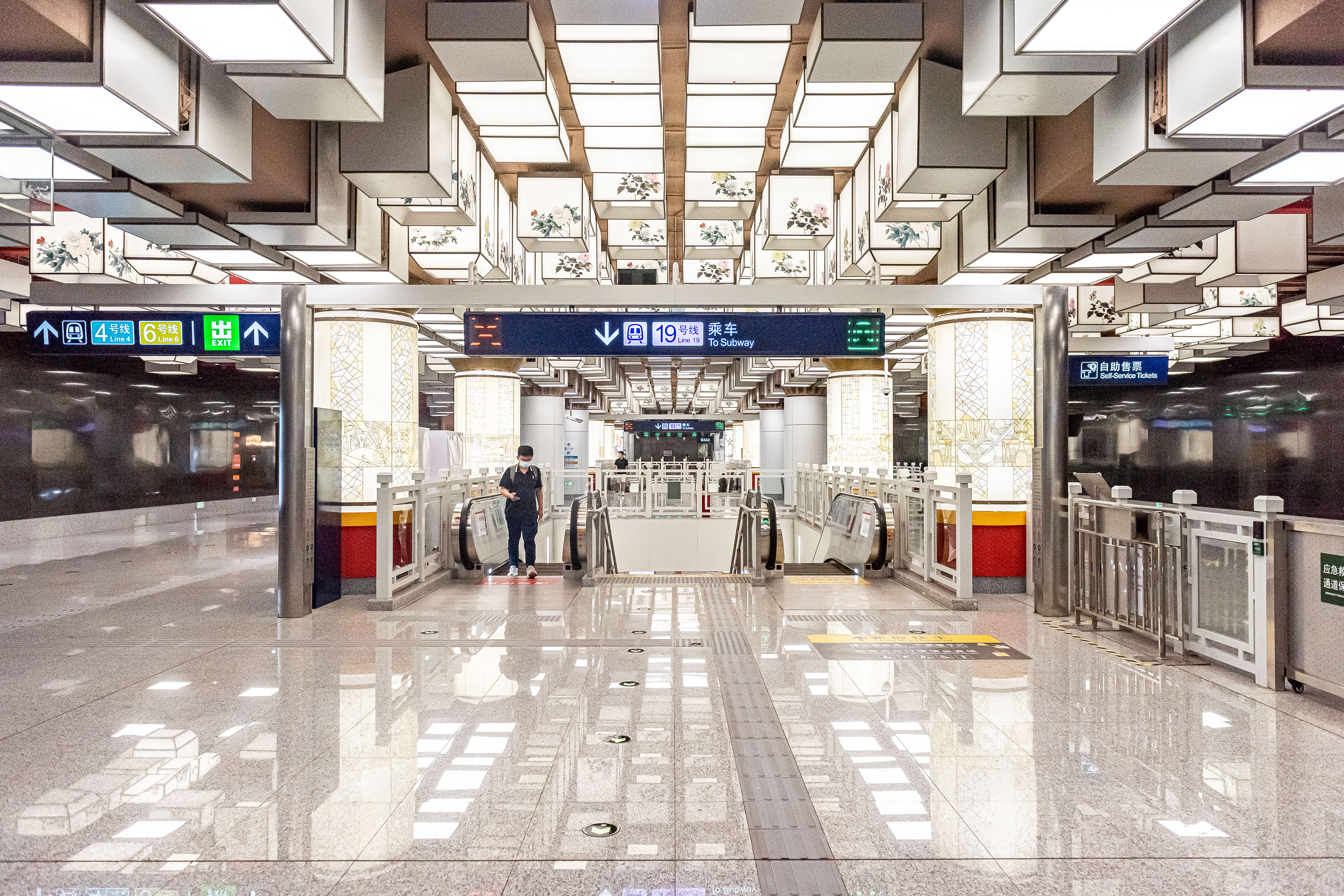
Line 19 concourse

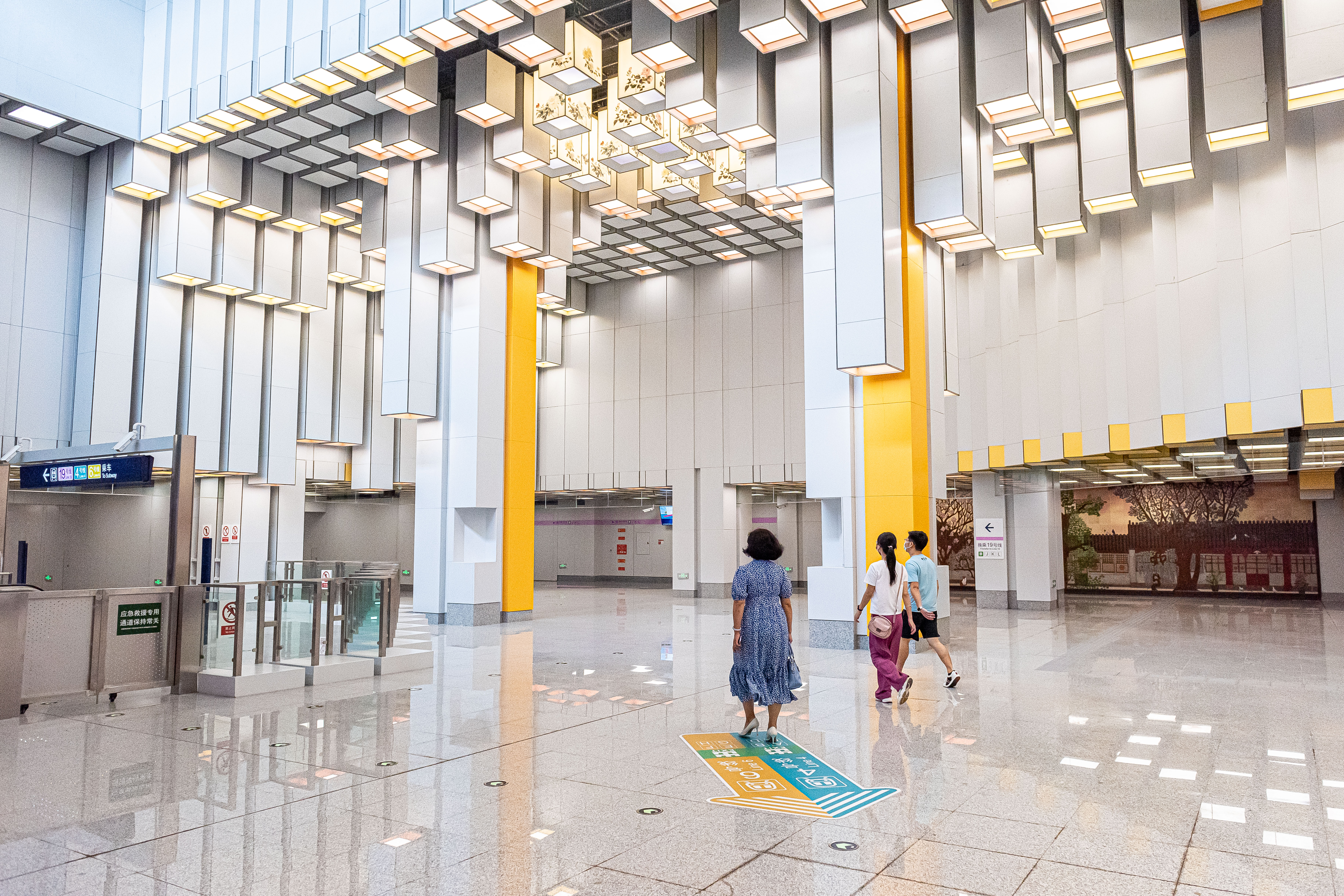
Line 19 interchange hall

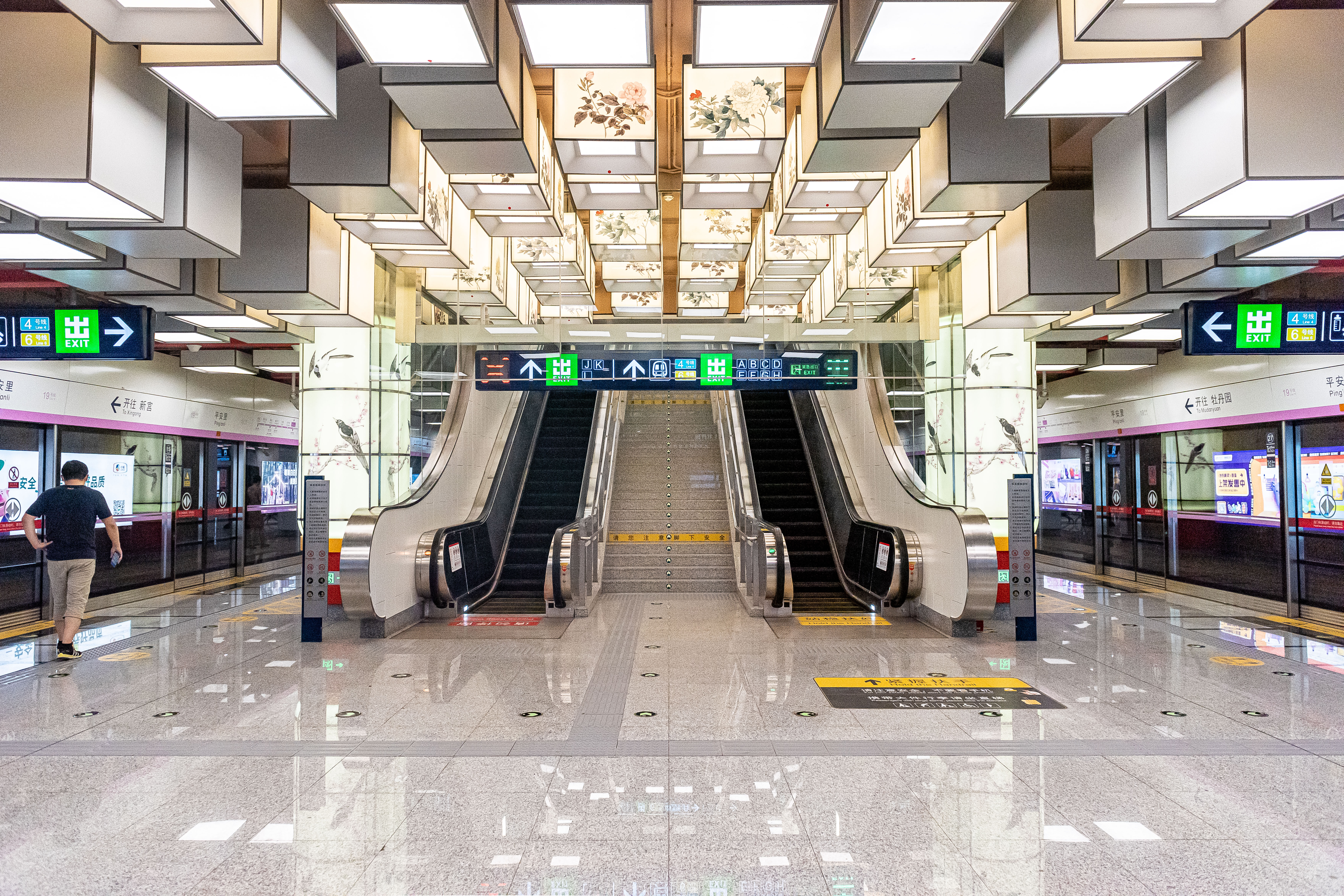
Line 19 platform with decorations
