= Niujie station =

Beijing Subway station

Niujie 牛街
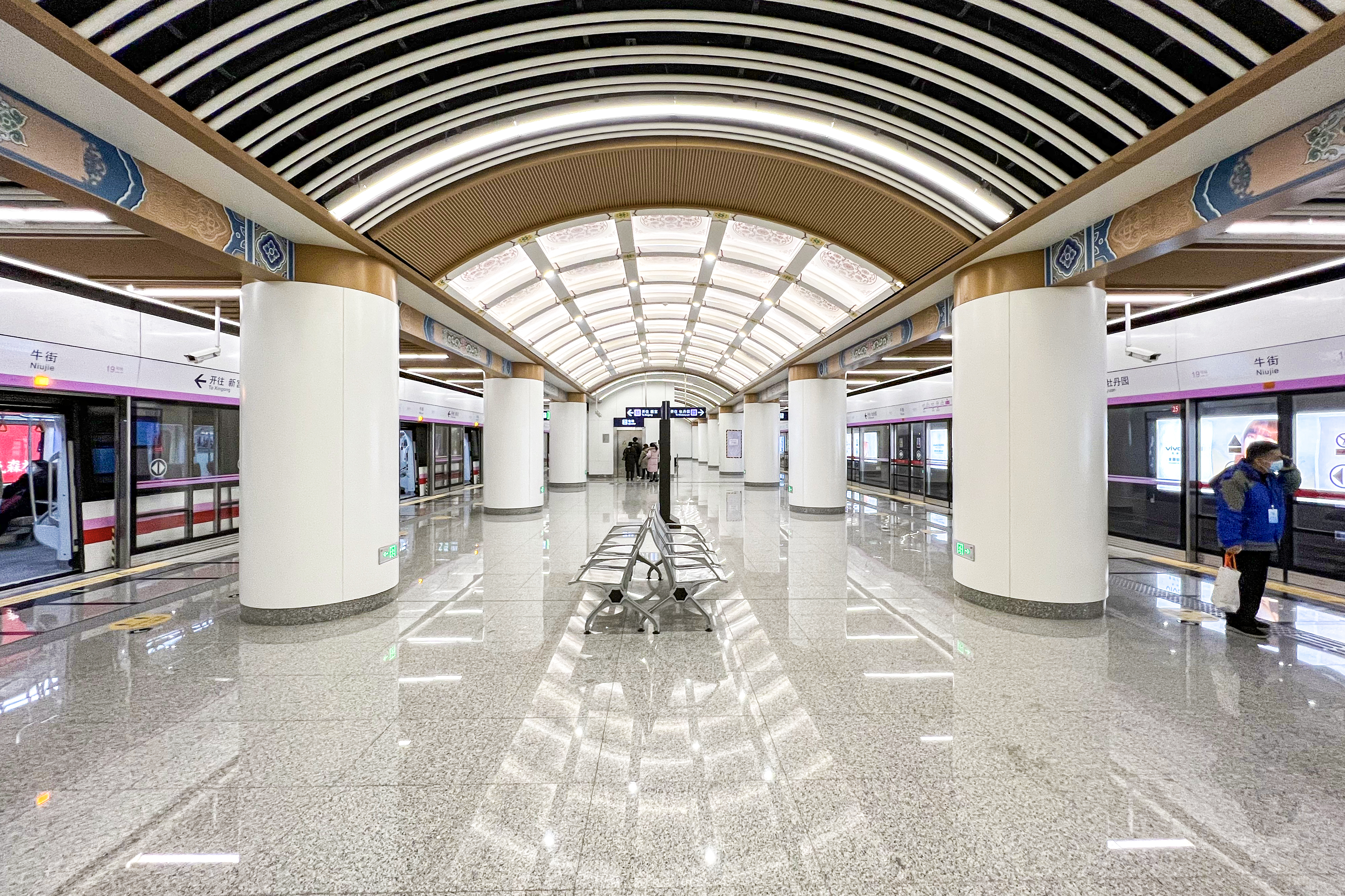
- Platform

General information
- Location: Intersection of Changchun Street and Guang'anmen Inner Street, Guang'anmennei Subdistrict, Xicheng District, Beijing; China
- Operator: Beijing Metro Operation Administration (BJMOA) Corp., Ltd.
- Line: Line 19
- Platforms: 2 (1 island platform)
- Tracks: 2
- Connections: Line 7 (OSI via Guang'anmennei)

Construction
- Structure type: Underground
- Accessible: Yes

History
- Opened: December 31, 2021; 4 years ago

Services
Preceding station	Beijing Subway	Following station
Taipingqiao towards Mudanyuan	Line 19	Jingfengmen towards Xingong
Location
- Location within Beijing

Niujie station (Chinese: 牛街站; pinyin: Niújiē Zhàn) is a subway station on Line 19 of the Beijing Subway. The station opened on December 31, 2021.

== Platform layout ==
The station has an underground island platform.

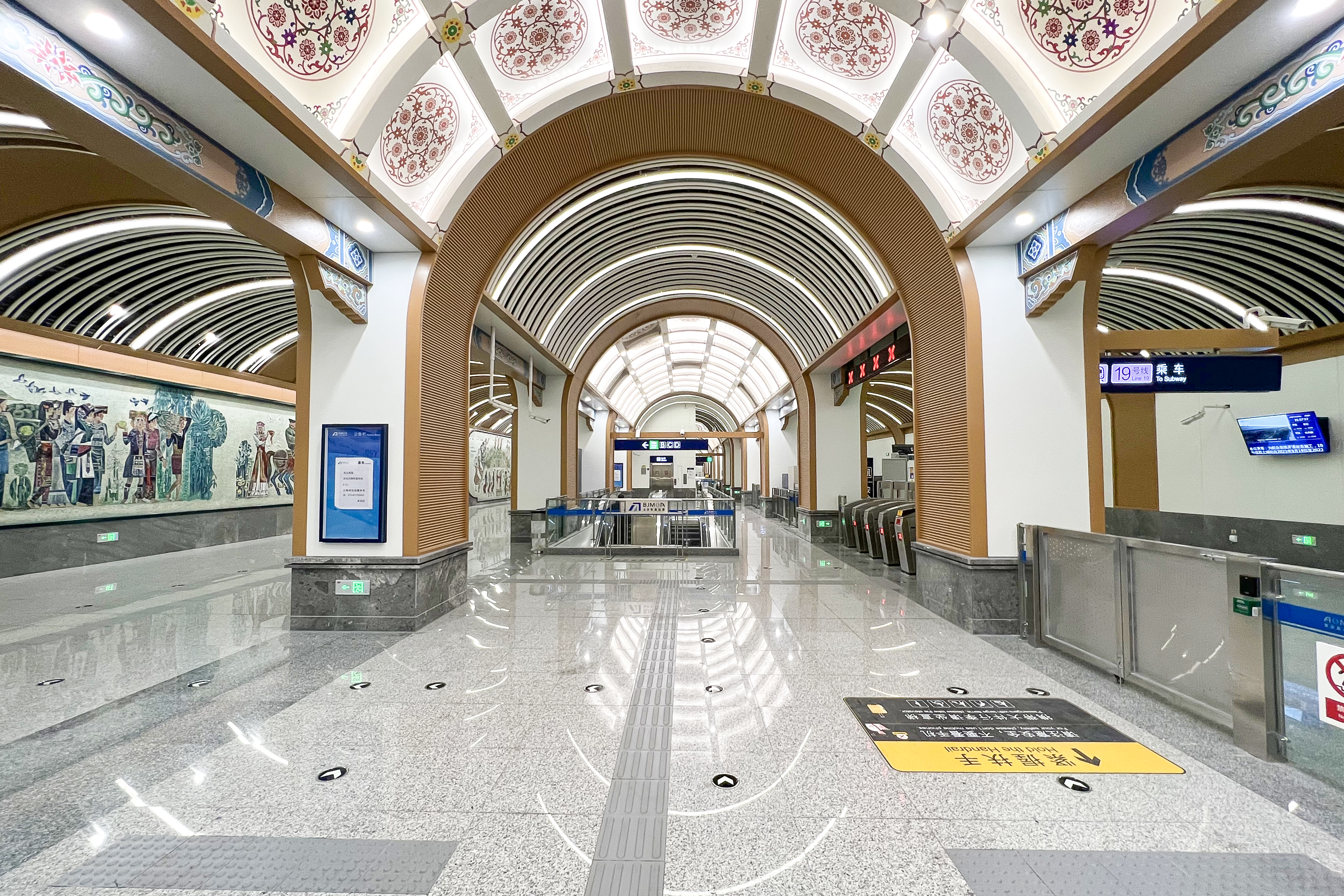
Concourse

== Exits ==
There are 3 exits, lettered B, C and D2. Exit C is accessible as it provides lift access.
