= Xinfadi station =

Beijing Subway station

Xinfadi 新发地
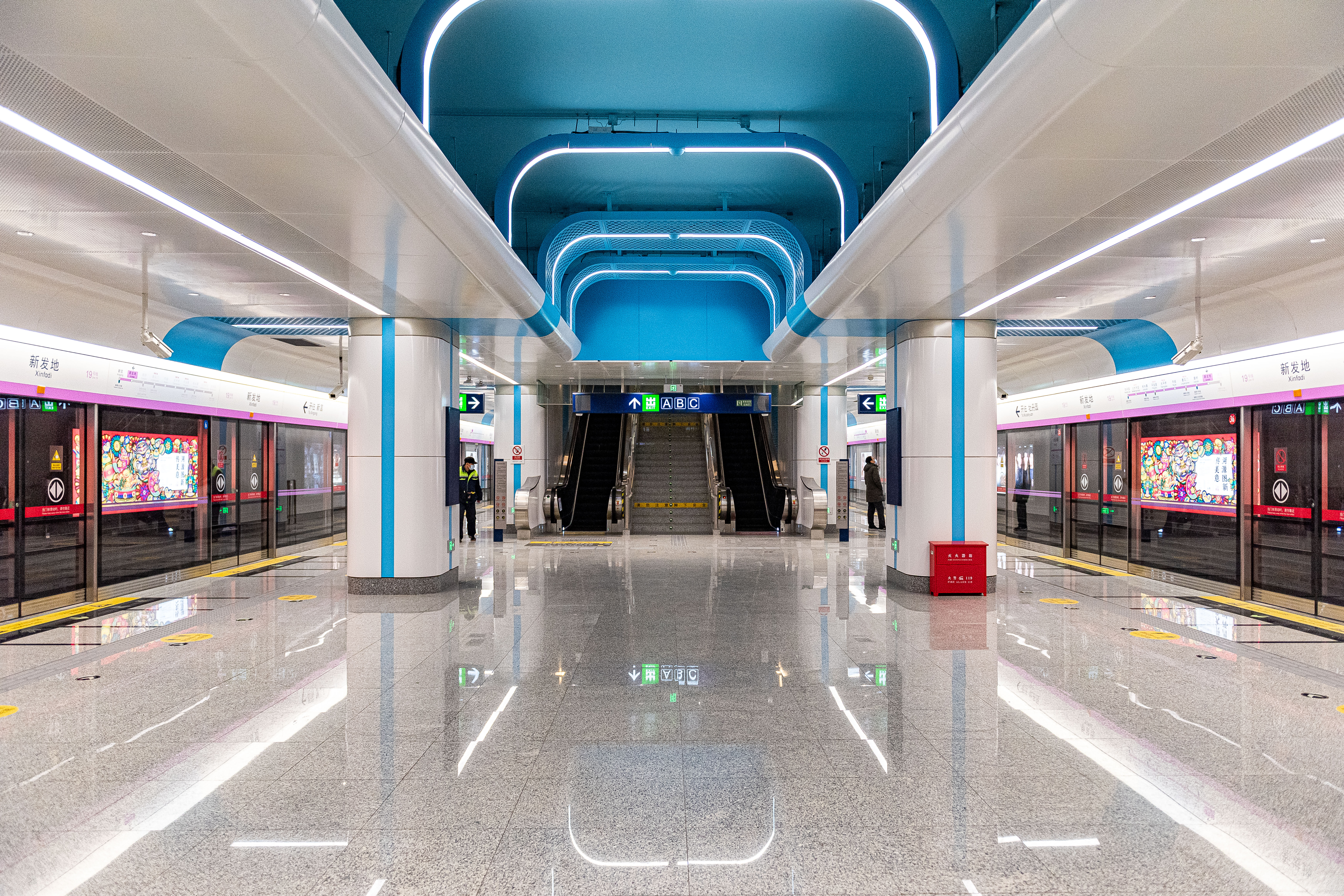

General information
- Location: Intersection of Jingkai Expressway and Nanyuan West Road, Fengtai District, Beijing; China
- Coordinates: 39.82236°N 116.340065°E
- Operator: Beijing Metro Operation Administration (BJMOA) Corp., Ltd.
- Line: Line 19
- Platforms: 2 (1 island platform)
- Tracks: 2

Construction
- Structure type: Underground
- Accessible: Yes

History
- Opened: December 31, 2021

Services
Preceding station	Beijing Subway	Following station
Caoqiao towards Mudanyuan	Line 19	Xingong Terminus
Location
- Location within Beijing

Xinfadi station (Chinese: 新发地站; pinyin: Xīnfādì Zhàn) is a subway station on Line 19 of the Beijing Subway. The station opened on December 31, 2021.

== Platform layout ==
The station has an underground island platform.

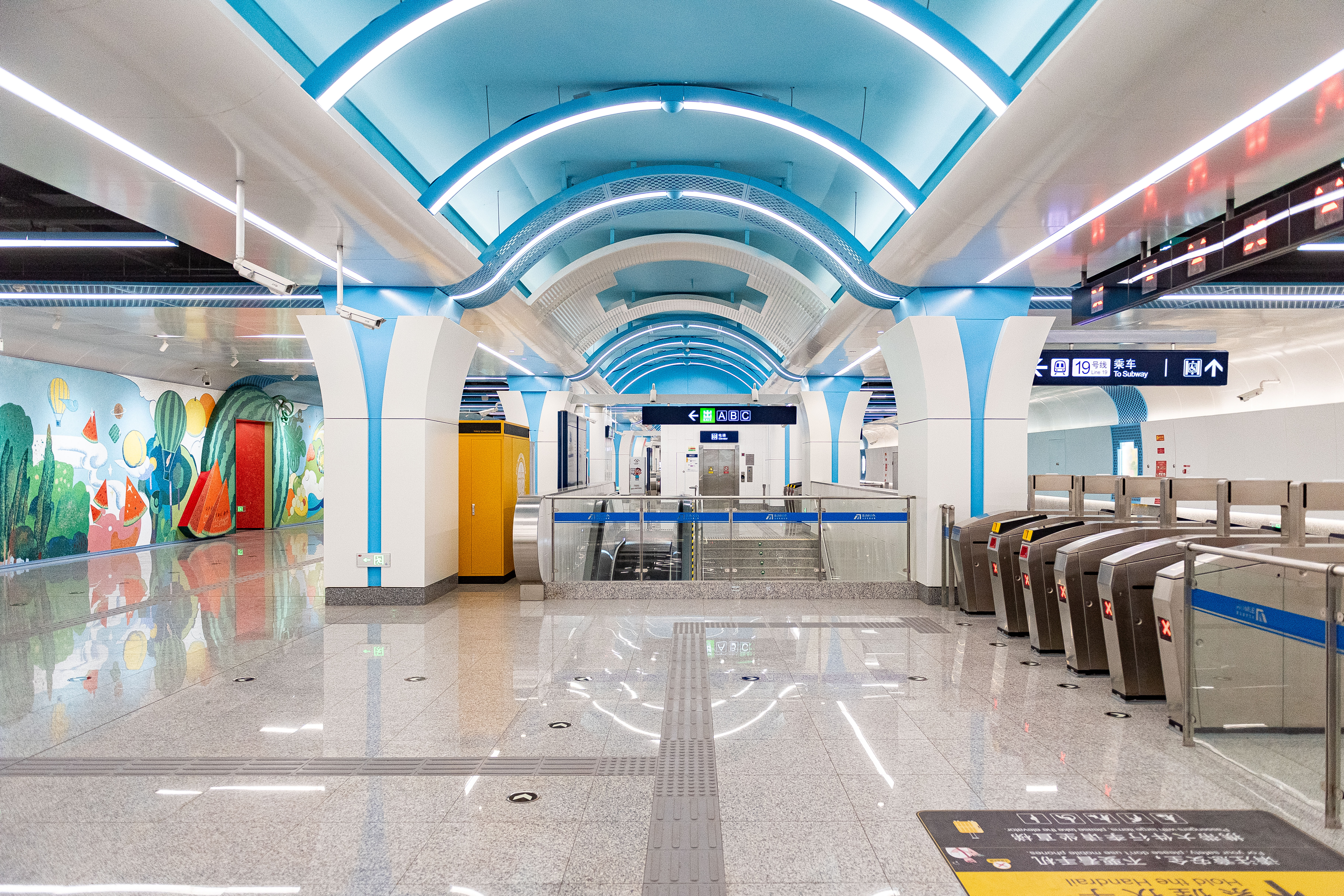
Concourse

== Exits ==
There are 3 exits, lettered A, B and C. Exit B is accessible as it provides lift access.
