= Line 19 (Beijing Subway) =

Metro line of Beijing Subway

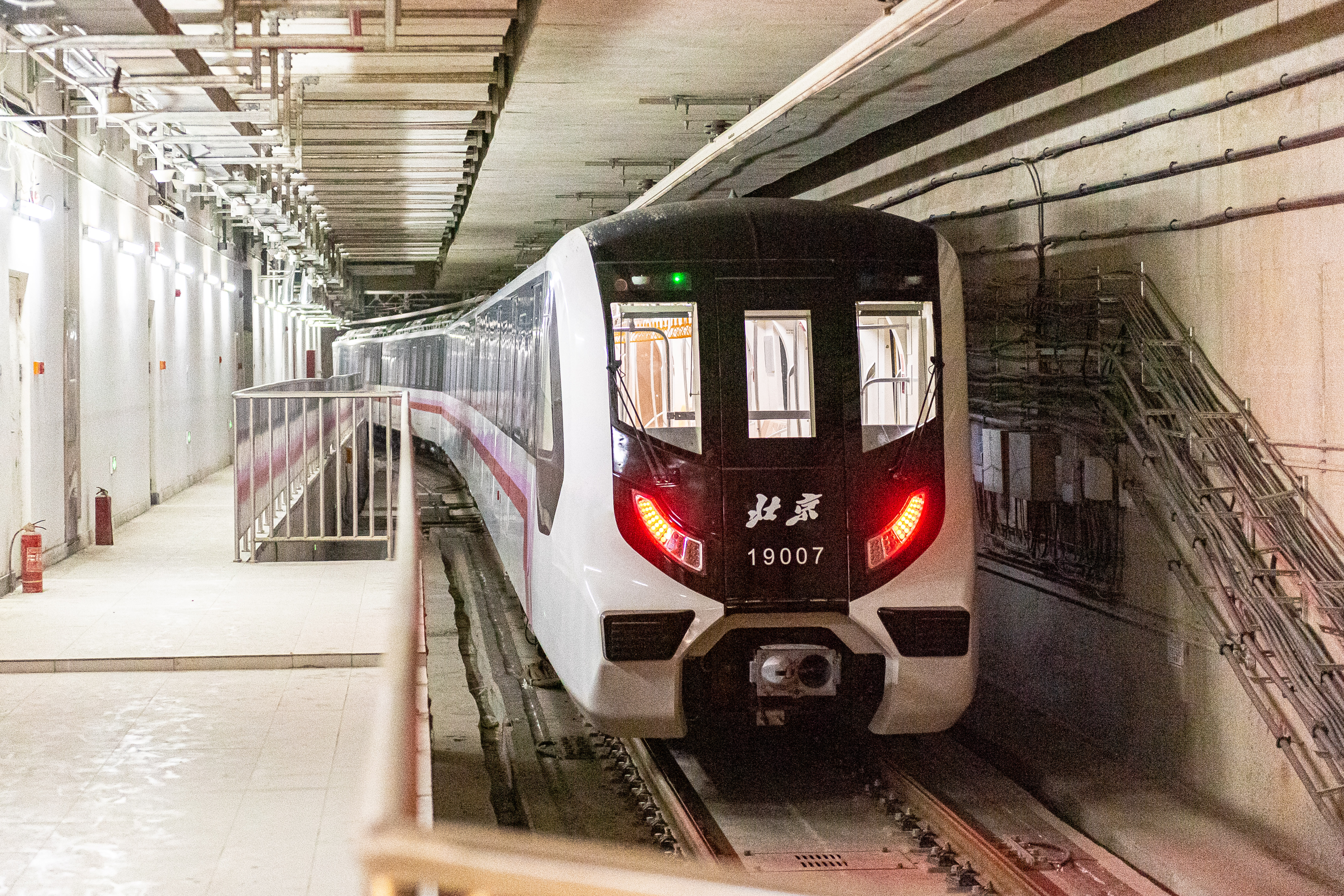
- A Line 19 train leaving Mudanyuan station

Overview
- Other name: M19 / R3 (planned name)
- Status: In operation
- Termini: Mudanyuan; Xingong
- Stations: 10

Service
- Type: Rapid transit
- System: Beijing Subway
- Operator(s): Beijing Metro Operation Administration (BJMOA) Corp., Ltd.
- Depot: Xingong
- Rolling stock: 8-car Type A (CCD5034 and SFM80)
- Daily ridership: 164,700 (2024 Avg.)

History
- Opened: 31 December 2021; 4 years ago

Technical
- Line length: 20.9 km (13.0 mi)
- Character: Fully underground
- Track gauge: 1,435 mm (4 ft 8 1/2 in)
- Operating speed: 100 km/h (62 mph) (Phase 1)

Line 19 of the Beijing Subway (Chinese: 北京地铁19号线; pinyin: Běijīng Dìtiě shíjiǔ hàoxiàn) is a rapid transit line in Beijing. It is 20.9 km (13.0 mi) in length and has 10 stations. It is fully underground. Line 19's color is lavender.

== Description ==
Phase 1 of Line 19 begins at Mudanyuan station in Haidian District and ends at Xingong station in Fengtai District. Phase 1 of Line 19 is 20.9 km (13.0 mi) in length with 10 stations. The line was envisioned as a major relief line for the overcrowded Line 4 and more direct link to the Beijing Financial Street commercial area.

The line uses 8-car type A rolling stock.

The trains have a maximum speed of 120 km/h (75 mph). However the speed limit of the first phase, which runs under the dense city center is 100 km/h (62 mph). Phase II extensions north and south run through suburban areas and will be built to more generous alignments allowing for 120 km/h (75 mph) operations.

== Opening timeline ==
Segment	Commencement	Length	Station(s)	Name
Mudanyuan — Xingong	31 December 2021	20.9 km (13.0 mi)	6	Phase 1
Beitaipingzhuang, Ping'anli, Taipingqiao, Jingfengmen	30 July 2022	20.9 km (13.0 mi)	4	Infill stations of Phase 1

== Stations ==
=== Main ===
Station Name		Connections	Nearby Bus Stops	Distance km		Location
English	Chinese	Connections	Nearby Bus Stops	Distance km		Location
Shengminggu Railway Station	生命谷	Northeast Ring (S7); S15				Changping
Life Science Park South	生命科学园南					Changping
Longzexi	龙泽西	Northeast Ring (S7); 13 18				Changping
Xisanqi	西三旗					Changping / Haidian
Qinghe Xiaoyingqiao	清河小营桥	Changping				Haidian
Shangqingqiaonan	上清桥南	19 (North Branch)				Haidian
Beishatan	北沙滩	15				Haidian
Mudanyuan	牡丹园	10	16 21 22 47 123 135 331 345快 425 508 510 579 601 606 618 620 645 653 658 夜4 专32	0.000	0.000	Haidian
Beitaipingzhuang	北太平庄	12	16 22 47 88 123 135 300 300快 302 315 331 345快 361 368 387 425 508 510 579 604 606 618 620 645 671 695 883 885 886 886区 921 快速直达专线66 快速直达专线148 夜4 夜30 夜38	0.920	0.920	Haidian / Xicheng
Jishuitan	积水潭	2	5 22 27 44 47 55 80 88 135 143 200 331 344 345 345快 347 380 409 508 604 618 620 625 670 883 885 886 886区 919快 观光3 快速直达专线12 快速直达专线66 快速直达专线124 快速直达专线125 快速直达专线128 快速直达专线134 快速直达专线148 快速直达专线214 通医专线2 夜2 夜4 夜20 夜36 夜38 专31 专51 专168	2.450	3.370	Xicheng
Ping'anli	平安里	4 6	4 7 13 22 38 47 88 105 107 111 118 143 409 夜3 夜4 夜36	1.590	4.960	Xicheng
Taipingqiao	太平桥	1 2 (Out-of-system interchange via Fuxingmen)	7 10 15 38 47 52 88 快速直达专线168 夜1 夜36	2.710	7.670	Xicheng
Niujie	牛街	7 (Out-of-system interchange via Guang'anmen Nei)	5 6 10 38 48 50 57 88 109 381 通医专线1 夜7 夜23 专13	1.240	9.810	Xicheng
Jingfengmen	景风门	14	14 48 88 454 474 专155	2.960	12.770	Fengtai
Caoqiao	草桥	10 Daxing Airport	381 410 423 434 456 483 497 529 676 679 专179 专209	2.680	15.450	Fengtai
Xinfadi	新发地		353 354 377 381 410 423 454 483 497 529 646 676 679 快速直达专线22 专190	2.650	18.100	Fengtai
Xingong	新宫	Daxing	343 353 354 369 400 474 556 827 829 946 954 快速直达专线22 专59 专67 专190 专199	2.740	20.840	Fengtai
Xingongnan	新宫南					Fengtai
Xihongmendong	西红门东					Daxing
New Media Industrial Base	新媒体产业基地					Daxing
Guanyinsi	观音寺					Daxing
Cigezhuangxi	磁各庄西					Daxing
Haizijiao	海子角					Daxing

=== North Branch ===
Station Name		Connections	Nearby Bus Stops	Distance km	Location
English	Chinese	Connections	Nearby Bus Stops	Distance km	Location
Qinghe railway station	清河站	Huairou–Miyun; 13 Changping			Haidian
Shangqingqiaonan	上清桥南	19 (Main)			Haidian

== History ==
It was reported in February 2012 as one of six new lines under planning by the city's public transit planning authorities. As of 2015, the line was renamed to Line 19 with the first phase starting construction in 2016. The line opened on 31 December 2021. Four infill stations opened on 30 July 2022.

== Future development ==
Phase 2 of Line 19, which is under planning, consists of a northern extension to Changping District. Additionally, there will be a branch line of the northern extension, which will serve the new Qinghe railway station, a station on the Beijing–Zhangjiakou intercity railway. On 11 January 2022, the second phase of Line 19 was listed as one of the 10 construction projects in the "Beijing Rail Transit Phase III Construction Plan (2022-2027)".

On 8 July 2022, an EIA document regarding Phase III construction of Beijing rail transport system (2022–2027) expanded the phase 2 planning. The northern extension will start from Mudanyuan and run to Life Valley as a 17.6 km (10.9 mi) long section with 6 new stations. A branch of the northern extension will run from Shangqingqiao South to Qinghe railway station for 6.8 km (4.2 mi) with one new station. Additionally, a southern extension was announced from Xingong to Haizijiao as a 12.6 km (7.8 mi) long section with 6 new stations along with a branch of the southern extension from Xinmeiti Chanye Jidi to Shengwu Yiyao Jidi West which will be 17.4 km (10.8 mi) long with 7 new stations.

On 28 April 2024, Beijing Infrastructure Investment (BII) announced the northern extension and its branch, as well as southern extension. On 29 July, BII published the first EIA analysis to confirm these 3 parts.
