= Xingong station =

Beijing Subway interchange station

Xingong 新宫
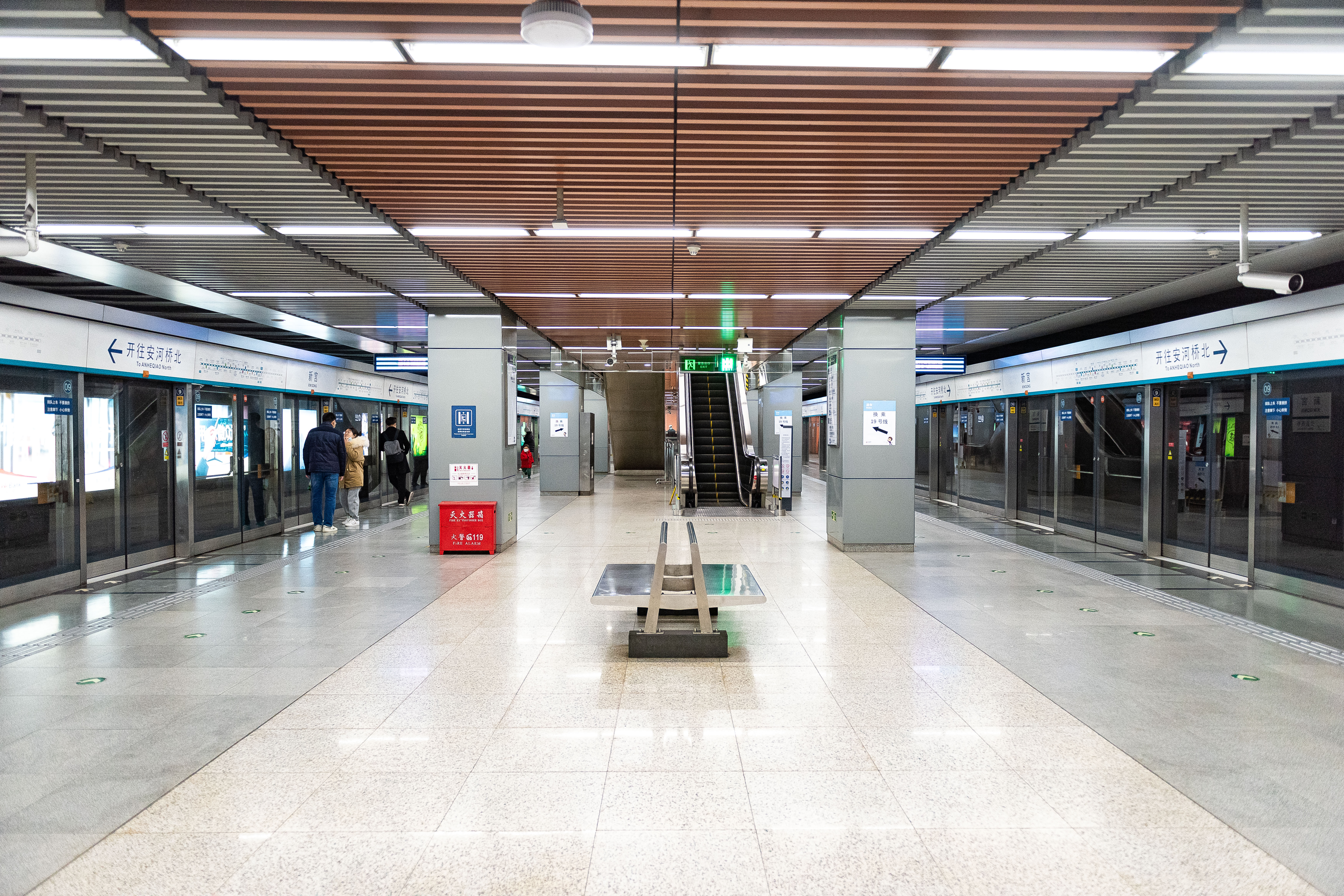
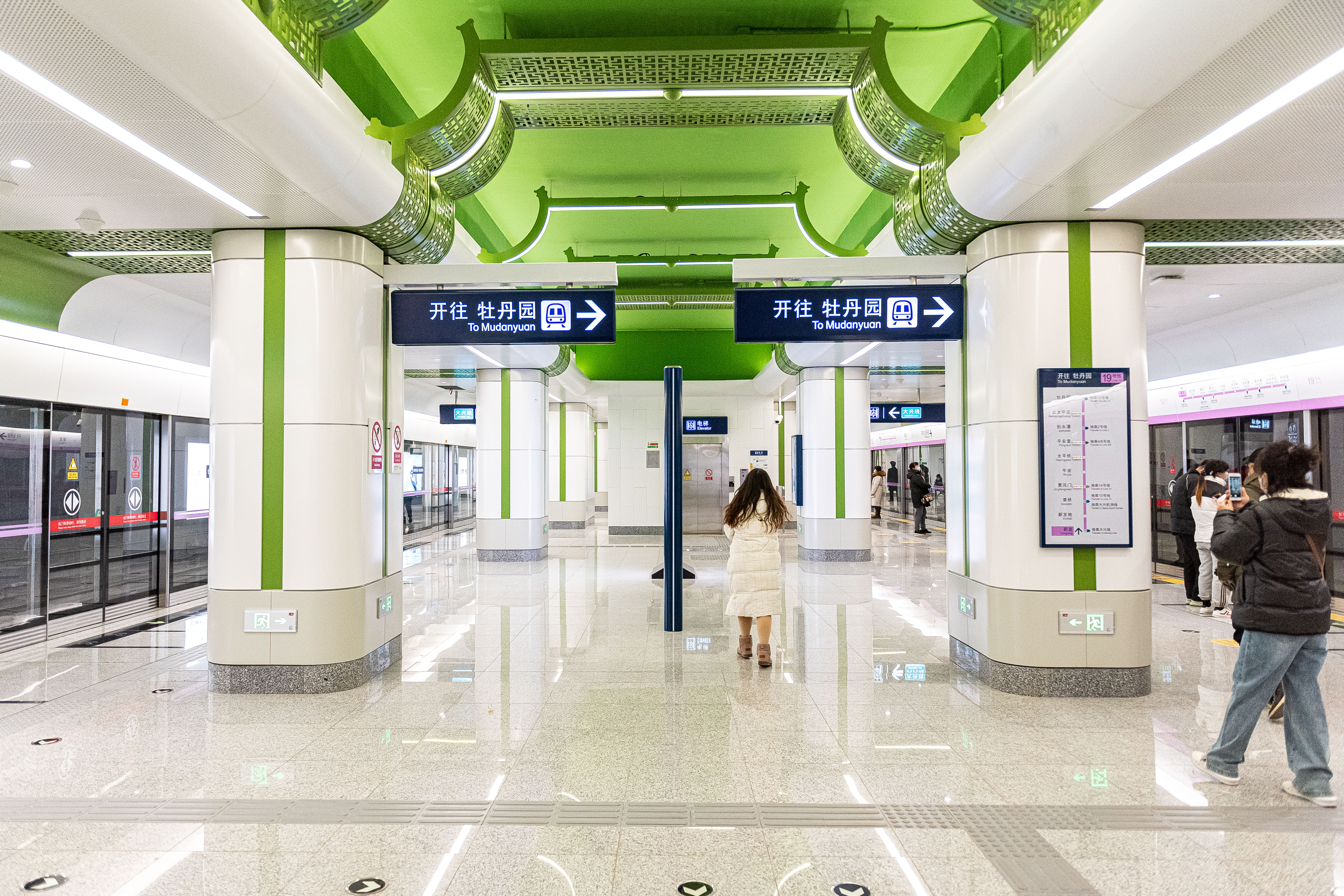
- Daxing line northbound platform Line 19 originating platform

General information
- Location: Huaifang West Road (槐房西路) and Xingongshangye 2nd Street (新宫商业二街) Nanyuan, Fengtai District, Beijing; China
- Coordinates: 39°48′45″N 116°21′56″E
- Operator: Beijing MTR Corporation Limited (Daxing line); Beijing Metro Operation Administration (BJMOA) Corp., Ltd. (Line 19)
- Lines: Daxing line Line 19
- Platforms: 8 (4 island platforms)
- Tracks: 8

Construction
- Structure type: Underground
- Accessible: Yes

History
- Opened: December 30, 2010; 15 years ago (Daxing line); December 31, 2021; 4 years ago (Line 19)

Services
Preceding station	Beijing Subway	Following station
Gongyi Xiqiao towards Anheqiaobei	Daxing line	Xihong Men towards Tiangongyuan
Xinfadi towards Mudanyuan	Line 19	Terminus
Location
- Location within Beijing

Xingong Station (simplified Chinese: 新宫站; traditional Chinese: 新宮站; pinyin: Xīngōng Zhàn, also known as XIN'GONG station or Xingong Zhɑn) is a station on the Daxing line and Line 19 of the Beijing Subway.

== Station layout ==
The station has underground dual-island platforms for both Daxing line and line 19.

== Exits ==
There are 7 exits, lettered A, B, C, D, E, F and G. Exits B and E are accessible.

== Gallery ==
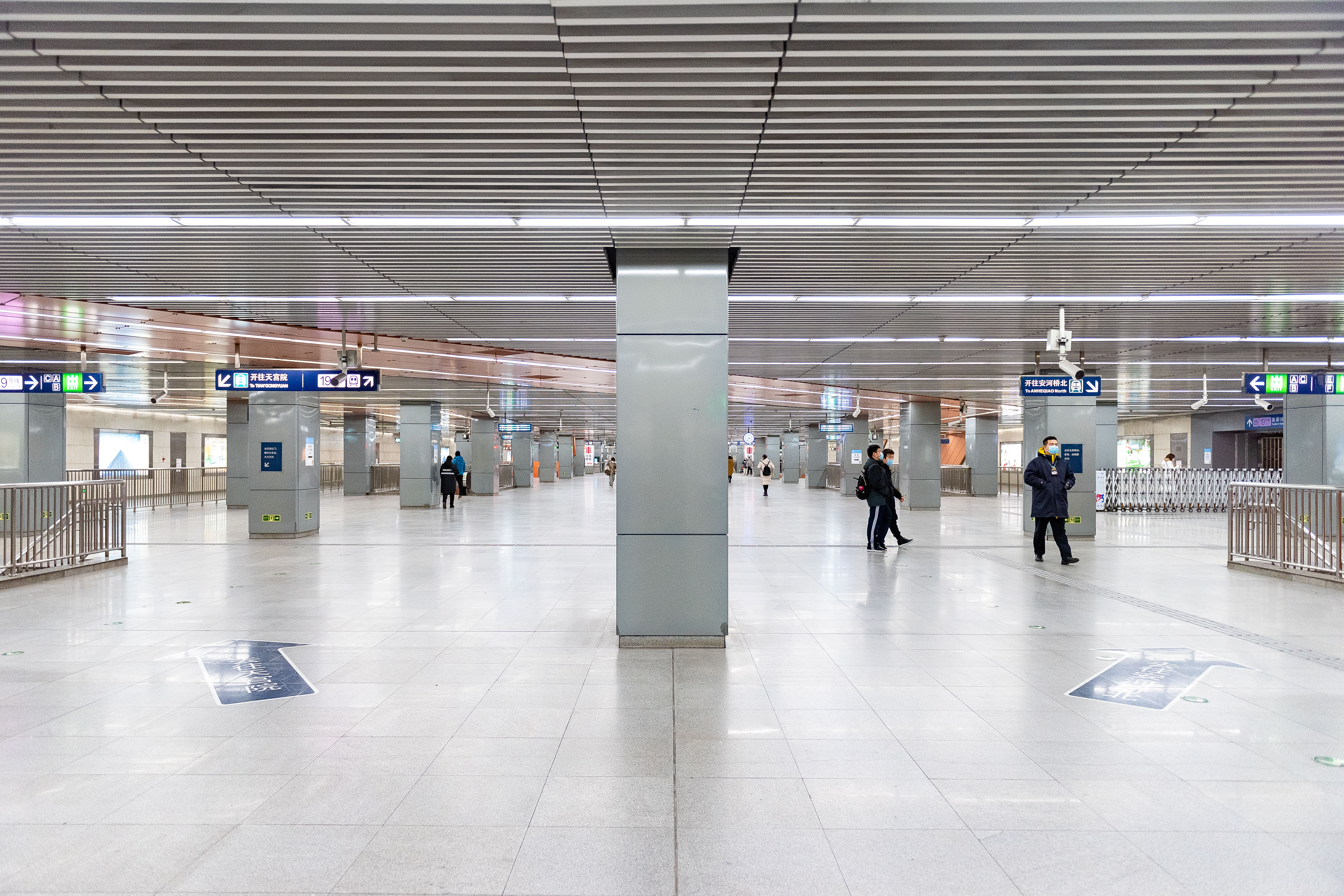
Daxing line concourse

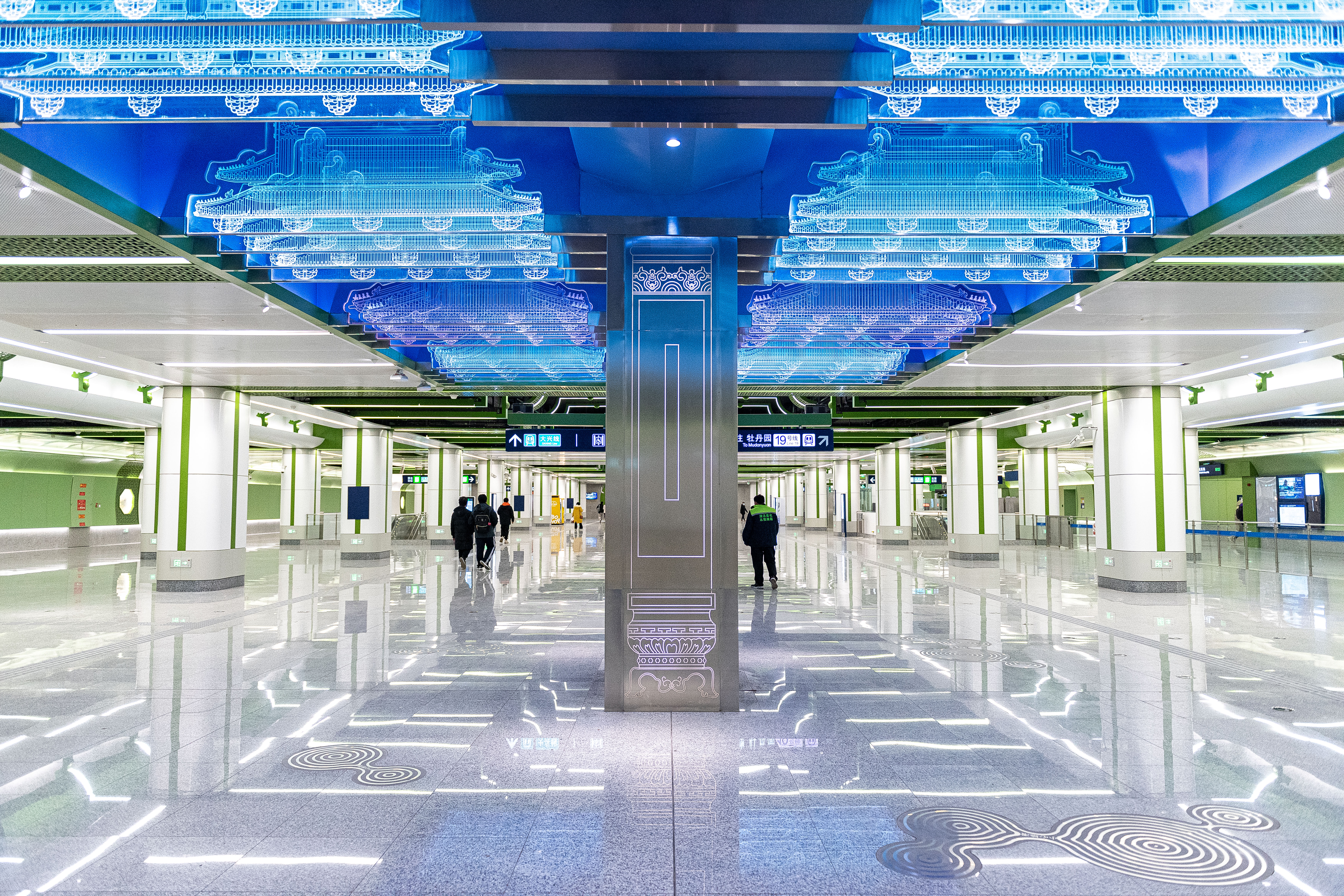
Line 19 concourse
