= Mudanyuan station =

Beijing Subway station

Mudanyuan 牡丹园
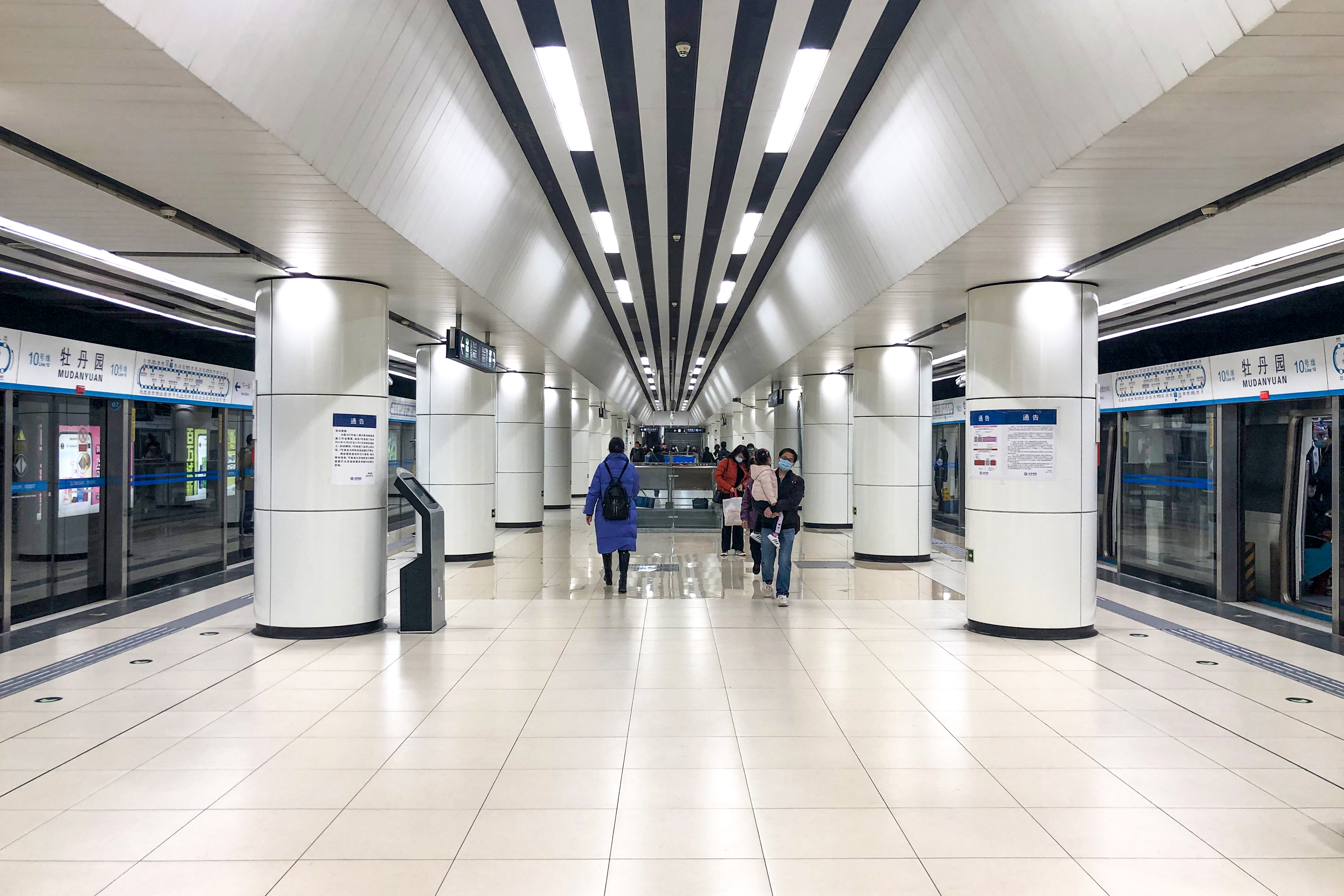
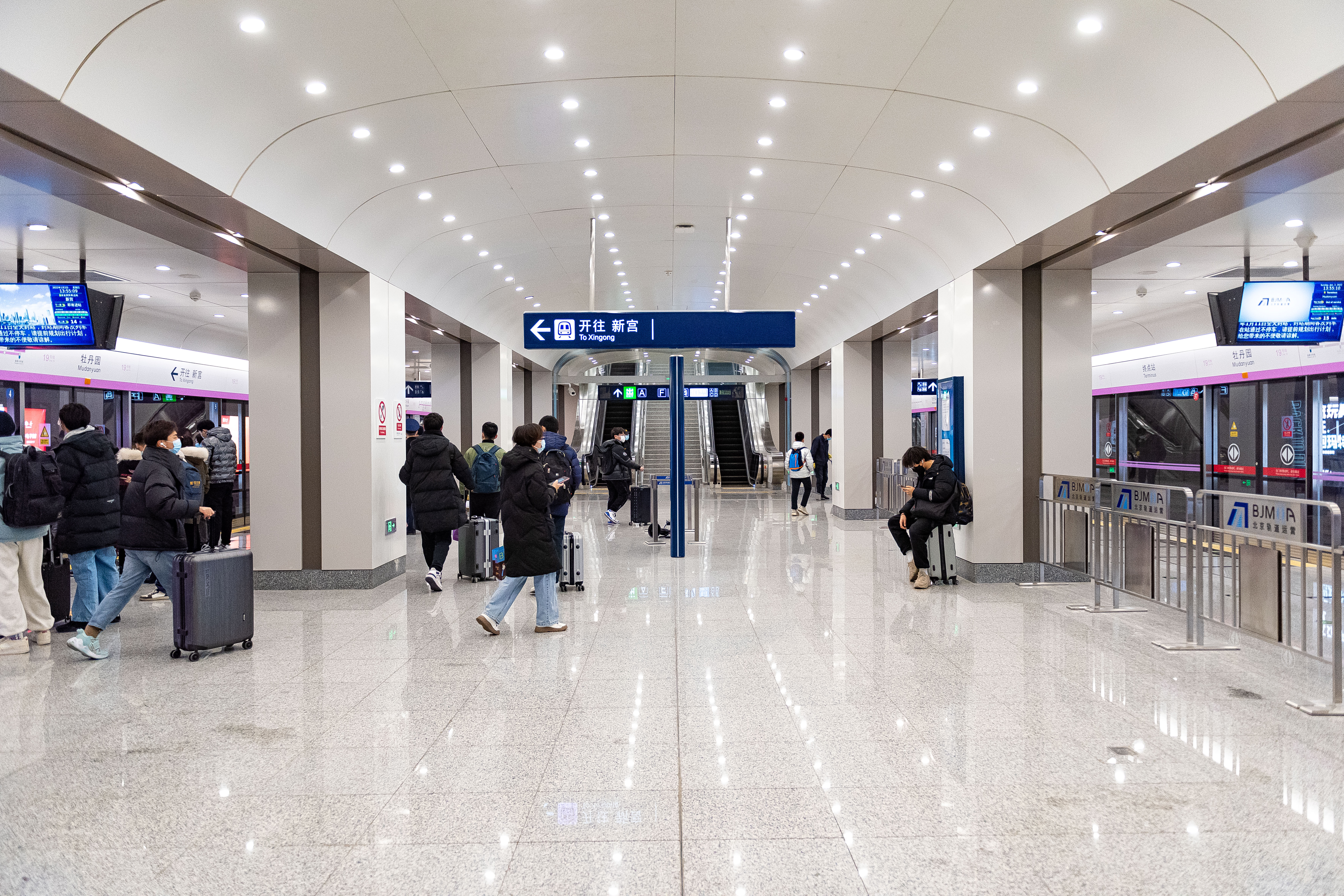
- Line 10 platform after the construction of Line 19 interchange facilities Line 19 platform

General information
- Location: Beitucheng West Road (北土城西路) and Huayuan East Road (花园东路) / Beitaipingzhuang Road (北太平庄路); Huayuanlu Subdistrict, Haidian District, Beijing; China
- Coordinates: 39°58′30″N 116°21′47″E
- Operator: Beijing Mass Transit Railway Operation Corporation Limited (Line 10); Beijing Metro Operation Administration (BJMOA) Corp., Ltd. (Line 19)
- Lines: Line 10; Line 19
- Platforms: 4 (2 island platforms)
- Tracks: 4

Construction
- Structure type: Underground
- Accessible: Yes

History
- Opened: July 19, 2008; 18 years ago (Line 10); December 31, 2021; 4 years ago (Line 19)

Services
Preceding station	Beijing Subway	Following station
Xitucheng outer loop / anticlockwise	Line 10	Jiande Men inner loop / clockwise
Terminus	Line 19	Beitaipingzhuang towards Xingong
Location
- Location within Beijing

Mudanyuan station (simplified Chinese: 牡丹园站; traditional Chinese: 牡丹園站; pinyin: Mǔdānyuán Zhàn; lit. 'Peony Garden station') is a subway station on Line 10 and Line 19 of the Beijing Subway.

== History ==
The station for Line 10 opened on July 19, 2008. It was closed for renovation (in order to interchange with Line 19) on April 10, 2021, and reopened on June 18, 2021. The station for Line 19 opened on December 31, 2021.

== Etymology ==
The name "Mudanyuan" dates back to 1990 when a residential community was built on the east of Beijing Television Factory (currently Beijing Peony Electronic Group). The community was then named after Peony, the brand of their products.

== Platform layout ==
The station has underground island platforms for both line 10 and line 19.

== Exits ==
There are 5 exits, lettered A, B, C, D, and F. Exits A and D are accessible.

== Gallery ==
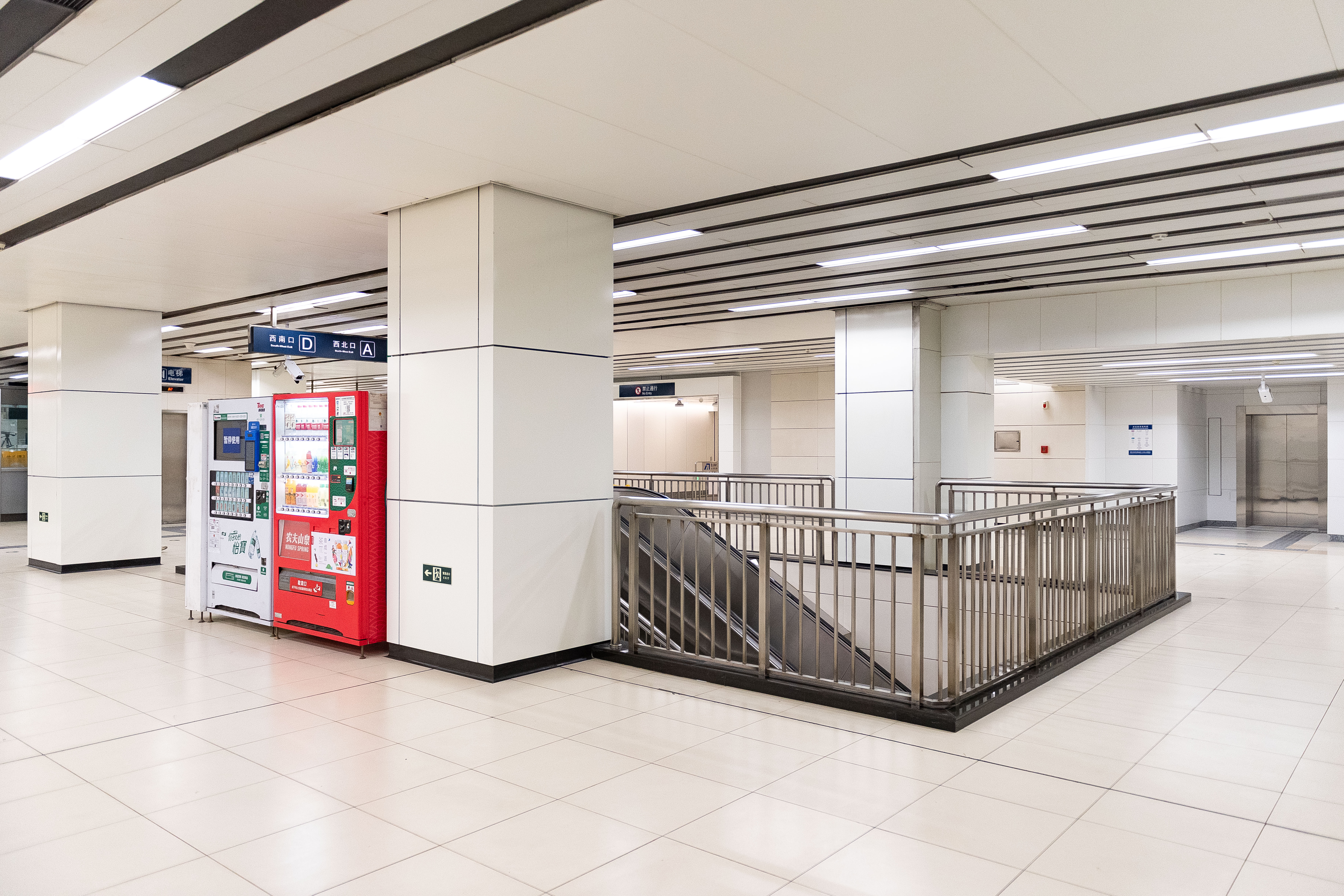
Line 10 west concourse (January 2022)

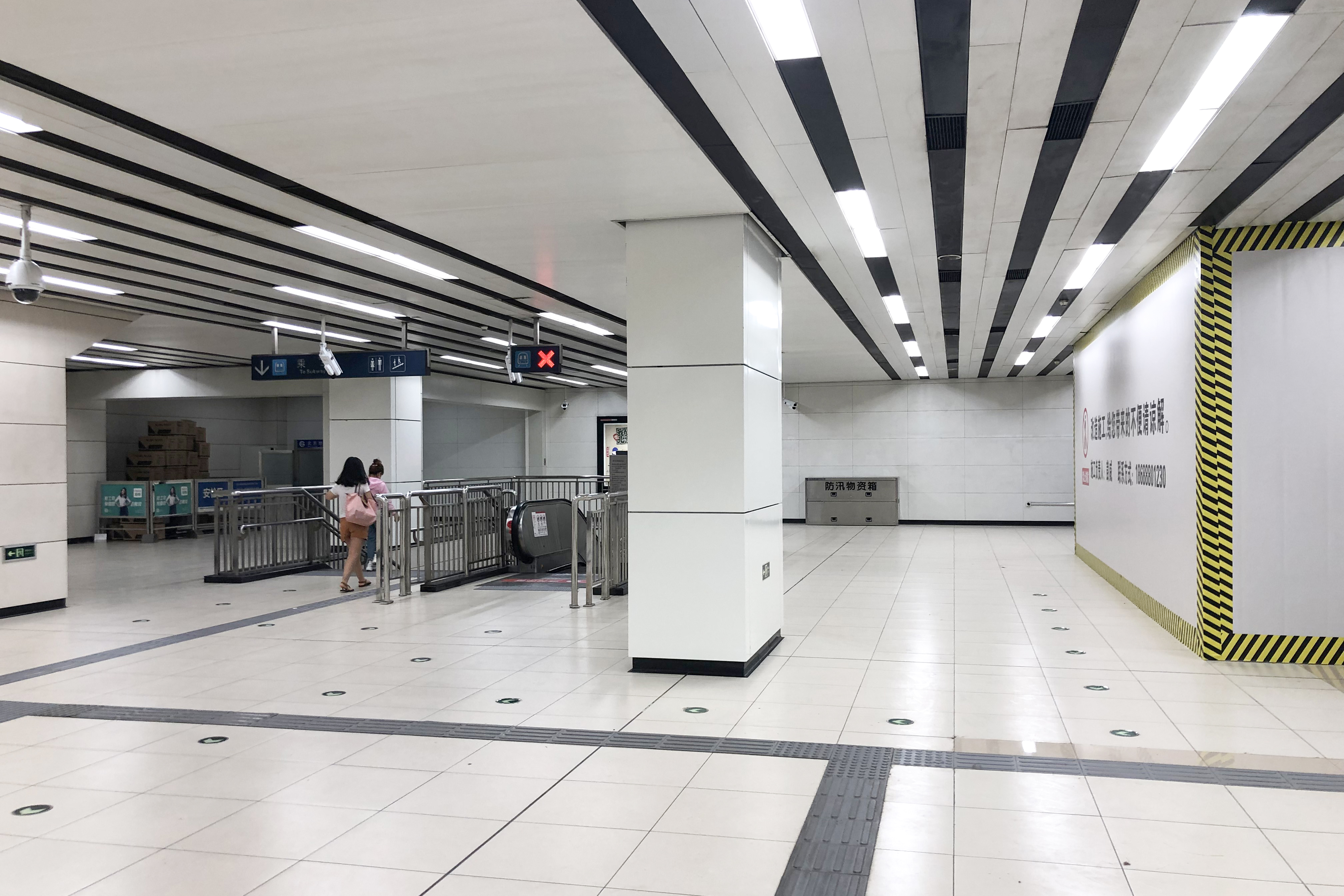
Line 10 east concourse (June 2021)

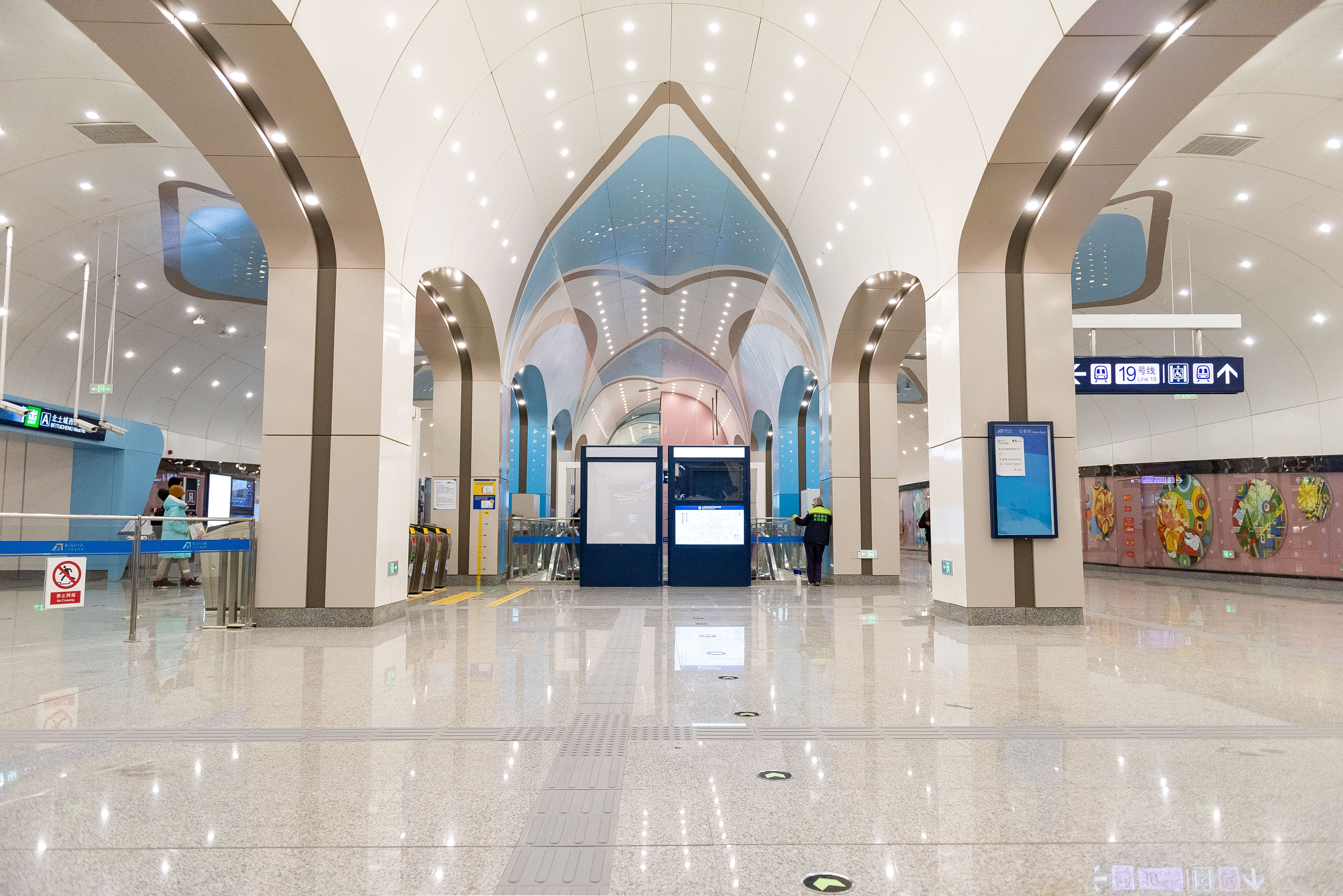
Line 19 concourse
