= Daxing line =

Railway line in Beijing, China

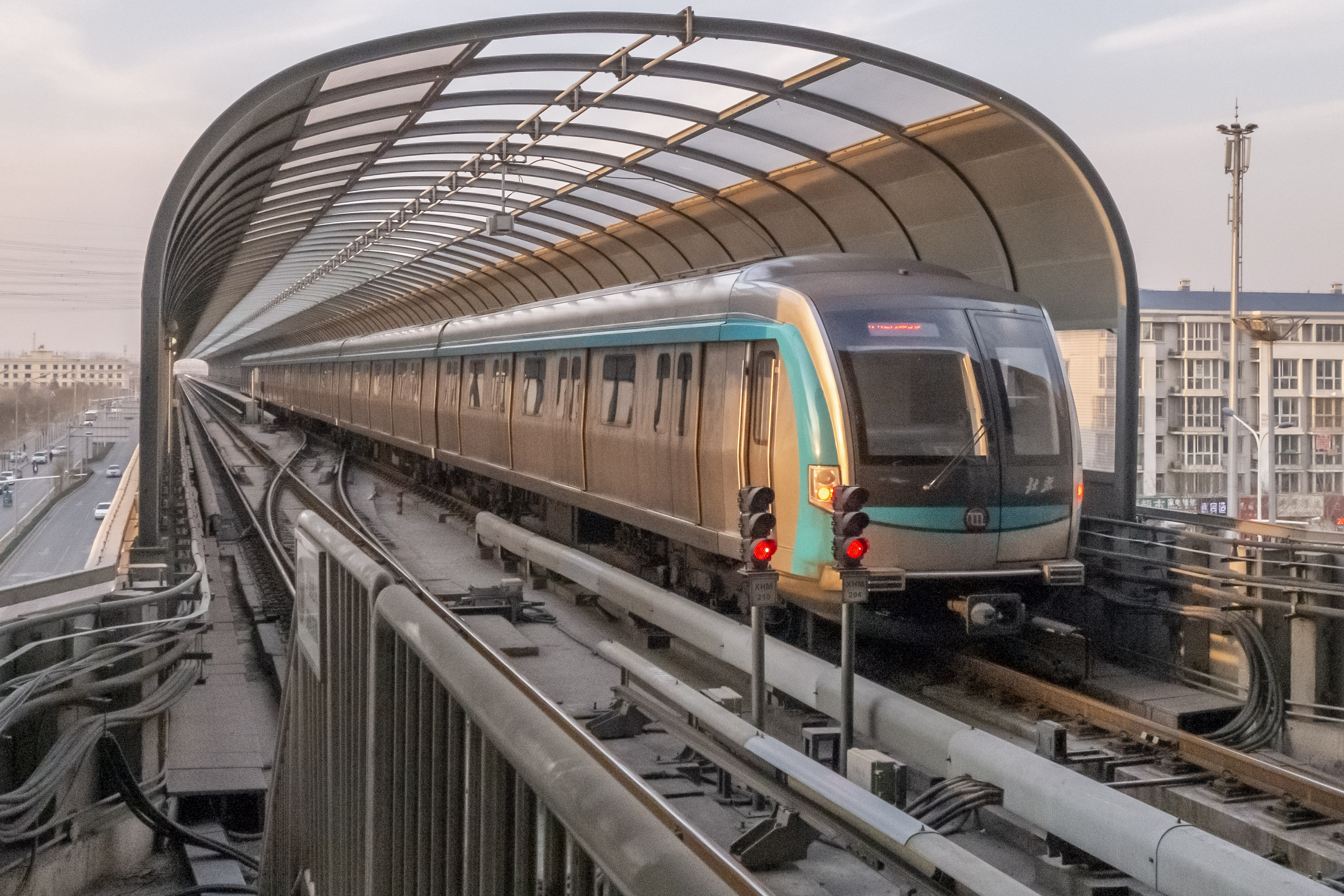
- A Daxing line train leaving Xihongmen station

Overview
- Other name(s): M4 South (planned name); Line 4 South
- Status: Operational
- Locale: Fengtai and Daxing districts Beijing
- Termini: Gongyi Xiqiao; Tiangong Yuan
- Stations: 11

Service
- Type: Rapid transit
- System: Beijing Subway
- Operator: Beijing MTR Corporation Limited
- Depot: Nanzhaolu
- Rolling stock: 6-car Type B (SFM05)
- Daily ridership: 310,000 (2014 Avg. Daxing Line only); 376,000 (2014 Peak Daxing Line only)^{[a]}

History
- Opened: 30 December 2010; 15 years ago

Technical
- Line length: 21.76 km (13.52 mi)
- Character: Underground and elevated
- Track gauge: 1,435 mm (4 ft 8 1/2 in) standard gauge
- Operating speed: 100 km/h (62 mph) (maximum service speed)

The Daxing Line of the Beijing Subway (simplified Chinese: 北京地铁大兴线; traditional Chinese: 北京地鐵大興線; pinyin: Běijīng Dìtiě Dàxīng Xiàn) is a rapid transit line that connects the southern Daxing District of the city with the subway network. It extends Line 4 south from its southern terminus at Gongyixiqiao, on the 4th Ring Road in Fengtai District, to Tian'gongyuan, beyond the 6th Ring Road in Daxing District. The Daxing Line is about 21.76 km (13.52 mi) in length with 18 km (11 mi) underground. Daxing line contains 12 stations and is about 21.76 km (13.52 mi). Initially, the Daxing line was planned to have 4 ground stations. However, due to lack of space, only Xihongmen was built above the surface. Full-scale construction began in 2007 and the line was opened on 30 December 2010, 14:00 local time. Daxing line's color is teal, the same as Line 4.

== Route and service ==
Route of Daxing Line

Though the Daxing Line is classified as a distinct line, the Beijing MTR Corporation Limited operates through-train service on Lines 4 and Daxing, making the two lines effectively one line for travelers.^{[b]} With the opening of the Daxing Line on 30 December 2010, the Beijing MTR Corporation Limited now runs two types of train service on the combined Line 4-Daxing Line route:

- A full-route service that covers the entire Line 4 and Daxing Lines. This train service runs from Anheqiao North, the northern terminus of Line 4, to Tian'gongyuan, the southern terminus of the Daxing Line.
- A partial-route service that covers the entire Line 4 route plus one stop on the Daxing Line. This service runs from Anheqiao North to Xin'gong, the northernmost stop on the Daxing Line. Travelers wishing to proceed further south on the Daxing Line would have to switch to a south-bound full-route train.

=== Service routes ===
- Anheqiaobei — Xingong (through service via Line 4)
- Anheqiaobei — Tiangong Yuan (through service via Line 4)
- Rush hour (7:00-8:00): Zhongguancun — Huangcun Xidajie (through service via Line 4)

=== Stations ===
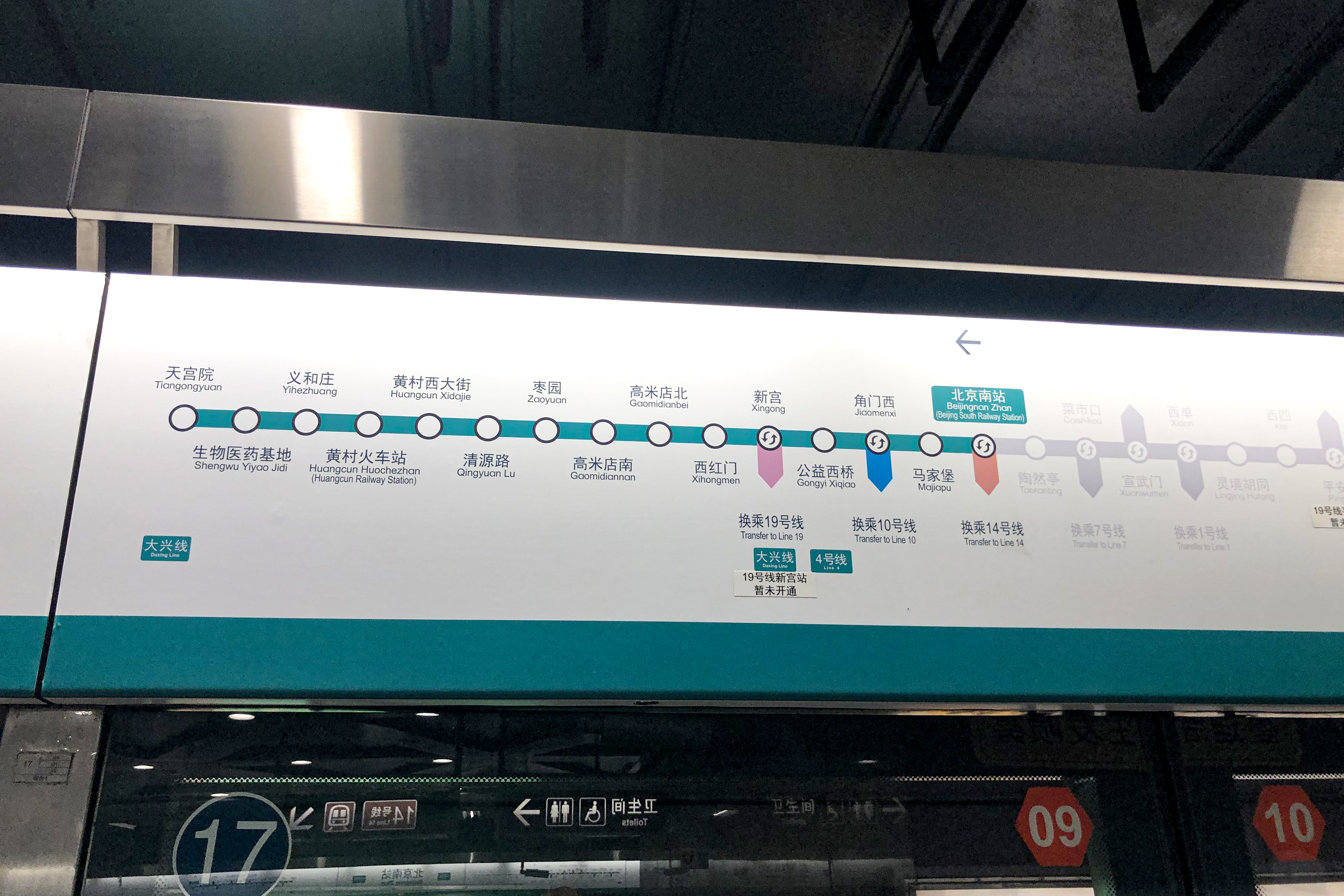
Diagram showing distinct line labels for the Daxing Line and Line 4 with through service.

Line 4 and Daxing line stations, from north to south:

Line Name	Service routes			Station Name		Connections	Nearby Bus Stops	Distance km		Location
Line Name	Service routes			English	Chinese	Connections	Nearby Bus Stops	Distance km		Location
Line 4	●	●		Anheqiaobei	安河桥北		305 437 575 608	0.000	0.000	Haidian
Line 4	●	●		Beigongmen	北宫门		303 332 346 384 394 563 584 601 观光3 夜8	1.363	1.363	Haidian
Line 4	●	●		Xi Yuan	西苑	16	129 303 331 332 333 346 384 393 394 432 437 438 476 508 534 563 579 584 601 610 636 644 671 686 688 夜8	1.251	2.614	Haidian
Line 4	●	●		Yuanmingyuan Park	圆明园		129 331 424 432 438 508 579 601 观光3	1.672	4.286	Haidian
Line 4	●	●		Peking Univ East Gate	北京大学东门		129 305 307 320 331 355 365 375 438 450 549 579 601 614 681 982 观光3	1.295	5.581	Haidian
Line 4	●	●	●	Zhongguancun	中关村		26 302 305 307 320 332 355 365 384 392 400 400快 450 466 549 579 584 601 613 614 681 686 982 快速直达专线26 快速直达专线37 快速直达专线126 快速直达专线127 快速直达专线139 快速直达专线147 快速直达专线177 快速直达专线204 夜8	0.887	6.468	Haidian
Line 4	●	●	●	Haidian Huangzhuang	海淀黄庄	10	302 305 307 320 332 355 365 386 528 584 614 630 634 653 671 681 快速直达专线26 快速直达专线37 快速直达专线126 快速直达专线127 快速直达专线139 快速直达专线147 通医专线6 夜8	0.900	7.368	Haidian
Line 4	●	●	●	Renmin Daxue (Renmin Univ.)	人民大学	12	26 300 300快 302 305 320 323 332 355 361 365 368 425 549 584 614 651 653 658 695 921 快速直达专线19 快速直达专线139 夜8 夜30	1.063	8.431	Haidian
Line 4	●	●	●	Weigongcun	魏公村		26 56 305 320 332 603 609 645 651 653 658 695 夜8	1.051	9.482	Haidian
Line 4	●	●	●	Guojia Tushuguan (National Library)	国家图书馆	9 16	56 86 92 129 305 320 332 481 609 653 658 695 夜8	1.658	11.140	Haidian
Line 4	●	●	●	Dongwuyuan (Beijing Zoo)	动物园		7 15 16 19 27 56 87 102 103 105 107 111 129 305 332 334 347 360 360快 362 534 604 632 695 夜8	1.517	12.657	Xicheng
Line 4	●	●	●	Xizhimen	西直门	2 13; Huairou–Miyun VAP	7 16 21 26 27 44 69 80 87 105 111 200 305 332 347 362 375 387 534 604 618 632 651 686 693 夜8 夜20 专216	1.441	14.098	Xicheng
Line 4	●	●	●	Xinjie Kou	新街口		7 47 105 111 508 夜36	1.025	15.123	Xicheng
Line 4	●	●	●	Ping'anli	平安里	6 19	4 7 13 22 38 47 88 105 107 111 118 143 409 夜3 夜4 夜36	1.100	16.223	Xicheng
Line 4	●	●	●	Xisi	西四		3 13 22 38 88 101 102 103 105 109 124 143 409 612 夜4 夜13	1.100	17.323	Xicheng
Line 4	●	●	●	Lingjing Hutong	灵境胡同		22 38 46 68 88 102 105 109 143 夜4	0.869	18.192	Xicheng
Line 4	●	●	●	Xidan	西单	1	1 1区 7 15 22 52 83 88 102 105 109 143 夜1 夜4	1.011	19.203	Xicheng
Line 4	●	●	●	Xuanwu Men	宣武门	2	7 9 15 22 44 67 83 102 105 109 137 142 143 144 332 夜4 夜5	0.815	20.018	Xicheng
Line 4	●	●	●	Caishi Kou	菜市口	7	5 6 48 57 83 102 105 109 144 381 夜4 夜7 专13	1.152	21.170	Xicheng
Line 4	●	●	●	Taoranting	陶然亭		40 59 83 133 381 144 414 夜4 夜23 专13 专155	1.200	22.370	Xicheng
Line 4	●	●	●	Beijing South railway station	北京南站	14; VNP Jingjin	106 133 200 343 381 414 458 485 529 665 夜24 专18 专155	1.643	24.013	Fengtai
Line 4	●	●	●	Majiapu	马家堡		51 66 72 106 134 144 485 501 529 954 专145	1.480	25.493	Fengtai
Line 4	●	●	●	Jiaomenxi	角门西	10	30 51 72 144 474 501 529 646 954 专145 专209	0.827	26.320	Fengtai
Line 4	●	●	●	Gongyi Xiqiao	公益西桥		377 400 474 511 556 602 646 685 825 954 990 专145 专209	0.989	27.309	Fengtai
Daxing line	●	●	●	Xingong	新宫	19	343 353 354 369 400 474 556 827 829 946 954 快速直达专线22 专59 专67 专190 专199	2.798	30.107	
Daxing line		●	●	Xihong Men	西红门		381 454 470 474 483 646 829 937 993 快速直达专线131 兴13 兴14 兴42 兴66 兴68 兴71 兴79 兴91 专84 专97 专169	5.102	35.209	Daxing
Daxing line		●	●	Gaomidianbei	高米店北		629 937 快速直达专线131 兴12 兴34 兴42 兴66 兴82	1.810	37.019	Daxing
Daxing line		●	●	Gaomidiannan	高米店南		913 937 快速直达专线131 快速直达专线175 通医专线10 兴11 兴53 兴66 专24	1.128	38.147	Daxing
Daxing line		●	●	Zaoyuan	枣园		410 631快 829 937 954 968 快速直达专线175 通医专线10 兴47 兴66 X101 X102 X104 X105 兴940	1.096	39.243	Daxing
Daxing line		●	●	Qingyuan Lu	清源路		456 629 631快 829 913 934 954 968 969 快速直达专线175 快速直达专线188 通医专线10 兴23 兴24 兴26 兴27 兴28 兴30 兴33 兴35 兴37 兴48 兴53 兴54 兴66 X101 X105 X107 兴940	1.200	40.443	Daxing
Daxing line		●	●	Huangcun Xidajie	黄村西大街		456 629 631快 829 840 913 934 968 快速直达专线175 快速直达专线188 通医专线10 兴11 兴14 兴14区 兴17 兴19 兴20 兴22 兴28 兴29 兴29区 兴31 兴31区 兴35 兴37 兴45 兴46 兴48 兴52 兴54 兴55 兴57 兴59 兴61 兴66 X105 X107 兴940	1.214	41.657	Daxing
Daxing line		●		Huangcun railway station	黄村火车站	HCP IPP	366 369 629 631快 829 913 957 968 969 快速直达专线136 快速直达专线175 快速直达专线188 兴12 兴13 兴15 兴16 兴18 兴20 兴21 兴22 兴25 兴29 兴29区 兴37 兴45 兴46 兴55 兴66 X107	0.987	42.644	Daxing
Daxing line		●		Yihezhuang	义和庄		456 934 快速直达专线175 通医专线10 兴13 兴15 兴16 兴25 兴37 兴44 兴45 兴46 兴48 兴55 兴65 兴66 兴77 兴81 兴82	2.035	44.679	Daxing
Daxing line		●		Biomedical Base	生物医药基地		456 827 快速直达专线175 通医专线10 兴15 兴16 兴21 兴23 兴27 兴28 兴30 兴39 兴40 兴40区 兴41 兴44 兴46 兴48 兴52 兴53 兴54 兴55 兴55区 兴61 兴61区 兴64 兴65 兴66 兴68 兴77 兴80 兴81 兴82 X102	2.918	47.597	Daxing
Daxing line		●		Tiangong Yuan	天宫院		456 827 829 940 快速直达专线15 快速直达专线175 通医专线10 兴11 兴21 兴23 兴27 兴28 兴30 兴39 兴40 兴40区 兴41 兴44 兴46 兴48 兴53 兴54 兴55 兴55区 兴61 兴61区 兴64 兴65 兴66 兴68 兴77 兴80 兴81 X102 X108	1.811	49.408	Daxing

== History ==
- 1 June 2008: Construction began on Daxing Line. Completion set for the end of 2011.
- 16 November 2008: Completion date moved up to 28 December 2010.
- 20 April 2010: Completion date moved again to 28 October 2010.
- 30 December 2010: Daxing Line opened.

Segment	Commencement	Length	Station(s)	Name
Gongyi Xiqiao — Tiangongyuan	30 December 2010	21.76 km (13.52 mi)	11	(initial phase)
Anheqiaobei — Gongyi Xiqiao	28 September 2009	see Line 4		(through services)

== Rolling Stock ==
Model	Image	Manufacturer	Year built	Amount in service	Fleet numbers	Depot
SFM05		CRRC Qingdao Sifang	2008, 2010	73	001–040; 061–093	Longbeicun; Majiapu; Nanzhaolu

== Notes ==
a. Line 4 ridership included.
b. See 北京京港地铁有限公司 (in Simplified Chinese). Beijing MTR Corporation Limited. 29 December 2010. Archived from the original on 1 January 2011. & "Beijing MTR Corporation Limited". Mtr.bj.cn. 27 September 2010. Archived from the original on 9 October 2011. (English)
