= Gongyi Xiqiao station =

Beijing Subway station

Coordinates: 39°50′09″N 116°22′15″E

Gongyi Xiqiao 公益西桥
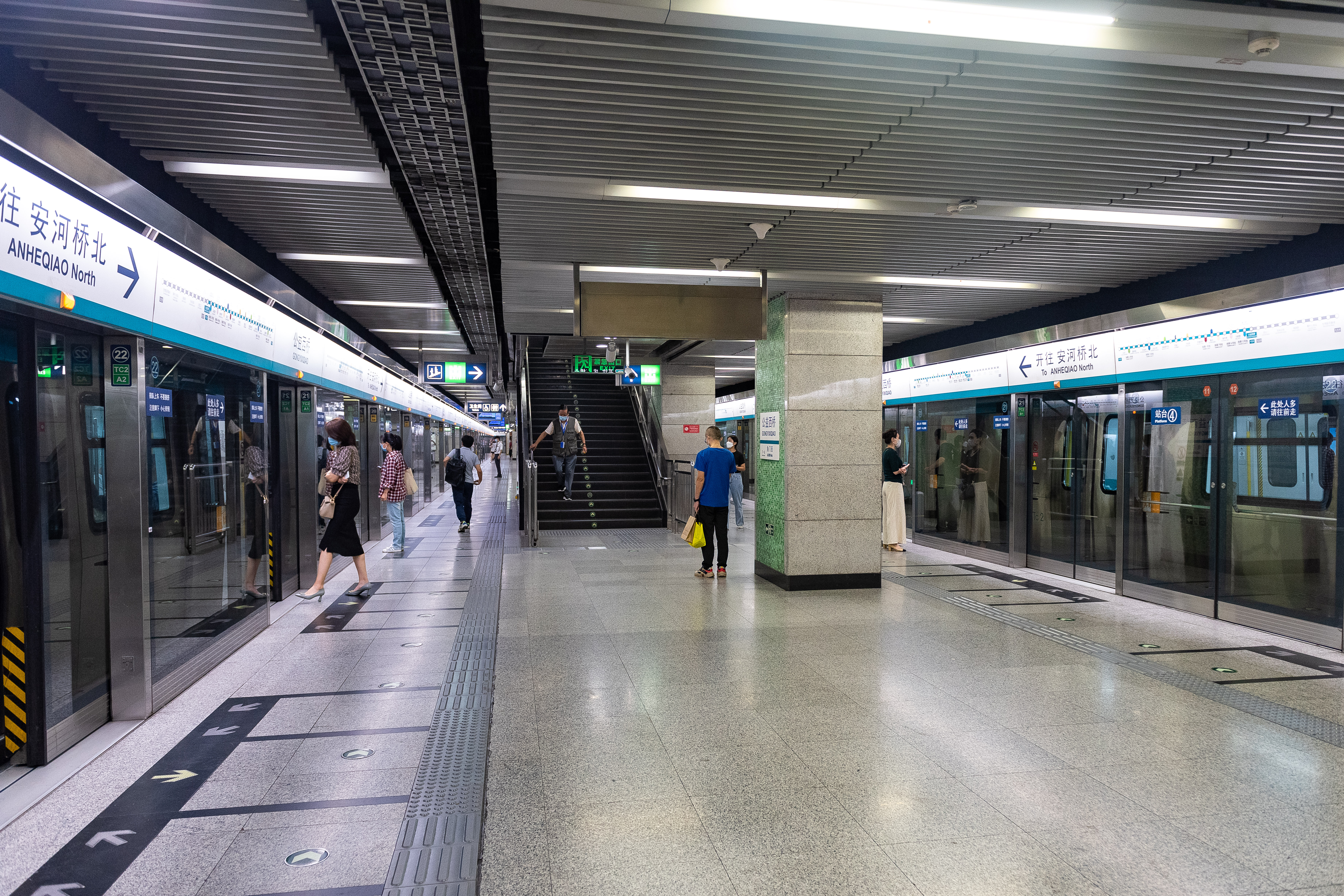
- Northbound platform

General information
- Location: Majiapu West Road and Jiayuan North Road (嘉园北路); Fengtai District, Beijing; China
- Operator: Beijing MTR Corporation Limited
- Line: Line 4
- Platforms: 4 (2 island platforms)
- Tracks: 4

Construction
- Structure type: Underground
- Accessible: Yes

History
- Opened: September 28, 2009; 16 years ago

Services
Preceding station	Beijing Subway	Following station
Jiaomenxi towards Anheqiaobei	Line 4	Xingong (Daxing Line) towards Tiangong Yuan
Location
- Location within Beijing

Gongyi Xiqiao station (simplified Chinese: 公益西桥站; traditional Chinese: 公益西橋站; pinyin: Gōngyì Xīqiáo Zhàn) is a station on Line 4 of the Beijing Subway.

== Station layout ==
The station has underground dual-island platforms.

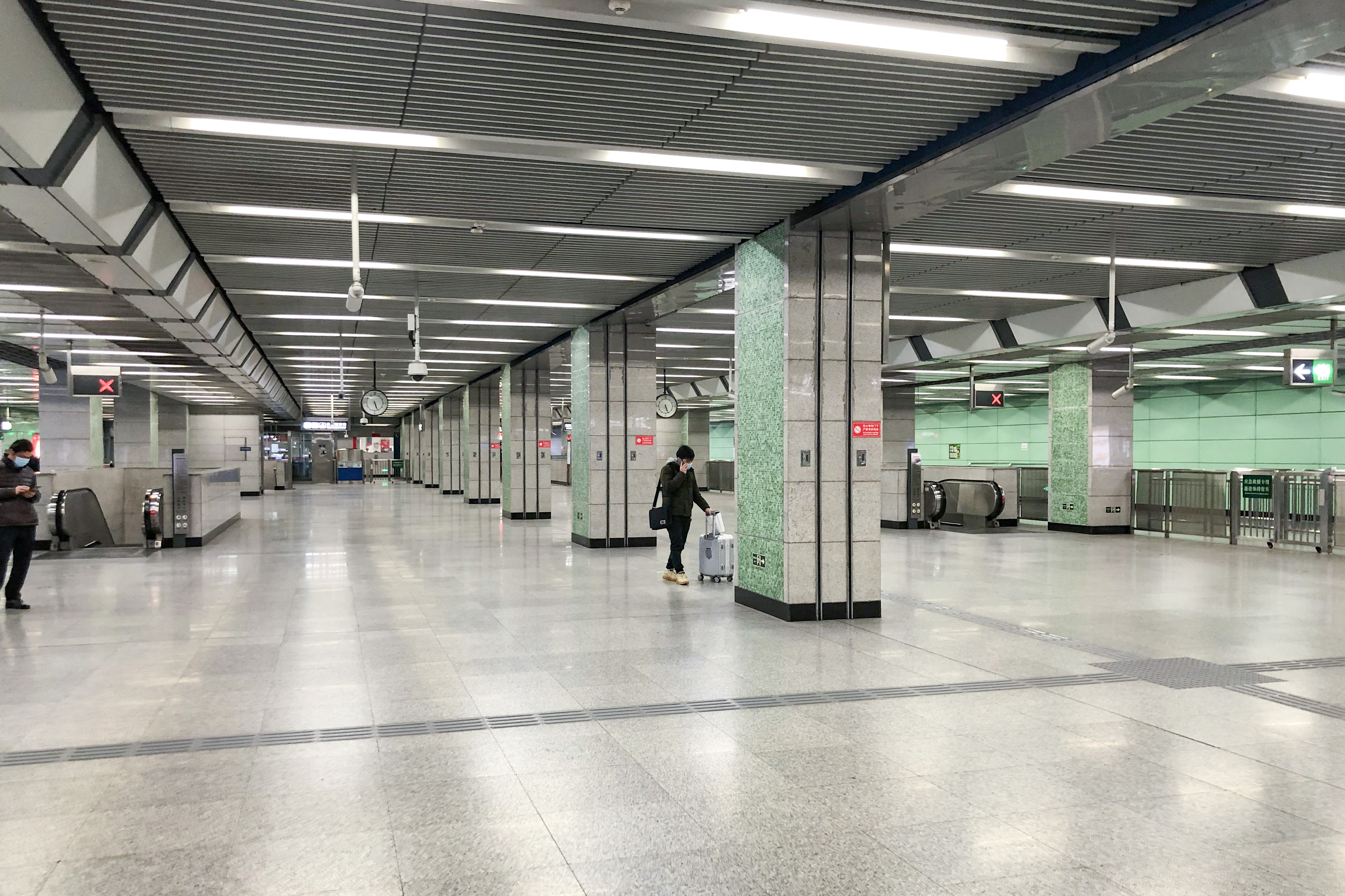
Concourse

== Exits ==
There are 4 exits in operation, lettered A, B, C, and D. Other exits are closed. Exit B is accessible.
