= Xihongmen station =

Beijing Subway station

Xihong Men 西红门
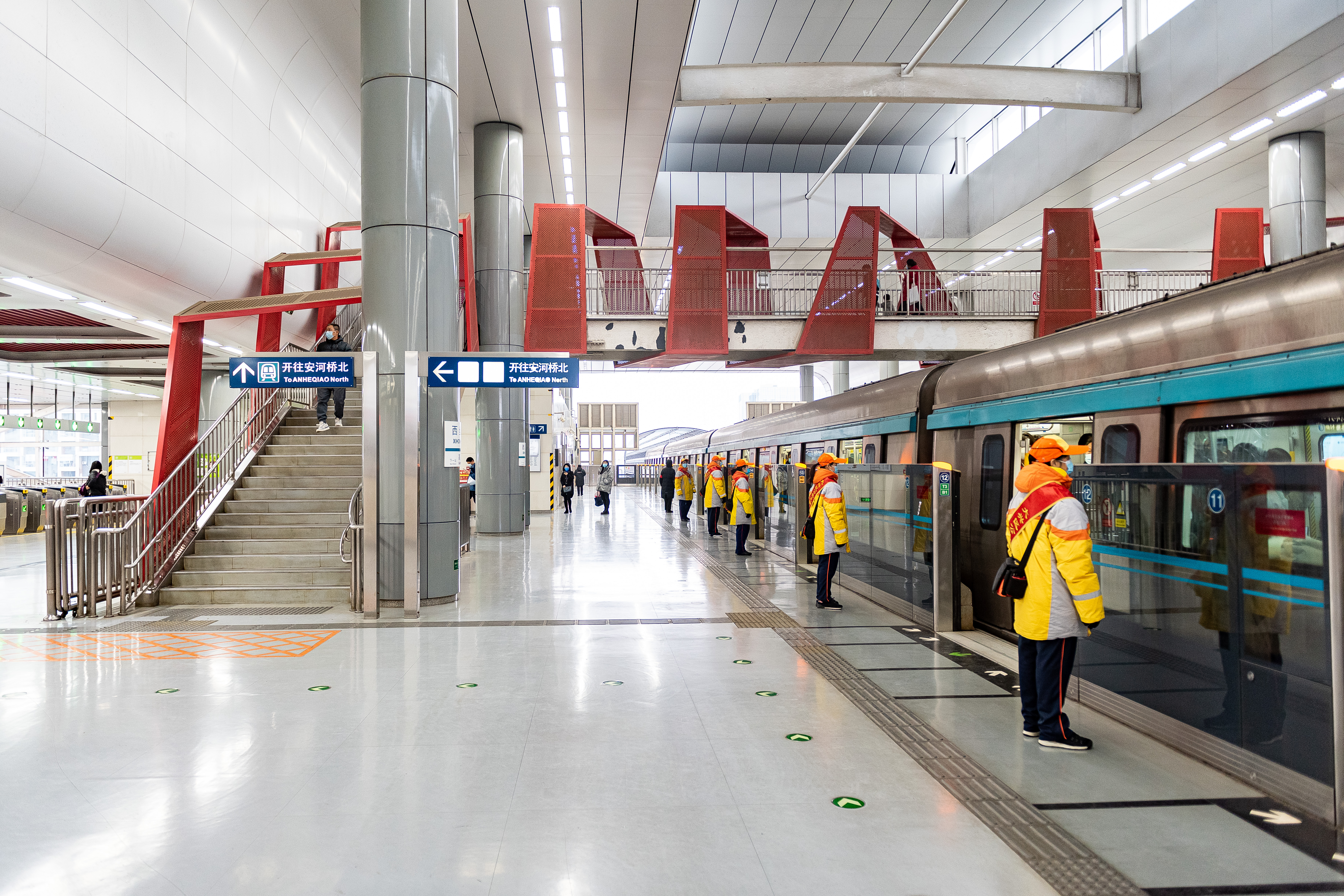
- Southbound platform

General information
- Location: Xinning Street (欣宁街) south of West Hongfu Road (宏福西路); Xihongmen, Daxing District, Beijing; China
- Coordinates: 39°47′23″N 116°19′43″E
- Operator: Beijing MTR Corporation Limited
- Line: Daxing line
- Platforms: 2 (2 side platforms)
- Tracks: 2

Construction
- Structure type: Elevated
- Accessible: Yes

History
- Opened: December 30, 2010; 15 years ago

Services
Preceding station	Beijing Subway	Following station
Xingong towards Anheqiaobei	Daxing line	Gaomidianbei towards Tiangongyuan
Location
- Location within Beijing

Xihong Men Station (simplified Chinese: 西红门站; traditional Chinese: 西紅門站; pinyin: Xīhóng Mén Zhàn) is a station on the Daxing line of the Beijing Subway. Due to lack of space, the station is the only station on the Daxing Line to be an elevated station.

== Station layout ==
The station has 2 elevated side platforms.

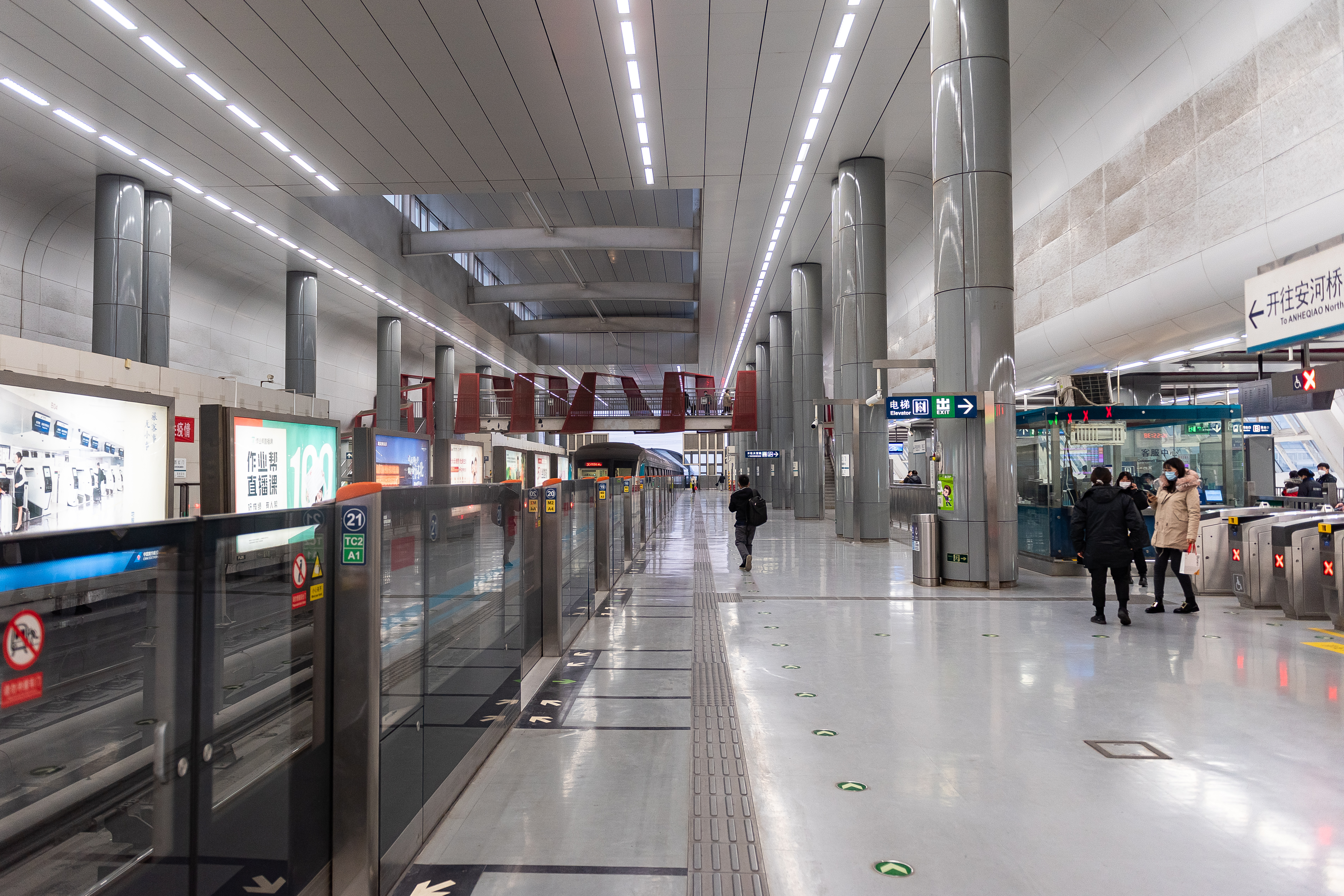
Northbound platform

== Exits ==
There are 3 exits, lettered A, B1, and B2. Exits A and B2 are accessible.
