= Yihezhuang station =

Beijing Subway station

Yihezhuang 义和庄
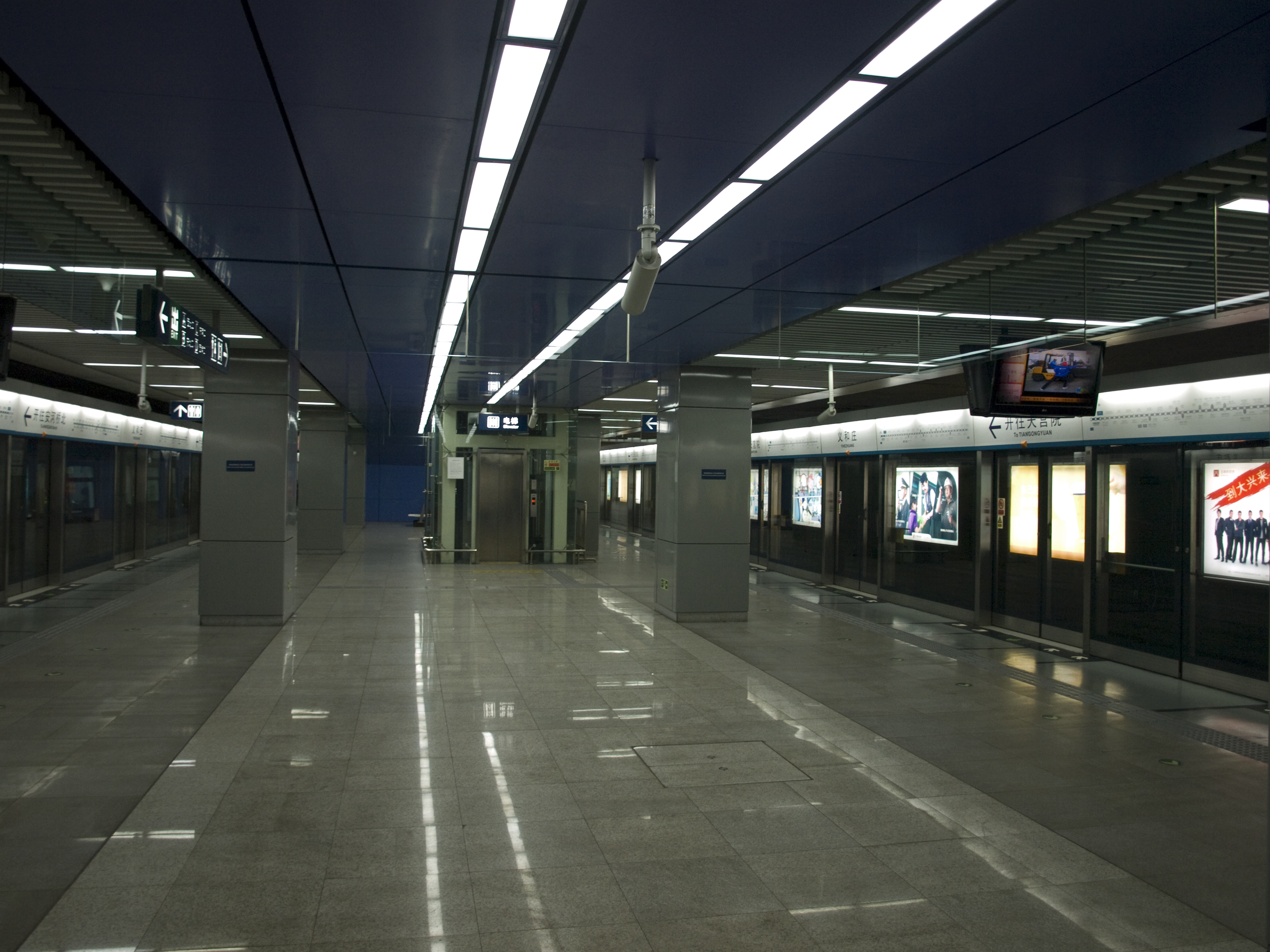

General information
- Location: Xinyuan Street (新源大街) and Xinghua Street (兴华大街); Daxing District, Beijing; China
- Coordinates: 39°42′45″N 116°19′09″E
- Operator: Beijing MTR Corporation Limited
- Line: Daxing line
- Platforms: 2 (1 island platform)
- Tracks: 2

Construction
- Structure type: Underground
- Accessible: Yes

History
- Opened: December 30, 2010; 15 years ago

Services
Preceding station	Beijing Subway	Following station
Huangcun railway station towards Anheqiaobei	Daxing line	Biomedical Base towards Tiangongyuan
Location
- Location within Beijing

Yihezhuang Station (simplified Chinese: 义和庄站; traditional Chinese: 義和莊站; pinyin: Yìhézhuāng Zhàn) is a station on the Daxing line of the Beijing Subway.

== Station layout ==
The station has an underground island platform.

== Exits ==
There are four exits, lettered A, B, C, and D. Exit B is accessible.
