= Zhongguancun station =

Beijing Subway station

Coordinates: 39°59′02″N 116°18′59″E

Zhongguancun 中关村
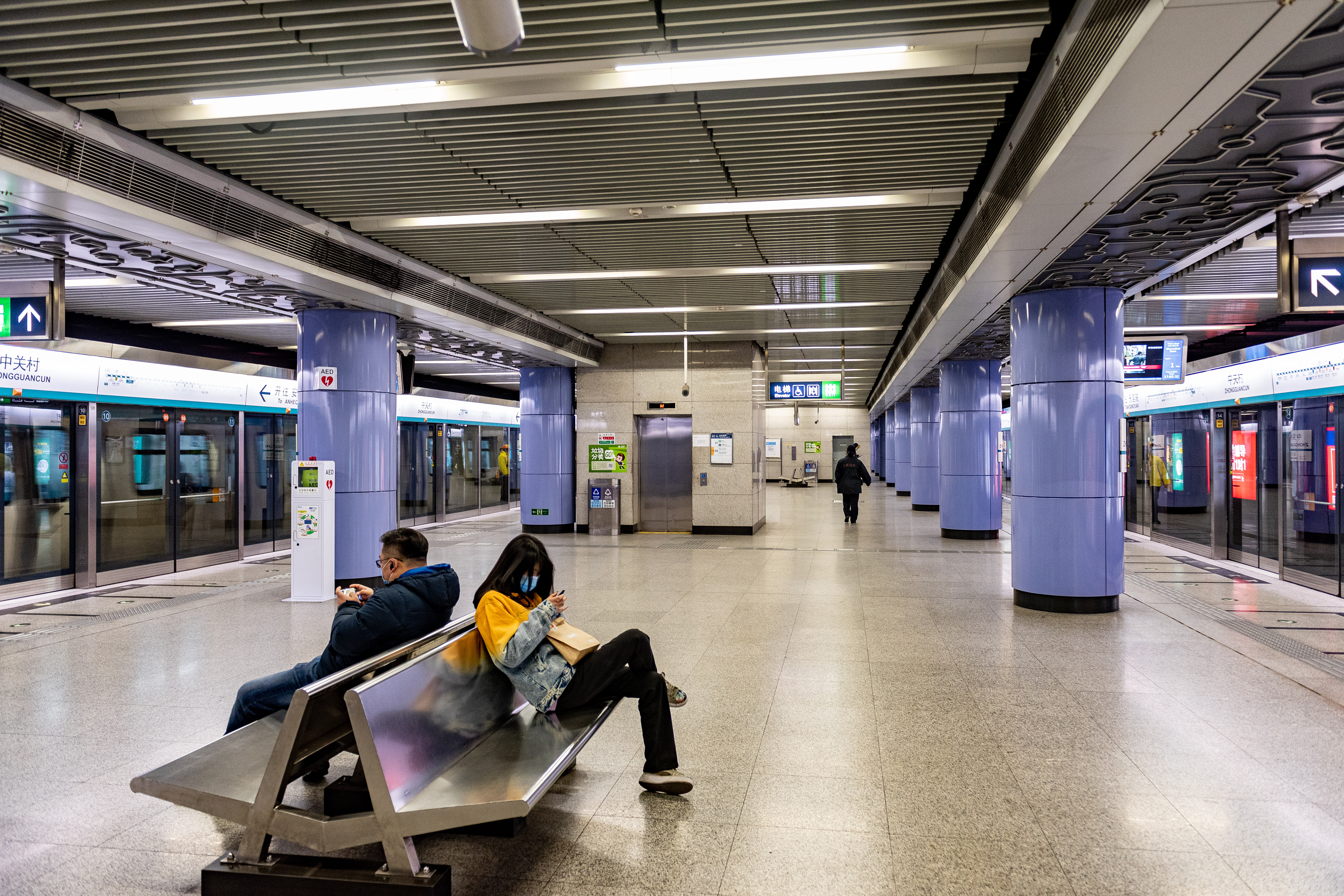
- Platform

General information
- Location: Zhongguancun Street; Zhongguancun, Haidian District, Beijing; China
- Operator: Beijing MTR Corporation Limited
- Line: Line 4
- Platforms: 2 (1 island platform)
- Tracks: 2

Construction
- Structure type: Underground
- Accessible: Yes

History
- Opened: September 28, 2009

Services
Preceding station	Beijing Subway	Following station
Peking Univ. East Gate towards Anheqiaobei	Line 4	Haidian Huangzhuang towards Tiangong Yuan
Location
- Location within Beijing

Zhongguancun Station (simplified Chinese: 中关村站; traditional Chinese: 中關村站; pinyin: Zhōngguāncūn Zhàn) is a station on Line 4 of the Beijing Subway, located in the Zhongguancun area of the Haidian District.

== Station layout ==
The station has an underground island platform.

== Exits ==
There are 7 exits, lettered A1, A2, B, C1, C3, D, and E. Exit A1 is accessible.
