= Huangcun railway station =

Railway and subway station in Beijing

Huangcun Railway Station 黄村火车站
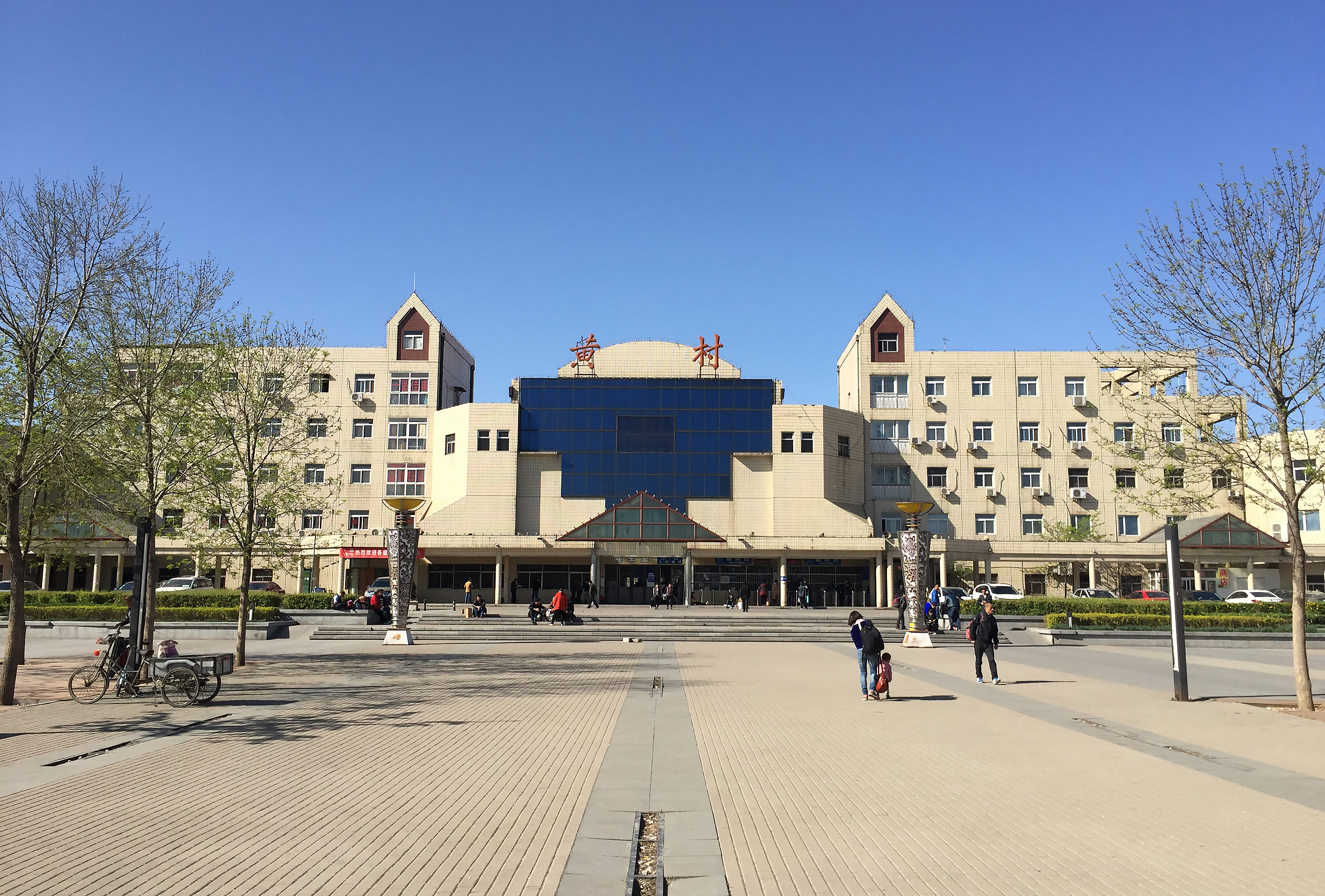

General information
- Location: Linxiaolu Subdistrict, Daxing District, Beijing; China
- Coordinates: 39°43′13″N 116°19′54″E
- Operator: China Railway Beijing Group, Beijing MTR Corporation Limited
- Lines: Beijing–Shanghai Railway; Beijing–Kowloon Railway; Daxing line
- Platforms: Subway: 2 (1 island platform)
- Tracks: Subway: 2

Construction
- Structure type: At-grade (railway station); Underground (subway station)
- Accessible: Yes

History
- Opened: 1895; 131 years ago (railway station); December 30, 2010; 15 years ago (subway station)
- Closed: June 20, 2022; 4 years ago (railway station, now freight only)

Services
| Preceding station | Beijing Subway | Following station |
|---|---|---|
| Huangcun Xidajie towards Anheqiaobei | Daxing line | Yihezhuang towards Tiangongyuan |

Former services
| Preceding station | China Railway | Following station |
|---|---|---|
| Beijing Fengtai towards Beijing | Beijing–Shanghai railway | Guangyang towards Shanghai |
| Liying towards Beijing West | Beijing–Kowloon railway | Xizaolin towards Hung Hom |
Location
- Location within Beijing

Huangcun railway station (黄村火车站) is a station on Beijing–Shanghai Railway and Beijing–Kowloon Railway in Daxing District, Beijing.

== History ==
The railway station officially closed for all passenger and ticket services on 20 June 2022. It is a freight-only railway station as of December 2023.

== Beijing Subway ==
Huangcun railway station is served by a subway station of the same name on the Daxing line of the Beijing Subway. The subway station was opened on December 30, 2010.

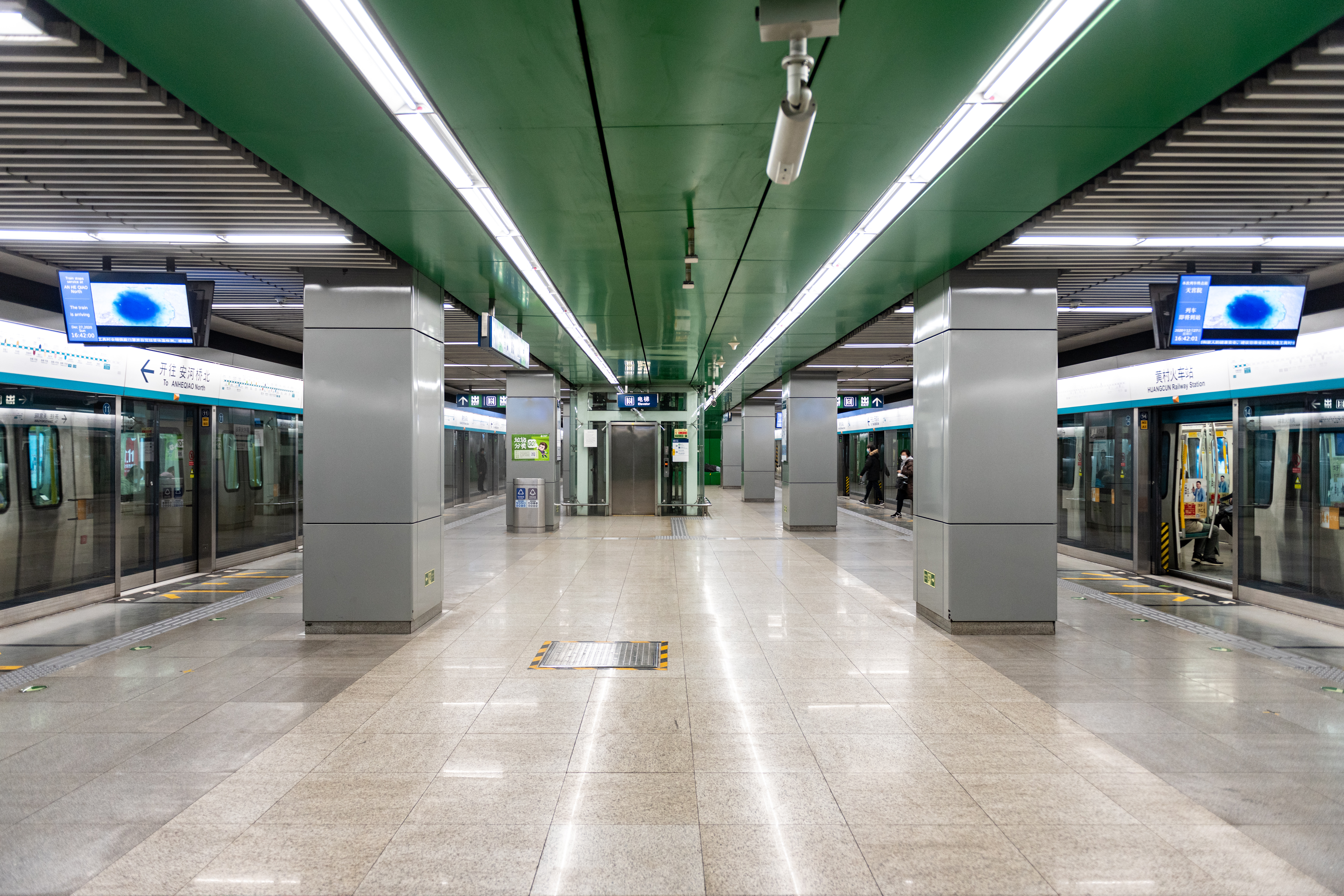
The platforms of the subway station

=== Station layout ===
The station has an underground island platform.

=== Exits ===
There are 4 exits, lettered A, B, C, and D. Exit A is accessible.

== See also ==
Beijing Daxing railway station, a high-speed rail station on Beijing–Xiong'an intercity railway, is located near Huangcun railway station.
