= Huangcun Xidajie station =

Beijing Subway station

Huangcun Xidajie 黄村西大街
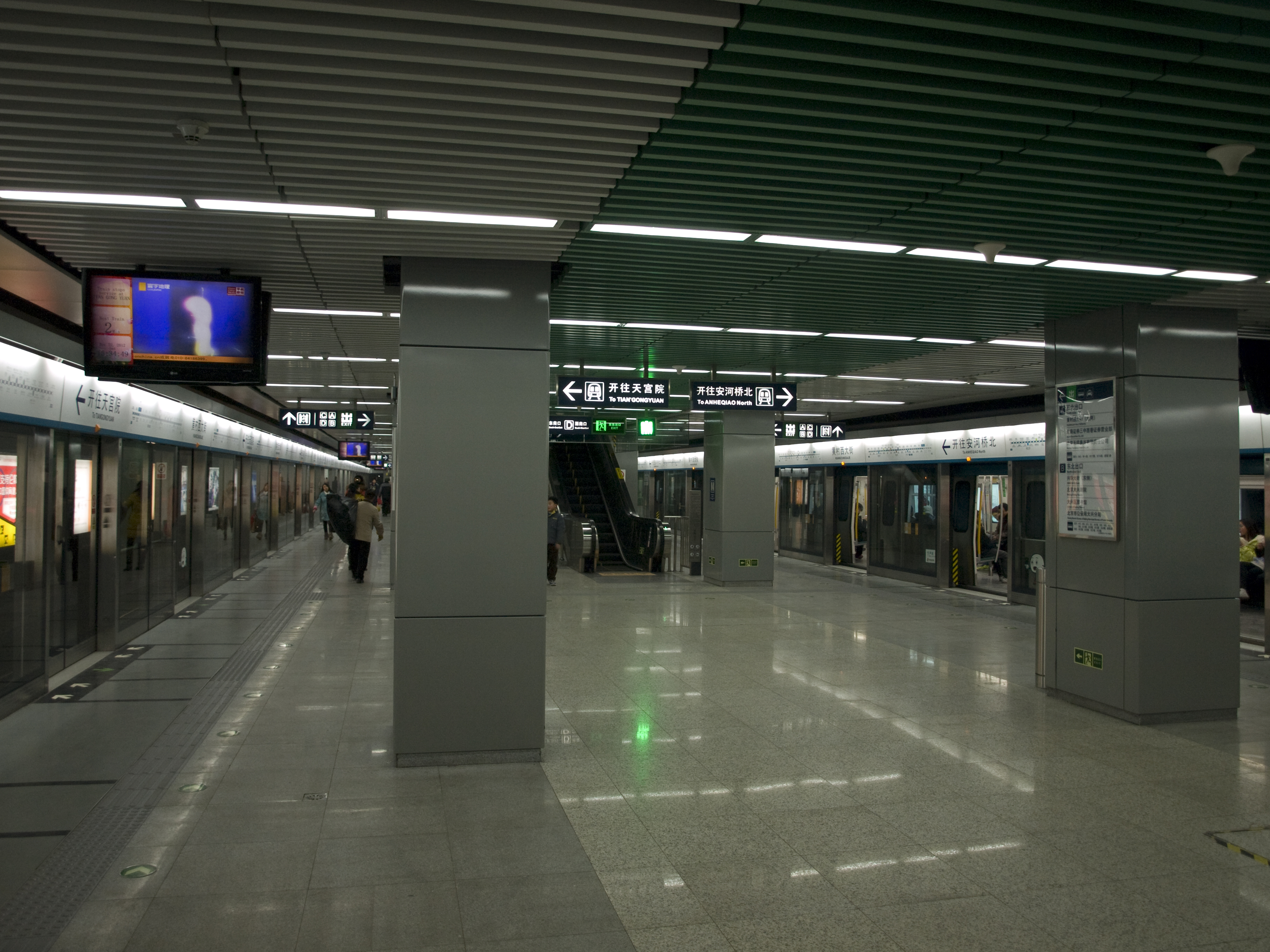
- Platform

General information
- Location: Xinghua Street (兴华大街) and Huangcun West Street (黄村西大街); Daxing District, Beijing; China
- Coordinates: 39°43′56″N 116°19′59″E
- Operator: Beijing MTR Corporation Limited
- Line: Daxing line
- Platforms: 2 (1 island platform)
- Tracks: 2

Construction
- Structure type: Underground
- Accessible: Yes

History
- Opened: December 30, 2010; 15 years ago

Services
Preceding station	Beijing Subway	Following station
Qingyuan Lu towards Anheqiaobei	Daxing line	Huangcun railway station towards Tiangongyuan
Location
- Location within Beijing

Huangcun Xidajie Station (simplified Chinese: 黄村西大街站; traditional Chinese: 黃村西大街站; pinyin: Huángcūn Xīdàjiē Zhàn) is a station on the Daxing line of the Beijing Subway.

== Station layout ==
The station has an underground island platform.

== Exits ==
There are 4 exits, lettered A, B, C, and D. Exit C is accessible.
