= Qingyuan Lu station =

Beijing Subway station

Coordinates: 39°44′34″N 116°19′57″E

Qingyuan Lu 清源路
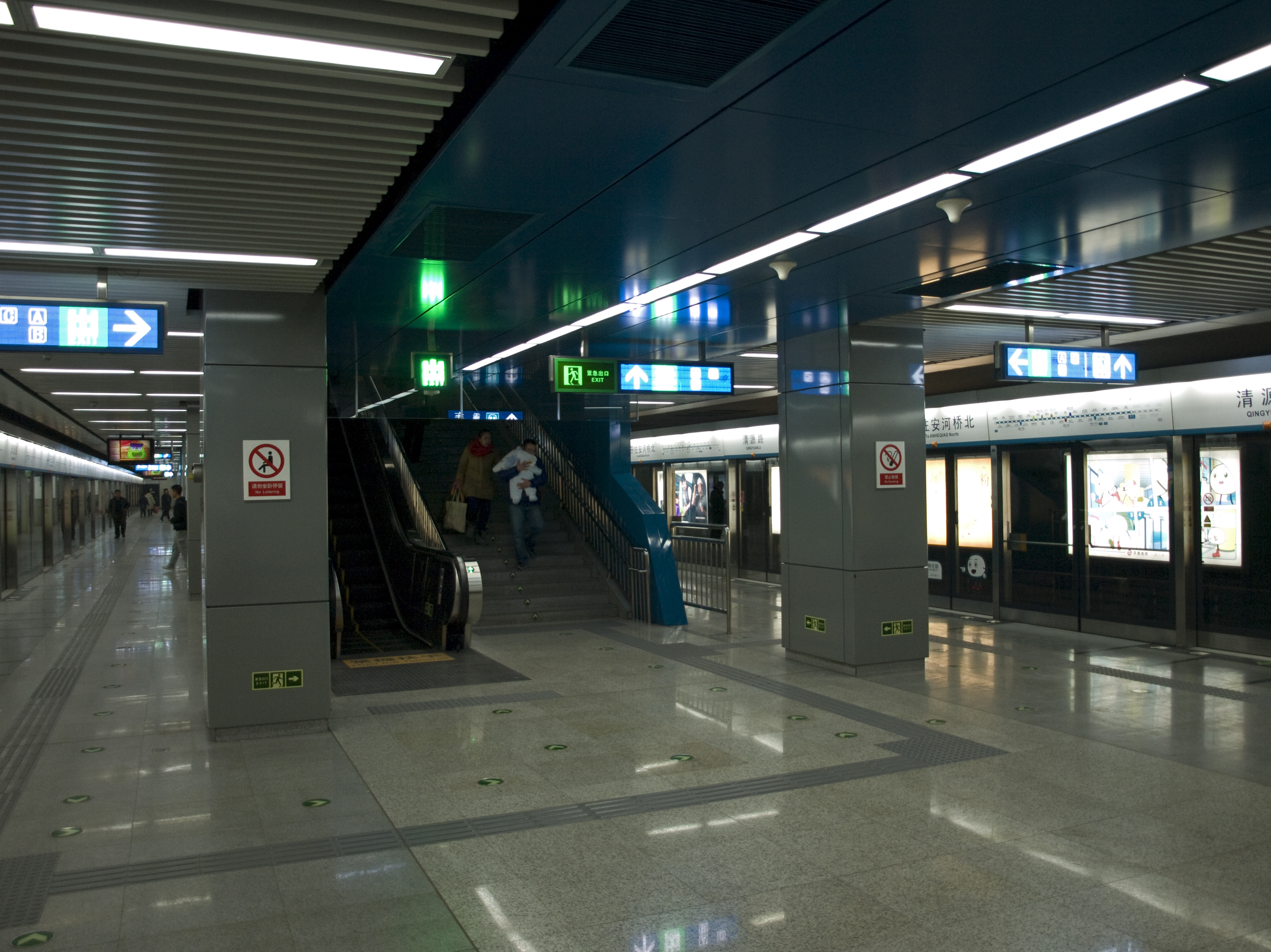
- Platform

General information
- Location: Xinghua Street (兴华大街) and Qingyuan Road (清源路); Daxing District, Beijing; China
- Operator: Beijing MTR Corporation Limited
- Line: Daxing line
- Platforms: 2 (1 island platform)
- Tracks: 2

Construction
- Structure type: Underground
- Accessible: Yes

History
- Opened: December 30, 2010; 15 years ago

Services
Preceding station	Beijing Subway	Following station
Zaoyuan towards Anheqiaobei	Daxing line	Huangcun Xidajie towards Tiangongyuan
Location
- Location within Beijing

Qingyuan Lu Station (Chinese: 清源路站; pinyin: Qīngyuánlù Zhàn) is a station on the Daxing line of the Beijing Subway.

== Station layout ==
The station has an underground island platform.

== Exits ==
There are 3 exits, lettered A, B, and C. Exit C is accessible.
