= Zaoyuan station (Beijing Subway) =

Beijing Subway station

Zaoyuan 枣园
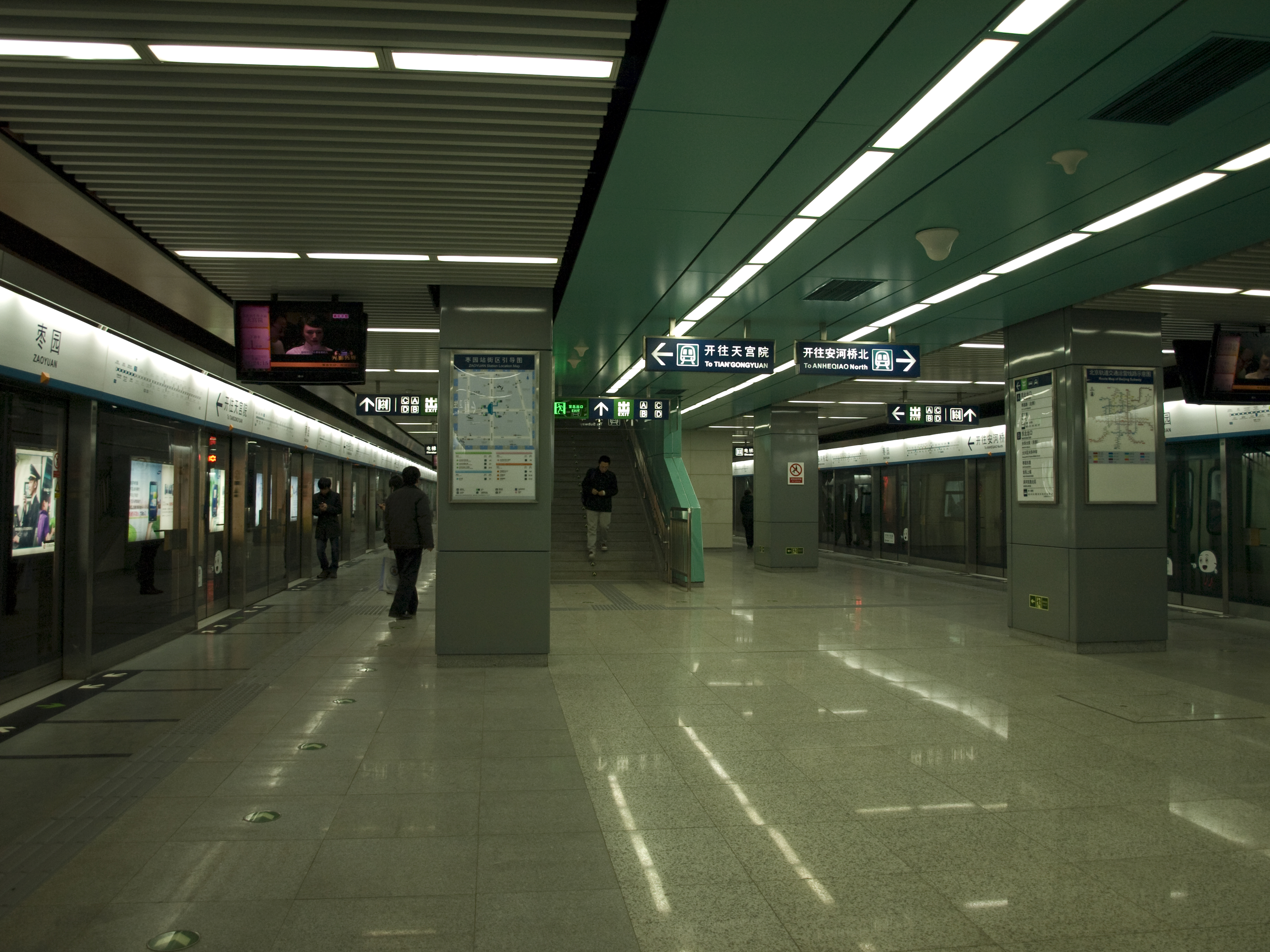
- Platform

General information
- Location: Xinghua Street (兴华大街) and Zaoyuan Road (枣园路); Daxing District, Beijing; China
- Coordinates: 39°45′12″N 116°19′56″E
- Operator: Beijing MTR Corporation Limited
- Line: Daxing line
- Platforms: 2 (1 island platform)
- Tracks: 2

Construction
- Structure type: Underground
- Accessible: Yes

History
- Opened: December 30, 2010; 15 years ago

Services
Preceding station	Beijing Subway	Following station
Gaomidiannan towards Anheqiaobei	Daxing line	Qingyuan Lu towards Tiangongyuan
Location
- Location within Beijing

Zaoyuan Station (simplified Chinese: 枣园站; traditional Chinese: 棗園站; pinyin: Zǎoyuán Zhàn) is a station on the Daxing line of the Beijing Subway.

== Station layout ==
The station has an underground island platform.

== Exits ==
There are 4 exits, lettered A, B, C, and D. Exit C is accessible.
