= Gaomidianbei station =

Beijing Subway station

Gaomidianbei 高米店北
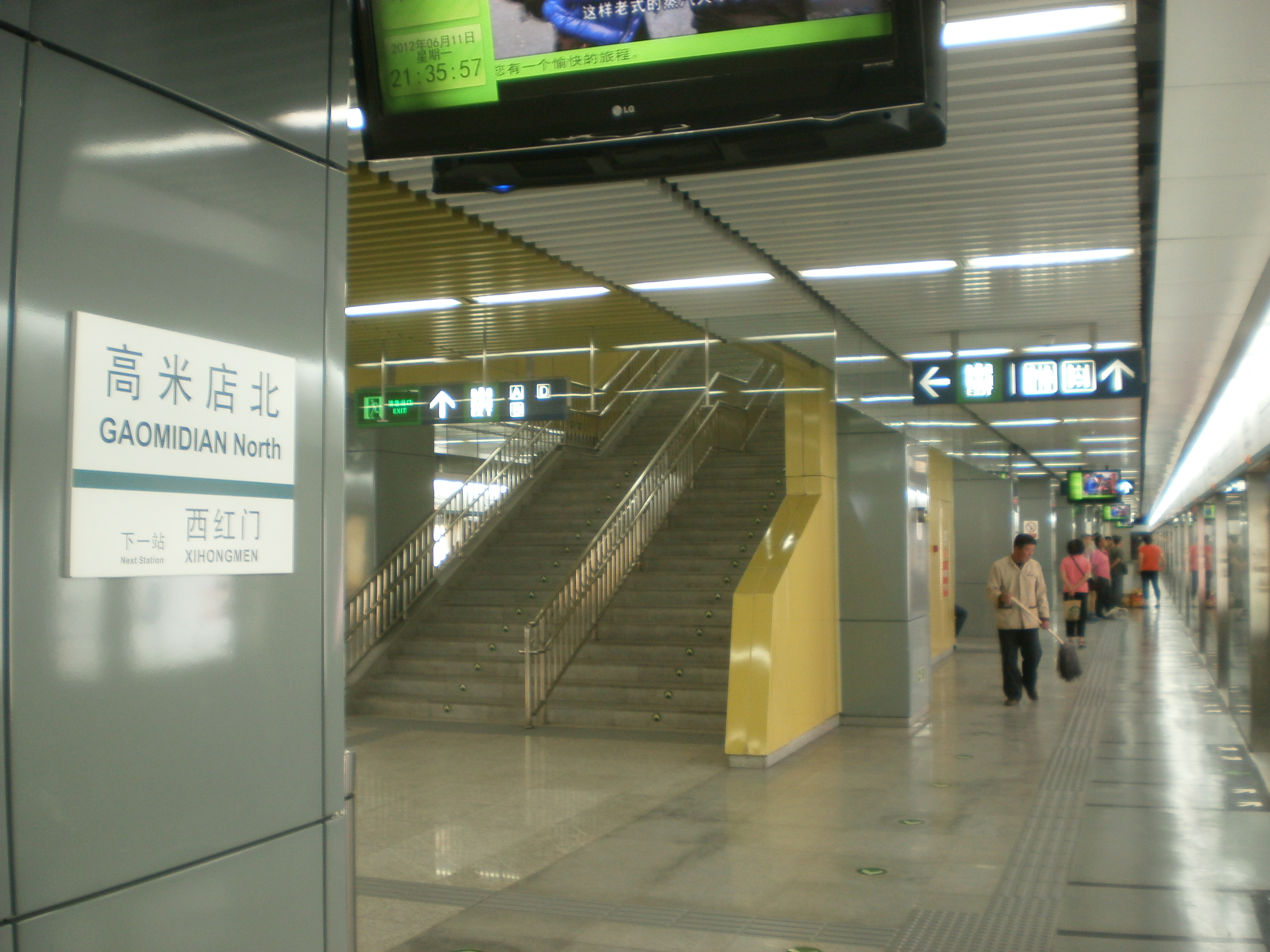
- Platform

General information
- Location: Xinghua Street (兴华大街) north of Xiangyuan Road (香园路); Daxing District, Beijing; China
- Coordinates: 39°46′25″N 116°19′51″E
- Operator: Beijing MTR Corporation Limited
- Line: Daxing line
- Platforms: 2 (1 island platform)
- Tracks: 2

Construction
- Structure type: Underground
- Accessible: Yes

History
- Opened: December 30, 2010; 15 years ago

Services
Preceding station	Beijing Subway	Following station
Xihong Men towards Anheqiaobei	Daxing line	Gaomidiannan towards Tiangongyuan
Location
- Location within Beijing

Gaomidianbei Station (Chinese: 高米店北站; pinyin: Gāomǐdiàn Běi Zhàn) is a station on the Daxing line of the Beijing Subway.

== Station layout ==
The station has an underground island platform.

== Exits ==
There are 4 exits, lettered A, B1, B2, and D. Exit A is accessible.
