= Xinjie Kou station =

Beijing Subway station

Xinjie Kou 新街口
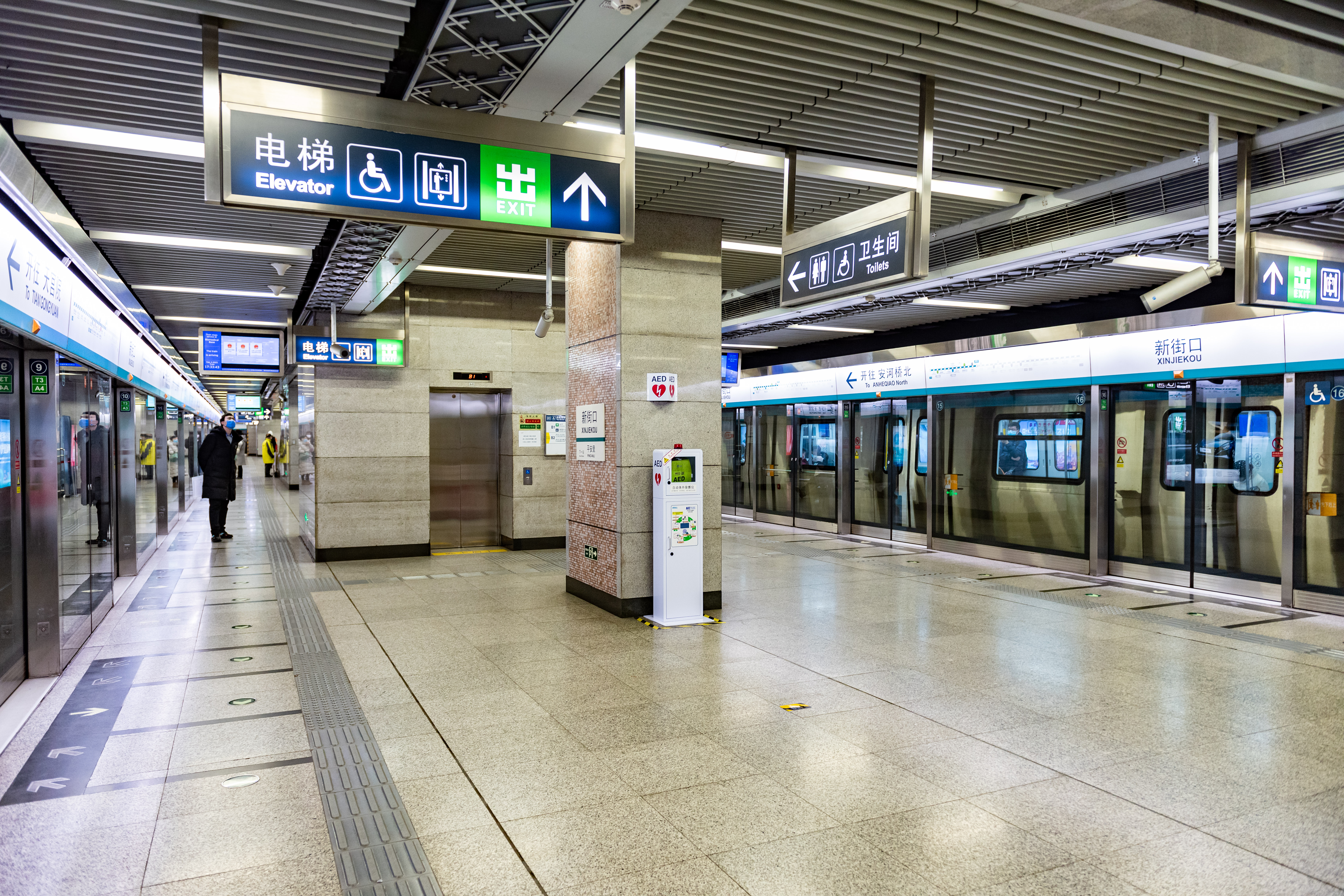
- Platform

General information
- Location: Xizhimen Inner Street and Zhaodengyu Road; Xicheng District, Beijing; China
- Coordinates: 39.9405°N 116.3673°E
- Operator: Beijing MTR Corporation Limited
- Line: Line 4
- Platforms: 2 (1 island platform)
- Tracks: 2

Construction
- Structure type: Underground
- Accessible: Yes

History
- Opened: September 28, 2009; 16 years ago

Services
Preceding station	Beijing Subway	Following station
Xizhimen towards Anheqiaobei	Line 4	Ping'anli towards Tiangong Yuan
Location
- Location within Beijing

Xinjie Kou station (Chinese: 新街口站; pinyin: Xīnjiē Kǒu Zhàn) is a station on Line 4 of the Beijing Subway.

== Station layout ==
The station has an underground island platform.

== Exits ==
There are 4 exits, lettered A, B, C, and D. Exit B is accessible.
