= Peking Univ East Gate station =

Beijing Subway station

Coordinates: 39°59′32″N 116°18′57″E

Peking Univ. East Gate 北京大学东门
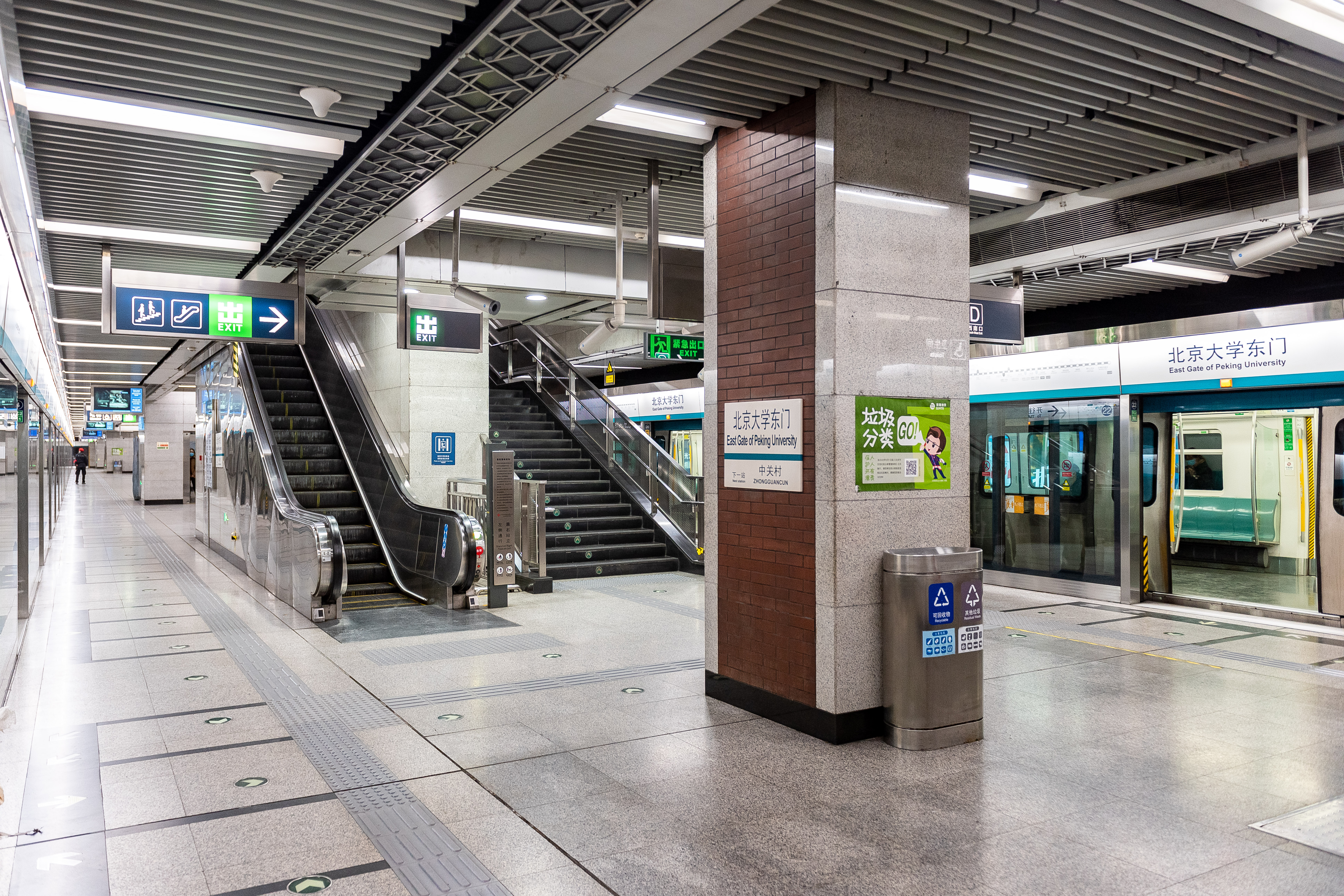
- Platform

General information
- Location: Zhongguancun North Street and Chengfu Road; Haidian District, Beijing; China
- Operator: Beijing MTR Corporation Limited
- Line: Line 4
- Platforms: 2 (1 island platform)
- Tracks: 2

Construction
- Structure type: Underground
- Accessible: Yes

History
- Opened: September 28, 2009; 17 years ago
- Former names: East Gate of Peking University

Services
Preceding station	Beijing Subway	Following station
Yuanmingyuan Park towards Anheqiaobei	Line 4	Zhongguancun towards Tiangong Yuan
Location
- Location within Beijing

Peking Univ. East Gate station (simplified Chinese: 北京大学东门站; traditional Chinese: 北京大學東門站; pinyin: Běijīng Dàxué Dōngmén zhàn) is a station on Line 4 of the Beijing Subway. The station is located just outside the east gate of Peking University.

== Station layout ==
The station has an underground island platform. There are four exits, one of which has an elevator.
