= Yuanmingyuan Park station =

Beijing Subway station

Coordinates: 39°59′59″N 116°18′37″E

Yuanmingyuan Park 圆明园
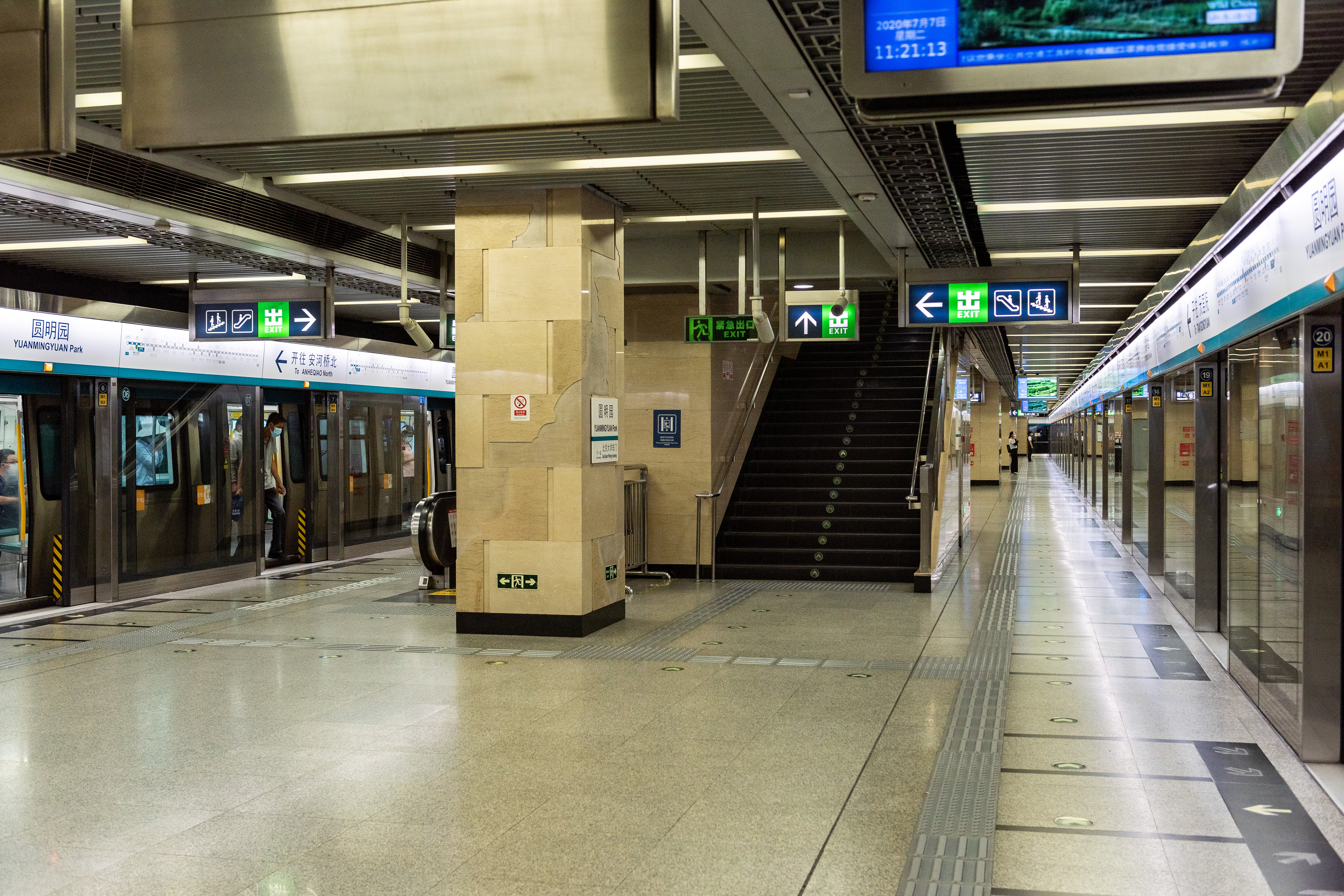
- Platform in July 2020

General information
- Location: West Qinghua Road (清华西路); Haidian District, Beijing; China
- Operator: Beijing MTR Corporation Limited
- Line: Line 4
- Platforms: 2 (1 island platform)
- Tracks: 2

Construction
- Structure type: Underground
- Accessible: Yes

History
- Opened: September 28, 2009

Services
Preceding station	Beijing Subway	Following station
Xiyuan towards Anheqiaobei	Line 4	Peking Univ. East Gate towards Tiangong Yuan
Location
- Location within Beijing

Yuanmingyuan Park station (simplified Chinese: 圆明园站; traditional Chinese: 圓明園站; pinyin: Yuánmíngyuán zhàn) is a station on Line 4 of the Beijing Subway. The station is located outside of the south entrance to the Old Summer Palace in Haidian District of Beijing, and immediately faces the Zhengjue Temple (正觉寺) to the north; the main campus of Peking University is to the south. There are three station exits: A, B, and C.

== Station layout ==
The station has an underground island platform.

== Exits ==
There are 3 exits, lettered A, B, and C. Exit C is accessible.

== Gallery ==
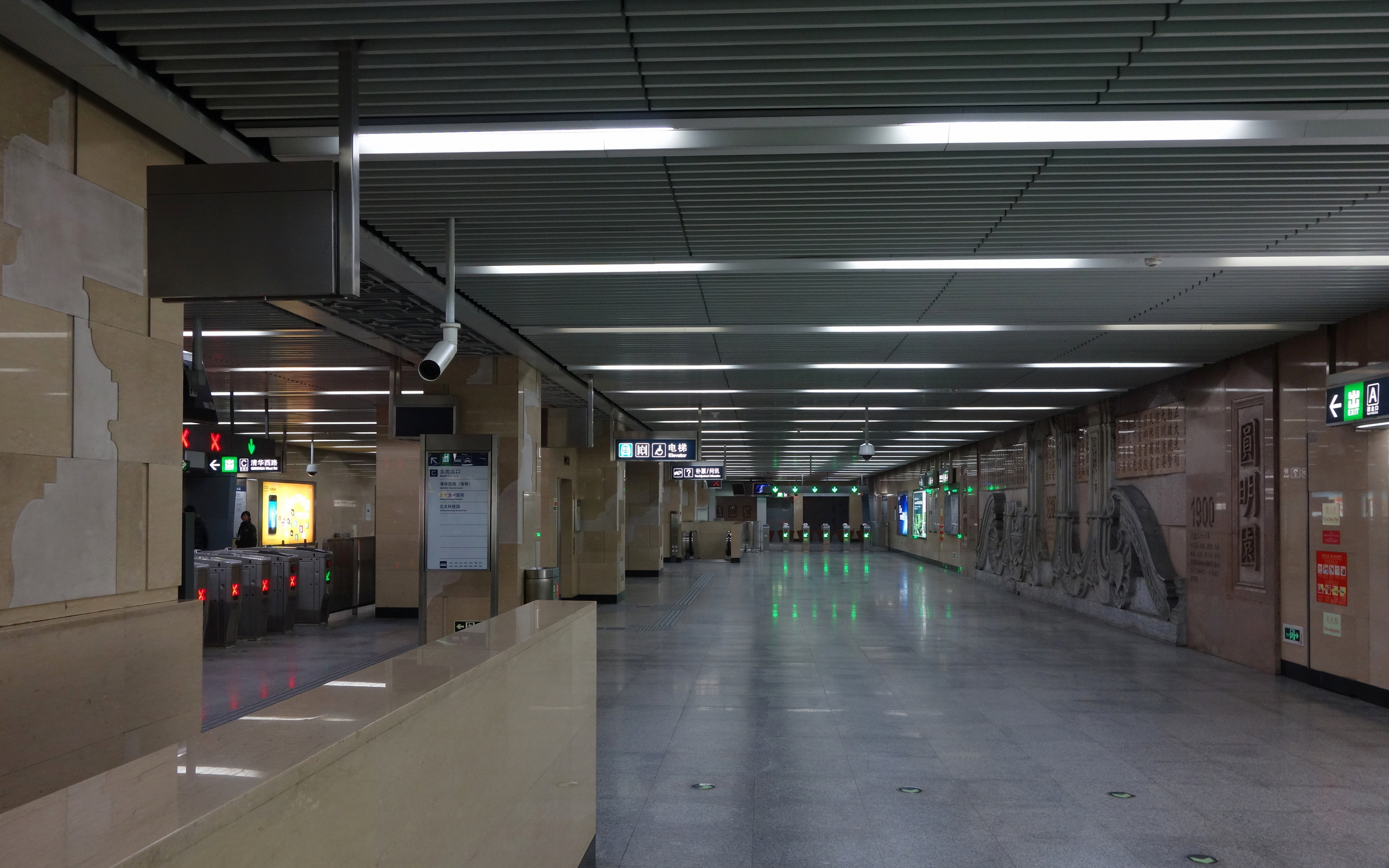
Concourse
