= Biomedical Base station =

Beijing Subway station

Coordinates: 39°41′11″N 116°19′18″E

Biomedical Base 生物医药基地
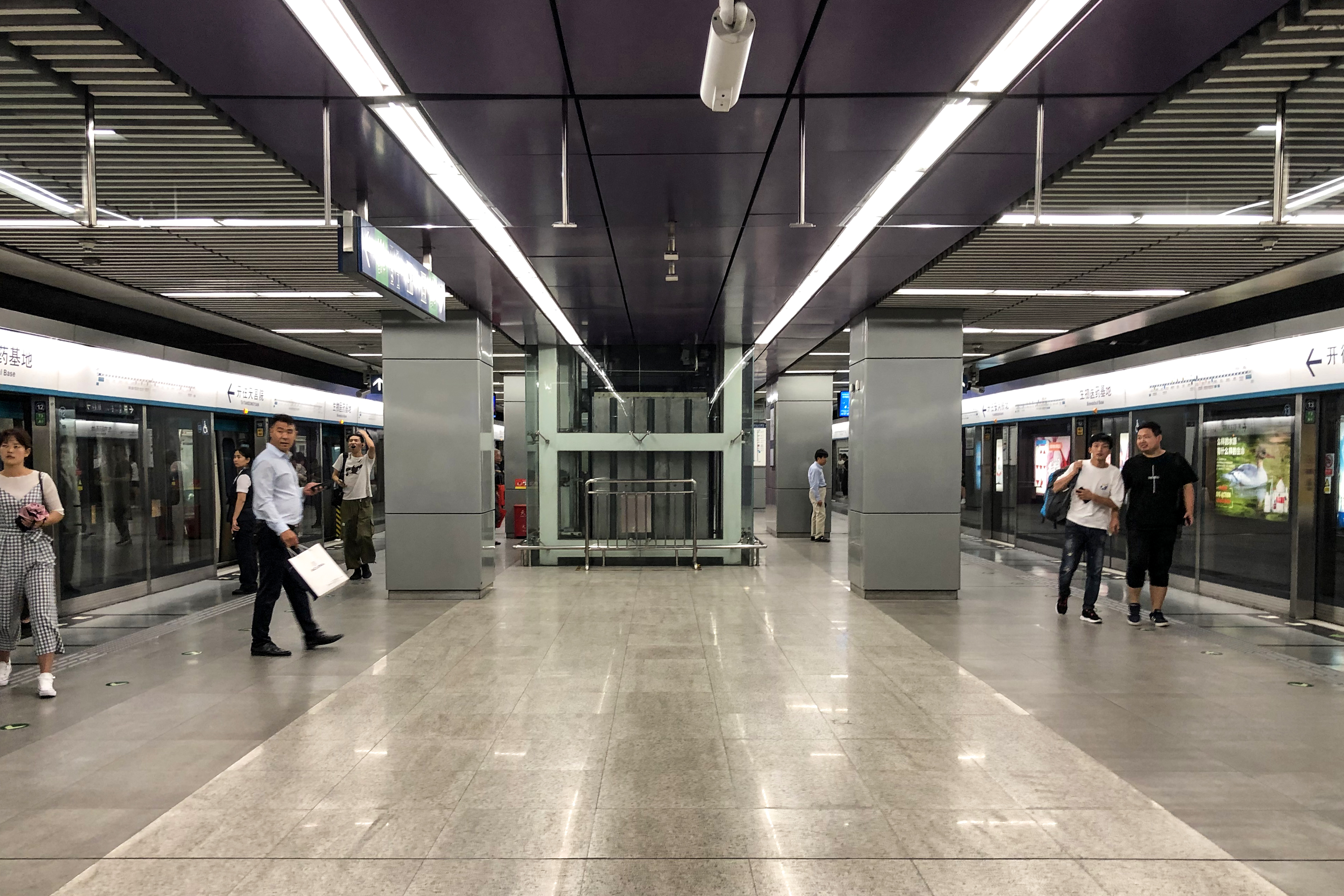
- Platform

General information
- Location: Xinyuan Street (新源大街); Daxing District, Beijing; China
- Operator: Beijing MTR Corporation Limited
- Line: Daxing line
- Platforms: 2 (1 island platform)
- Tracks: 2

Construction
- Structure type: Underground
- Accessible: Yes

History
- Opened: December 30, 2010; 15 years ago

Services
Preceding station	Beijing Subway	Following station
Yihezhuang towards Anheqiaobei	Daxing line	Tiangongyuan Terminus
Location
- Location within Beijing

Biomedical Base station (simplified Chinese: 生物医药基地站; traditional Chinese: 生物醫藥基地站; pinyin: Shēngwùyīyào Jīdì Zhàn) is a station on the Daxing line of the Beijing Subway.

== Station layout ==
The station has an underground island platform.

== Exits ==
There are four exits, lettered A, B, C, and D. Exit B is accessible.
