= Beigongmen station =

Beijing Subway station

Coordinates: 40°00′09″N 116°16′40″E

Beigongmen 北宫门
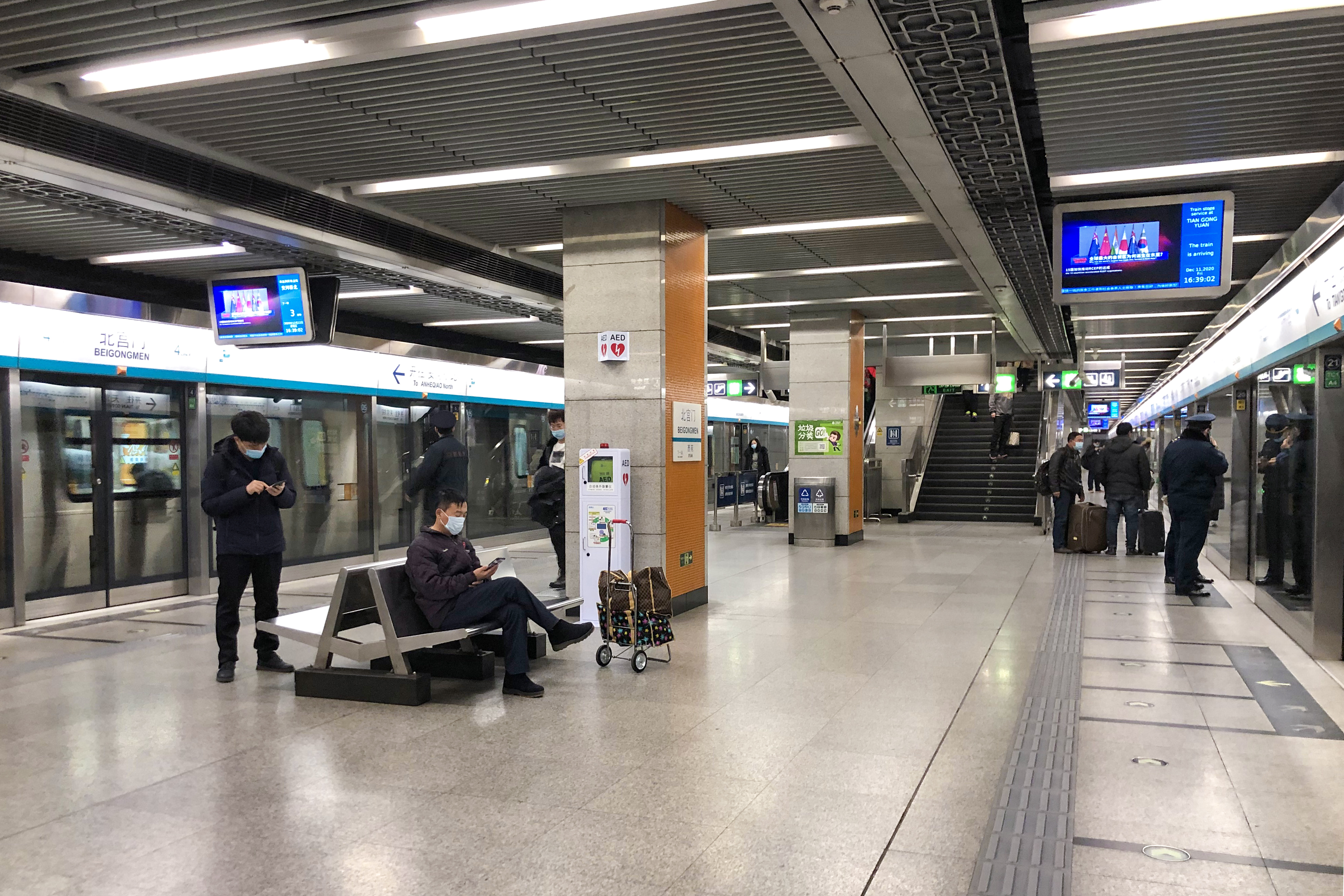
- Platform

General information
- Location: Yiheyuan Road (颐和园路); Haidian District, Beijing; China
- Operator: Beijing MTR Corporation Limited
- Line: Line 4
- Platforms: 2 (1 island platform)
- Tracks: 2

Construction
- Structure type: Underground
- Accessible: Yes

History
- Opened: September 28, 2009

Services
Preceding station	Beijing Subway	Following station
Anheqiaobei towards Anheqiaobei	Line 4	Xiyuan towards Tiangong Yuan
Location
- Location within Beijing

Beigongmen Station (simplified Chinese: 北宫门站; traditional Chinese: 北宮門站; pinyin: Běigōngmén Zhàn) is a station on Line 4 of the Beijing Subway. The station provides close access to the North Gate of the Summer Palace.

== Station layout ==
The station has an underground island platform.

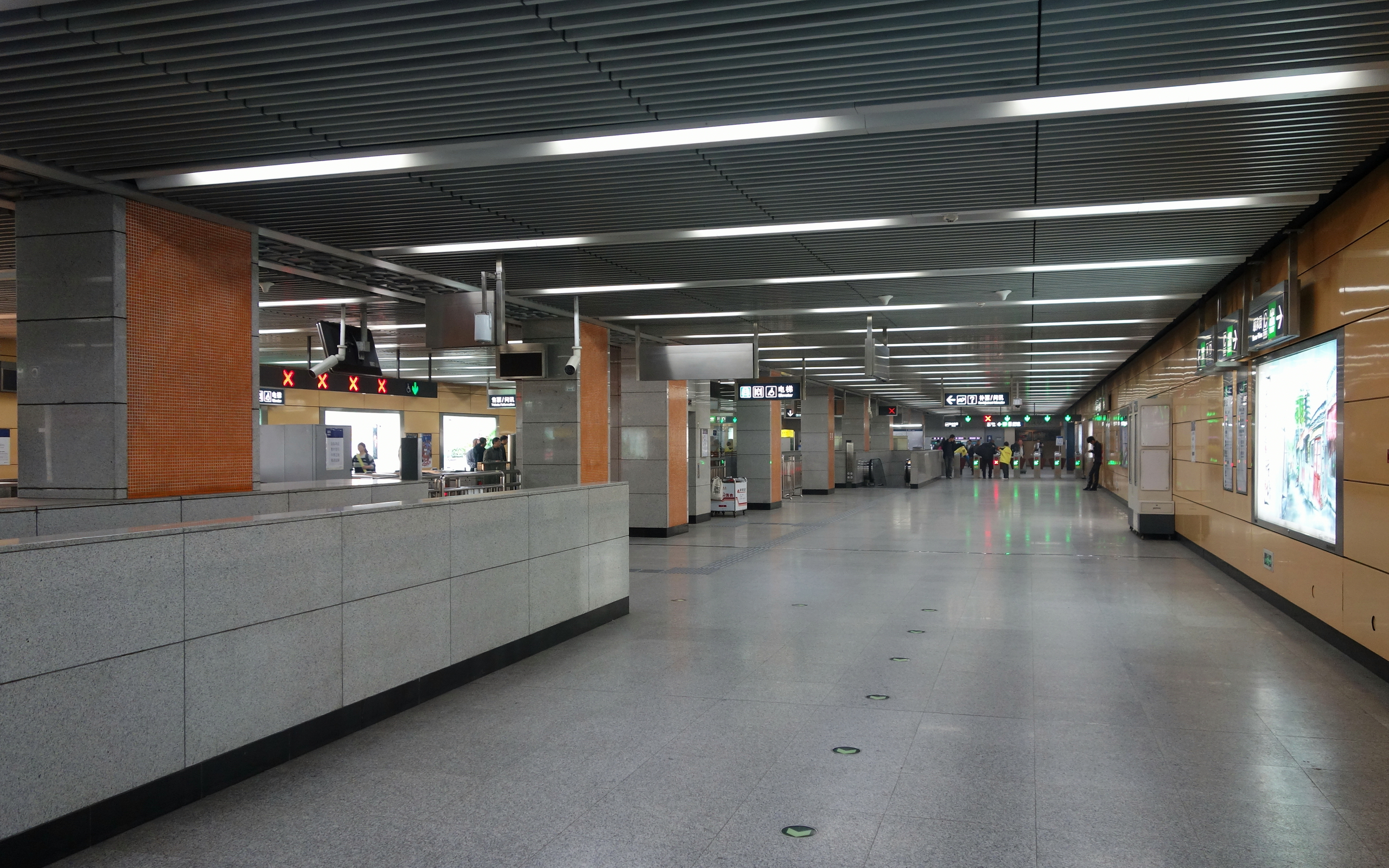
Beigongmen Station Hall

== Exits ==
There are 4 exits, lettered A1, A2, C, and D. Exit C is accessible.
