= Liying railway station =

Railway station in Beijing, China

Liying 李营
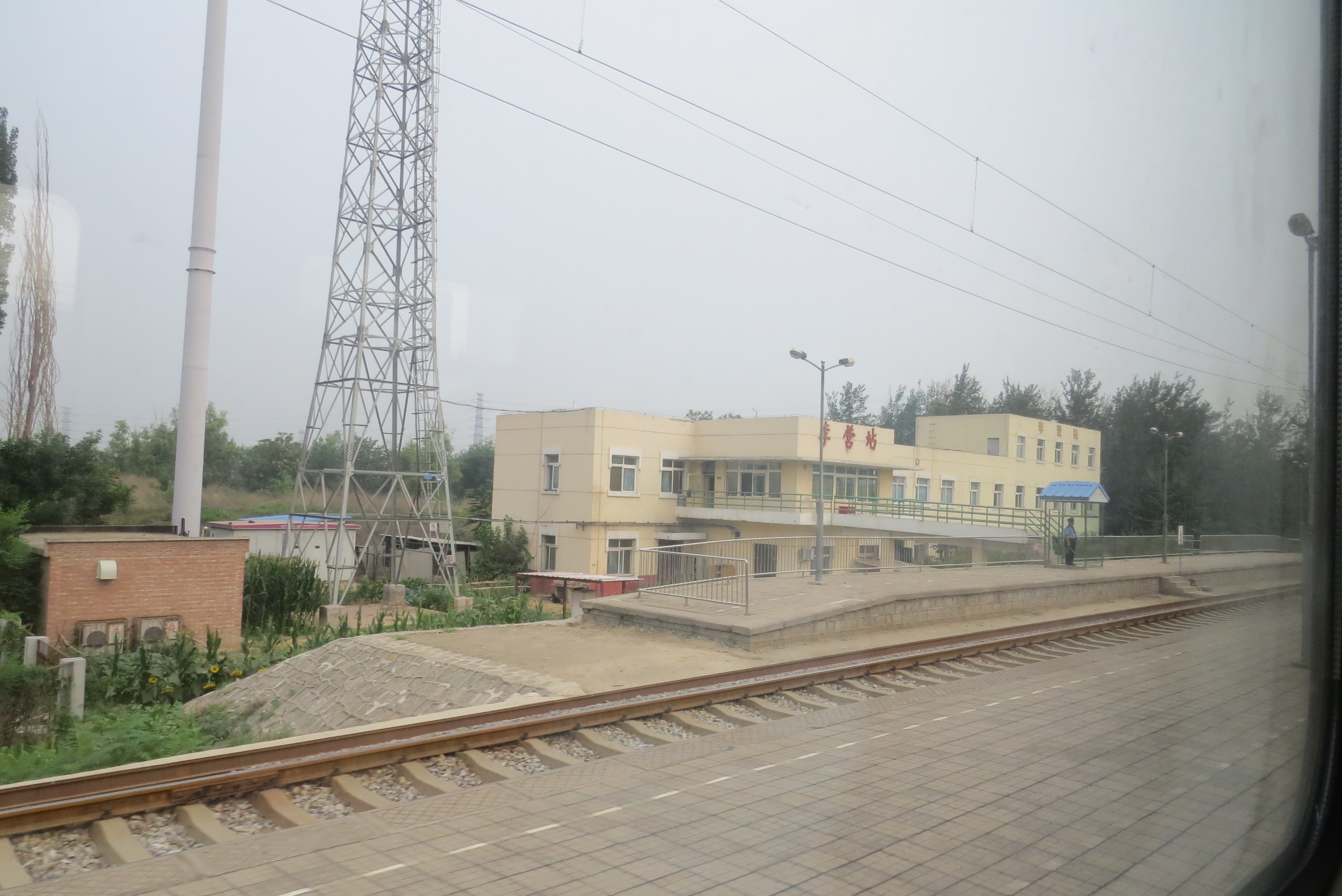
- The platform of Liying railway station

General information
- Location: Xingwang Rd, Daxing District, Beijing; China
- Coordinates: 39°46′35.12″N 116°18′50.53″E
- Operated by: China Railway
- Line: Beijing–Kowloon Railway
- Platforms: 2

Other information
- Station code: TMIS code: 24710; Telegraph code: UYP; Pinyin code: LYI

History
- Opened: 2001

Services
Preceding station	China Railway	Following station
Guang'anmen towards Beijing West	Beijing–Kowloon railway	Huangcun towards Hung Hom
Location

Liying railway station (simplified Chinese: 李营站; traditional Chinese: 李營站; pinyin: Lǐyíng Zhàn; station code: 24710) is a train station on the Beijing–Kowloon Railway in Daxing District, Beijing. This station has no passenger services since its completion in 2001.

Beijing–Shanghai High-Speed Railway is parallel to Beijing–Kowloon Railway near this station.
