= Anheqiaobei station =

Beijing Subway station

Coordinates: 40°00′44″N 116°16′12″E

Anheqiaobei 安河桥北
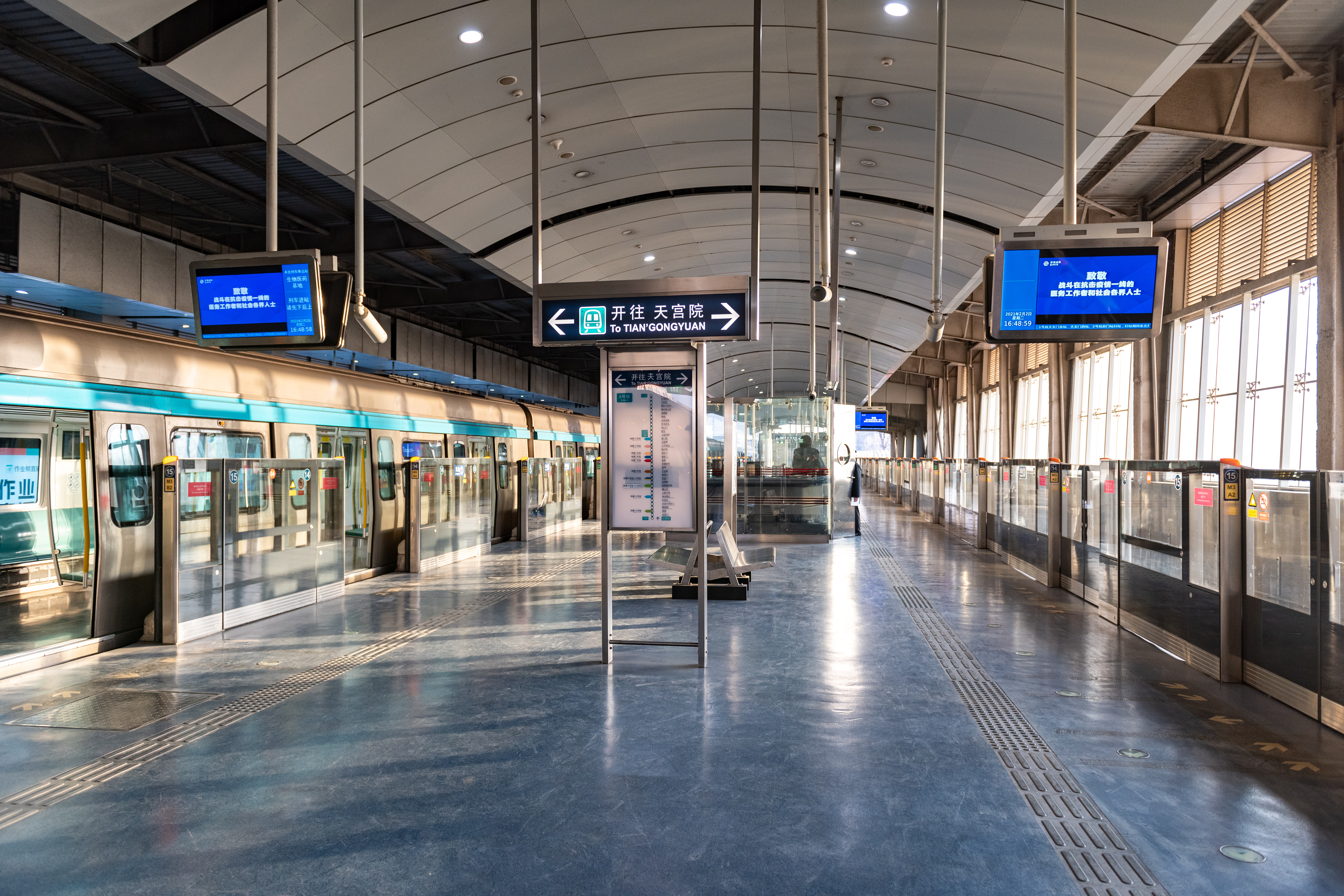
- Southbound platform

General information
- Location: Qinglongqiao Subdistrict, Haidian District, Beijing; China
- Operator: Beijing MTR Corporation Limited
- Line: Line 4
- Platforms: 3 (1 island platform and 1 side platform)
- Tracks: 3

Construction
- Structure type: At-grade
- Accessible: Yes

History
- Opened: September 28, 2009

Services
Preceding station	Beijing Subway	Following station
Terminus	Line 4	Beigongmen towards Tiangong Yuan
Location
- Location within Beijing

Anheqiaobei station (simplified Chinese: 安河桥北站; traditional Chinese: 安河橋北站; pinyin: Ānhéqiáo Běi zhàn) is a station on Line 4 of the Beijing Subway. It is the northern terminus of Line 4 and located just outside the northwest corner of the 5th Ring Road. It is the only station on Line 4 built above-ground and has separated platforms.

== Station layout ==
The station has one island platform and one side platform on street level.

== Exits ==
There are four exits, lettered A, B, C, and D. Exits A and B are accessible.
