= Tiangong Yuan station =

Beijing Subway station

Tiangong Yuan 天宫院
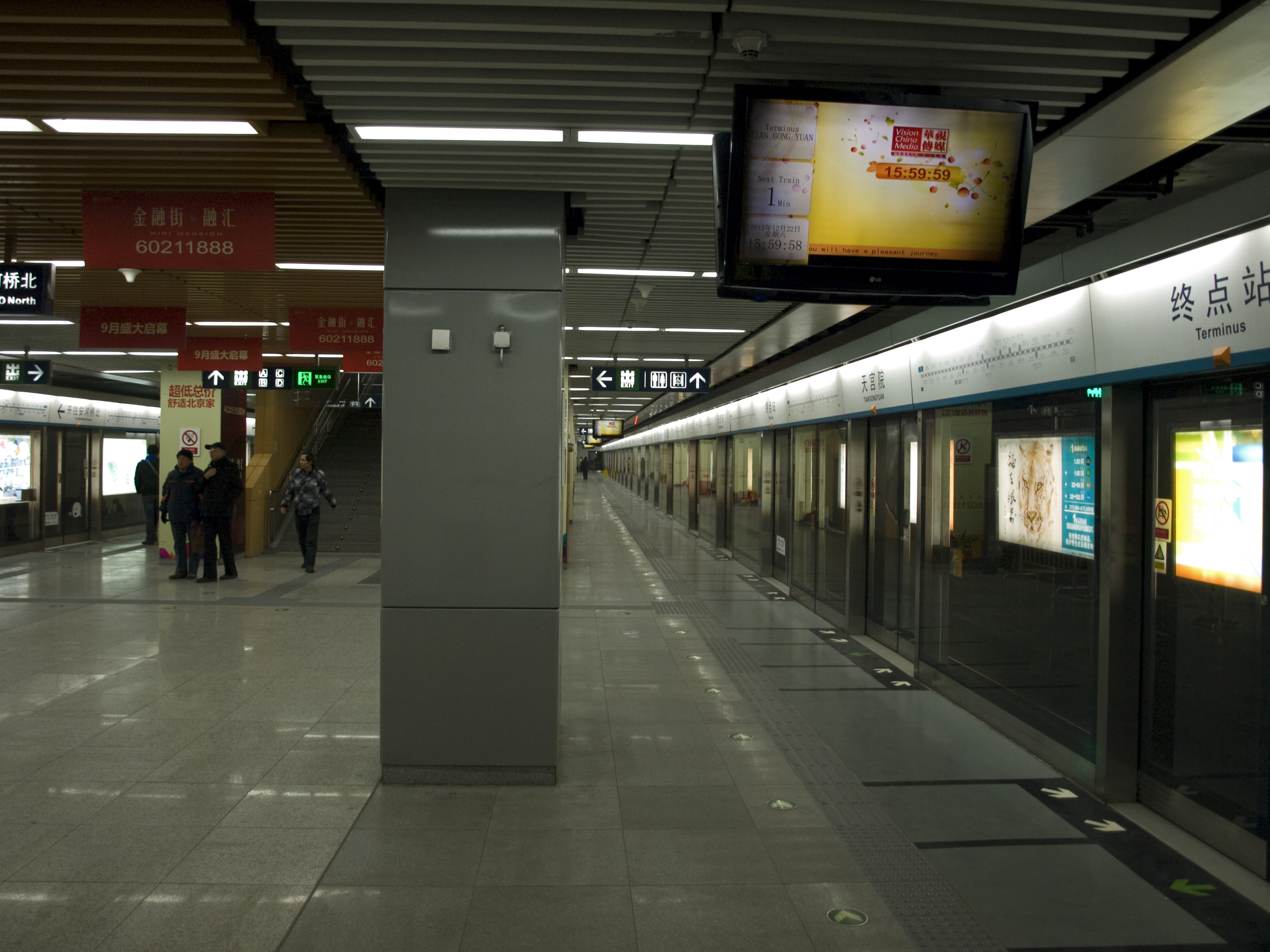
- Platform

General information
- Location: Xinyuan Street (新源大街) & Simiao Road (思邈路); Tiangongyuan Subdistrict, Daxing District, Beijing; China
- Coordinates: 39°40′13″N 116°19′12″E
- Operator: Beijing MTR Corporation Limited
- Line: Daxing line
- Platforms: 2 (1 island platform)
- Tracks: 2

Construction
- Structure type: Underground
- Accessible: Yes

History
- Opened: December 30, 2010; 15 years ago

Services
Preceding station	Beijing Subway	Following station
Biomedical Base towards Anheqiaobei	Daxing line	Terminus
Location
- Location within Beijing

Tiangong Yuan station (simplified Chinese: 天宫院站; traditional Chinese: 天宮院站; pinyin: Tiāngōng Yuàn Zhàn) is a station on and the southern terminus of the Daxing line of the Beijing Subway. The station is located at the intersection of Xinyuan Street and Simiao Road.

== Station layout ==
The station has an underground island platform.

== Exits ==
There are four exits, lettered A, B, C, and D. Exit D is accessible.
