= Jiaomenxi station =

Beijing Subway interchange station

Coordinates: 39.8458°N 116.3712°E

Jiaomenxi 角门西
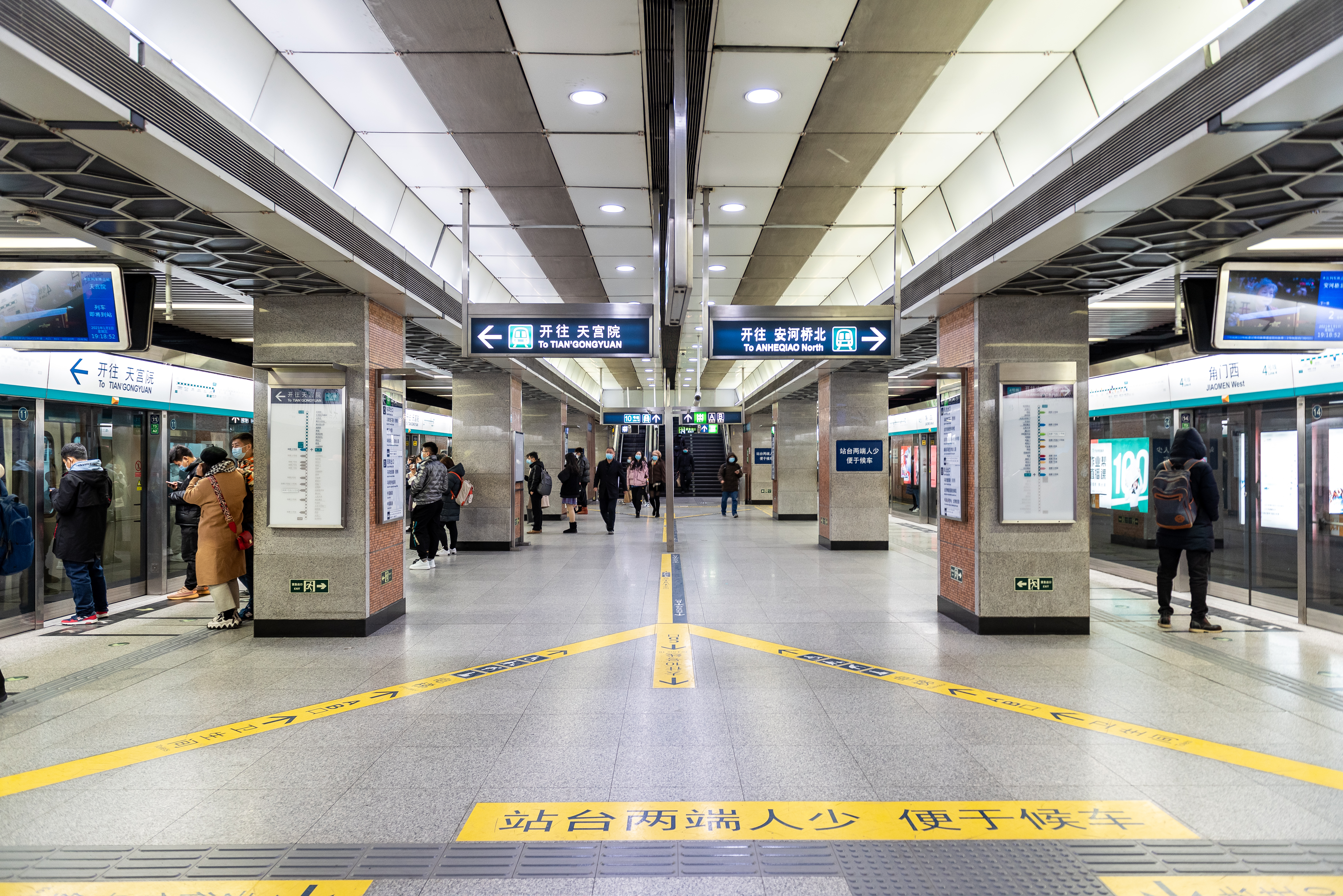
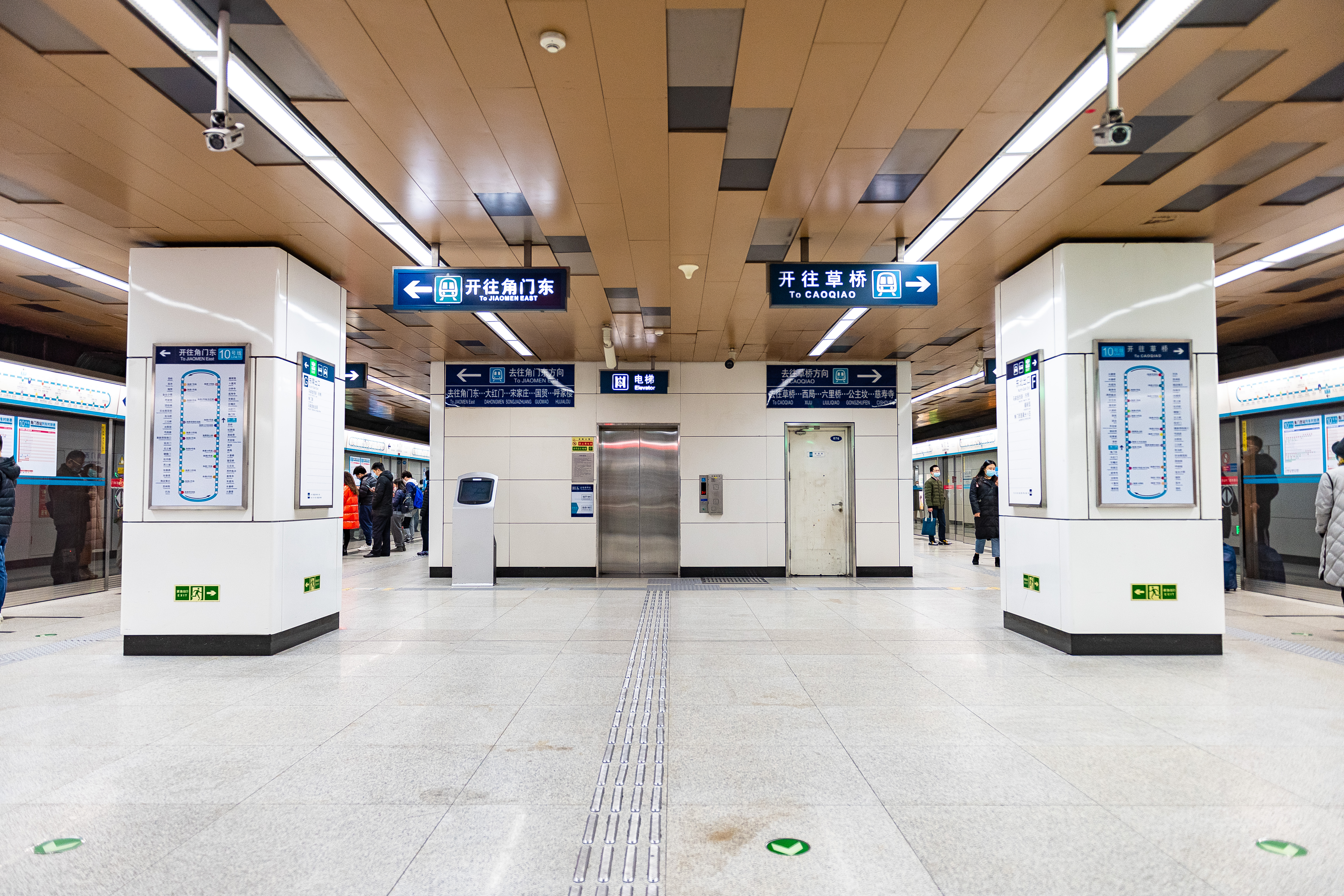
- Line 4 platform Line 10 platform

General information
- Location: Majiapu West Road and Jiahe Road (嘉和路); Fengtai District, Beijing; China
- Operator: Beijing MTR Corporation Limited (Line 4); Beijing Mass Transit Railway Operation Corporation Limited (Line 10)
- Lines: Line 4; Line 10
- Platforms: 4 (2 island platforms)
- Tracks: 4

Construction
- Structure type: Underground
- Accessible: Yes

History
- Opened: September 28, 2009; 16 years ago (Line 4); December 30, 2012; 13 years ago (Line 10)

Services
Preceding station	Beijing Subway	Following station
Majiapu towards Anheqiaobei	Line 4	Gongyi Xiqiao towards Tiangong Yuan
Jiaomendong outer loop / anticlockwise	Line 10	Caoqiao inner loop / clockwise
Location
- Location within Beijing

Jiaomenxi Station (simplified Chinese: 角门西站; traditional Chinese: 角門西站; pinyin: Jiǎoménxī Zhàn) is a subway station of the Beijing Subway. This is an interchange between Lines 4 and 10. The station handles 91,600 transfers between Lines 4 and 10 per day.

== Station layout ==
Both the line 4 and line 10 stations have underground island platforms.

== Exits ==
There are 8 exits, lettered A1, A2, B, C, D, E, F, and G. Exits A2 and G are accessible.

== Gallery ==
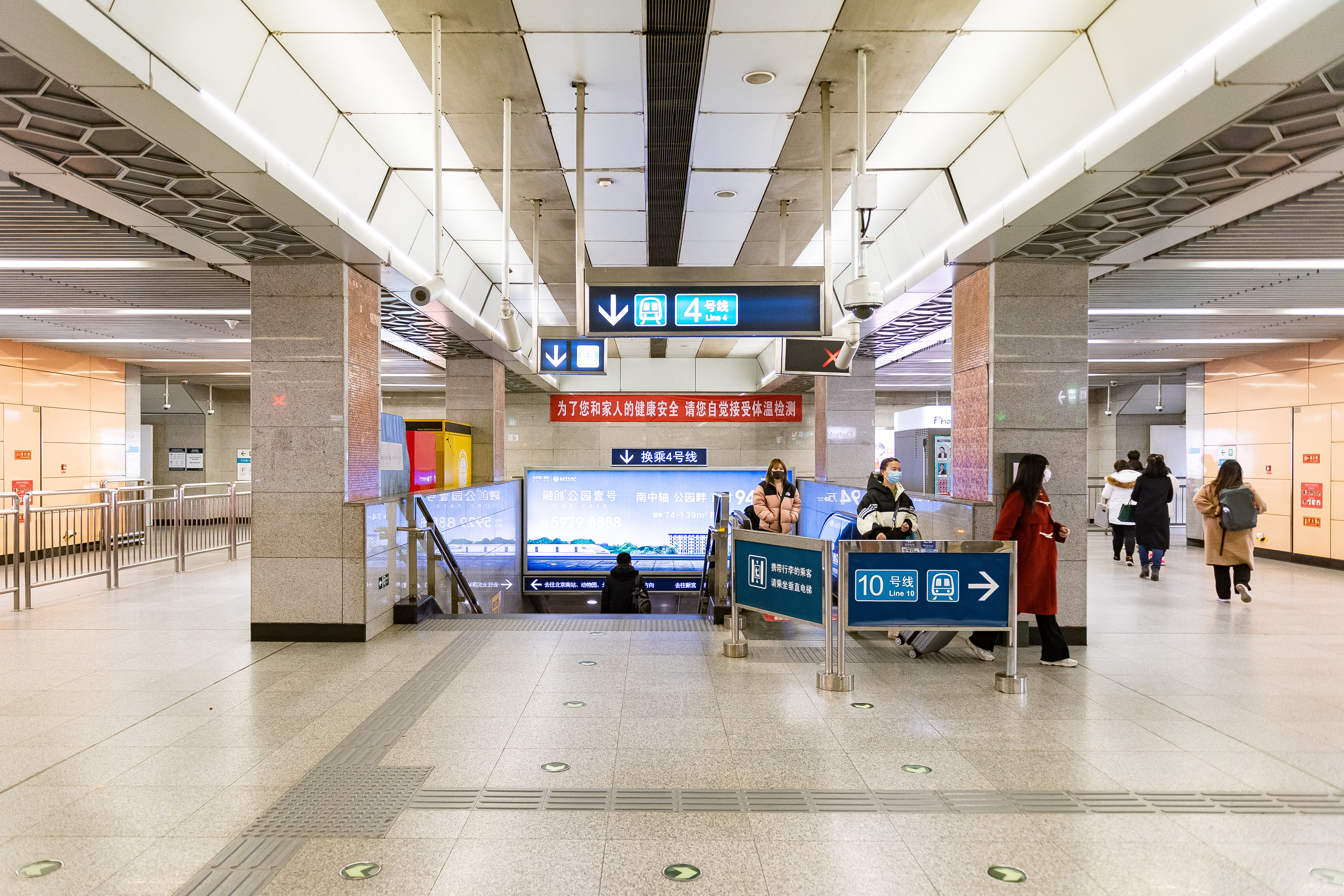
Line 4 north concourse

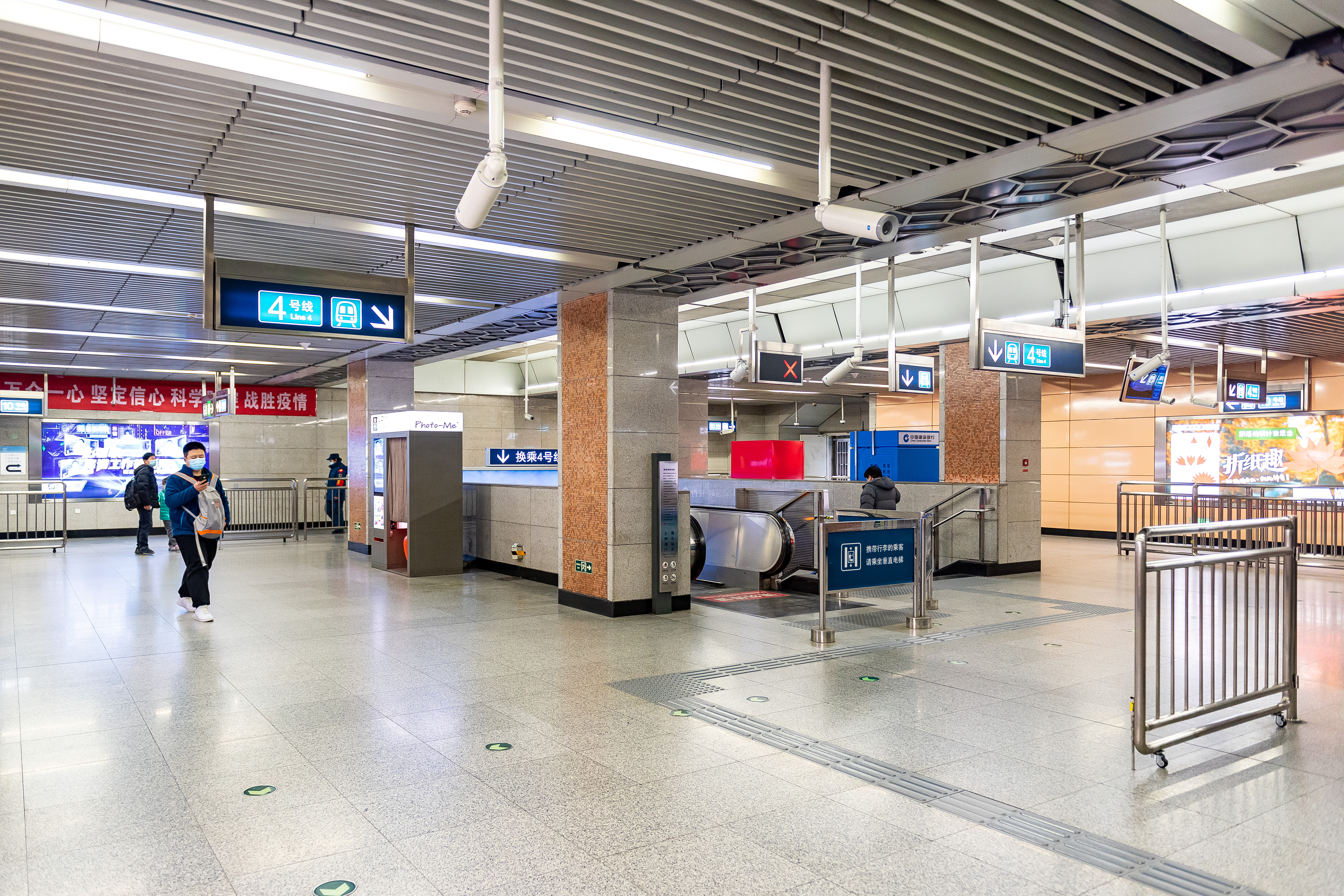
Line 4 south concourse

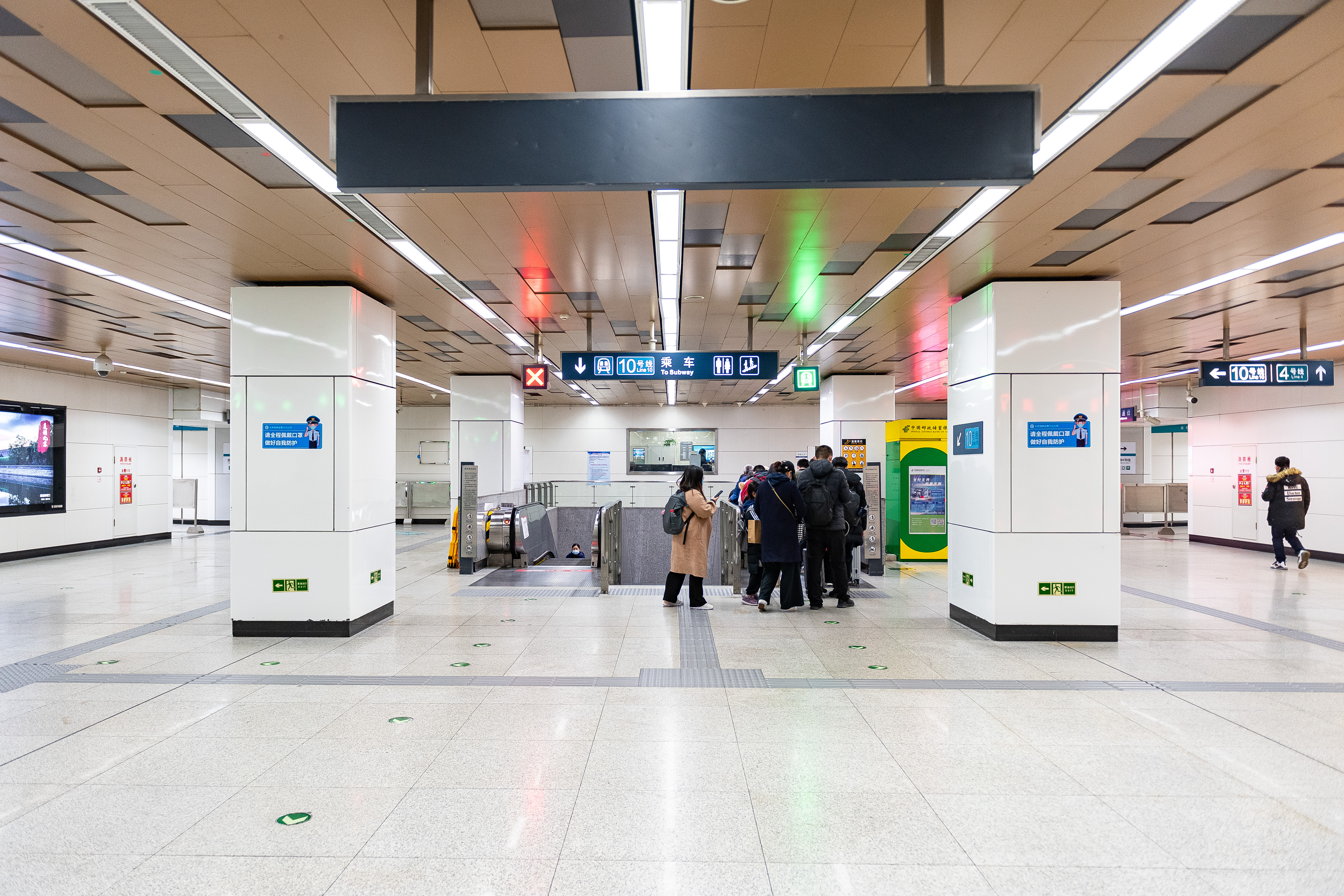
Line 10 west concourse

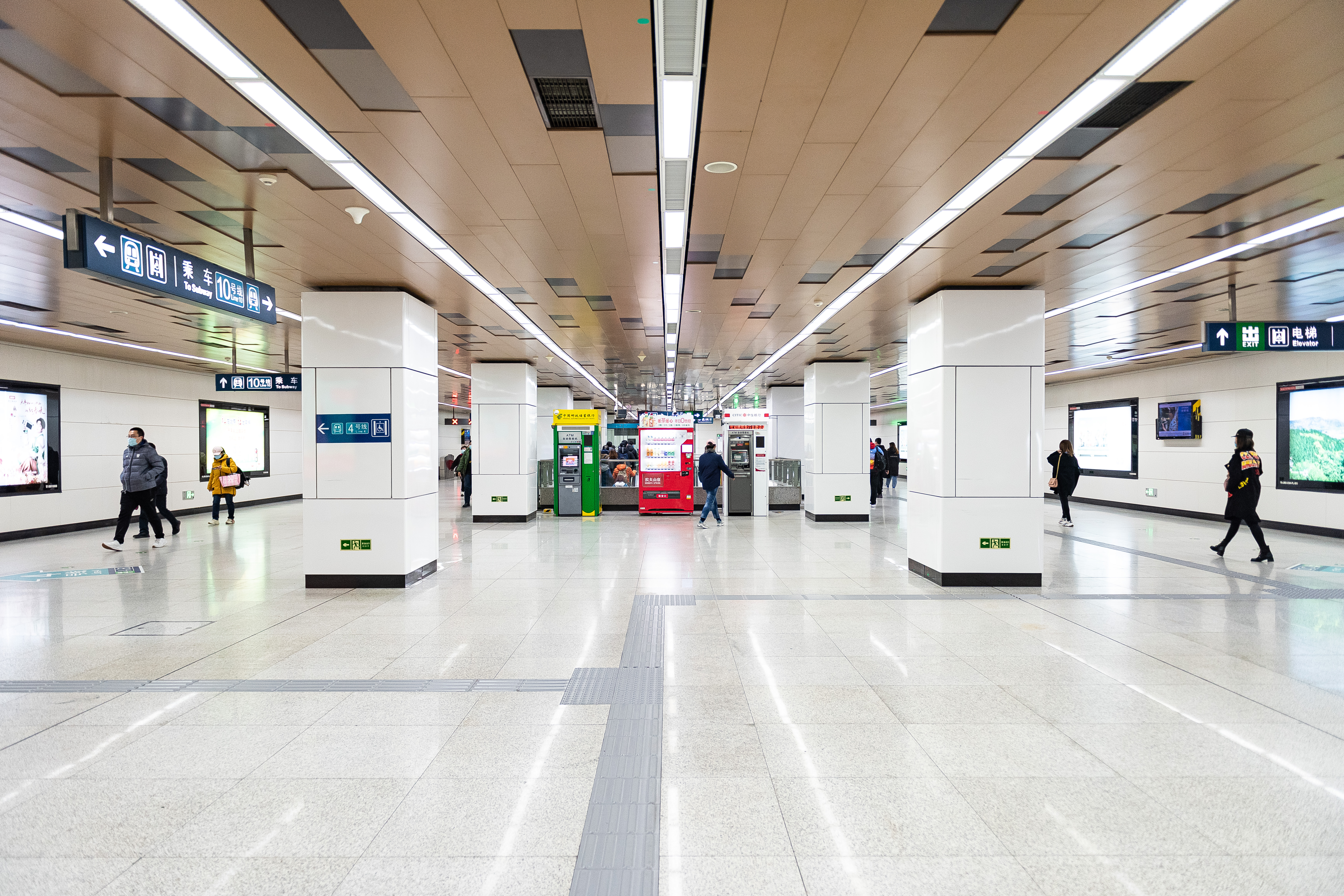
Line 10 east concourse
