= Xizhimen station =

Beijing Subway interchange station

Xizhimen 西直门
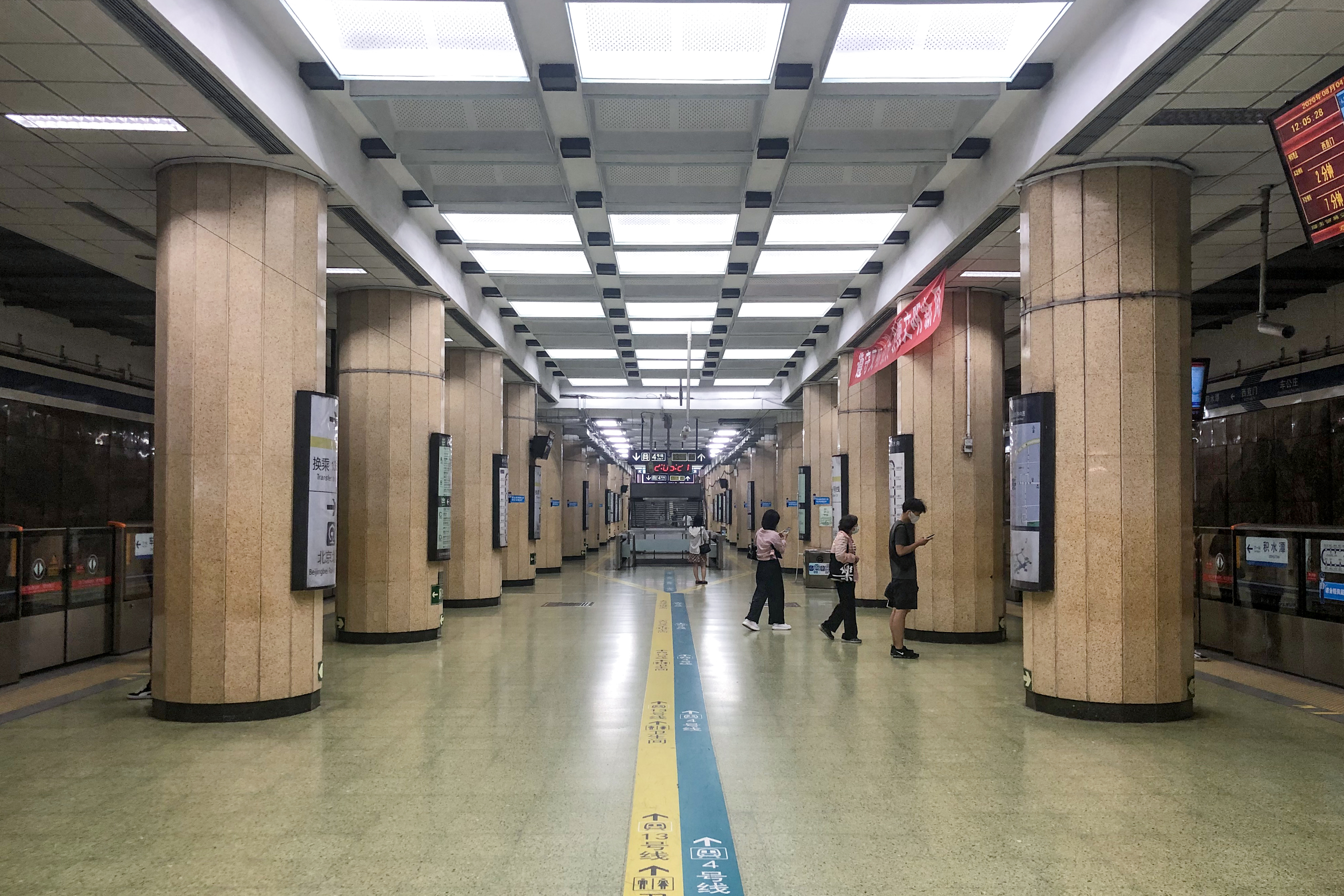
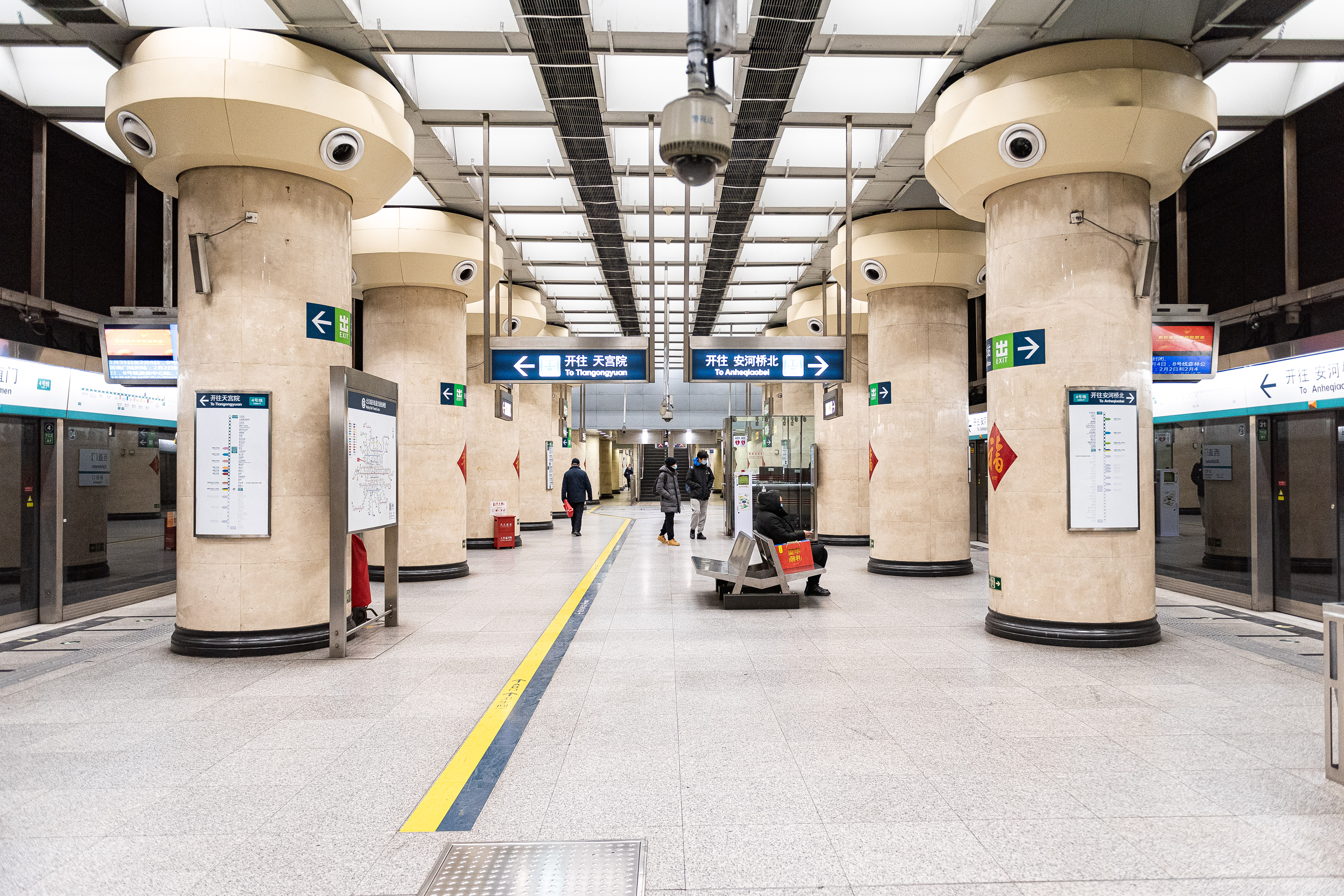
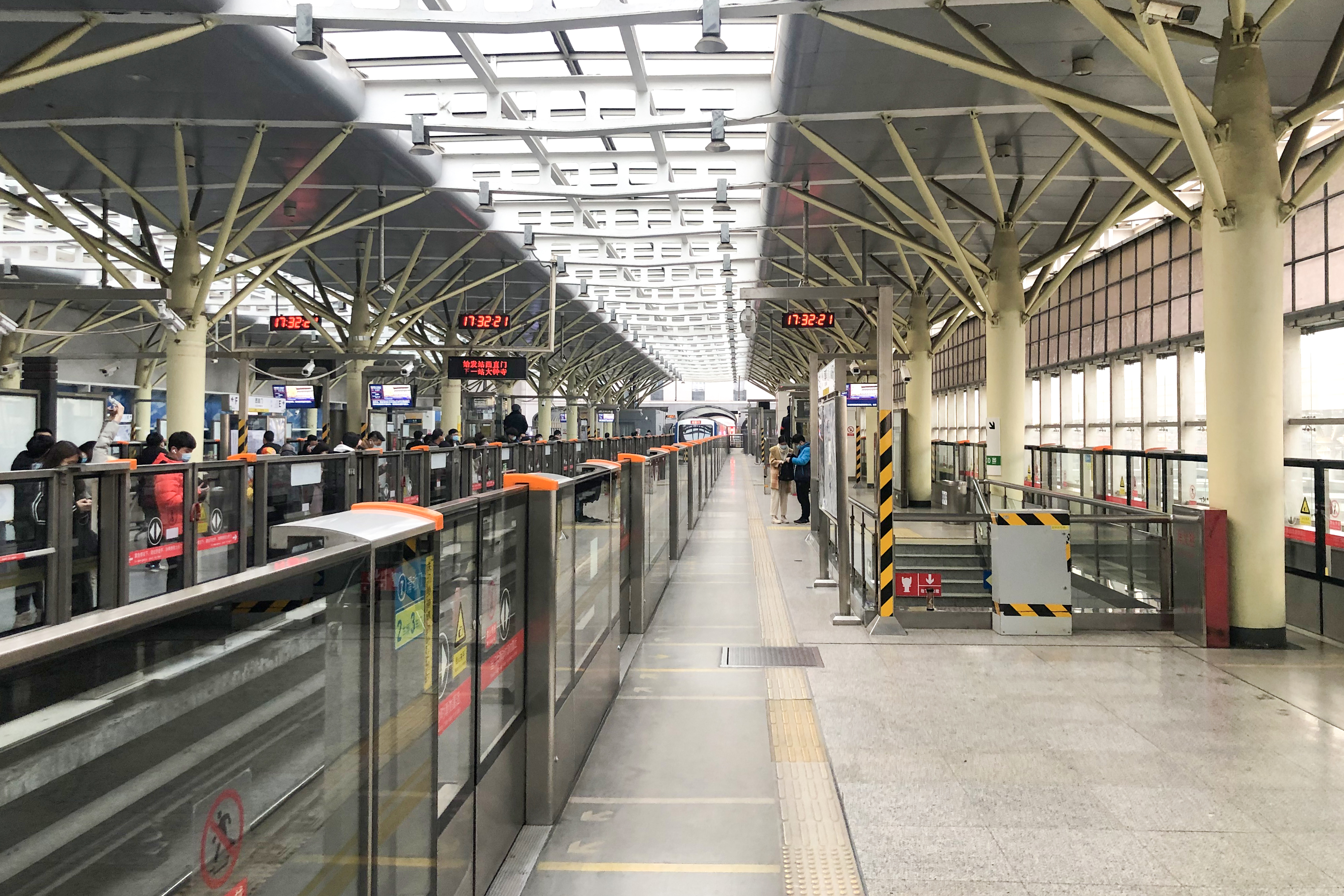
- Line 2 platform Line 4 platform Line 13 platform

General information
- Location: Xizhimen, Xicheng District, Beijing; China
- Coordinates: 39.9405°N 116.355°E
- Operator: Beijing Mass Transit Railway Operation Corp., Ltd (Lines 2 and 13); Beijing MTR Corp. Ltd (Line 4)
- Lines: Line 2; Line 4; Line 13
- Platforms: 8 (2 island platforms (Lines 2 and 4); Spanish solution (Line 13) – island platform and 2 side platforms)
- Tracks: 6
- Connections: Beijingbei railway station

Construction
- Structure type: Underground (Lines 2 and 4); Elevated (Line 13)
- Accessible: Yes

Other information
- Station code: 201 (Line 2); 1301 (line 13)

History
- Opened: September 20, 1984; 41 years ago (Line 2); September 28, 2009; 16 years ago (Line 4); September 28, 2002; 23 years ago (Line 13)

Services
Preceding station	Beijing Subway	Following station
Chegongzhuang outer loop / anticlockwise	Line 2	Jishuitan inner loop / clockwise
Beijing Zoo towards Anheqiaobei	Line 4	Xinjie Kou towards Tiangong Yuan
Terminus	Line 13	Dazhong Si towards Dongzhimen
Location
- Location within Beijing

Xizhimen station (simplified Chinese: 西直门站; traditional Chinese: 西直門站; pinyin: Xīzhímén zhàn) is an interchange station for Line 2, Line 4 and Line 13 of the Beijing Subway. Just outside this station is Beijing North railway station. Line 2 opened on September 20, 1984; Line 13 opened on January 28, 2003; and Line 4 opened on September 28, 2009. With the addition of Line 13 and Line 4, Xizhi Men Station became the second 3-way transfer station (the first was Dongzhimen Station, being the intersection of Line 2, Line 13, and Airport Express). With a peak daily ridership of over 770,000 passengers, Xizhi Men Station is also one of the most crowded stations of the whole Beijing Subway system. It sees over 170,000 transfers per day between the 3 lines serving the station.

== Transfer ==
Lines 2 and 4 are very close together, offering short but potentially crowded transfers. The walk from Lines 2 and 4 to Line 13 is considerably further. The transfer between Lines 2 and 13 once required 15 minutes to complete during rush hours. In 2011, this station was rebuilt to reduce the transfer distance to about 170 m (560 ft) long.

== Station layout ==
Lines 2 and 4 both have underground island platforms. Line 13 has elevated side platforms using the spanish solution.

== Exits ==
There are six exits, lettered A, B, C, D, E, and F. Exits C and F are accessible.

== Gallery ==
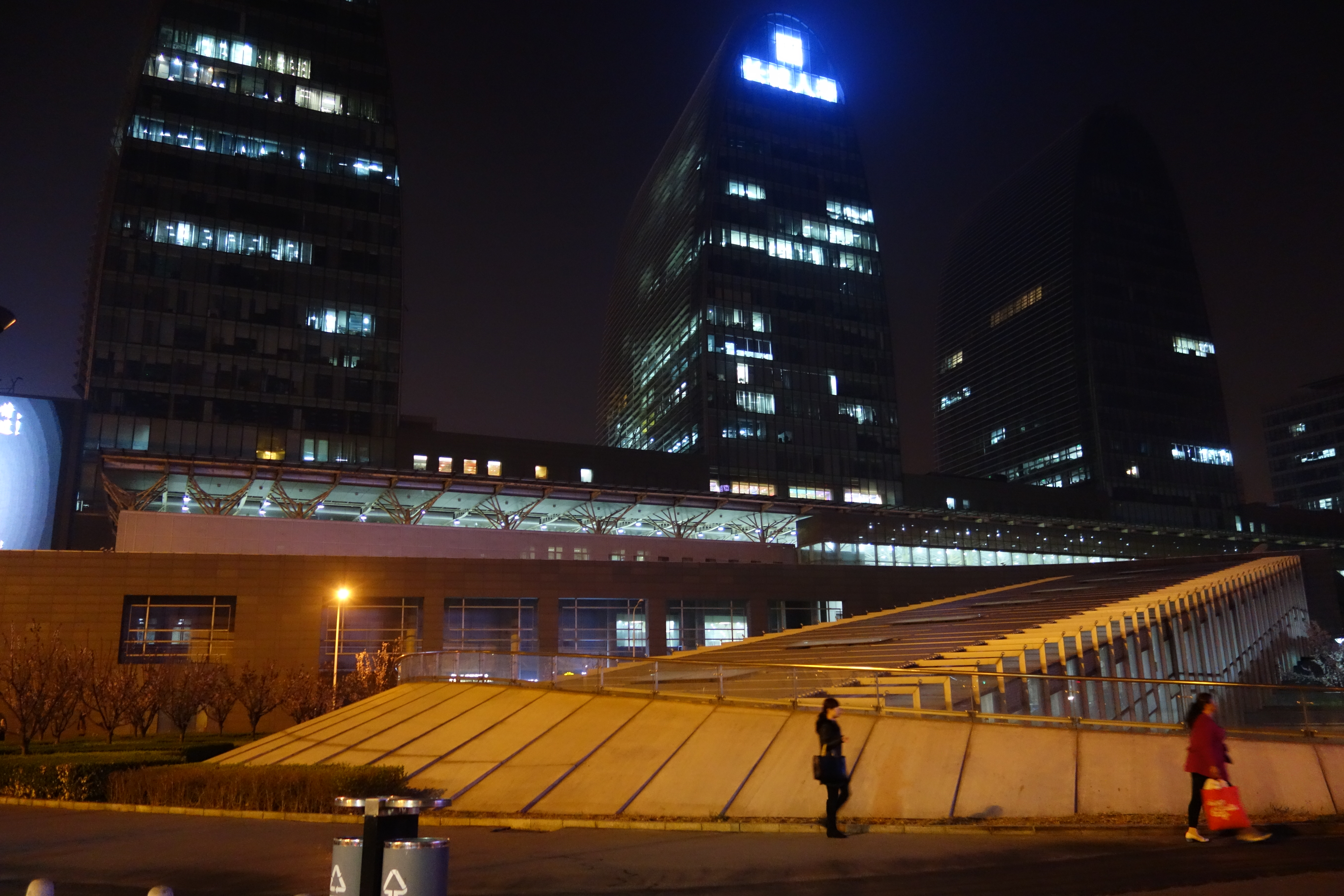
Line 13 station

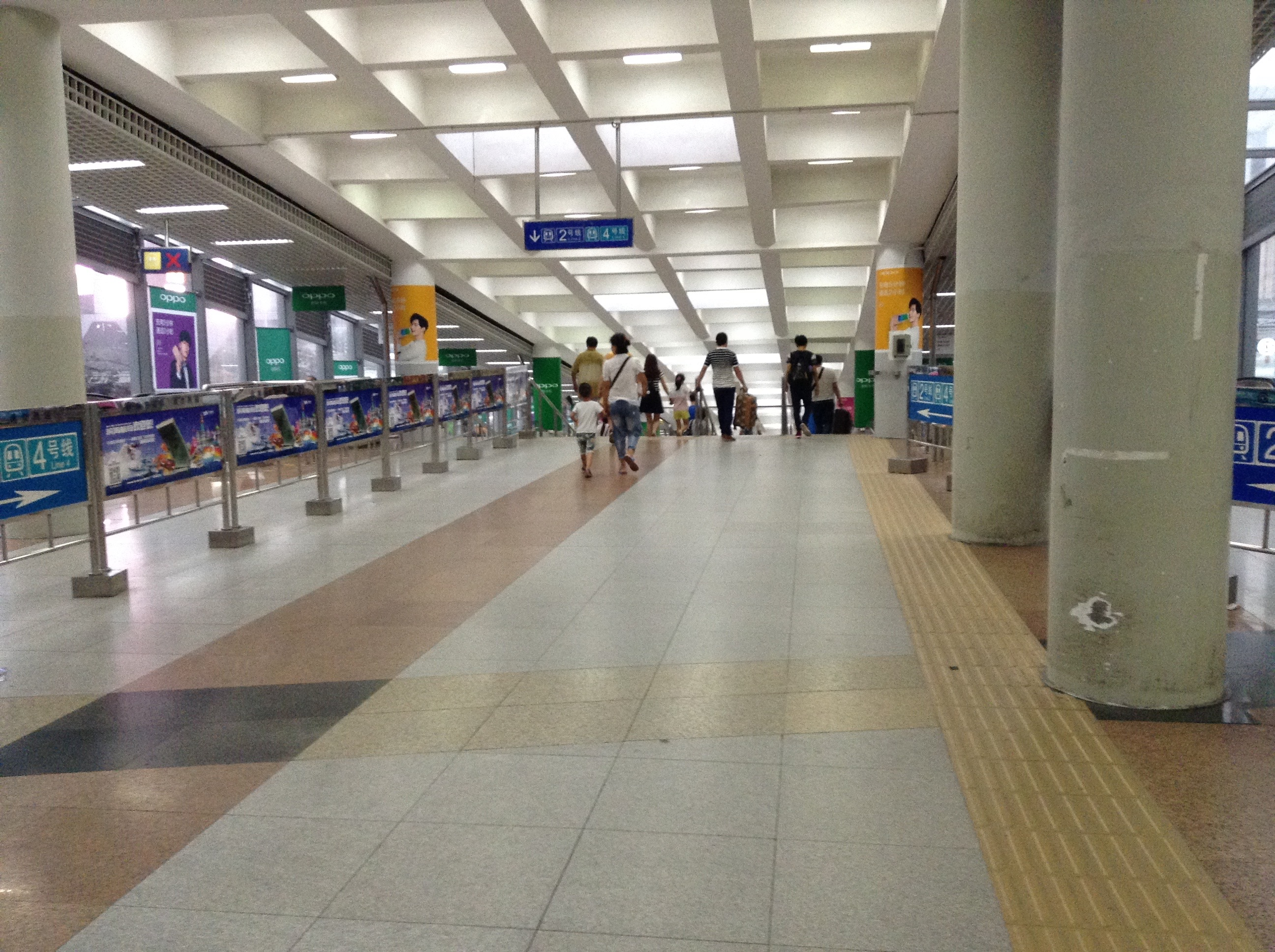
Interchange corridor between lines 2/4 and 13

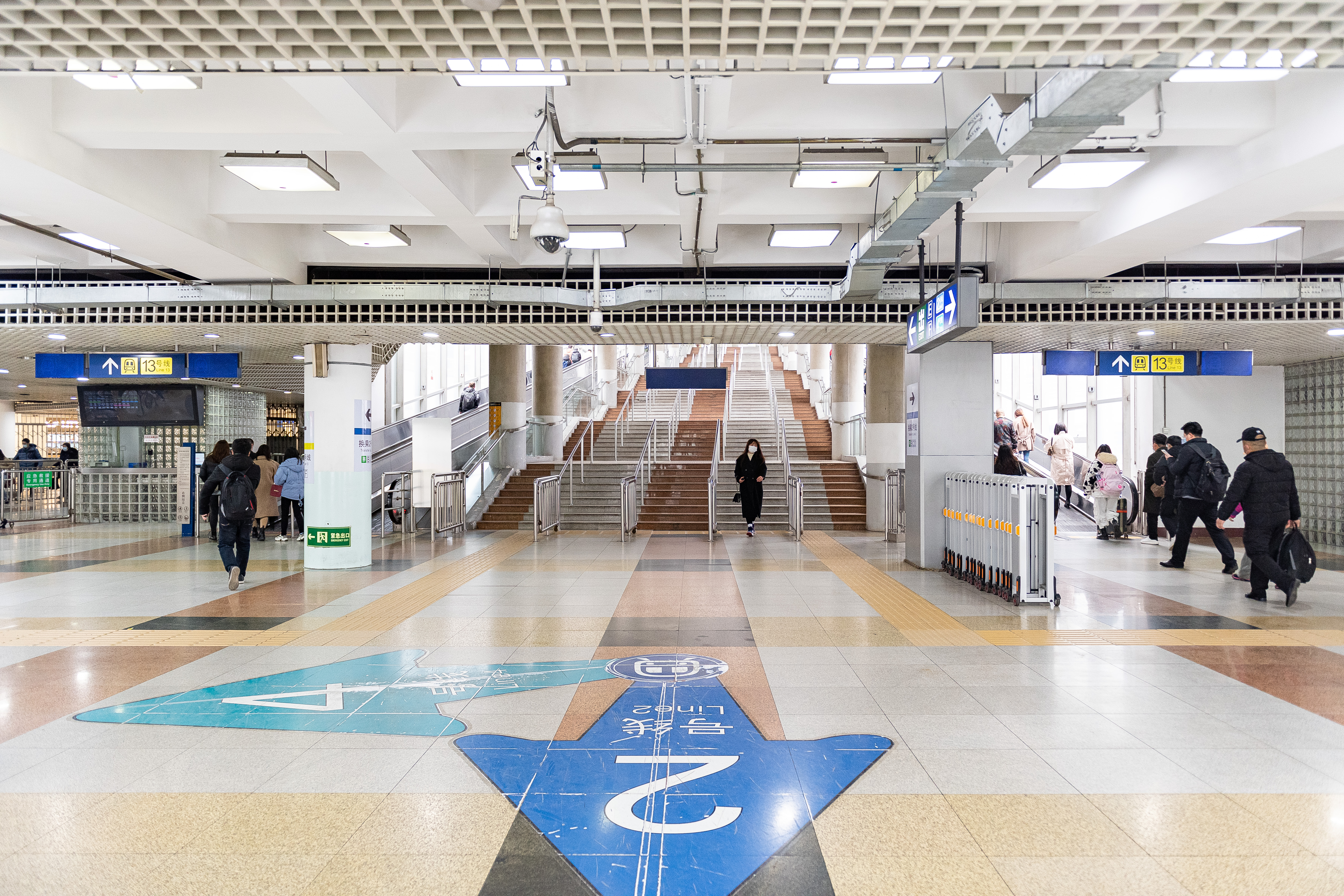
Central interchange hall

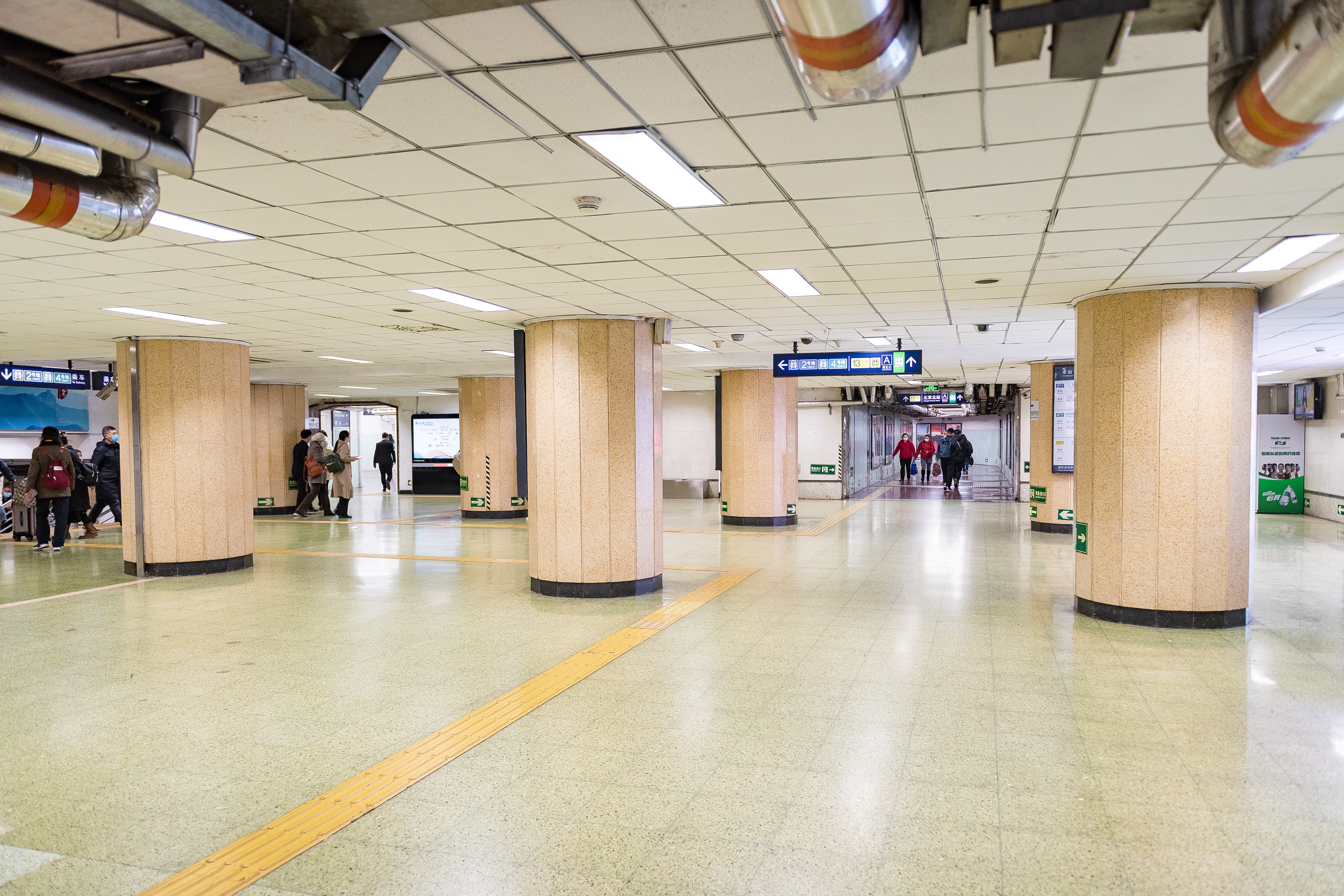
Line 2 north concourse

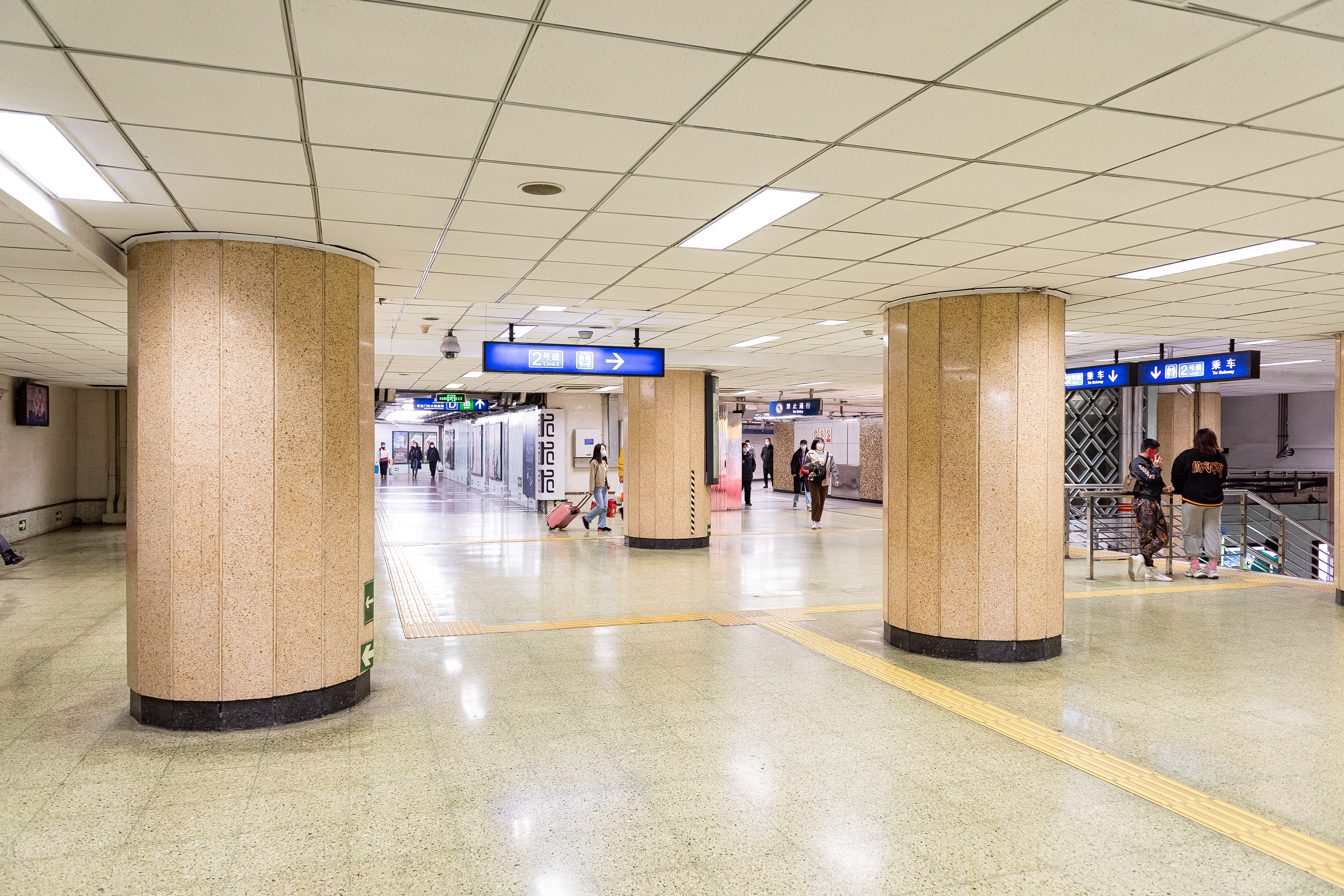
Line 2 south concourse

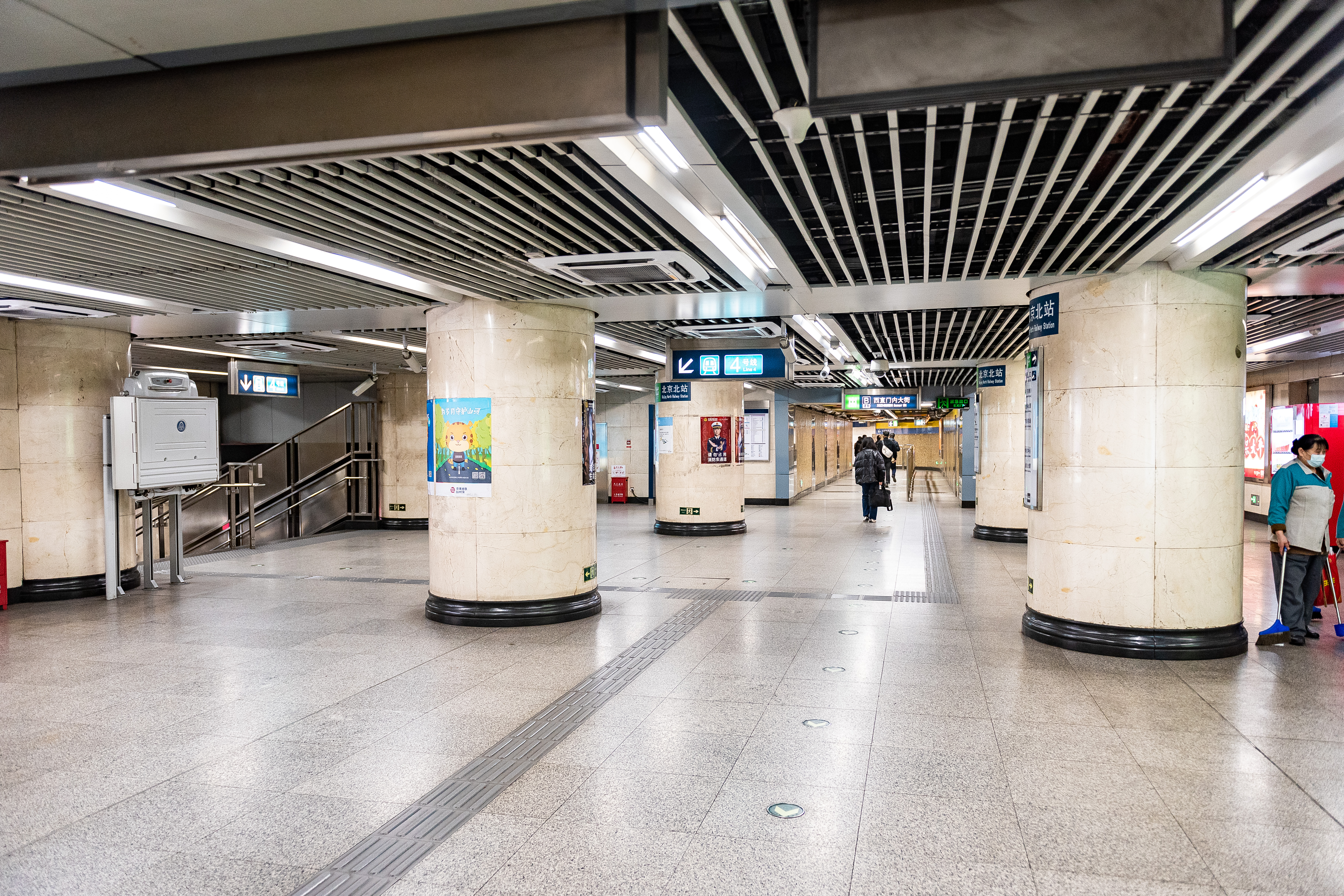
Line 4 east concourse

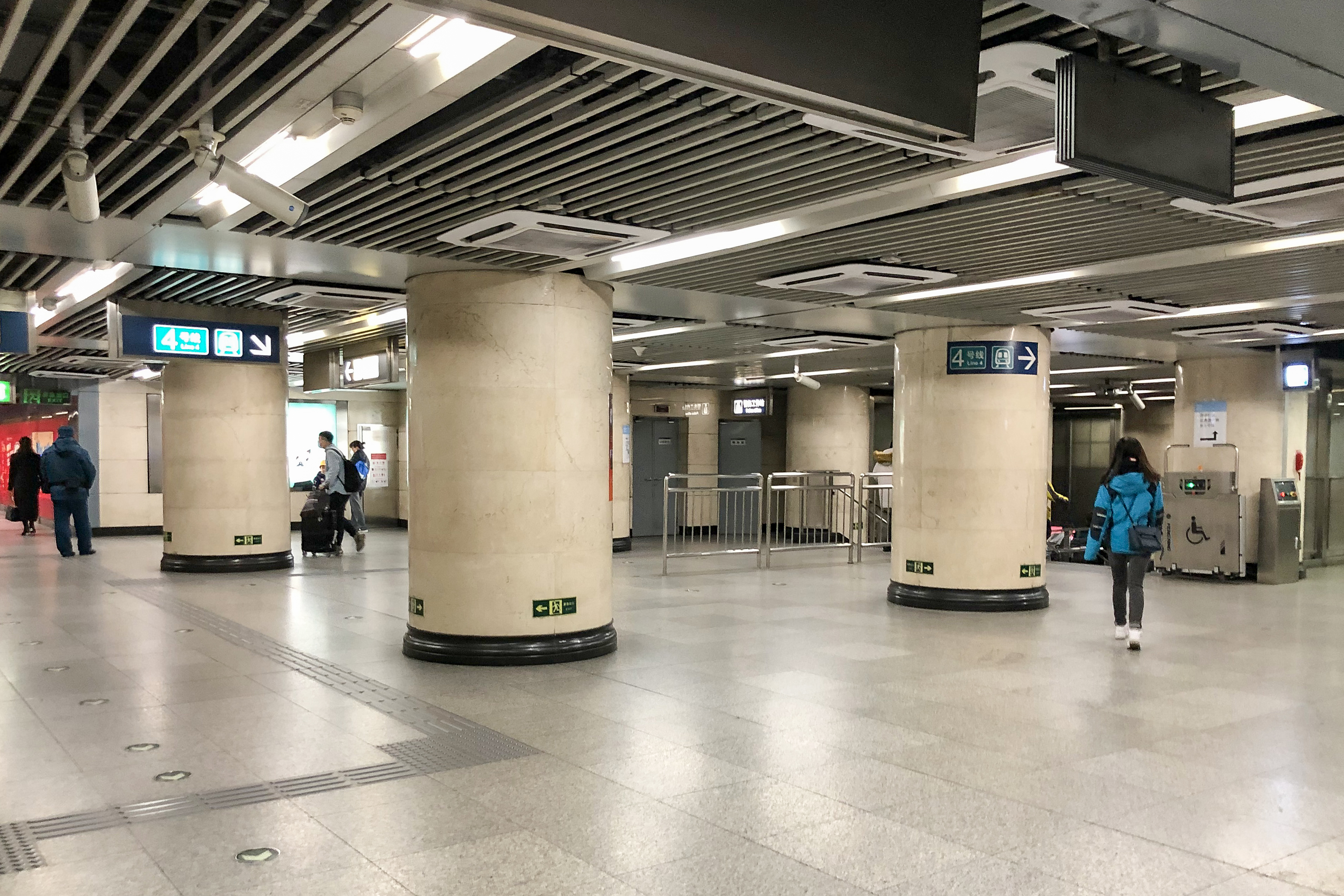
Line 4 west concourse

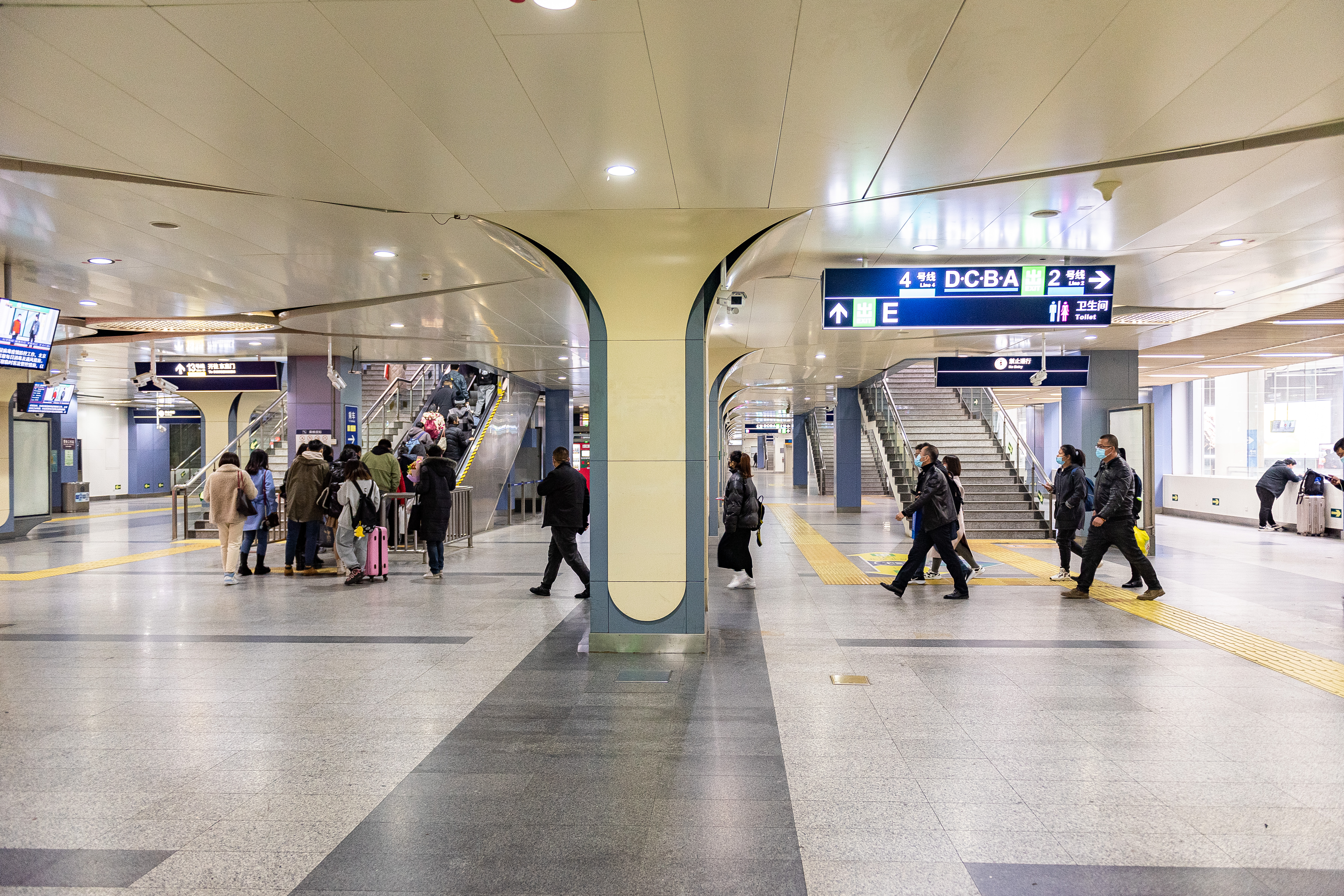
Line 13 concourse
