= Majiapu station =

Beijing Subway station

Coordinates: 39.8532°N 116.3714°E

Majiapu 马家堡
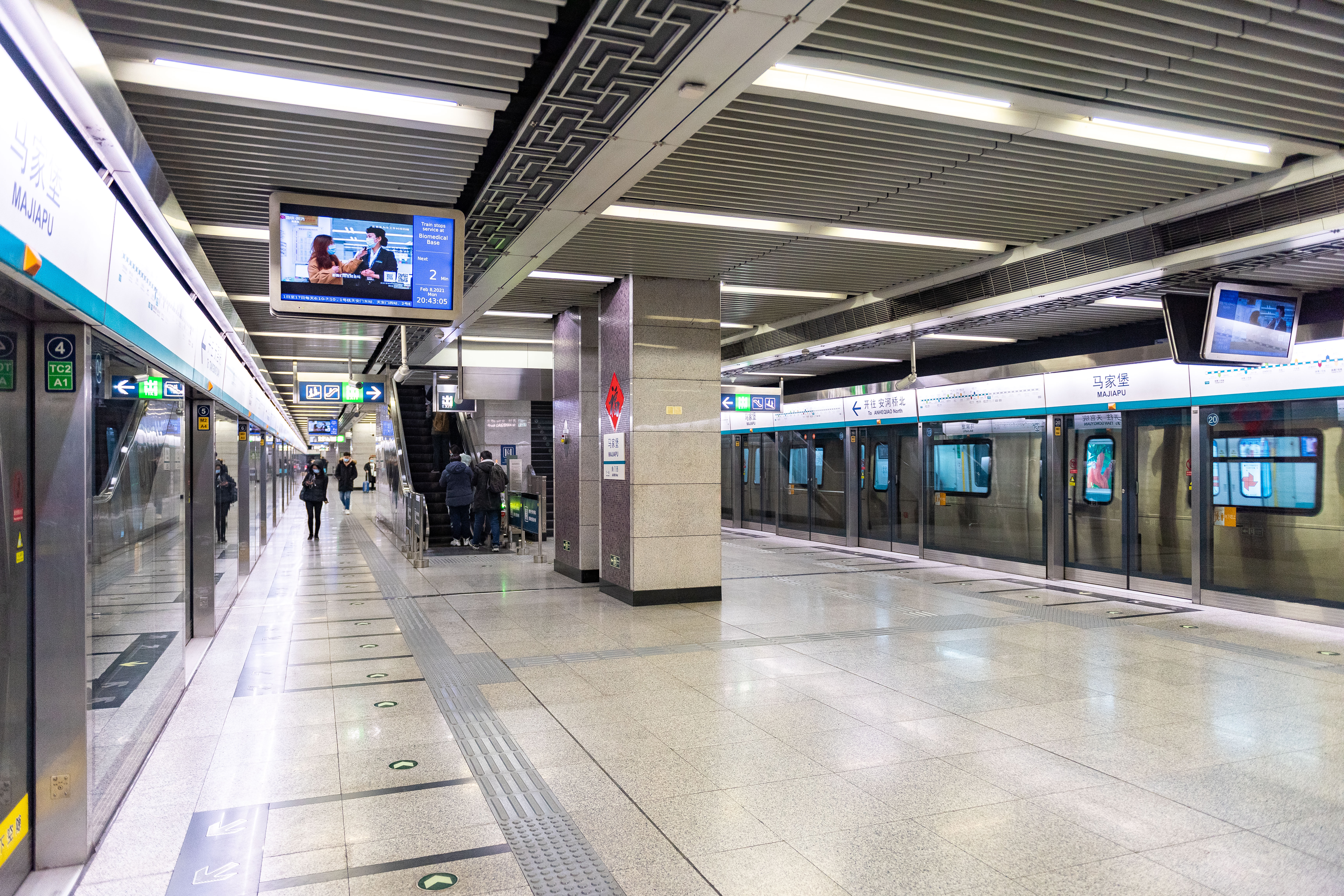
- Platform

General information
- Location: West Majiapu Road south of the South 3rd Ring Road; Fengtai District, Beijing; China
- Operator: Beijing MTR Corporation Limited
- Line: Line 4
- Platforms: 2 (1 island platform)
- Tracks: 2

Construction
- Structure type: Underground
- Accessible: Yes

History
- Opened: September 28, 2009

Services
Preceding station	Beijing Subway	Following station
Beijing South railway station towards Anheqiaobei	Line 4	Jiaomenxi towards Tiangong Yuan
Location
- Location within Beijing

Majiapu (simplified Chinese: 马家堡站; traditional Chinese: 馬家堡站; pinyin: Mǎjiāpù Zhàn) is a station on Line 4 of the Beijing Subway.

== Station layout ==
The station has an underground island platform.

== Exits ==
There are 3 exits, lettered A, B, and C. Exit A is accessible.
