= Chegongzhuang station =

Beijing Subway interchange station

Chegongzhuang 车公庄
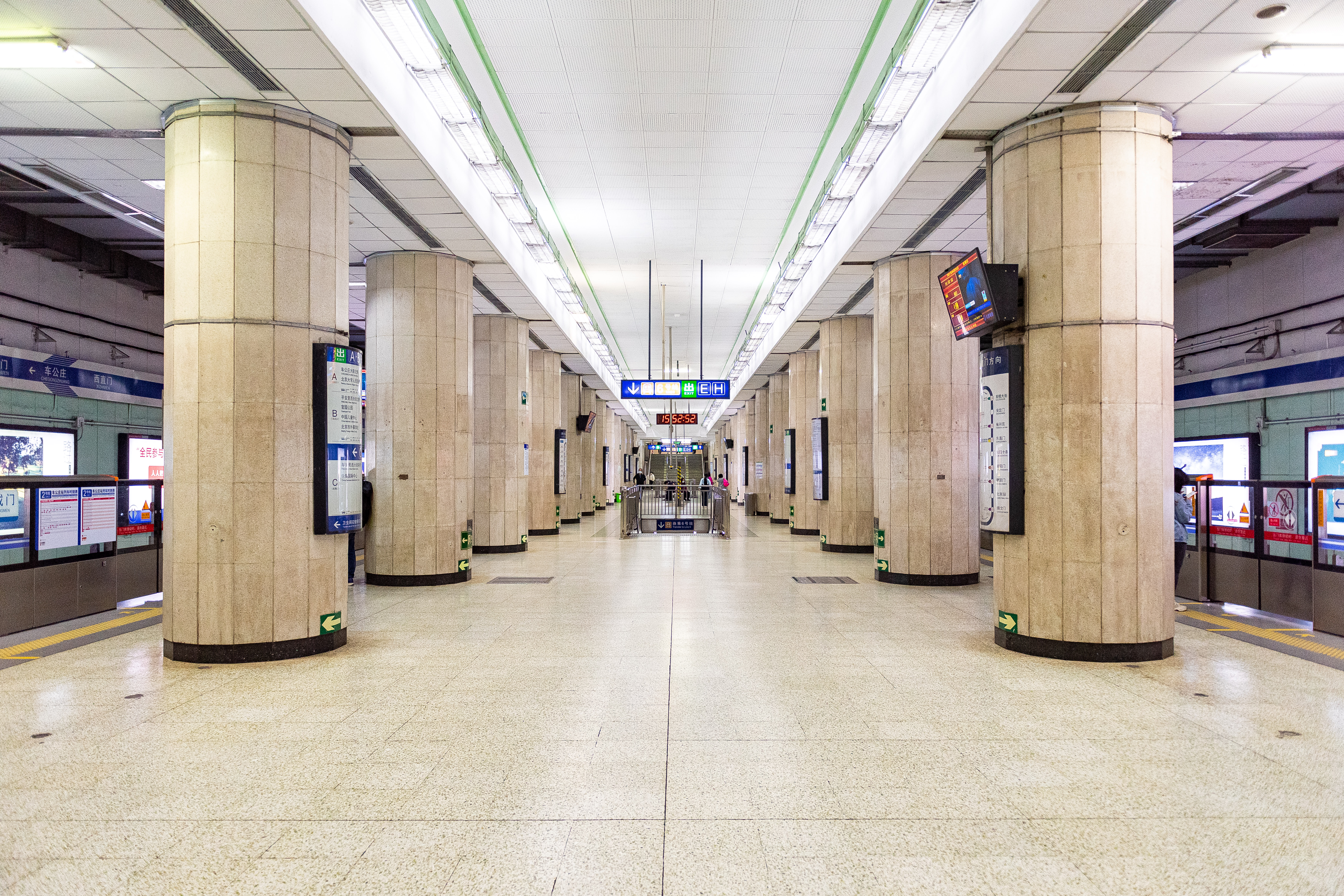
- Line 2 platform

General information
- Location: West 2nd Ring Road and Chegongzhuang Street (车公庄大街) / Ping'anli West Street (平安里西大街); Chegongzhuang, Xicheng District, Beijing; China
- Coordinates: 39°55′56.45″N 116°21′20.62″E
- Operator: Beijing Mass Transit Railway Operation Corporation Limited
- Lines: Line 2; Line 6
- Platforms: 4 (1 split island platform and 1 island platform)
- Tracks: 4

Construction
- Structure type: Underground
- Accessible: Yes

Other information
- Station code: 202 (line 2)

History
- Opened: September 20, 1984; 41 years ago (line 2); December 30, 2012; 13 years ago (line 6)

Services
Preceding station	Beijing Subway	Following station
Fuchengmen outer loop / anticlockwise	Line 2	Xizhimen inner loop / clockwise
Chegongzhuangxi towards Jin'anqiao	Line 6	Ping'anli towards Luyang
Location
- Location within Beijing

Chegongzhuang station (simplified Chinese: 车公庄站; traditional Chinese: 車公莊站; pinyin: Chēgōngzhuāng Zhàn) is an interchange station on Line 2 and Line 6 of the Beijing Subway. The station is on intersection of Chegongzhuang Street and the West 2nd Ring Road. It provides direct access to Guanyuan Park.

== Station layout ==
Both the line 2 and 6 stations have underground island platforms. Line 6 has a split island platform, whilst line 2 has a normal island platform.

== Exits ==
There are 5 exits, lettered A, B, C, E, and H. Exits C and H are accessible.

== Future Development ==
It will be the Southern terminus of Line 13A. Construction of Chegongzhuang station on Line 13A started on 20 April 2024.

== Gallery ==
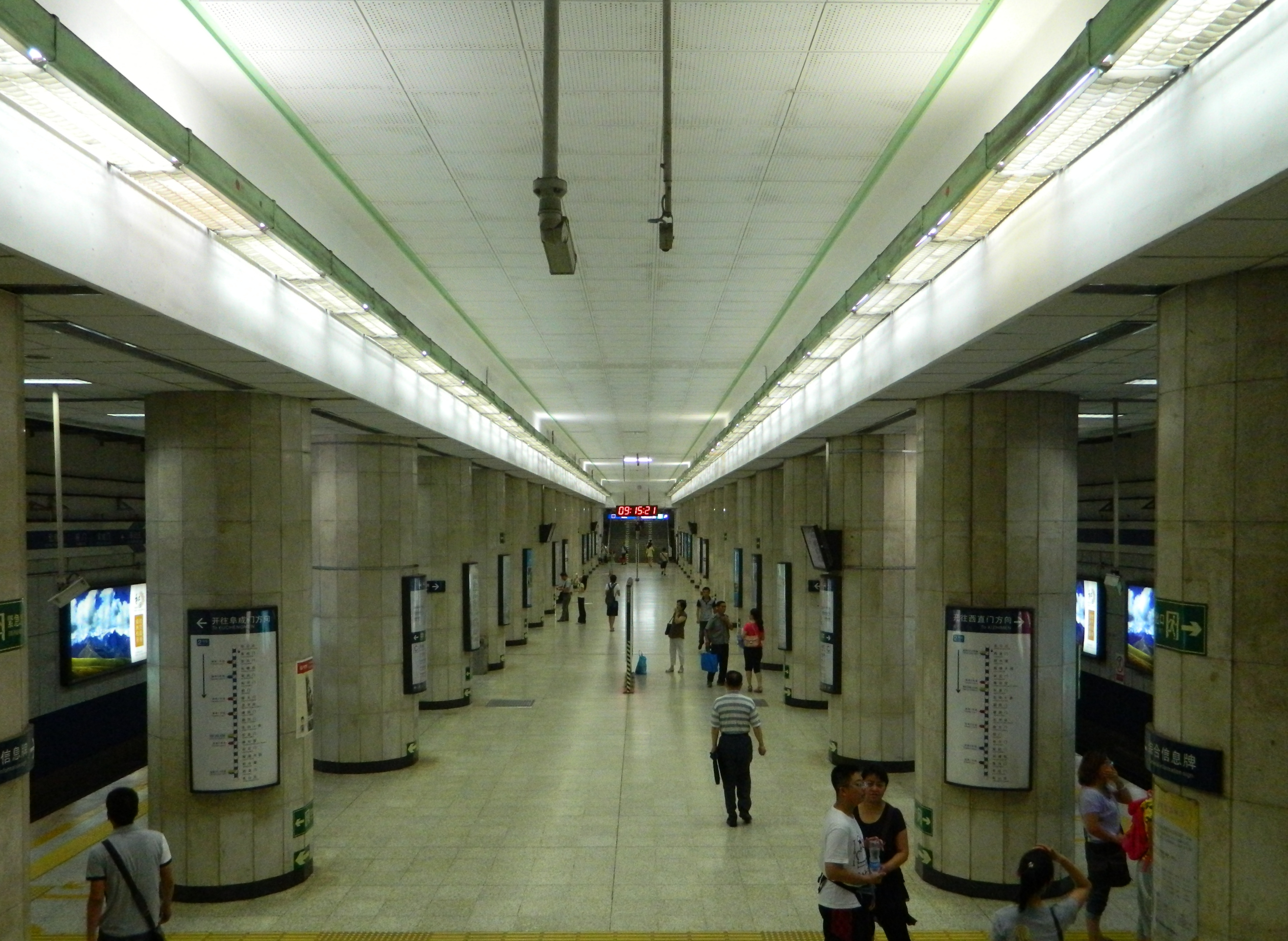
Line 2 platform

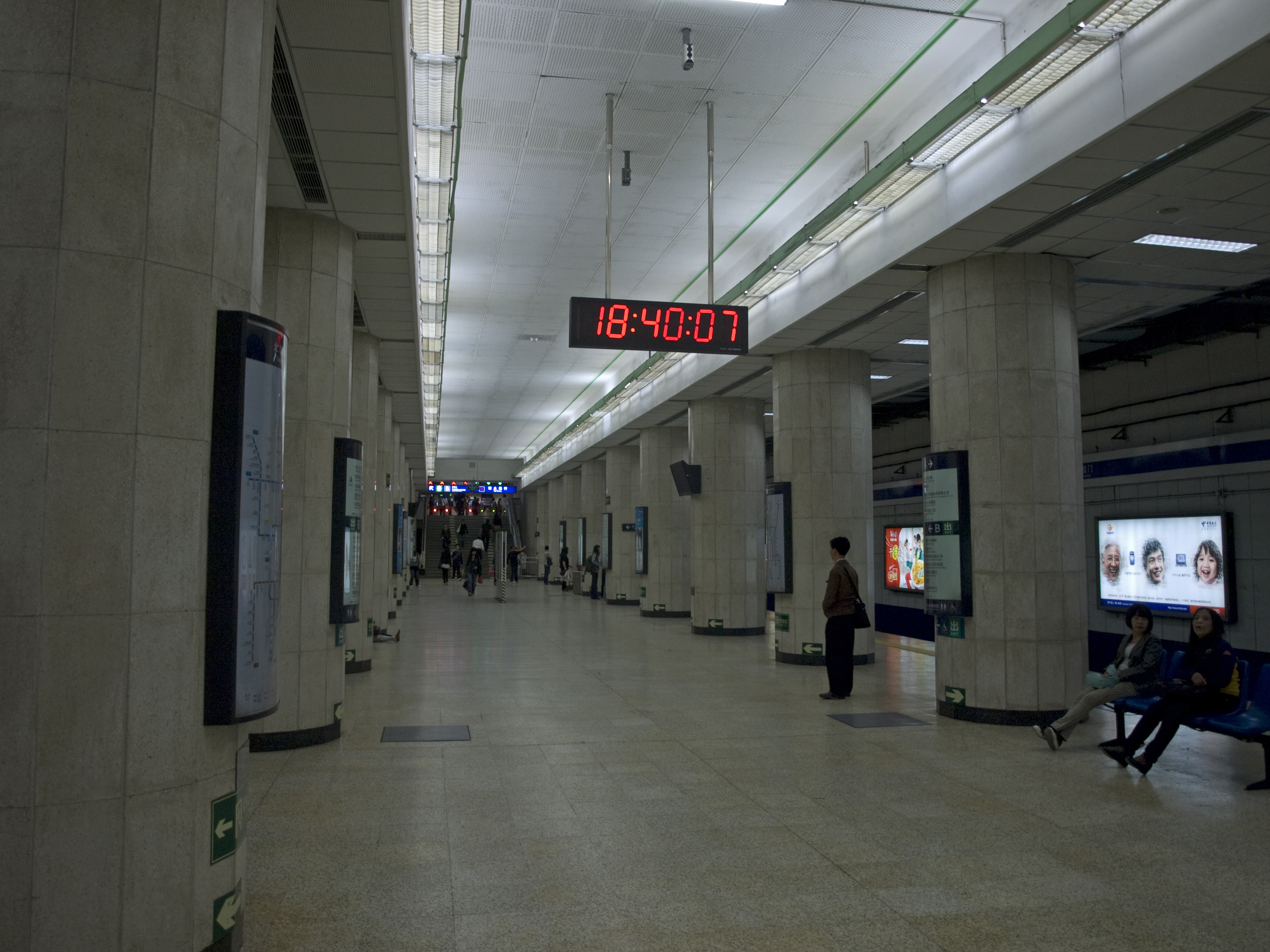
Line 2 platform in May 2010

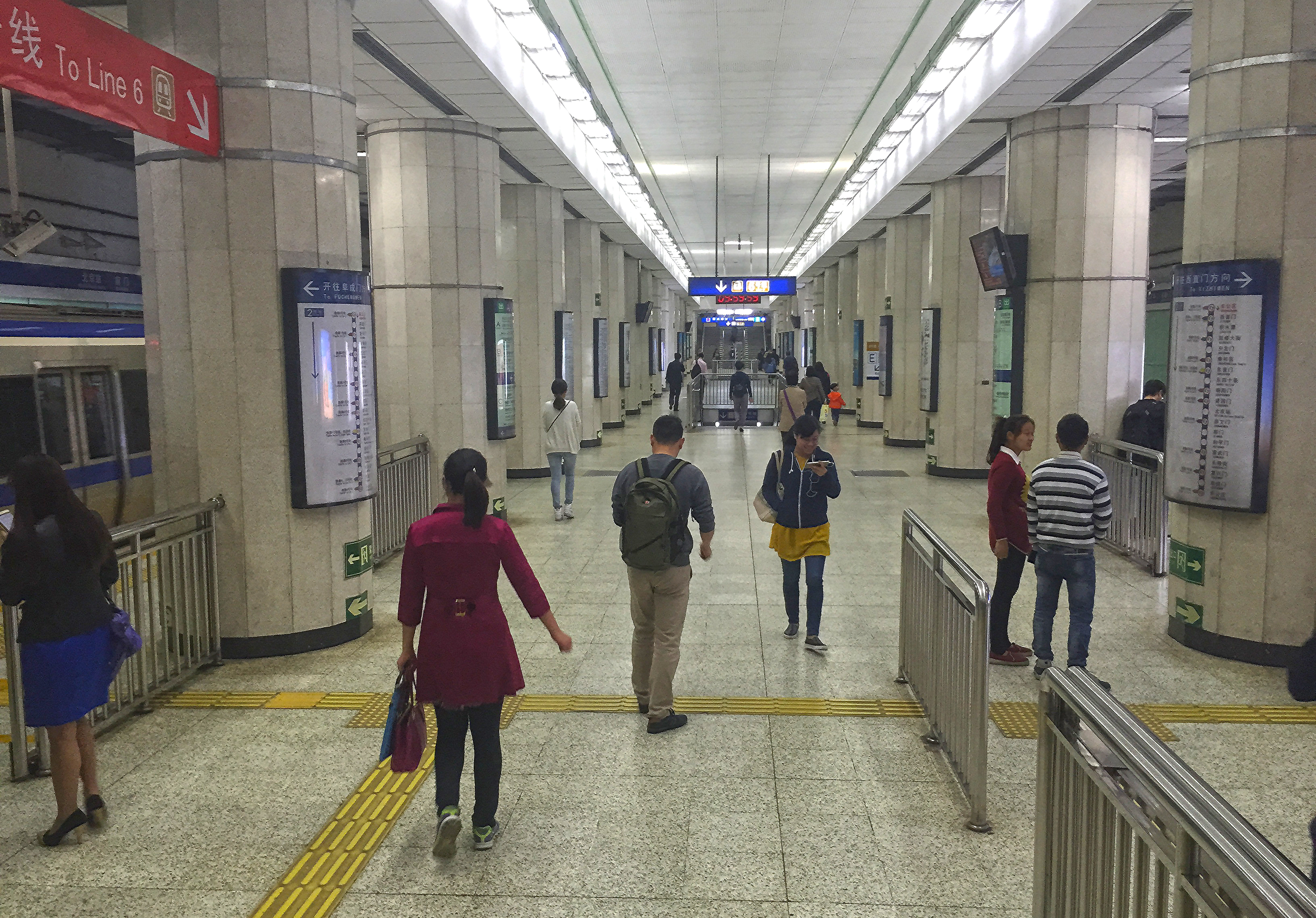
Line 2 platform

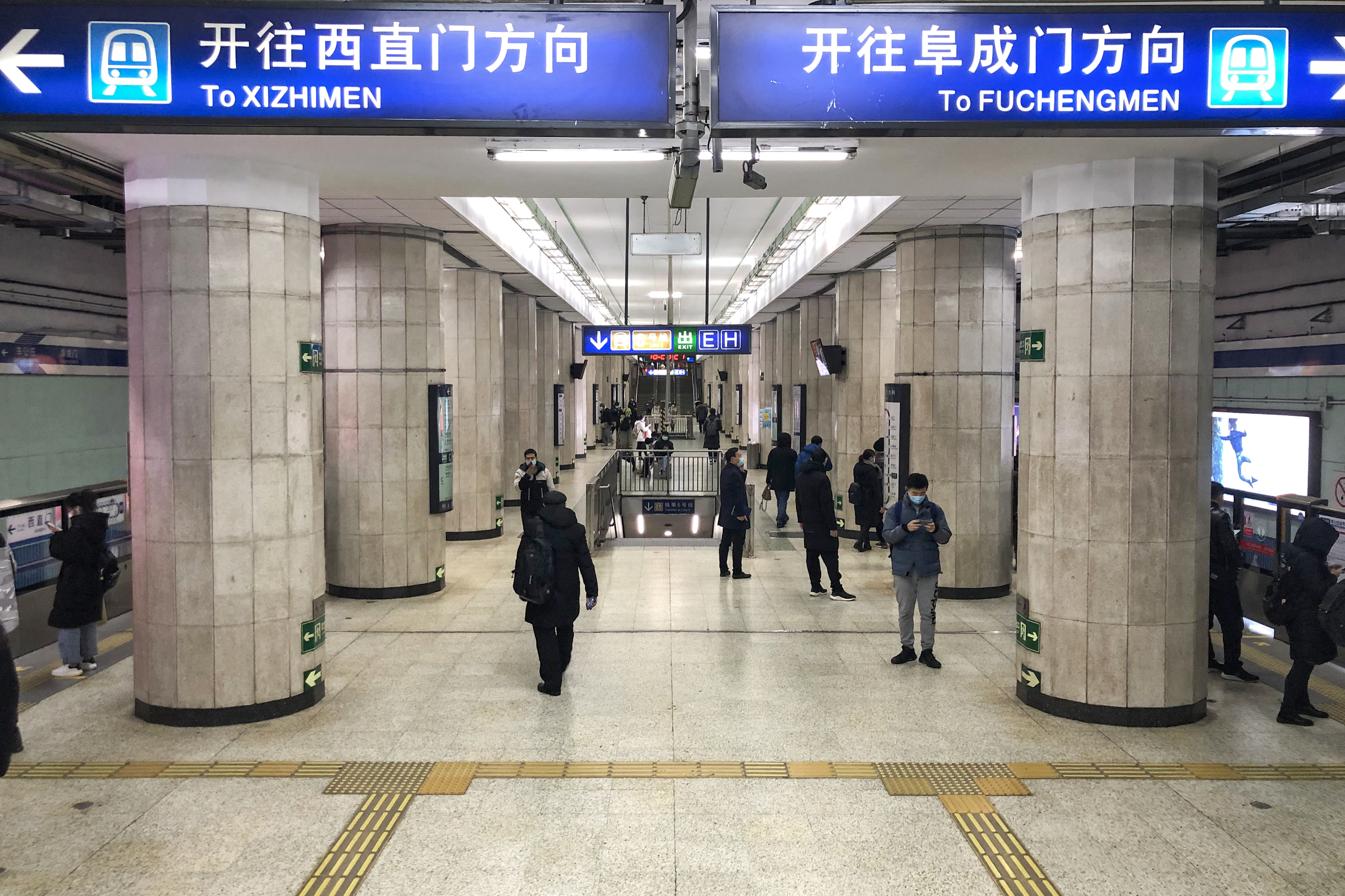
Line 2 platform in December 2020

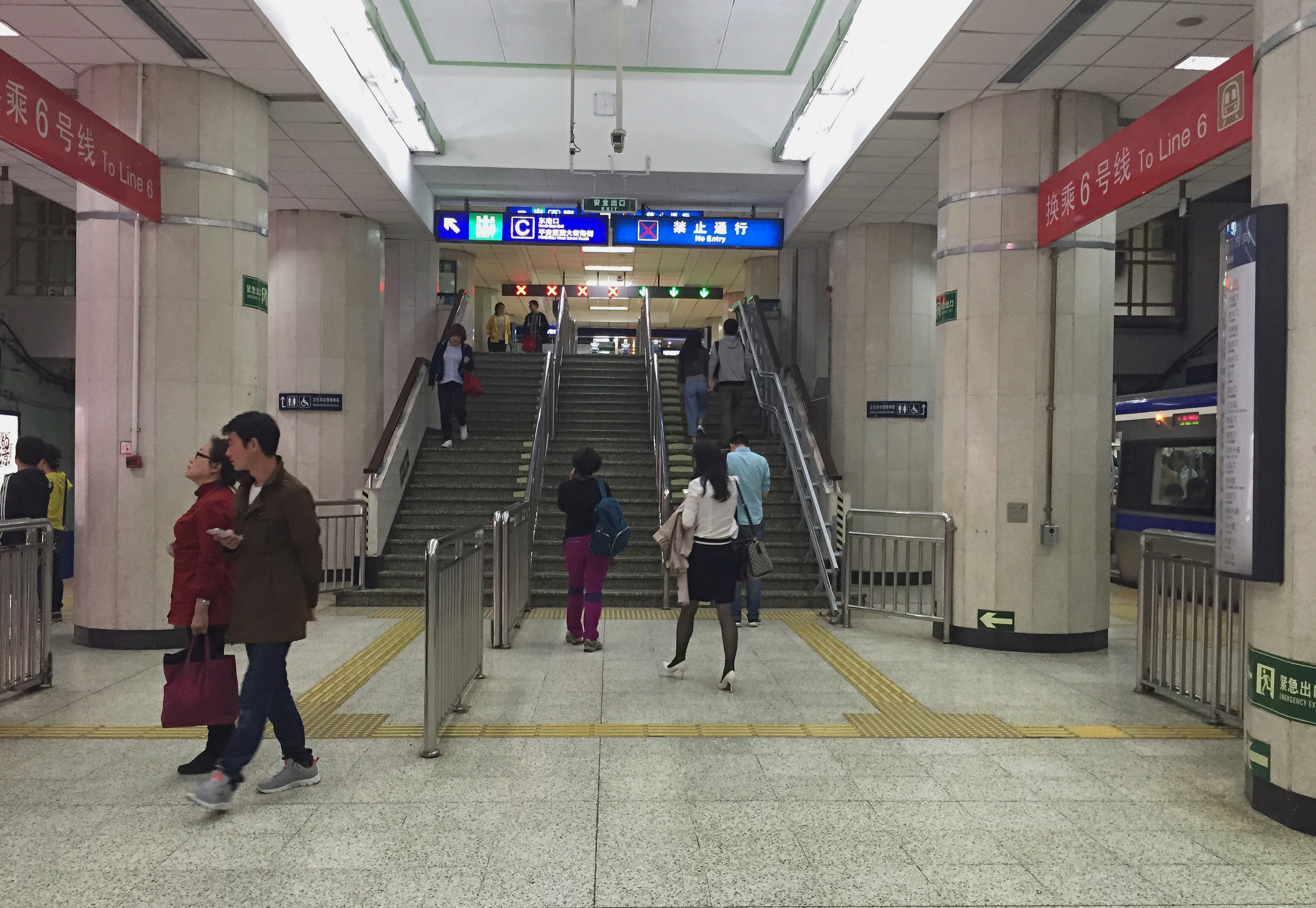
Stairs to exit C

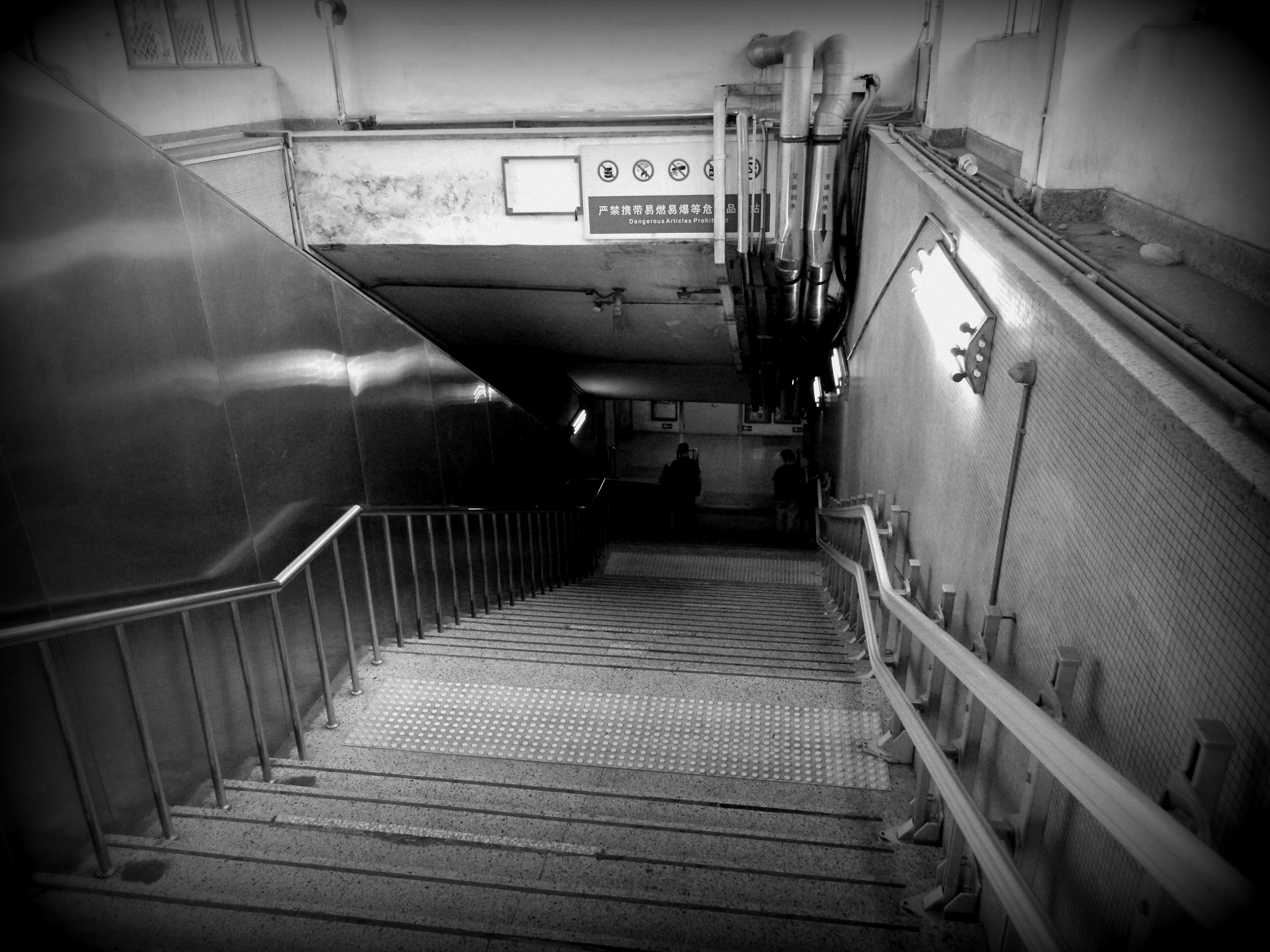
Line 2 exit

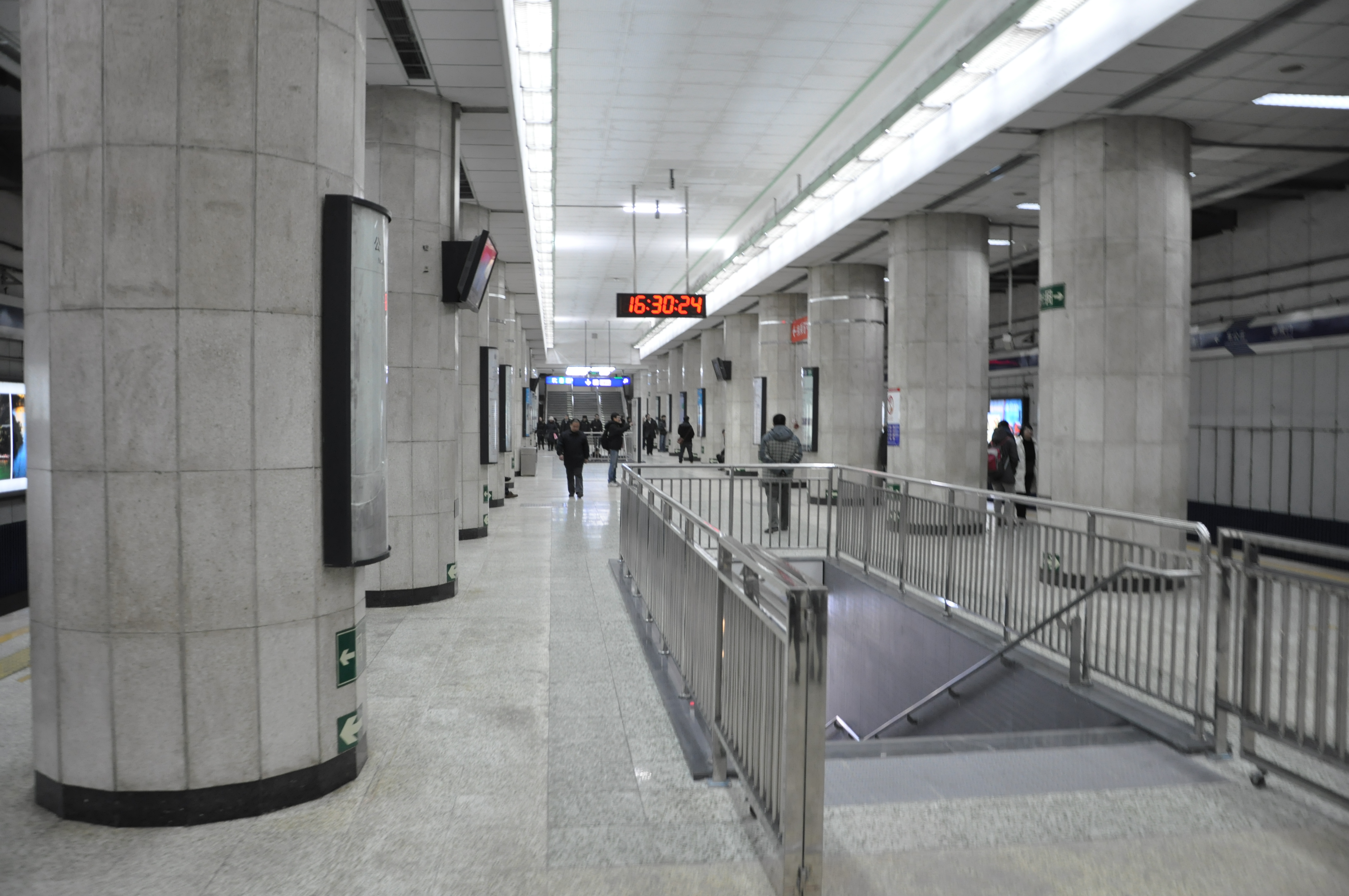

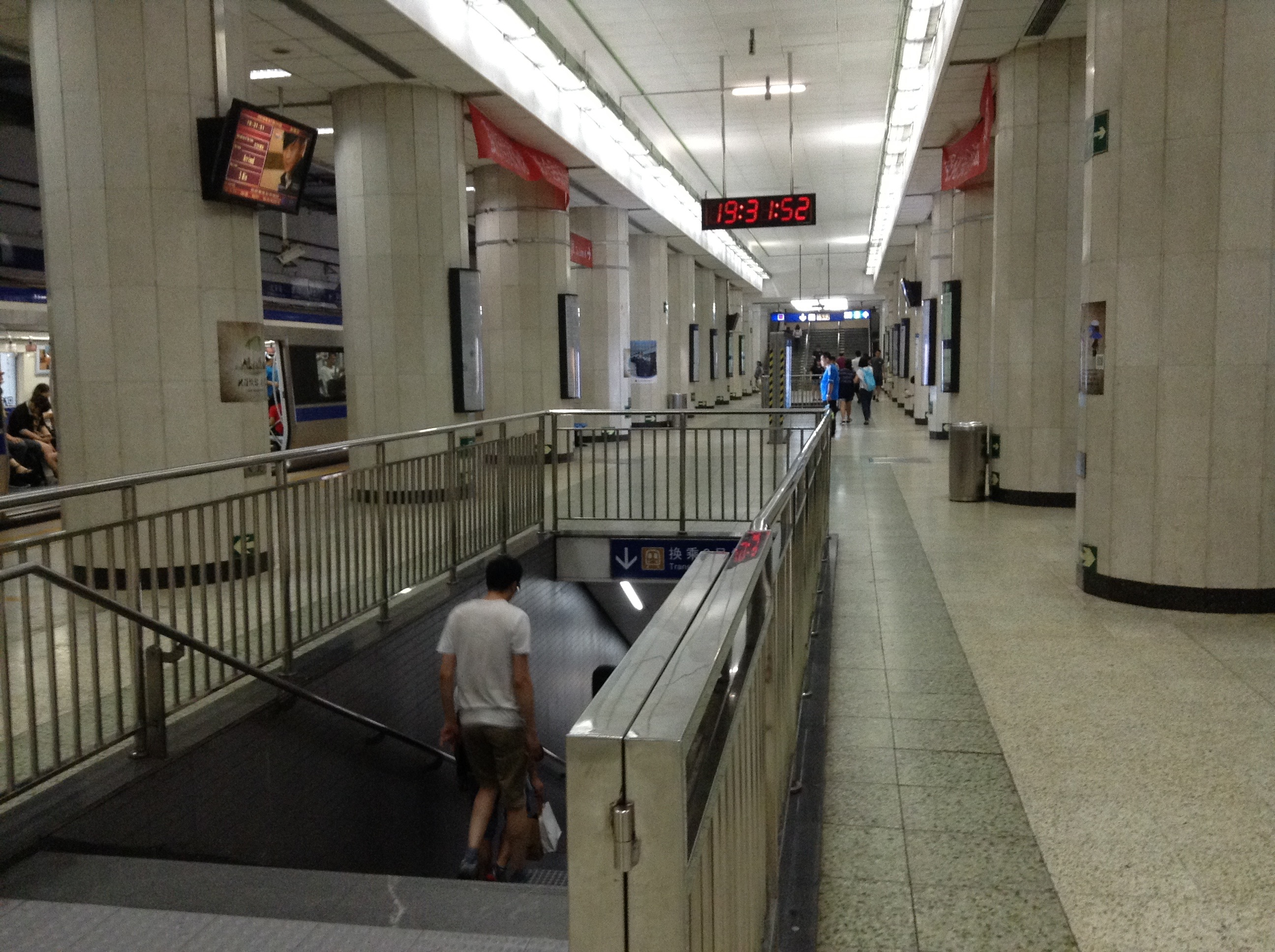

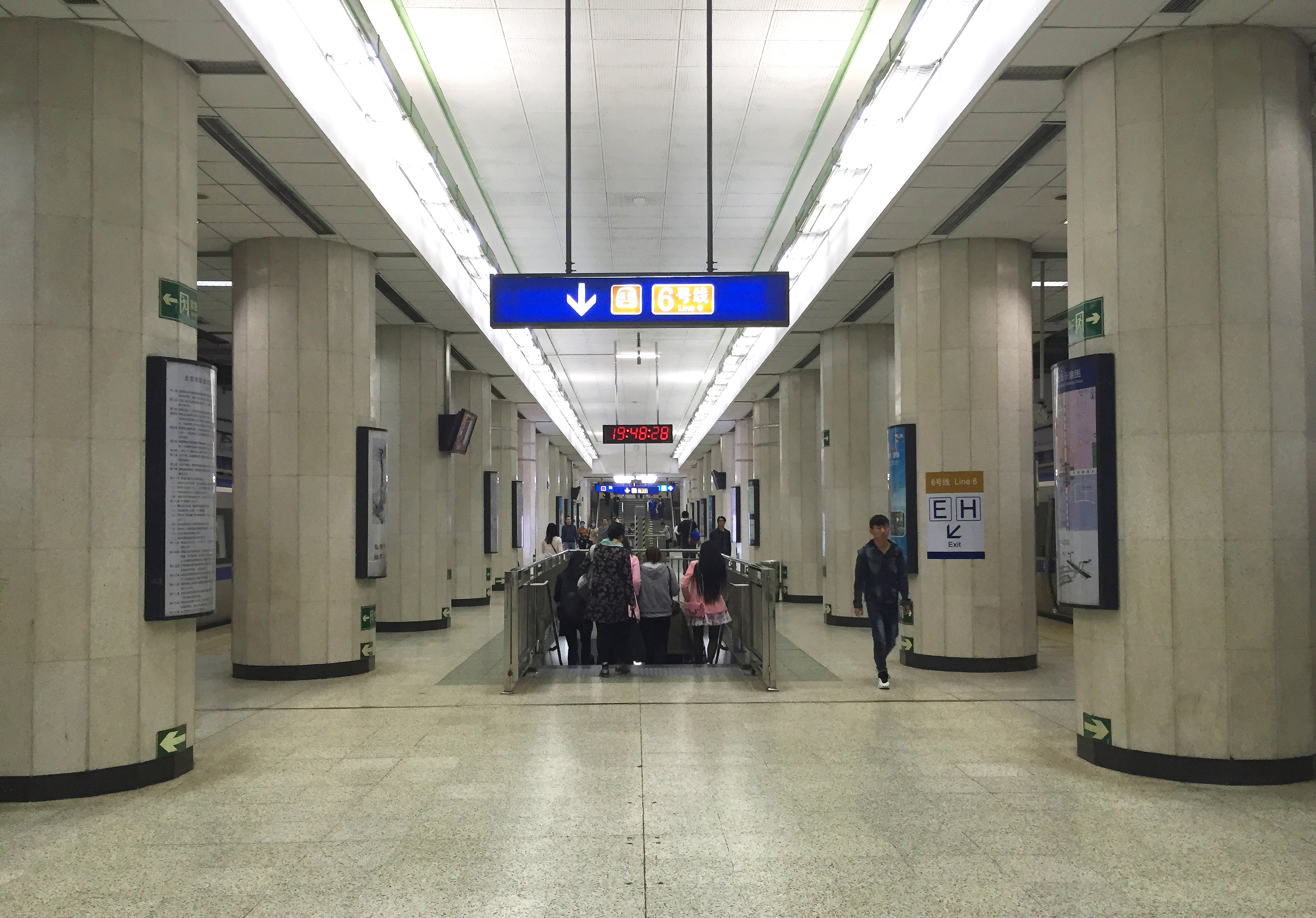
Interchange to Line 6.

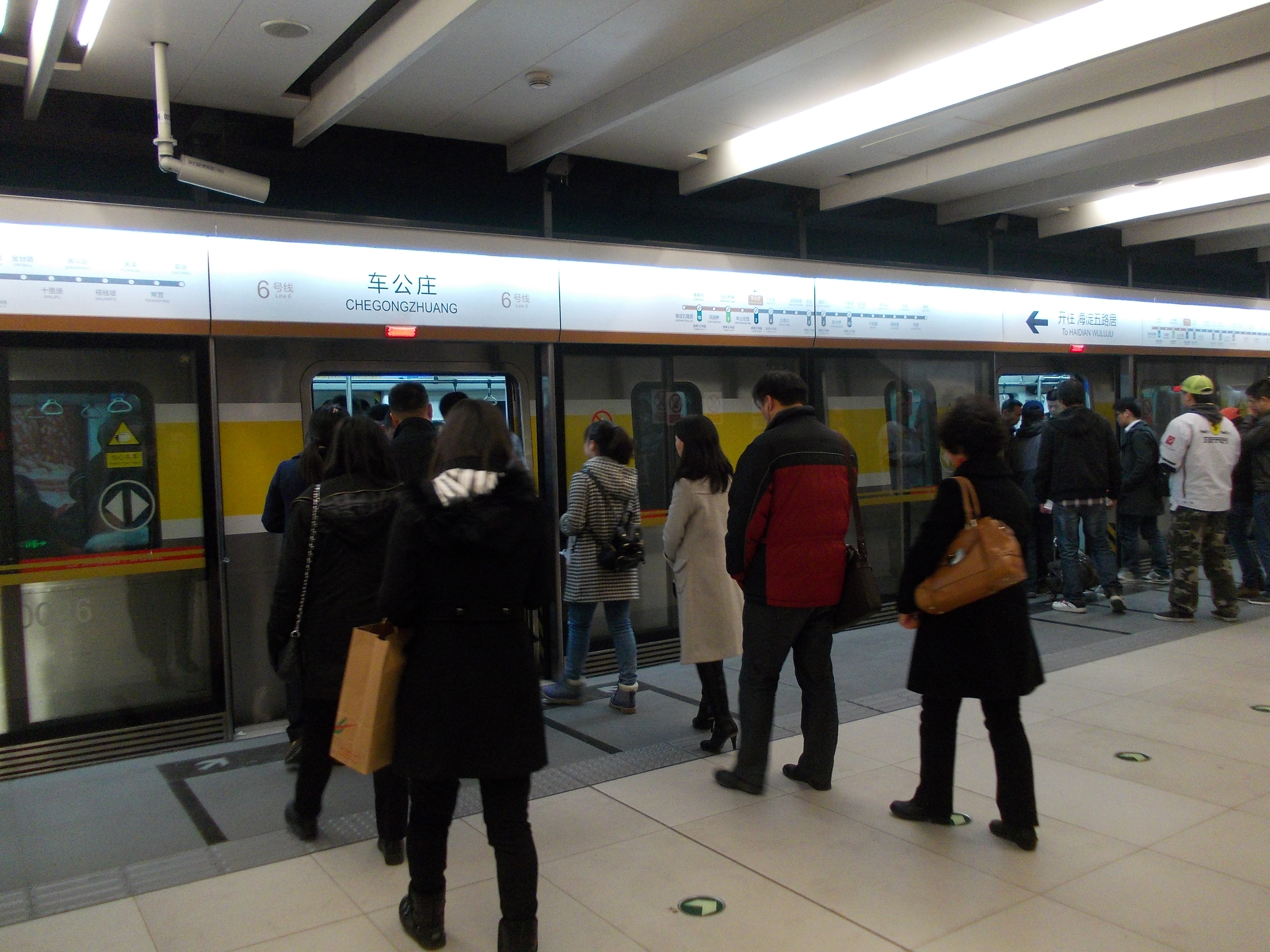
Passengers boarding a westbound line 6 train

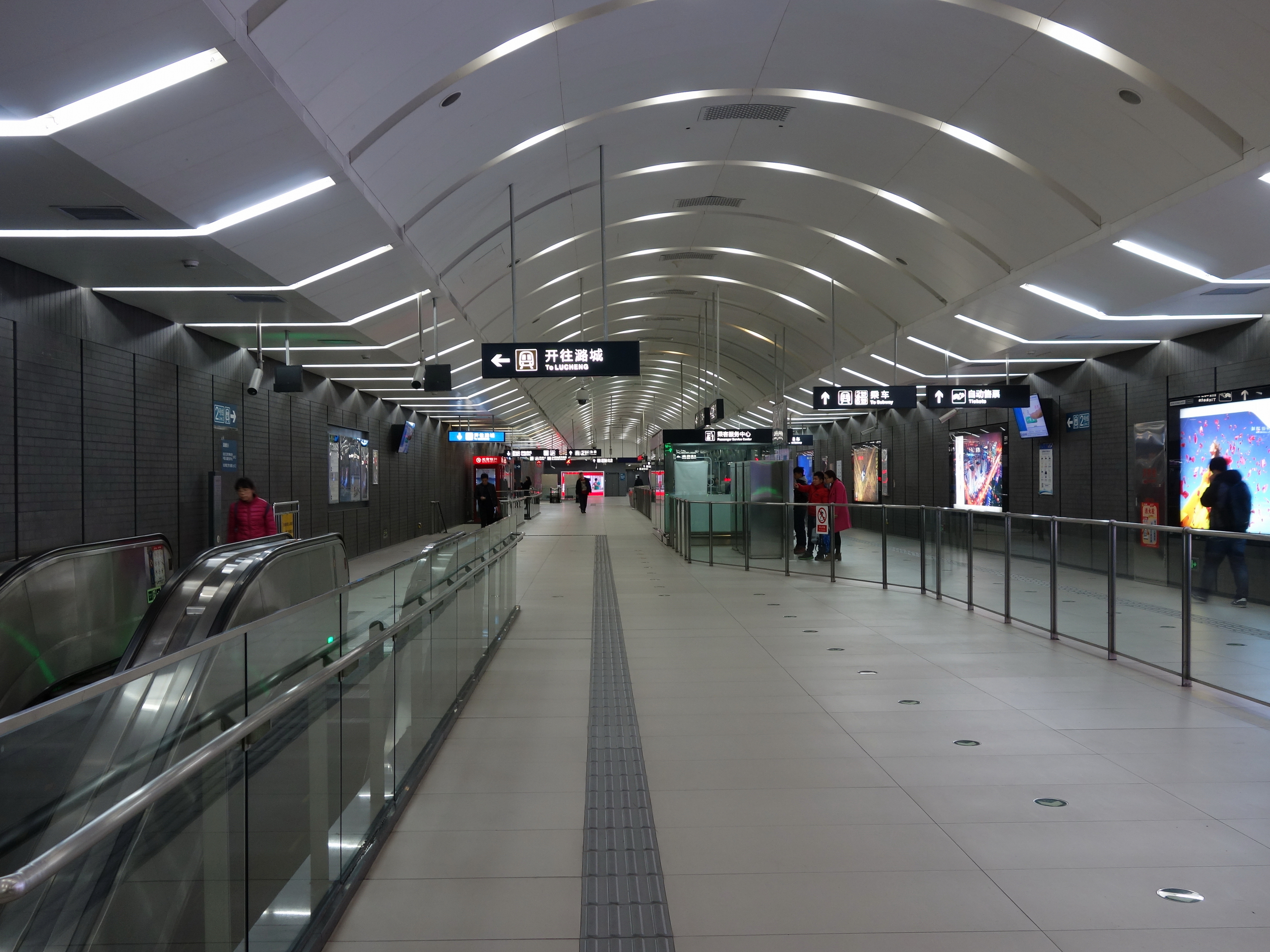
Line 6 concourse

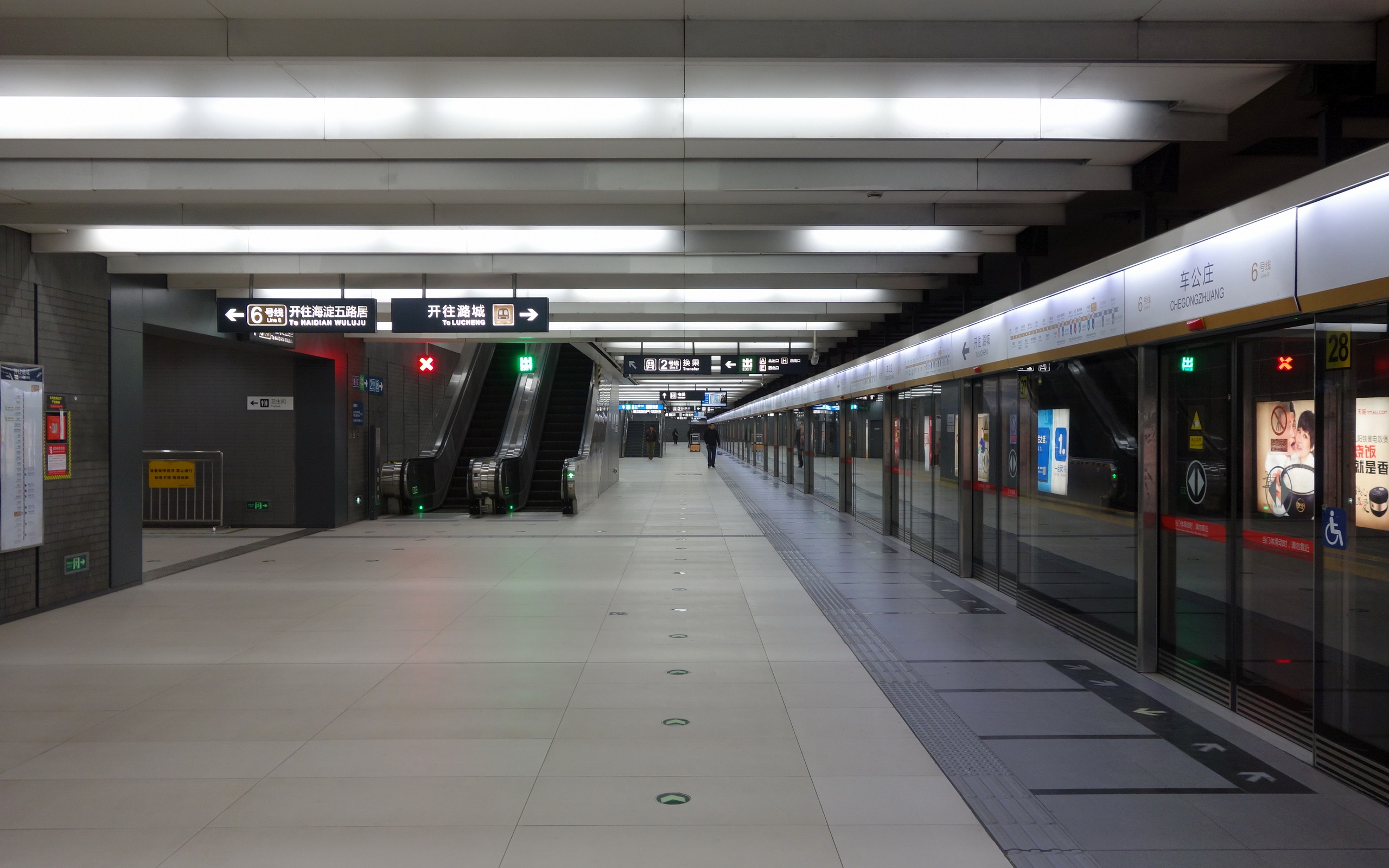
Line 6 platform

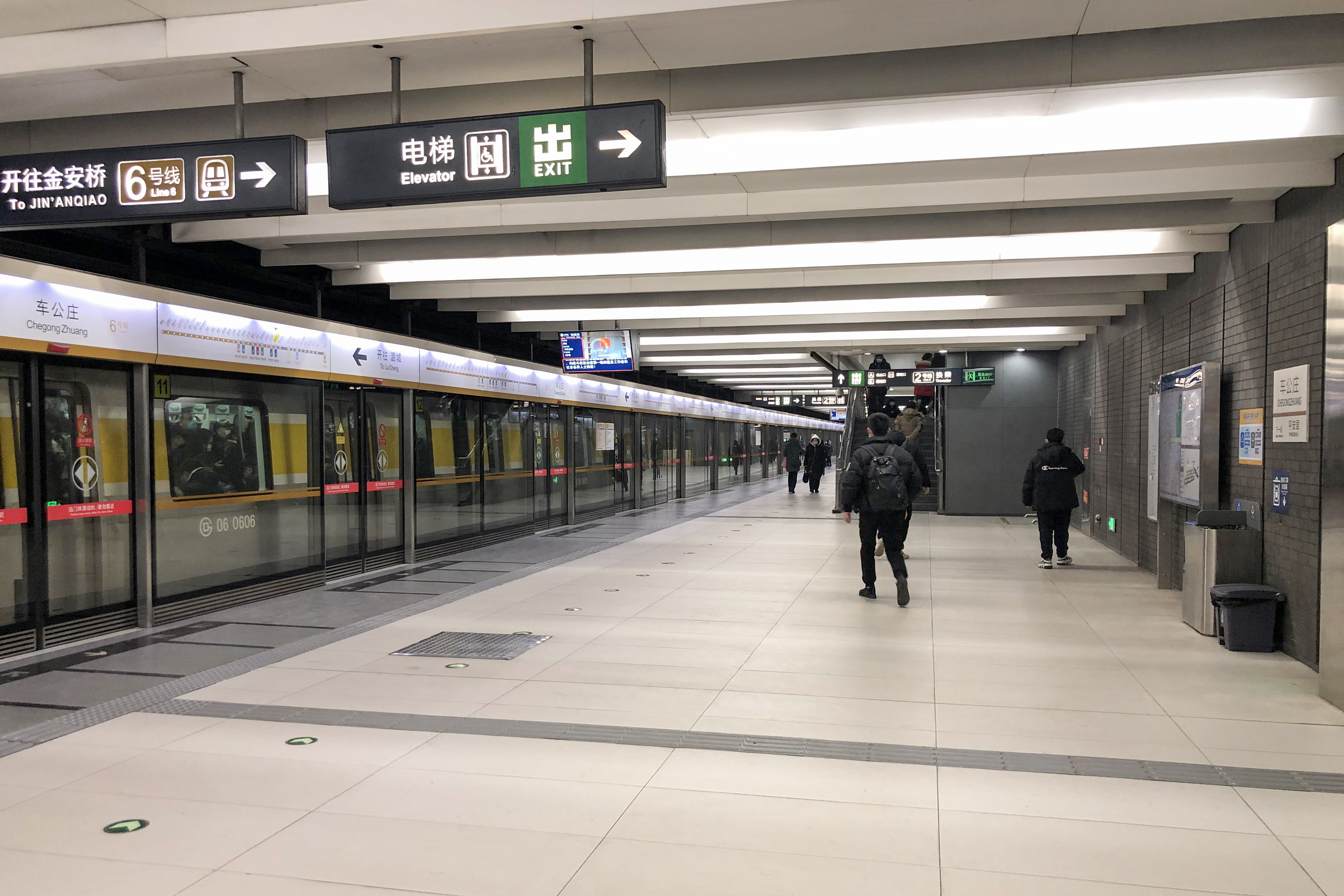
Eastbound line 6 platform

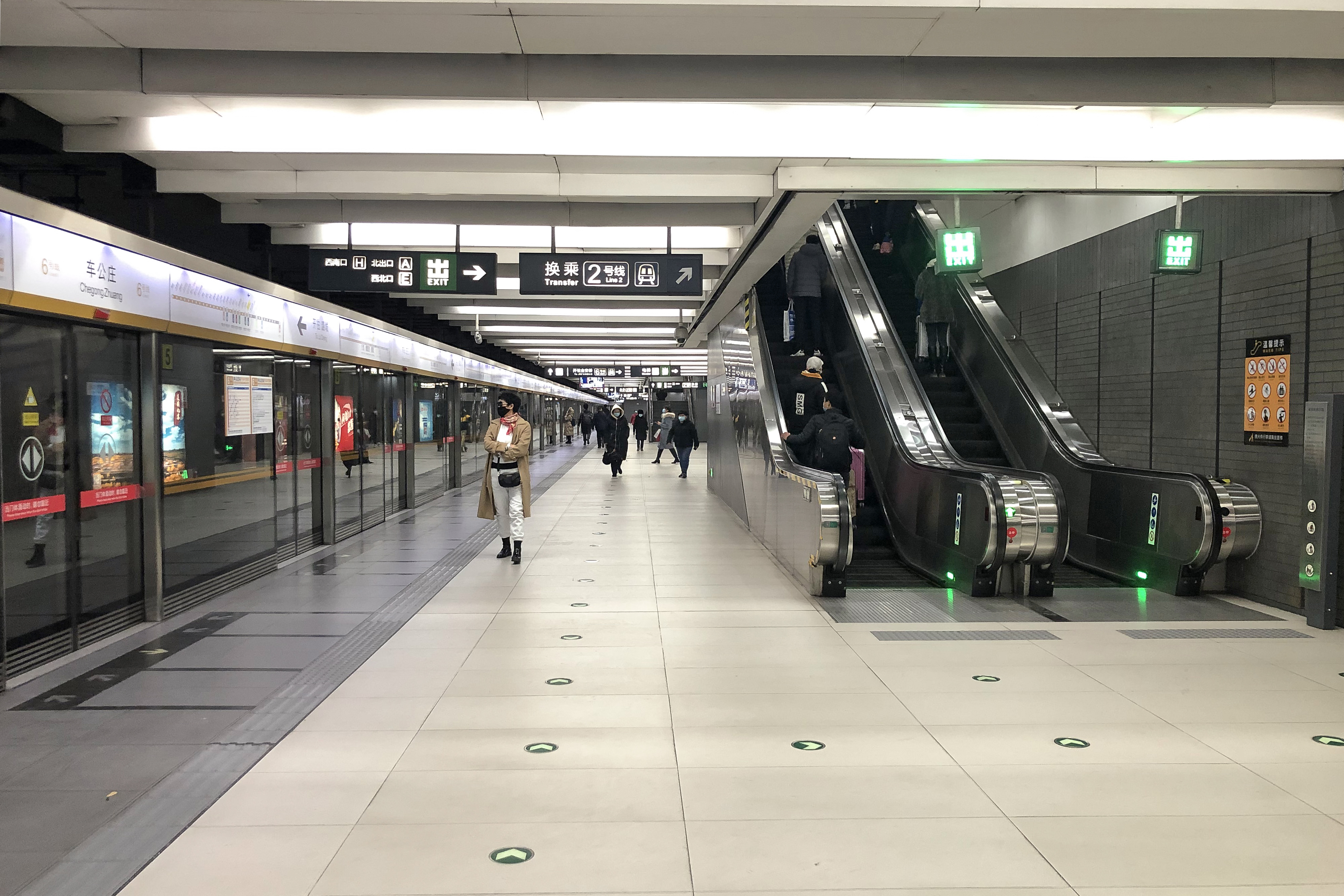
Eastbound line 6 platform with escalator to exits A, E, and H to the right

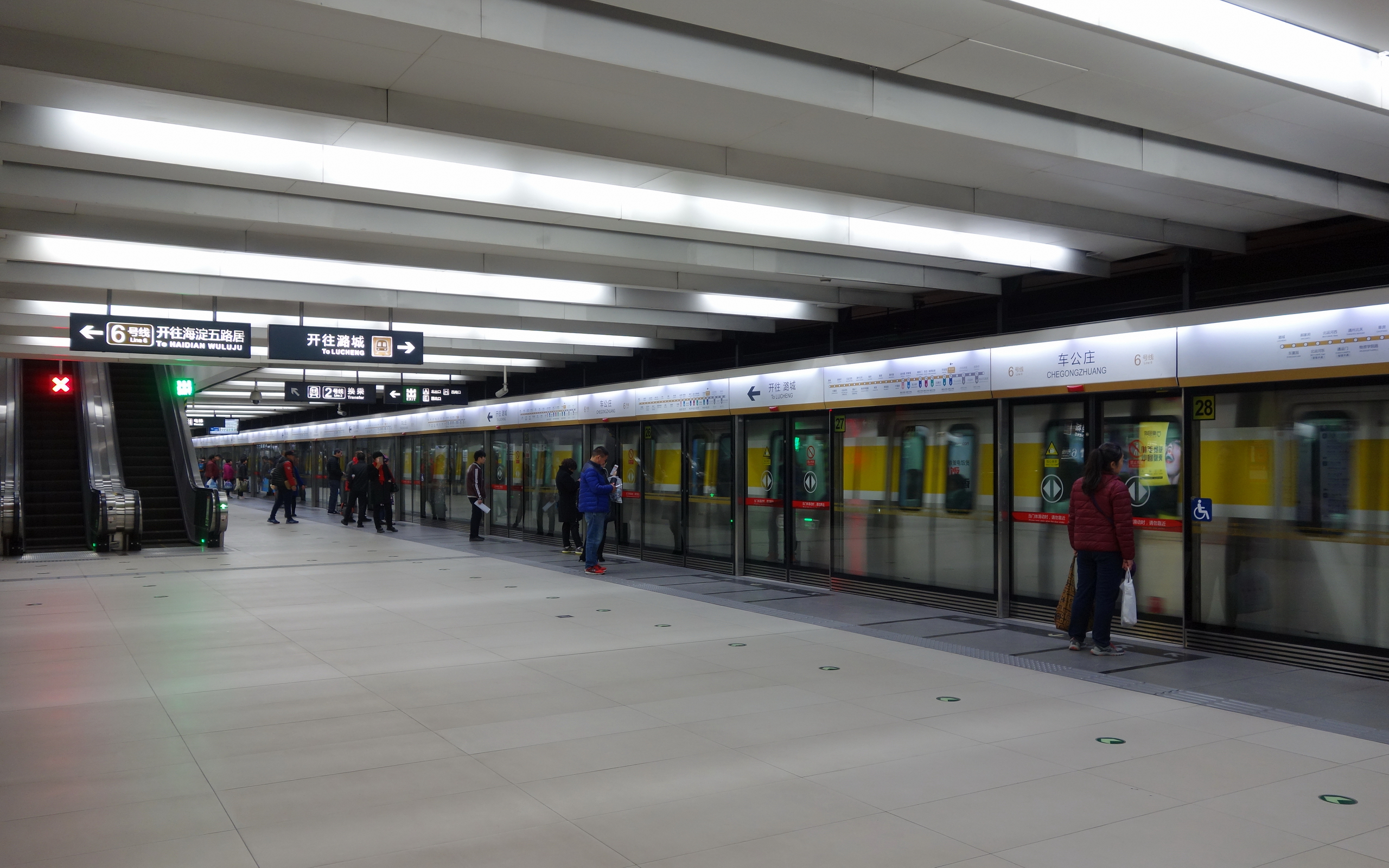
Eastbound line 6 platform in November 2016

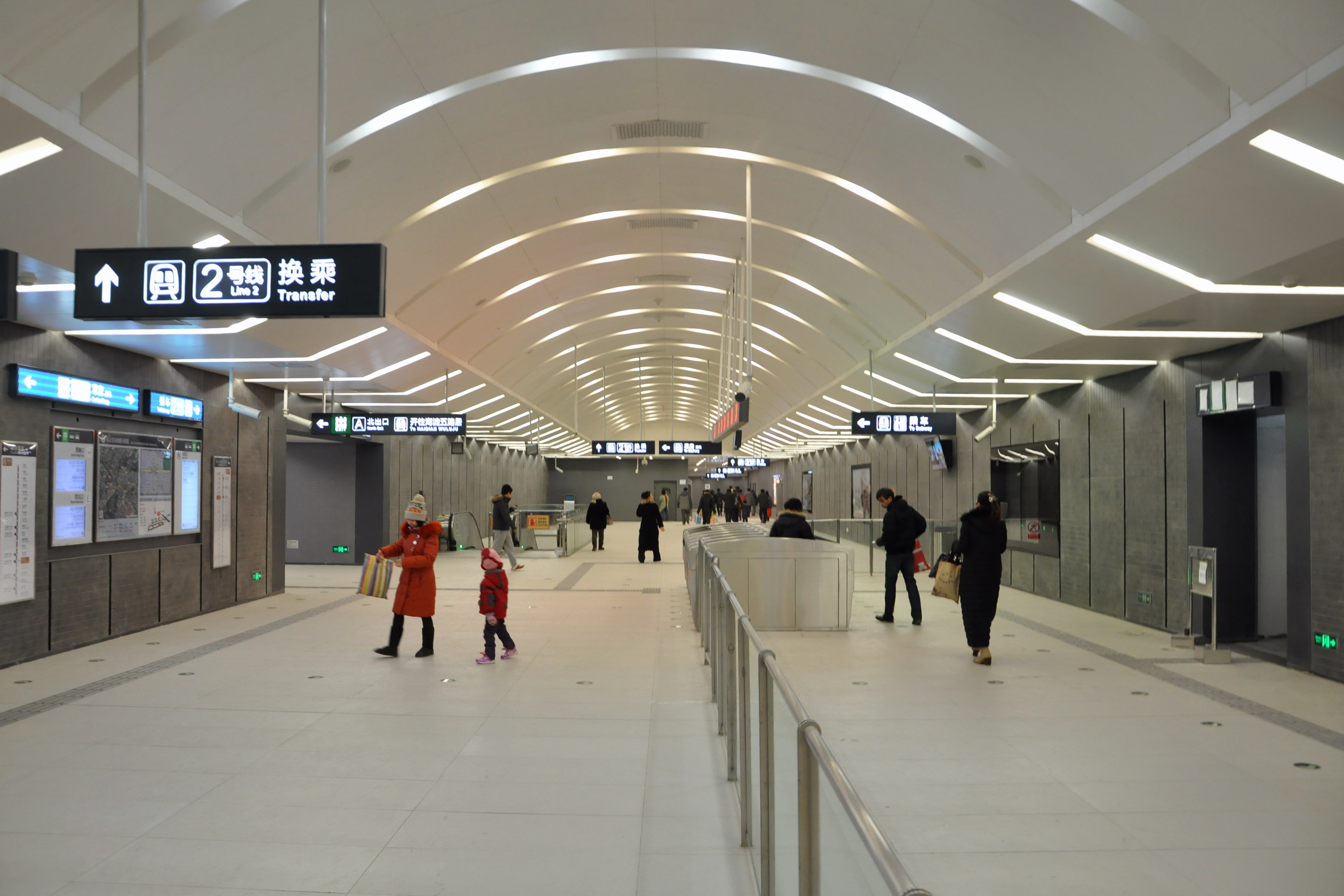
Line 6 concourse

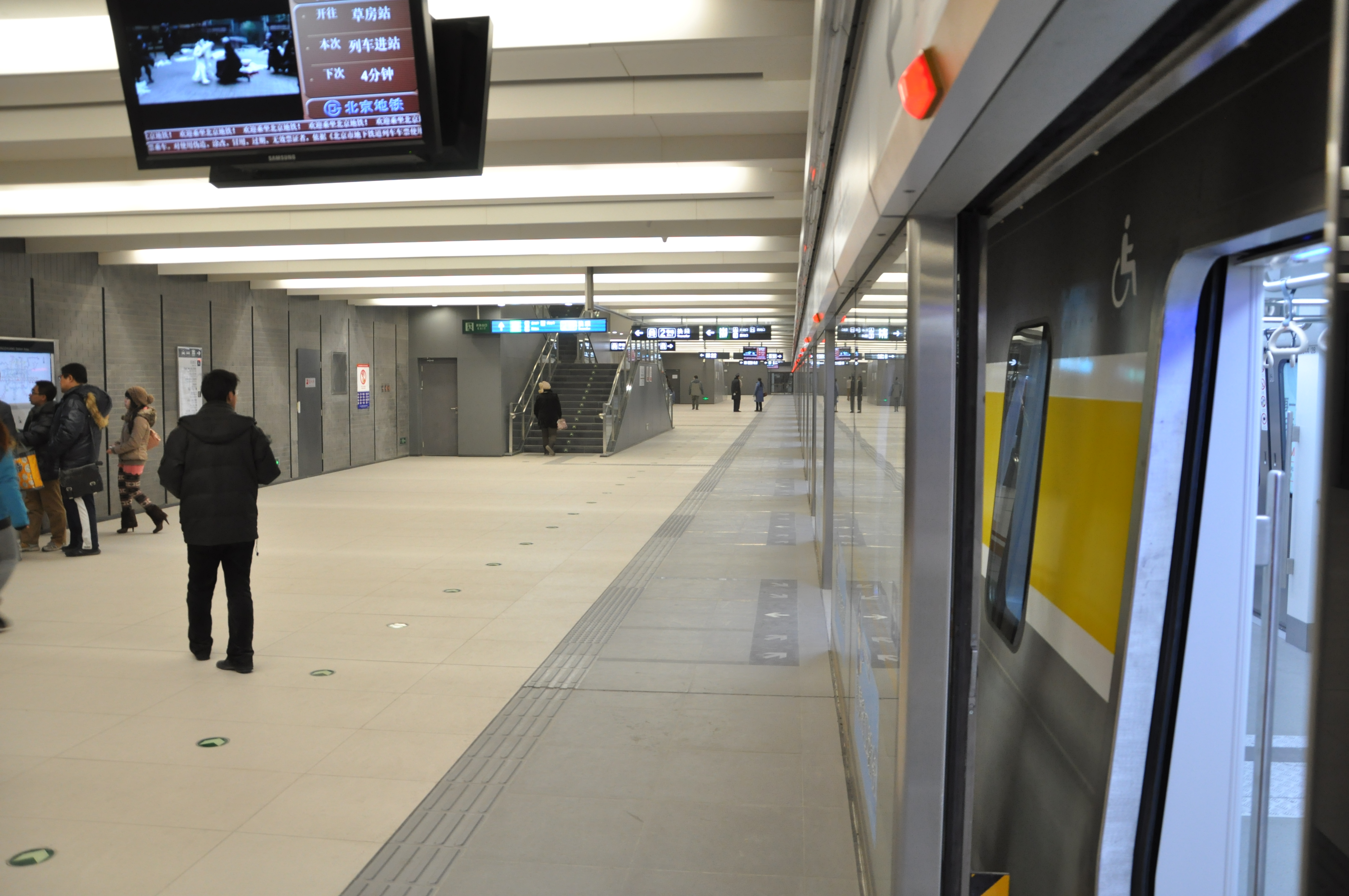
Line 6 train at Chegongzhuang station

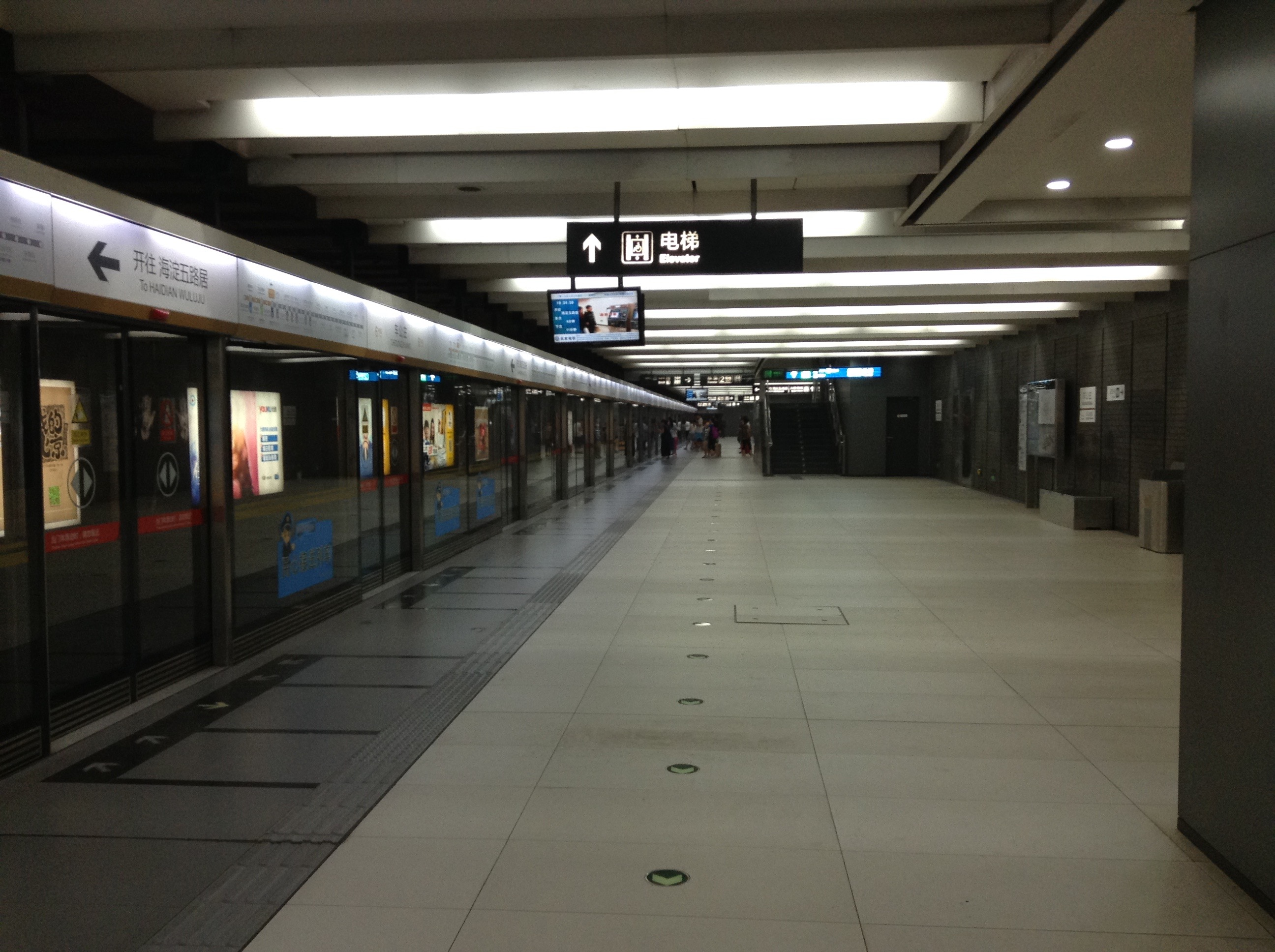
Westbound line 6 platform facing east

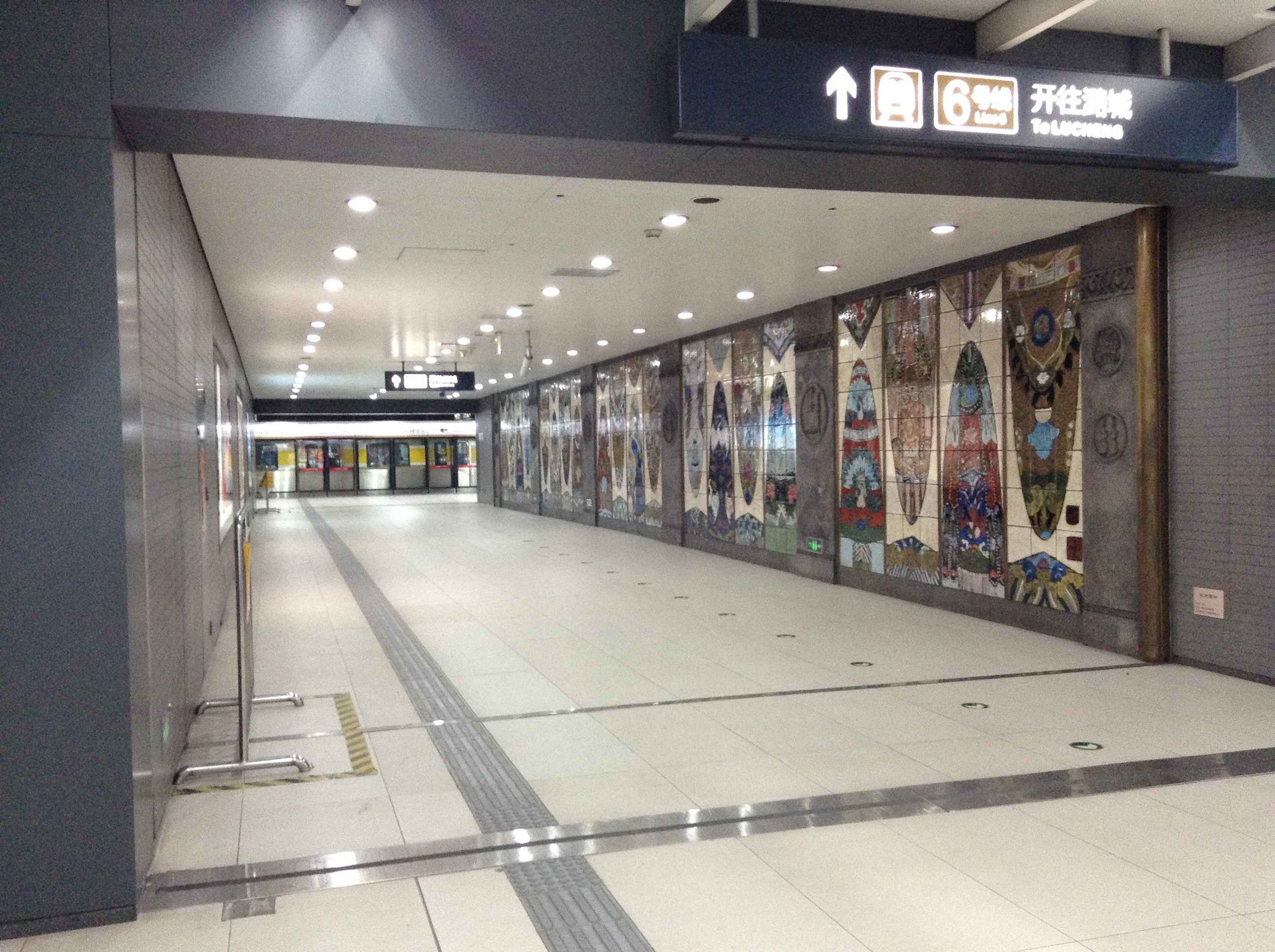
Corridor to the eastbound line 6 platform
