= Zhichun Li station =

Beijing Subway station

Zhichun Li 知春里
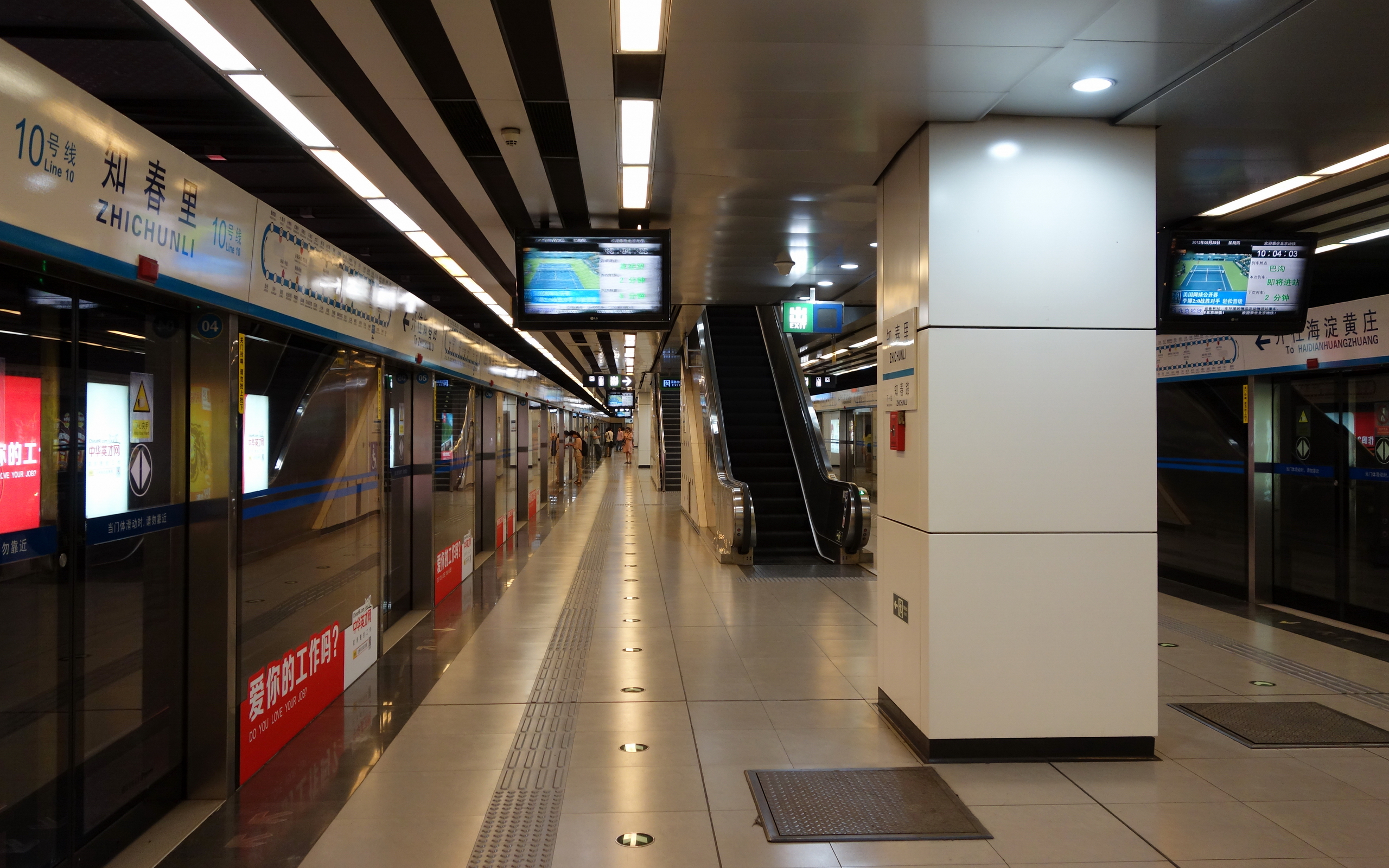
- Platform

General information
- Location: Zhichun Road; Zhongguancun Subdistrict, Haidian District, Beijing; China
- Coordinates: 39°58′30″N 116°19′22″E
- Operator: Beijing Mass Transit Railway Operation Corporation Limited
- Line: Line 10
- Platforms: 2 (1 island platform)
- Tracks: 2

Construction
- Structure type: Underground
- Accessible: Yes

History
- Opened: July 19, 2008; 18 years ago

Services
| Preceding station | Beijing Subway | Following station |
|---|---|---|
| Haidian Huangzhuang outer loop / anticlockwise | Line 10 | Zhichun Lu inner loop / clockwise |
Location
- Location within Beijing

Zhichun Li Station (Chinese: 知春里站; pinyin: Zhīchūnlǐ Zhàn) is a subway station on Line 10 of the Beijing Subway. It is located between Zhichun Lu (to the east) and Haidian Huangzhuang (to the west), under Zhichun Road. This is an underground station.

== Station layout ==
The station has an underground island platform.

== Exits ==
There are 3 exits, lettered A, B, and D. Exit B is accessible.

== Gallery ==
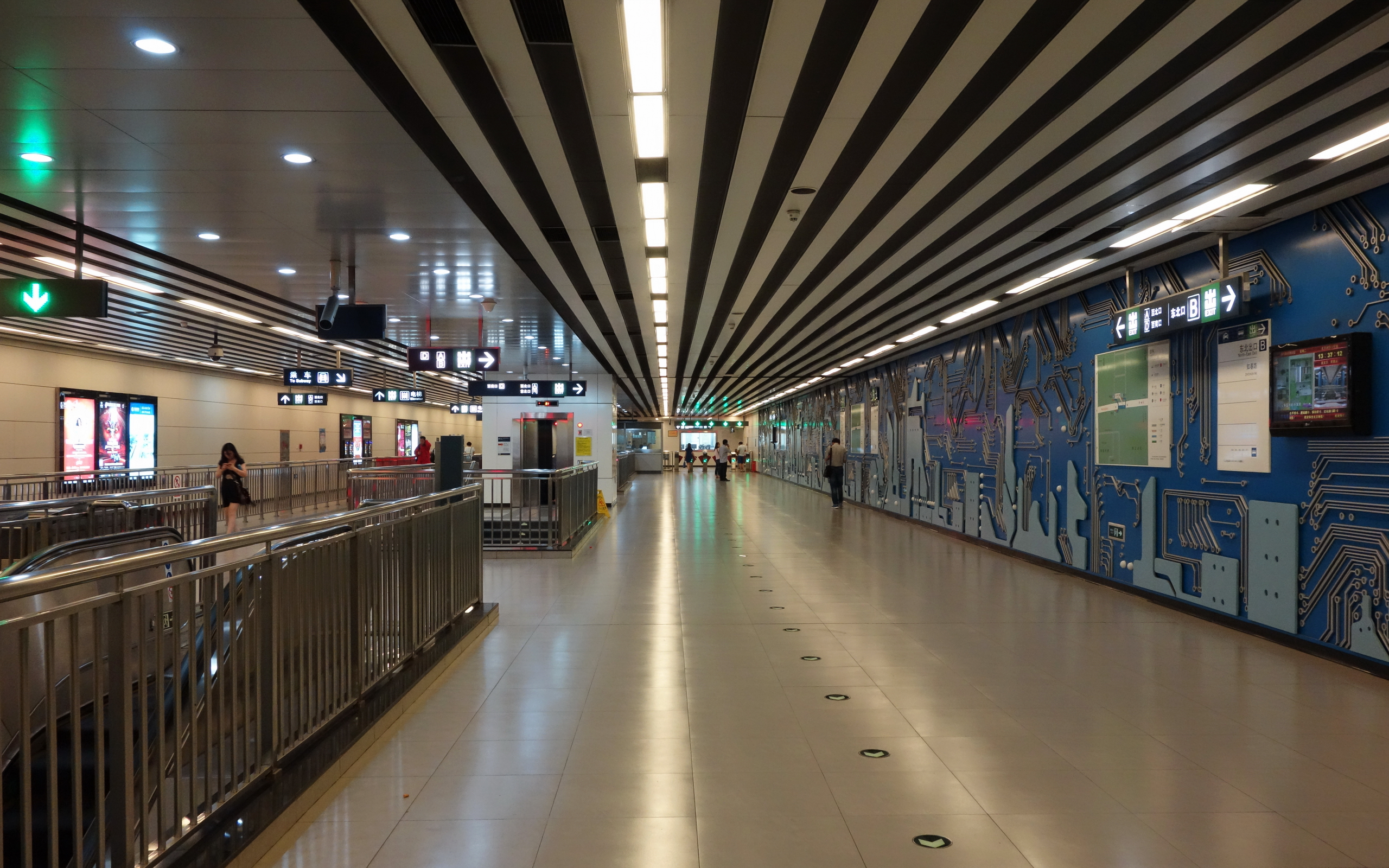
Station Hall
