= Haidian Huangzhuang station =

Beijing Subway interchange station

Haidian Huangzhuang 海淀黄庄
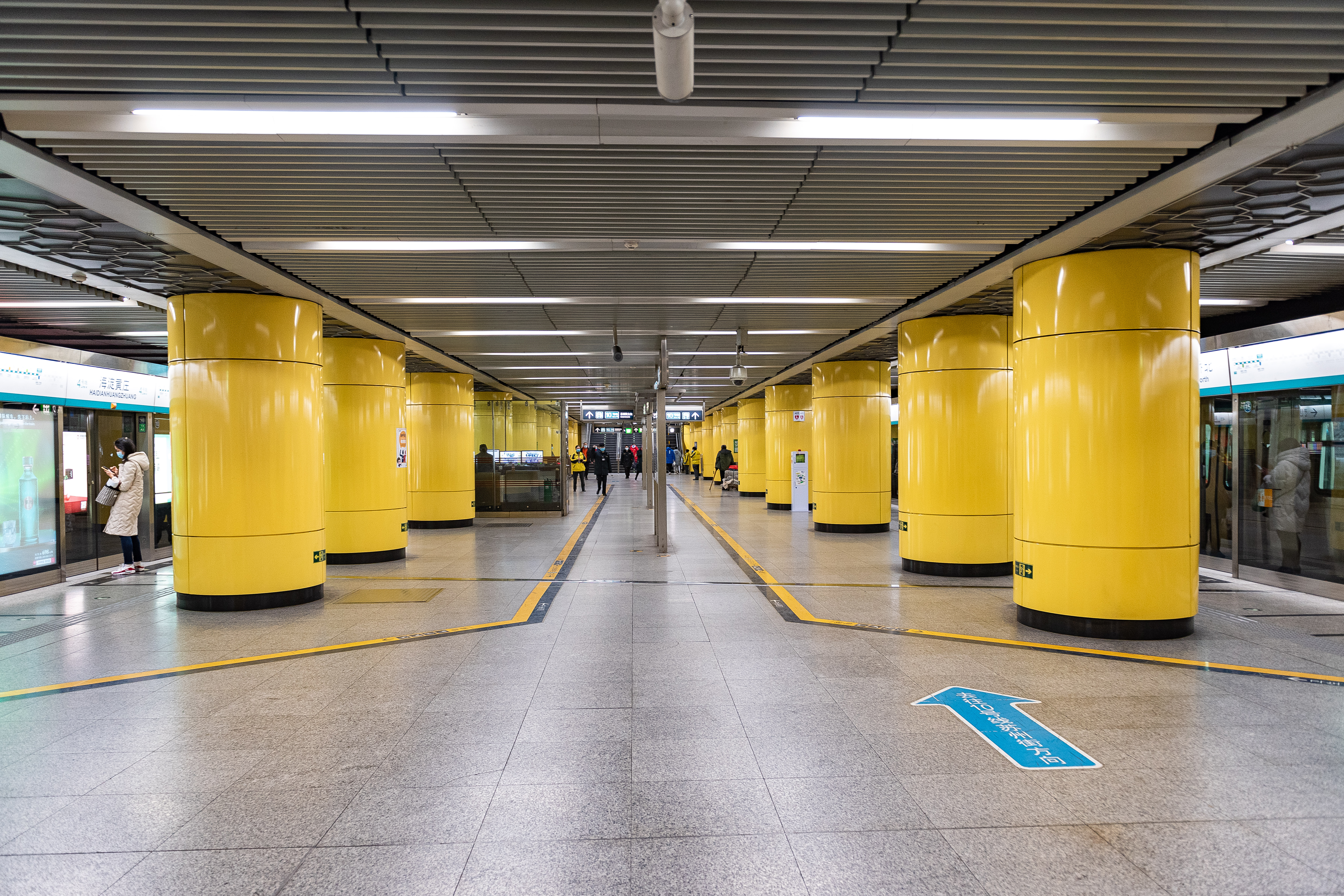
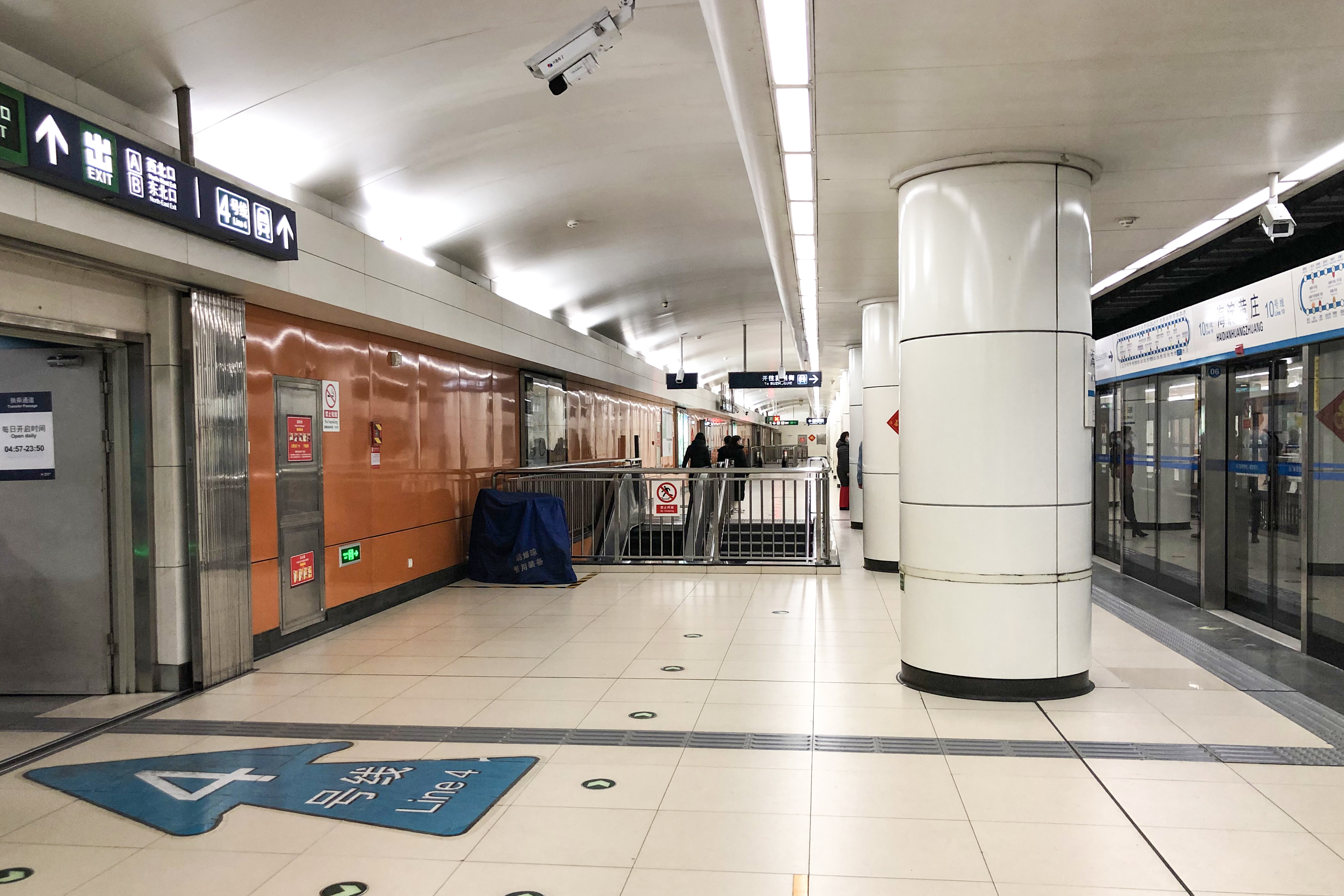
- Line 4 platform Line 10 counter-clockwise platform

General information
- Location: Zhongguancun Street and Haidian South Road; Haidian District, Beijing; China
- Coordinates: 39°58′34″N 116°19′03″E
- Operator: Beijing MTR Corporation Limited (Line 4); Beijing Mass Transit Railway Operation Corporation Limited (Line 10)
- Lines: Line 4; Line 10
- Platforms: 4 (1 island platform for Line 4 and 2 side platforms for Line 10)
- Tracks: 4

Construction
- Structure type: Underground
- Accessible: Yes

History
- Opened: September 28, 2009; 16 years ago (Line 4); July 19, 2008; 18 years ago (Line 10)

Services
| Preceding station | Beijing Subway | Following station |
|---|---|---|
| Zhongguancun towards Anheqiaobei | Line 4 | Renmin Univ. towards Tiangong Yuan |
| Suzhou Jie outer loop / anticlockwise | Line 10 | Zhichun Li inner loop / clockwise |
Location
- Location within Beijing

Haidian Huangzhuang Station (simplified Chinese: 海淀黄庄站; traditional Chinese: 海淀黃莊站; pinyin: Hǎidiàn Huángzhuāng zhàn) is a station on Line 4 and Line 10 of the Beijing Subway, located in Haidian District. This transfer station handled peak passenger traffic of 251,500 people on May 5, 2013.

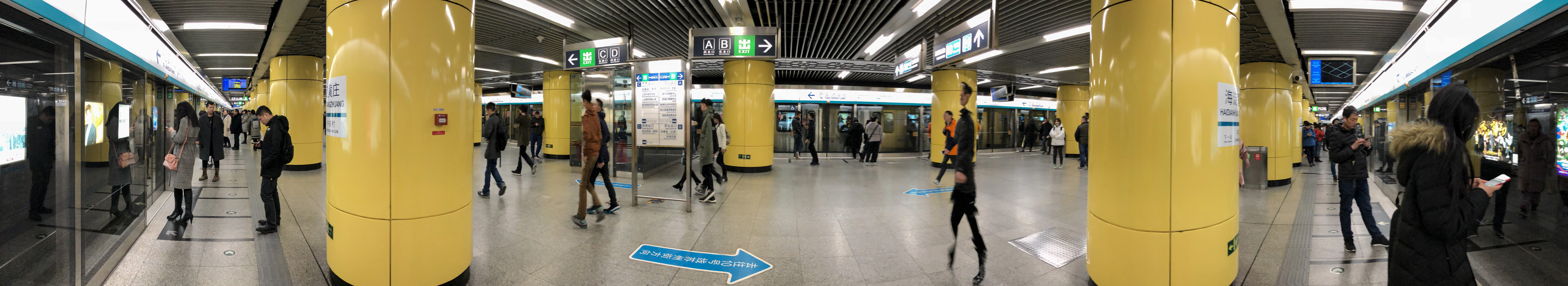
Platform panorama of L4 Haidian Huangzhuang Station
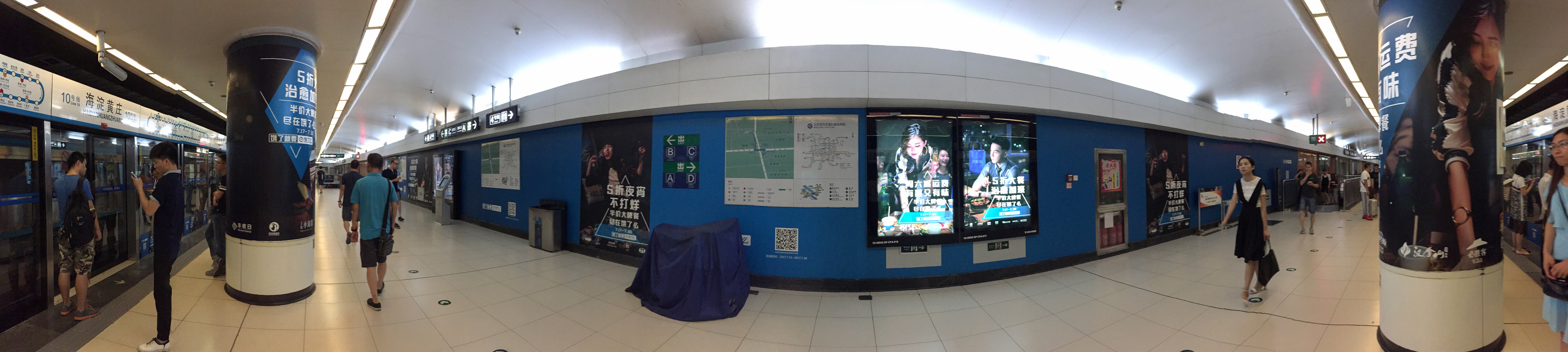
Clockwise platform panorama of L10 Haidian Huangzhuang Station

== Station layout ==
The line 4 station has an underground island platform. The line 10 station has 2 underground side platforms.

== Exits ==
There are 5 exits, lettered A1, A2, B, C, and D. Exits A1 and C are accessible.

== Gallery ==
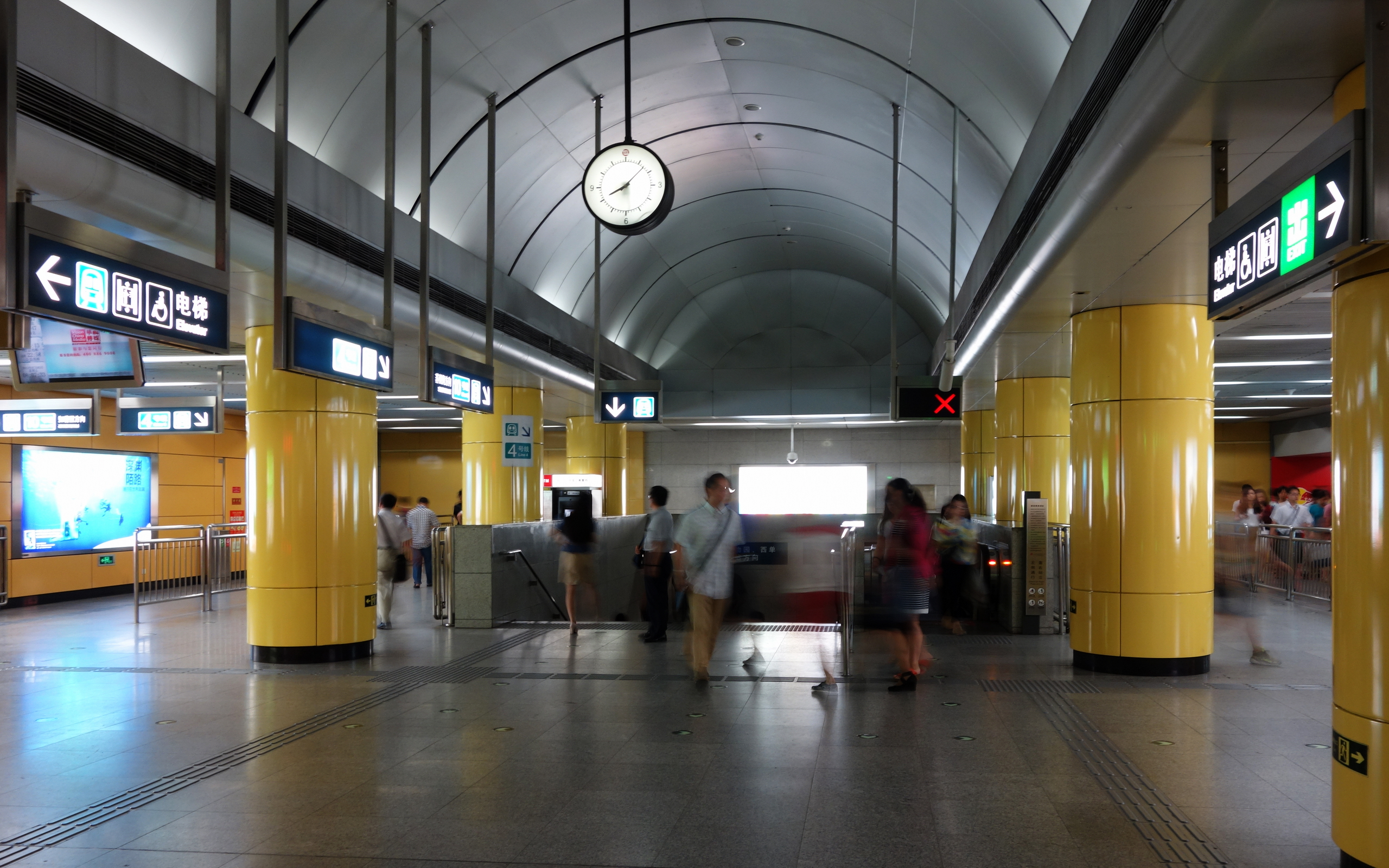
Station Hall of Line 4

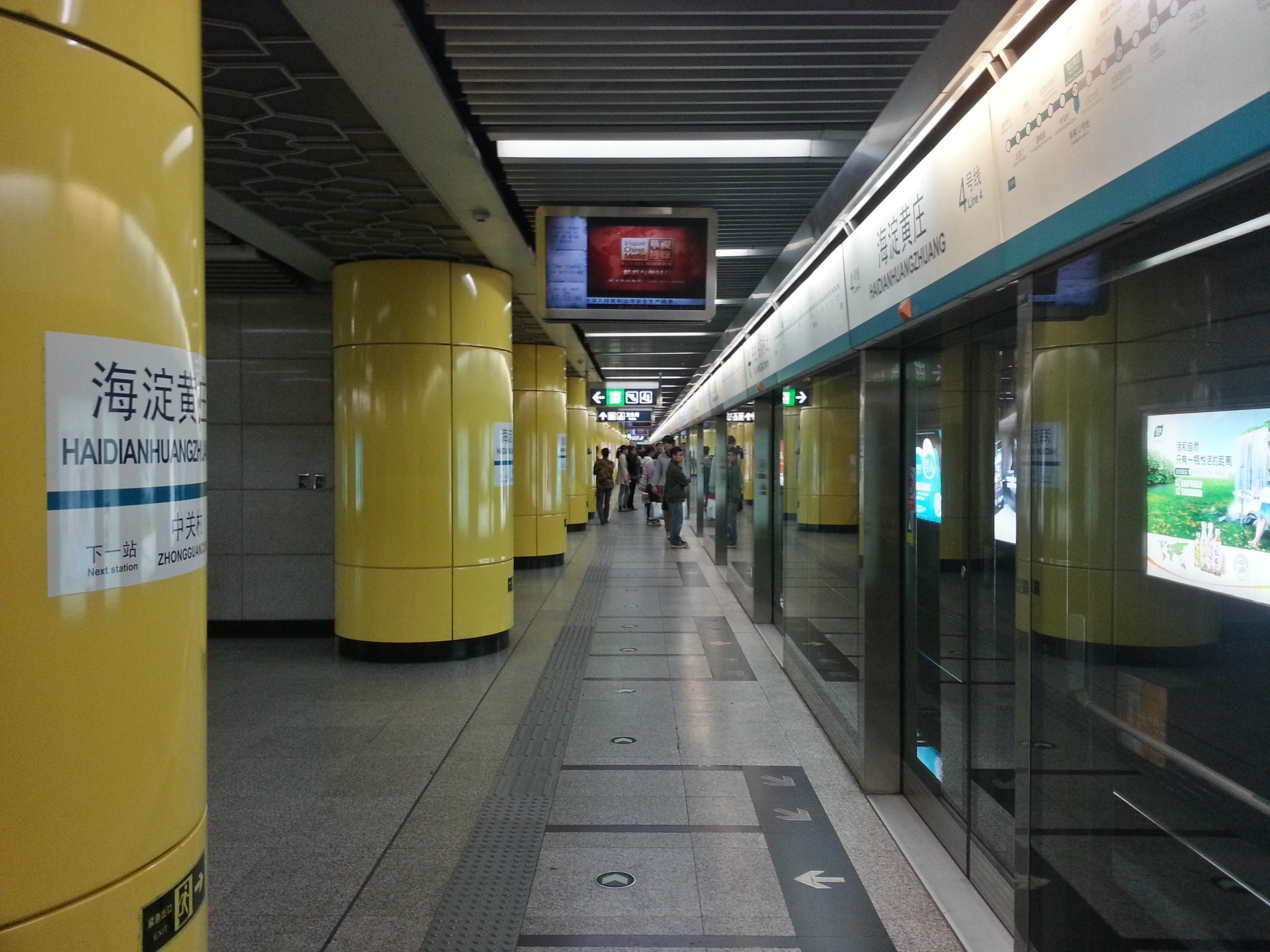
Platform of Line 4

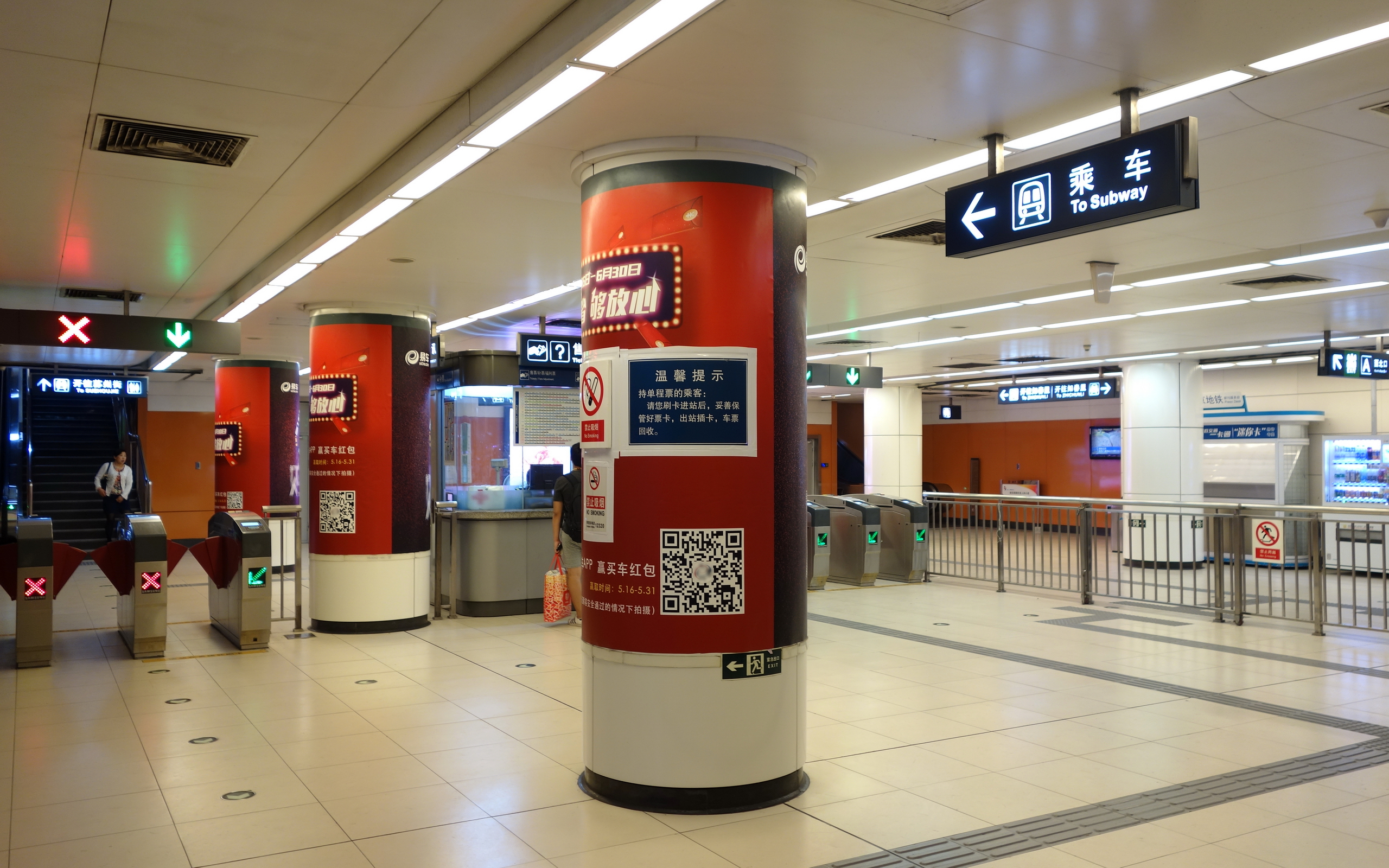
Station Hall of Line 10

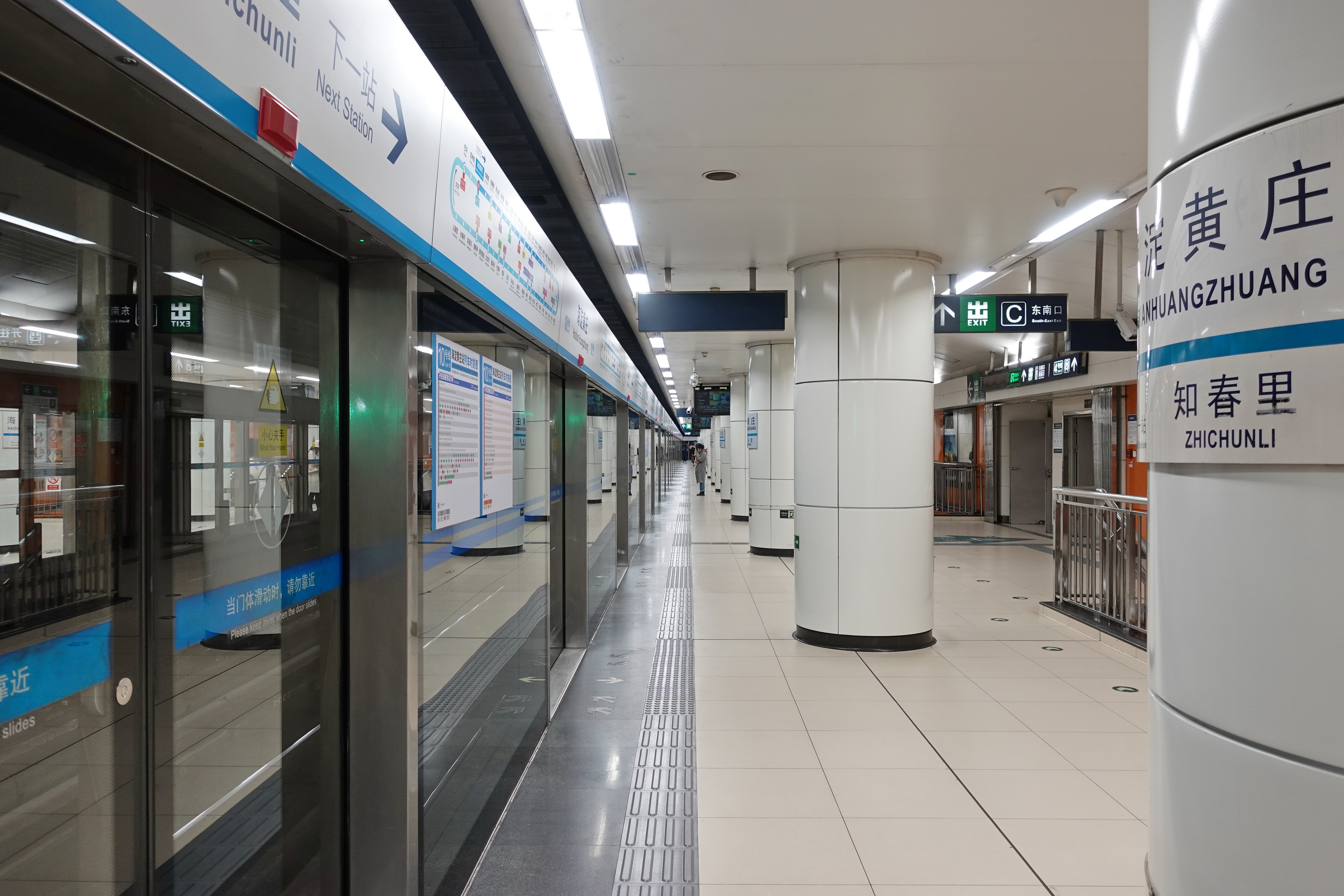
Clockwise platform of Line 10

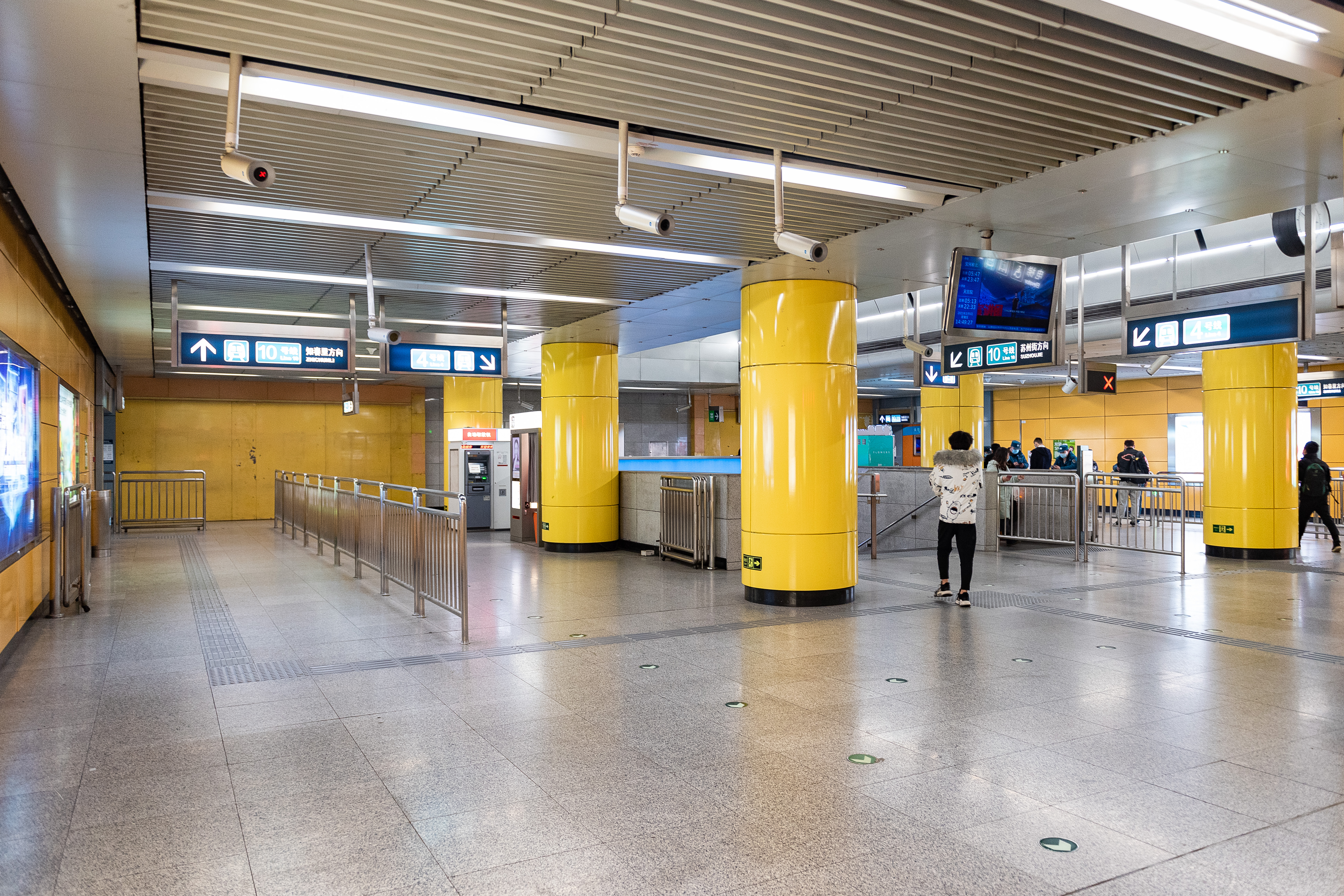
Line 4 south concourse

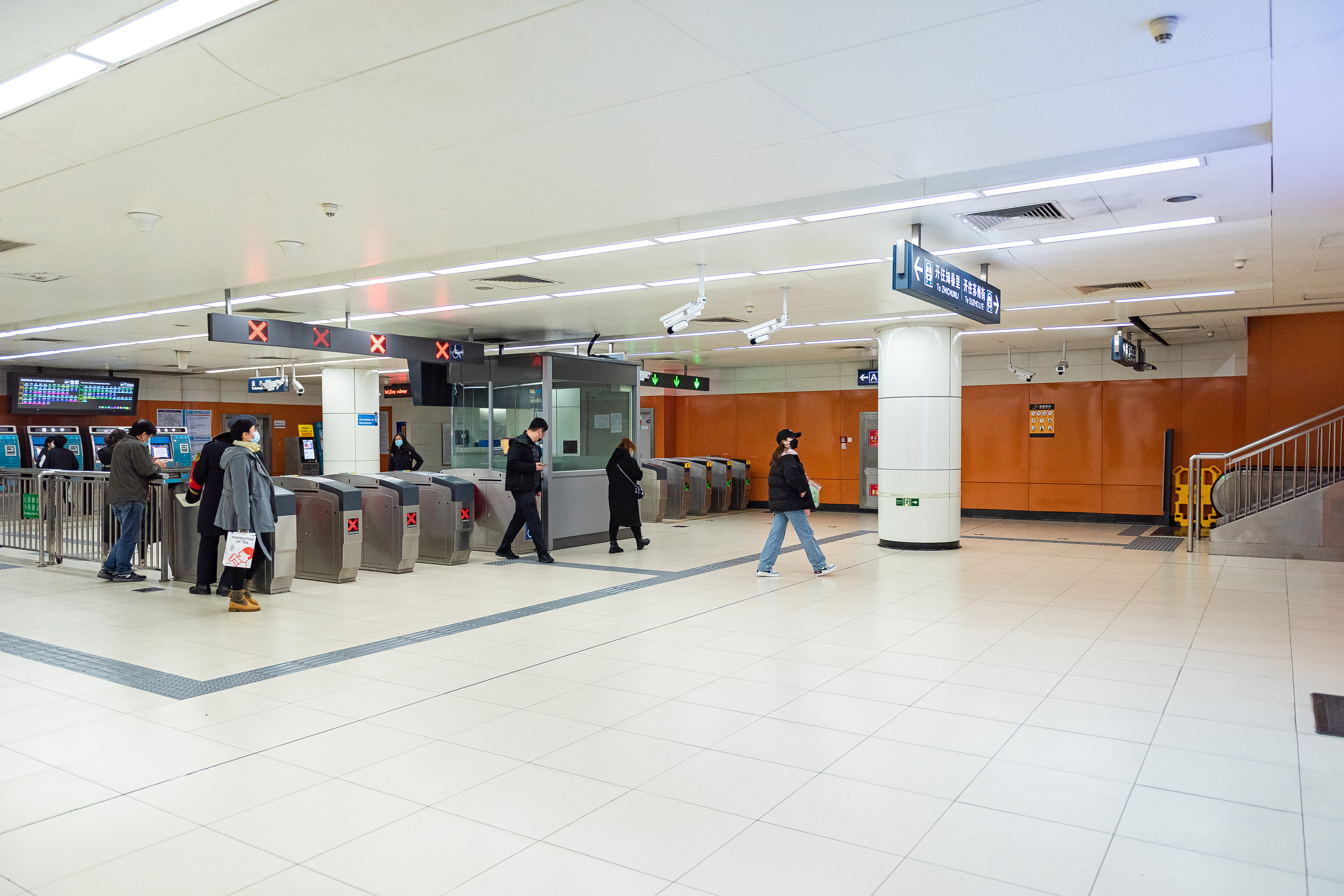
Line 10 west concourse

== Culture ==
The area around the station is known for its high concentration of prestigious primary and secondary schools, which has fueled a thriving private tutoring industry, earning the area the nickname Universe Tutoring Center (Chinese: 宇宙补课中心). As the saying goes in education industry, "To understand education in Beijing, look to Haidian; to understand education in Haidian, look to Huangzhuang."

== Around the station ==
- Haidian Mosque
- Haidian Centre
