= Haidian Mosque =

Mosque in Haidian, Beijing, China

- 海淀清真寺
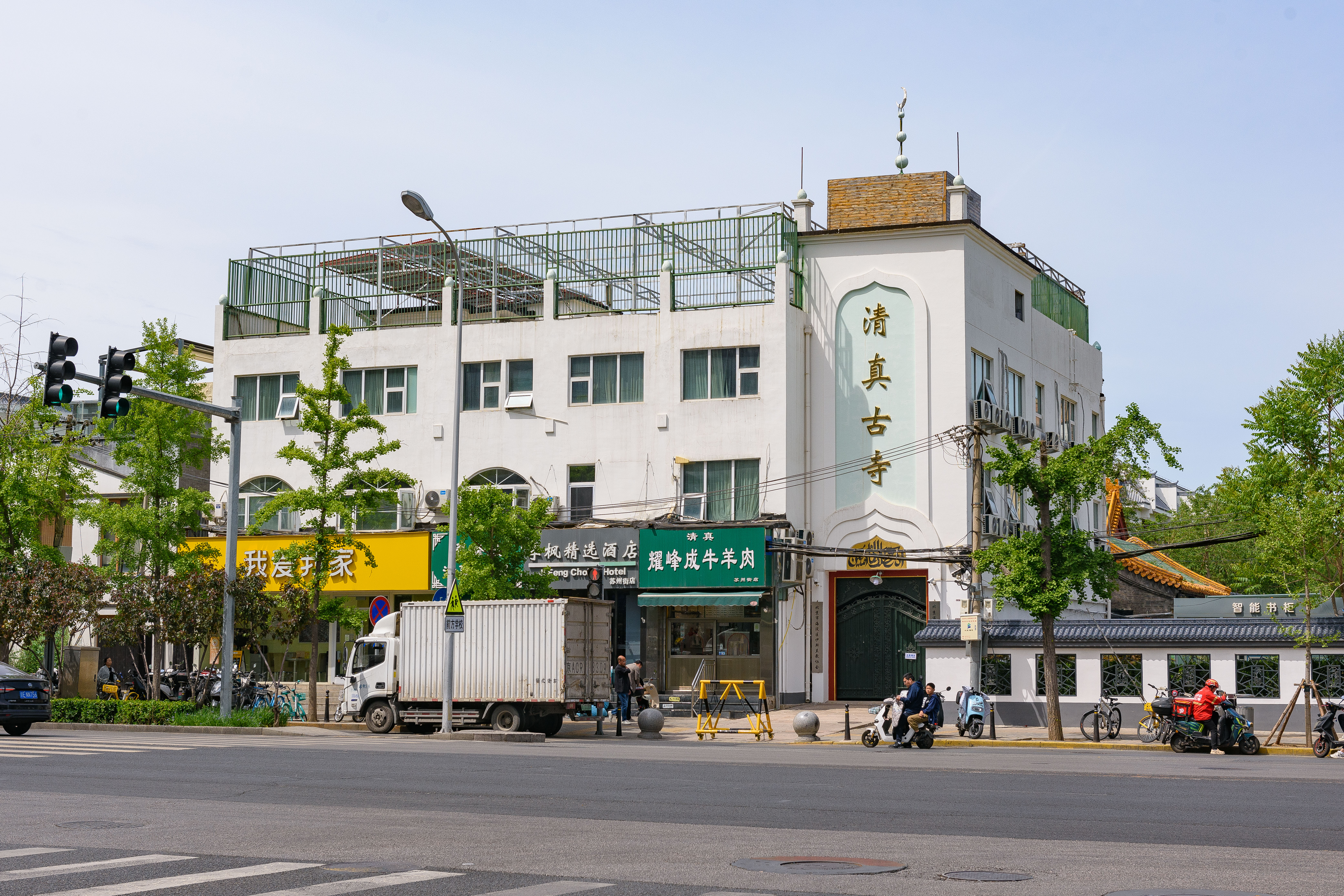

- Location of the mosque in Beijing

Religion
- Affiliation: Sunni Islam
- Ecclesiastical or organizational status: Mosque
- Status: Active

Location
- Location: Haidian, Beijing
- Country: China
- Interactive map of Haidian Mosque
- Coordinates: 39.97757°N 116.29974°E

Architecture
- Type: Mosque
- Style: Chinese
- Completed: c. 17th century
- Capacity: 200 worshipers

The Haidian Mosque (Chinese: 海淀清真寺; pinyin: Hǎidiàn Qīngzhēnsì) is a mosque in Haidian District, Beijing, China.

== History ==
The mosque was originally constructed during the late Ming dynasty. During the reign of the Jiaqing Emperor of the Qing dynasty, the mosque was renovated and expanded to its current state.

== Architecture ==
The mosque has a capacity of 200 worshipers.

== Transportation ==
The mosque is accessible within walking distance west of Haidian Huangzhuang Station of Beijing Subway.

== See also ==
- Islam in China
- List of mosques in China
